= List of listed buildings in Lismore and Appin =

List of listed buildings in Lismore and Appin may refer to:

- List of listed buildings in Lismore and Appin, Argyll and Bute
- List of listed buildings in Lismore and Appin, Highland
