= Occamism =

Philosophical and theological system of William of Ockham

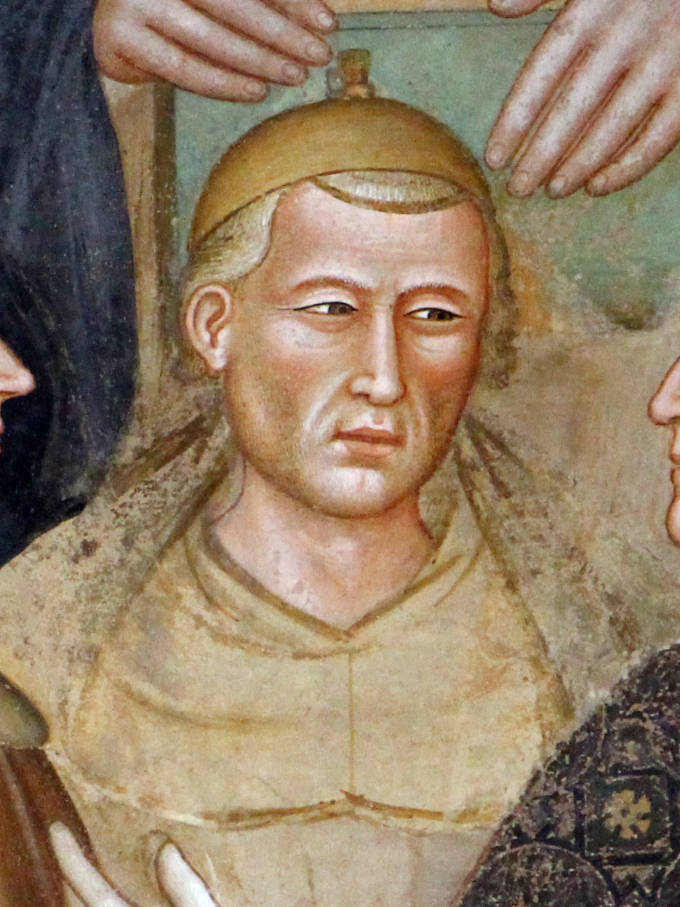
William of Ockham, after whom Occamism is named

Occamism (or Ockhamism) is the philosophical and theological teaching developed by William of Ockham (1285–1347) and his disciples, which had widespread currency in the 14th century.

Occamism differed from the other Scholastic schools on two major points: (1) that only individuals exist, rather than supra-individual metaphysical universals, essences, or forms (universals are the mind's abstract products and have no independent existence), and (2) the reduction of ontology.

== Content and method ==
Occamism questions the physical and Aristotelian metaphysics and, in particular, insists the only reality accessible to knowledge is intuitive. The universals, which exist only in the mind, have no correspondence with reality and are mere signs that symbolize a multiplicity of individuals. The further one goes from experience and generalizes, the more one imagines the constitution of the universal expressed by names. It is therefore necessary to revise the logical structures of discourse and language to separate the sign from the signified thing. Criticism of the concept of cause and substance, especially by the Occamistic Nicholas of Autrecourt, reduces the sciences to immediate and intuitive ways of knowing.

The Occamists using the nominalist method separate theology from Aristotelian foundations, making them lose any possibility of presenting themselves as science, and reducing confidence in the power of reason applied to supposed demonstrations of God's existence and any immortality of the soul. Despite this, they posited God's absolute power to explain the contingency of creatures and the laws of nature. Divine omnipotence also includes the idea that God can comprehend a nonexistent object: an anticipation of the "deceptive God", a theme Descartes used in asserting the certainty of the cogito ergo sum.

Occamism had wide influence between the 14th and 17th centuries, contributing to the progressive dissolution of Scholastic Aristotelianism.

== See also ==
- Augustinianism
- Cartesianism
- Conceptualism
- Peter Abelard
- Scotism
- Thomism
- Occam's razor

== Notes ==
^α De contemptu mundi (book 1, v. 952) satirical work by Bernard of Cluny, a Benedictine monk of the 12th century who attacked the corruption of the laity and the Church of his time and who mentioned the nominalistic polemic of the 12th century against the reality of universals: a debate that, according to philosophical historiography, Occamism will take up in the 14th century. According to other authors, Occamism does not resume the nominalistic theses but expresses about universals the doctrine of conceptualism.
