= George Henderson (bishop) =

Scottish Anglican bishop

The Right Reverend George Henderson M.B.E.,
- Bishop of Argyll and The Isles; Primus of the Scottish Episcopal Church
- Church: Scottish Episcopal Church
- Diocese: Argyll and The Isles
- Elected: 1977
- In office: 1977–1992
- Predecessor: Richard Wimbush
- Successor: Douglas Cameron
- Other post: Primus of the Scottish Episcopal Church (1990–1992)

Orders
- Ordination: 1945 by John How
- Consecration: 30 November 1977 by Alastair Haggart

Personal details
- Born: 5 December 1922 Oban, Argyll and Bute, Scotland
- Died: 22 September 1997 (aged 74) Onich, Highland, Scotland
- Denomination: Anglican
- Parents: George Buchanan Henderson & Anna Kennedy Butters
- Spouse: Isobel Bowman
- Education: University of Edinburgh

George Kennedy Buchanan Henderson MBE (5 December 1922 – 26 September 1997) was a Scottish Anglican bishop in the 20th century. He was Bishop of Argyll and The Isles and elected Primus of the Scottish Episcopal Church.

Henderson was educated at the University of Edinburgh and ordained in 1945. He began his ordained ministry with a curacy at Christ Church, Glasgow, after which he was the priest in charge of St Bride's, Nether Lochaber and then the rector of St Andrew's Fort William. In 1973, he became Dean of the Diocese of Argyll and The Isles and was appointed a Member of the Order of the British Empire (MBE) in 1974. In 1977 he became Bishop of Argyll and The Isles (diocesan bishop of the same diocese). He was elected Primus of the Scottish Episcopal Church in 1990 and retired in 1992.

Scottish Episcopal Church titles
Preceded by George James Cosmo Douglas	Dean of Argyll and The Isles; 1972–1977	Succeeded by Charles MacAlester Copland
Preceded by Richard Wimbush	Bishop of Argyll and The Isles; 1977–1992	Succeeded by Douglas Cameron
Preceded by Ted Luscombe	Primus of the Scottish Episcopal Church; 1990–1992	Succeeded by Richard Holloway
