= Kenneth Mackenzie (bishop of Argyll and The Isles) =

Scottish Anglican bishop (1863–1945)

The Right Reverend Kenneth Mackenzie
- Bishop of Argyll and The Isles
- Church: Scottish Episcopal Church
- Diocese: Argyll and The Isles
- In office: 1907–1942
- Predecessor: Alexander Chinnery-Haldane
- Successor: Thomas Hannay

Orders
- Ordination: 1891
- Consecration: 1907

Personal details
- Born: 10 June 1863 Edinburgh, Scotland
- Died: 20 April 1945 (aged 81) Oban, Argyll and Bute, Scotland
- Buried: St John's Cathedral, Oban
- Denomination: Anglican
- Parents: Donald Mackenzie & Janet Alice Mitchell
- Spouse: Alice White
- Children: 6

Kenneth Mackenzie (10 June 1863 – 20 April 1945) was an Anglican bishop in the mid 20th century. Born in Edinburgh, Scotland, the son of Lord Mackenzie, he was educated at Loretto School and Keble College, Oxford and ordained after a period of study at Ripon College Cuddesdon in 1891.

His ecclesiastical career began as a curate at St Mary Redcliffe, Bristol, England, after which he began a 12-year stint at St Paul's Cathedral, Dundee: being successively curate, rector and its first provost when it achieved cathedral status in 1905.

In 1907, he was elevated to the episcopate as Bishop of Argyll and The Isles, a post he held until 1942.

In 1897, he married Alice White (1865–1944), daughter of James Farquhar White of Balruddery, Perthshire. They had two sons and four daughters, including Kenneth Nigel Mackenzie who later went on to become the minister of Oban Cathedral (1901–1964).

He was created a Companion of the Roll of Honour of the Memorial of Merit of King Charles the Martyr in 1930.

Religious titles
| Preceded by Inaugural appointment | Provost of St Paul's Cathedral, Dundee; 1905–1907 | Succeeded by Frederick Charles Moir |
| Preceded by James Robert Alexander Chinnery-Haldane | Bishop of Argyll and The Isles; 1907 – 1942 | Succeeded by Thomas Hannay |
