= Alexander Ewing =

Alexander Ewing may refer to:

- Alexander Ewing (bishop) (1814–1873), Scottish church leader
- Alexander Ewing (composer) (1830–1895), Scottish musician, composer and translator
- Alexander Ewing (soldier) (1768–1827), soldier for the Continental Army during the American Revolutionary War and the War of 1812

== See also ==
- Alexander Ewing House, a historic mansion in Nashville, Tennessee, U.S.A. originally built for Alexander Ewing (1752–1822), American Revolutionary War Captain for the Continental Army
