= Ian Wilson (priest) =

Scottish Anglican priest

Ian George MacQueen Wilson was an Anglican Priest.

Born on 6 March 1920, he was educated at Edinburgh Theological College and ordained in 1951. Initially he was Curate of St Margaret's, Glasgow and then Priest in charge of St Gabriel's, in the same city. He held incumbencies at Christ Church, Dalbeattie, St John's, Baillieston and St Paul's, Rothesay. He was Synod Clerk for the Diocese of Argyll and The Isles from 1977 to 1979 and then its Dean until 1987. He died on 18 November 1988.

== Notes ==
Religious titles
| Preceded by Charles MacAlester Copland | Dean of Argyll and The Isles; 1979 – 1987 | Succeeded by John Henry James MacLeay |
