= James Paterson (priest) =

James Paterson was Dean of Argyll and The Isles from 1846 until 1848.

== Notes ==
Religious titles
Preceded by Inaugural appointment	Dean of Argyll and The Isles; 1846 – 1848	Succeeded by Samuel Hood
