= Martin Shaw (bishop) =

Scottish bishop

The Right Reverend Martin Shaw
- Bishop Emeritus of Argyll and The Isles
- Church: Scottish Episcopal Church
- Diocese: Diocese of Argyll and The Isles
- In office: 2004–2009

Orders
- Ordination: 1968 (deacon); 1969 (priest)
- Consecration: 8 June 2004

Personal details
- Born: Alexander Martin Shaw; 22 September 1944 (age 82)
- Denomination: Anglicanism
- Spouse: Elspeth
- Children: 2
- Education: King's College, London; University of Glasgow

Alexander Martin Shaw (born 22 September 1944) is a retired Anglican bishop who served in the Scottish Episcopal Church. He was the Bishop of Argyll and The Isles from 2004 to 2009.

== Early life and education ==
Shaw studied theology at King's College London and was awarded the Associateship of King's College (AKC) in 1967. He trained for ordination at Warminster Theological College from 1967 to 1968. He studied at the University of Glasgow, from which he was awarded a Certificate in Social Psychology in 1970.

== Ordained ministry ==
Shaw was ordained to the Anglican ministry as a deacon in 1968 and a priest in 1969. His first pastoral appointment was as curate at St Oswald's Church, Glasgow (1968–1970), then as a curate at Old Saint Paul's, Edinburgh (1970–1975). He served as the chaplain to King's College, Cambridge (1975–1977) and the principal of the Institute of Christian Studies, All Saints, Margaret Street, London (1977–1978). He was then Rector of Dunoon (1978–1981) and the succentor at Exeter Cathedral in 1981. His last appointment before being ordained to the episcopate was as precentor and a residentiary canon of St Edmundsbury Cathedral.

=== Episcopal ministry ===
Shaw was elected Bishop of Argyll and The Isles at a meeting of the electoral synod in Oban in March 2004. He was consecrated and installed at a service on 8 June 2004 at St John's Episcopal Cathedral, Oban. After serving as bishop of the Diocese of Argyll and The Isles for five years, he retired in September 2009.

Since 2010, Shaw had been an honorary assistant bishop in the Diocese of Exeter. On 11 February 2017, fourteen retired bishops signed an open letter to the then-serving bishops of the Church of England. In an unprecedented move, they expressed their opposition to the House of Bishops' report to General Synod on sexuality, which recommended no change to the Church's canons or practices around sexuality. By 13 February, a serving bishop (Alan Wilson, Bishop of Buckingham) and nine further retired bishops — including Shaw — had added their signatures; on 15 February, the report was rejected by synod.

== Personal life ==
Shaw is married to Elspeth. Together, they have two children; Madeleine and Ben.

Scottish Episcopal Church titles
Preceded by Douglas Cameron	Bishop of Argyll and The Isles; 2004–2009	Succeeded by Kevin Pearson
