= Frederick Moir =

Frederick Moir may refer to:

- Frederick Moir (priest), Anglican priest
- Frederick Moir (African Lakes Corporation) (1852–1939), trader, road-builder and writer in Nyasaland, East Africa
