= Richard Wimbush =

English Anglican bishop (1909–1994)

The Right Reverend Richard Wimbush
- Bishop of Argyll and The Isles; Primus of the Scottish Episcopal Church
- Church: Scottish Episcopal Church
- Diocese: Argyll and The Isles
- Elected: 1963
- In office: 1963-1977
- Predecessor: Thomas Hannay
- Successor: George Henderson
- Other posts: Primus of the Scottish Episcopal Church (1974-1977); Assistant Bishop of York (1977-1994)

Orders
- Ordination: 1935
- Consecration: 1963

Personal details
- Born: 18 March 1909 Terrington, Yorkshire, England
- Died: 4 January 1994 (aged 84) York, Yorkshire, England
- Denomination: Anglican
- Spouse: Mollie Smith
- Children: 4

Richard Knyvet Wimbush, MBE (18 March 1909 – 4 January 1994) was an English Anglican bishop. Before becoming a bishop, he was a priest in the Church of England and then Principal of Edinburgh Theological College. He was Bishop of Argyll and The Isles from 1963 and also Primus of the Scottish Episcopal Church from 1974. He resigned his bishopric in 1977 to return to being a parish priest in the Church of England.

== Biography ==
Wimbush was born into an ecclesiastical family on 18 March 1909. He was educated at Haileybury, Oriel College, Oxford and Ripon College Cuddesdon.

He was ordained in 1935. He began his career as Curate of his old Ripon College Cuddesdon and then held similar posts at Pocklington and Harrogate. After this he was Rector of Melsonby and then Principal of Edinburgh Theological College. In 1963, he became Bishop of Argyll and The Isles. From 1974, he was also Primus of the Scottish Episcopal Church. Resigning in 1977 he became Priest in charge of Etton with Dalton Holme and an Assistant Bishop of York.

He died on 4 January 1994.

Religious titles
Preceded by Thomas Hannay	Bishop of Argyll and The Isles; 1963 – 1977	Succeeded by George Kennedy Buchanan Henderson
Preceded by Francis Moncrieff	Primus of the Scottish Episcopal Church; 1974 – 1977	Succeeded by Alastair Haggart
