= Roy Flatt =

English clergyman (1947–2011)

Roy Francis Ferguson Flatt
- Dean of Argyll and The Isles
- Church: Scottish Episcopal Church
- Diocese: Diocese of Argyll and The Isles
- In office: 1999–2005

Orders
- Ordination: 1981

Personal details
- Born: September 4, 1947 Bury St Edmunds, England
- Died: March 13, 2011 (aged 63)
- Denomination: Anglican
- Education: University of Strathclyde

Roy Francis Ferguson Flatt (4 September 1947 – 13 March 2011) was an English clergyman who was ordained as a priest in the Scottish Episcopal Church, and served in the Diocese of Argyll and The Isles.

Born in Bury St Edmunds in 1947 and educated at King Edward VI Grammar School, Bury St Edmunds and the University of Strathclyde, Glasgow, he was ordained in 1981 and began his career with a curacy in Pittenweem, Fife. He was then Diocesan Secretary of Argyll and The Isles and later its Dean–-a post he held from 1999 to 2005. He was the Incumbent at Inverary. He died on 13 March 2011.

== Notes ==
Religious titles
| Preceded by John Henry James MacLeay | Dean of Argyll and The Isles; 1999–2005 | Succeeded by Norman Donald MacCallum |
