= Thomas Hannay =

English Anglican bishop (1887–1970)

The Right Reverend Thomas Hannay
- Bishop of Argyll and The Isles; Primus of the Scottish Episcopal Church
- Church: Scottish Episcopal Church
- Diocese: Argyll and The Isles
- In office: 1942–1962
- Predecessor: Kenneth Mackenzie
- Successor: Richard Wimbush
- Other post: Primus of the Scottish Episcopal Church (1952-1962)

Orders
- Ordination: 1910
- Consecration: 22 July 1942 by Logie Danson

Personal details
- Born: 10 June 1887 Liverpool, England
- Died: 31 January 1970 (aged 82)
- Denomination: Anglican
- Education: University of Liverpool

Thomas Hannay (10 June 1887 – 31 January 1970) was a Scottish Anglican bishop.

== Biography ==
Hannay was educated at the University of Liverpool and Queens' College, Cambridge and ordained in 1910. He began his career with a curacy in Holmfirth after which he with the Universities’ Mission to Central Africa in Nyasaland. In 1927, he came to the College of the Resurrection, Mirfield and was its Principal from 1933 to 1941.

He became Bishop of Argyll and The Isles in 1942, and in 1952 Primus of the Scottish Episcopal Church; retiring from both posts in 1962.

Religious titles
| Preceded by Kenneth Mackenzie | Bishop of Argyll and The Isles; 1942 –1962 | Succeeded by Richard Knyvet Wimbush |
| Preceded by John Charles Halland How | Primus of the Scottish Episcopal Church; 1952 –1962 | Succeeded by Francis Hamilton Moncreiff |
