= Nicki McNelly =

British Anglican priest (born 1962)

The Reverend Nicki McNelly
- Provost of St John's Cathedral, Oban
- Church: Scottish Episcopal Church
- Diocese: Diocese of Argyll and The Isles
- In office: 2012 to 2017
- Predecessor: Norman MacCallum
- Successor: Margi Campbell
- Other posts: Rector of St Cuthbert's, Edinburgh (2017–present)

Orders
- Ordination: 2009 (deacon); 2010 (priest) by Brian Smith

Personal details
- Born: Nicola Calder; 1 May 1962 (age 64) Tredegar, Monmouthshire, Wales
- Denomination: Episcopalianism
- Spouse: Iain McNelly (m. 1984)
- Children: Two

Nicola McNelly (née Calder; born 1 May 1962) is a British Anglican priest. From 2012 to 2017, she was the Provost of St John's Cathedral, Oban in the Scottish Episcopal Church. Since 2017, she has been Rector of St Cuthbert's Episcopal Church, Edinburgh.

== Early life and education ==
Nicola Calder was born on 1 May 1962 in Tredegar, Monmouthshire, Wales. Her parents had separated before she was born, and she was brought up by her single mother. The family attended the local Baptist Chapel. When she was seven, her mother remarried and the family moved to Ebbw Vale. There, they attended the local Presbyterian Church.

McNelly was educated at Ebbw Vale Grammar School, a state grammar school in Ebbw Vale. From 2007 to 2009, she trained for ordained ministry at Cranmer Hall, Durham, an Evangelical Anglican theological college. She completed a Diploma in Theology and Ministry (DipTh) in 2009.

== Career ==
=== Early career ===
Having finished school, McNelly joined the Women's Royal Army Corps (WRAC): she served in the Intelligence Corps between 1980 and 1984. Upon marriage, she took a short break from working and her later work would be dependent upon where her husband was stationed. From 1986 to 1989, she was the school secretary at Mountbatten Primary School in Celle, West Germany. From 1990 to 1993, she was a personal assistant (PA) to the Customer Services Director of Magnet Kitchens. Between 2001 and 2004, she held a number of administrative positions with SSAFA Forces Help while living in Cyprus and Northern Ireland. Then, from 2004 to 2007, she was a volunteer development manager for SSAFA in Northern Ireland.

=== Ordained ministry ===
McNelly was ordained in the Scottish Episcopal Church as a deacon in 2009 and as a priest in 2010. From 2009 to 2012, she was a curate and chaplain at St Mary's Cathedral, Edinburgh in the Diocese of Edinburgh. On 31 August 2012, she was installed as the new Provost of St John's Cathedral, Oban, one of two cathedrals of the Diocese of Argyll and The Isles. As provost, she was also the Rector of St James's Church, Ardbrecknish. In 2013, she was additionally made a canon of the Cathedral of The Isles, the other cathedral in the diocese. She left Oban to return to the Diocese of Edinburgh, and was installed as Rector of St Cuthbert's Episcopal Church, Colinton, Edinburgh on 6 July 2017.

== Personal life ==
In 1984 she married Iain McNelly. He was also serving with the British Army and, as she could not join his unit or be guaranteed the same posting, she had to leave the WRAC. Together they have two daughters.

McNelly was baptised an Anglican in 2001. She had attended Baptist and Presbyterian churches as a child. In 2006, she was encouraged to seek ordination by the then Chaplain General who told her she was being "disobedient" by not answering her call to ordination from God.

== Styles ==
- 2009–2012: The Reverend Nicki McNelly
- 2012–2017: The Very Reverend Nicki McNelly
- 2017–present: The Reverend Nicki McNelly

Scottish Episcopal Church titles
| Preceded by Norman MacCallum | Provost of St John's Cathedral, Oban; 2012–2017 | Succeeded by Margi Campbell |
