= Robert Macgeorge =

Robert Macgeorge may refer to:

- Robert MacGeorge (1808–1884), Anglican priest and author
- Robert Forsyth Macgeorge (1796–1859), early settler of South Australia
