= Samuel Hood =

Samuel Hood may refer to:

- Samuel Hood, 1st Viscount Hood (1724–1816), Royal Navy officer and politician
- Sir Samuel Hood, 1st Baronet (1762–1814), Royal Navy officer and politician
- Samuel Hood, 2nd Baron Bridport (1788–1868), British politician
- Samuel Hood (priest) (1782–1872), English priest
- Samuel Hood, 6th Viscount Hood (1910–1981), British diplomat
- Sam Hood (1872–1953), Australian photographer
