= Charles Copland =

Anglican priest

Charles MacAlester Copland was an Anglican priest.

Born into an ecclesiastical family on 5 April 1910 and educated at Denstone College, Corpus Christi College, Cambridge and Ripon College Cuddesdon, he was ordained in 1934 and began his career with a curacy at Peterborough Parish Church, after which he was a Mission Priest in Chanda District, Maharashtra, until 1953. He was then Rector of St Mary's, Arbroath until 1959 when he became Provost of St John's Cathedral, Oban-a post he held for twenty years. Between 1977 and 1979 he was also Dean of Argyll and The Isles.

He died four months short of his hundredth year on 12 December 2009.

== Notes ==
Religious titles
Preceded by George Kennedy Buchanan Henderson	Dean of Argyll and The Isles; 1977 – 1979	Succeeded by Ian George MacQueen Wilson
