= Douglas Cameron (bishop) =

Scottish Anglican bishop

The Right Reverend Douglas Cameron
- Bishop Emeritus of Argyll and The Isles
- Church: Scottish Episcopal Church
- Diocese: Argyll and The Isles
- In office: 1993-2004
- Predecessor: George Henderson
- Successor: Martin Shaw

Orders
- Ordination: 1963
- Consecration: 1993

Personal details
- Born: 23 March 1935 (age 91)
- Denomination: Anglican

Douglas Maclean Cameron (born 23 March 1935) was an eminent Anglican bishop in the second half of the 20th century and the very start of the 21st.

== Biography ==
Born on 23 March and educated at Edinburgh Theological College and the University of the South, he was ordained (after National Service in the RAF) in 1963. He began his career with a curacy at Christ Church, Falkirk after which he was a Missionary in Papua New Guinea eventually rising to be its Archdeacon. Returning to the UK he was Priest in charge of St Fillan's, Edinburgh. Incumbencies at St Hilda's Edinburgh, St Mary's Dalkeith and St Leonard's Lasswade followed, before his appointment as Dean of Edinburgh in 1991. He was Bishop of Argyll and The Isles from 1993 to 2003.

His brother Bruce Cameron was Bishop of Aberdeen and Orkney from 1992 to 2006.

== Notes ==
Anglican Communion titles
Preceded by Brian Albert Hardy	Dean of Edinburgh; 1991 – 1992	Succeeded by Timothy David Morris
Preceded by George Kennedy Buchanan Henderson	Bishop of Argyll and The Isles; 1993 – 2003	Succeeded by Alexander Martin Shaw
