= George Douglas (priest) =

Scottish Episcopalian priest

George James Cosmo Douglas (31 May 1888 – 7 07 January 1973) was a Scottish Episcopalian priest during the 20th century.

Douglas was born on 31 May 1888. He was educated at the University of Edinburgh and ordained in 1914.

He began his ordained ministry with a curacy at St Paul's Cathedral, Dundee, after which he was a chaplain to the British Armed Forces. After the war he became the priest in charge of St Andrew's and St George's Rosyth and then the rector of St John the Baptist's Dundee. He became Provost of the Cathedral of the Isles in 1949 and then, concurrently, Dean of Argyll and The Isles - posts he held until his death on 7 January 1973.

Religious titles
Preceded by Duncan MacInnes	Dean of Argyll and The Isles; 1952 – 1973	Succeeded by George Kennedy Buchanan Henderson
