= Martin Shaw (disambiguation) =

Martin Shaw (born 1945) is an English actor.

Martin Shaw may also refer to:

- Martin Shaw (composer) (1875–1958), English composer, conductor and theatre producer
- Martin Shaw (sociologist) (born 1947), British sociologist and academic
- Martin Shaw (bishop) (born 1944), Anglican bishop in the Scottish Episcopal Church
- Martin Shaw, a character in the TV series Revolution
