= Ian MacLeay =

Scottish Anglican priest

John Henry James "Iain" MacLeay was an Anglican priest.

Born on 7 December 1931 and educated at St Edmund Hall, Oxford, he was ordained, after a period of study at the College of the Resurrection, Mirfield in 1958. He began his career with curacies St John's, East Dulwich and St Michael's, Inverness, of which he was then Rector until 1970. He was Priest in charge of St Columba's, Grantown-on-Spey with St John the Baptist's, Rothiemurchus until 1978 after which he was canon of St Andrew's Cathedral, Inverness and Synod Clerk for the Diocese of Argyll and The Isles for a further nine years. In 1987 he became Dean of Argyll and The Isles a post he held for twelve years.

== Notes ==
Religious titles
Preceded by Ian George MacQueen Wilson	Dean of Argyll and The Isles; 1987 – 1999	Succeeded by Roy Francis Ferguson Flatt
