= McNelly =

McNelly is a surname. Notable people with the surname include:

- Jack McNelly (1949-2020), American curler and coach
- Leander H. McNelly (1844–1877), Confederate officer and Texas Ranger
- Nicki McNelly (born 1962), British Anglican priest
- Willis E. McNelly (1920–2003), American professor and writer

== See also ==
- McNally (surname)
