= Keith Riglin =

Scottish Episcopal bishop (1957–2023)

The Right Reverend Keith Riglin FKC FRSA
- Bishop of Argyll and The Isles
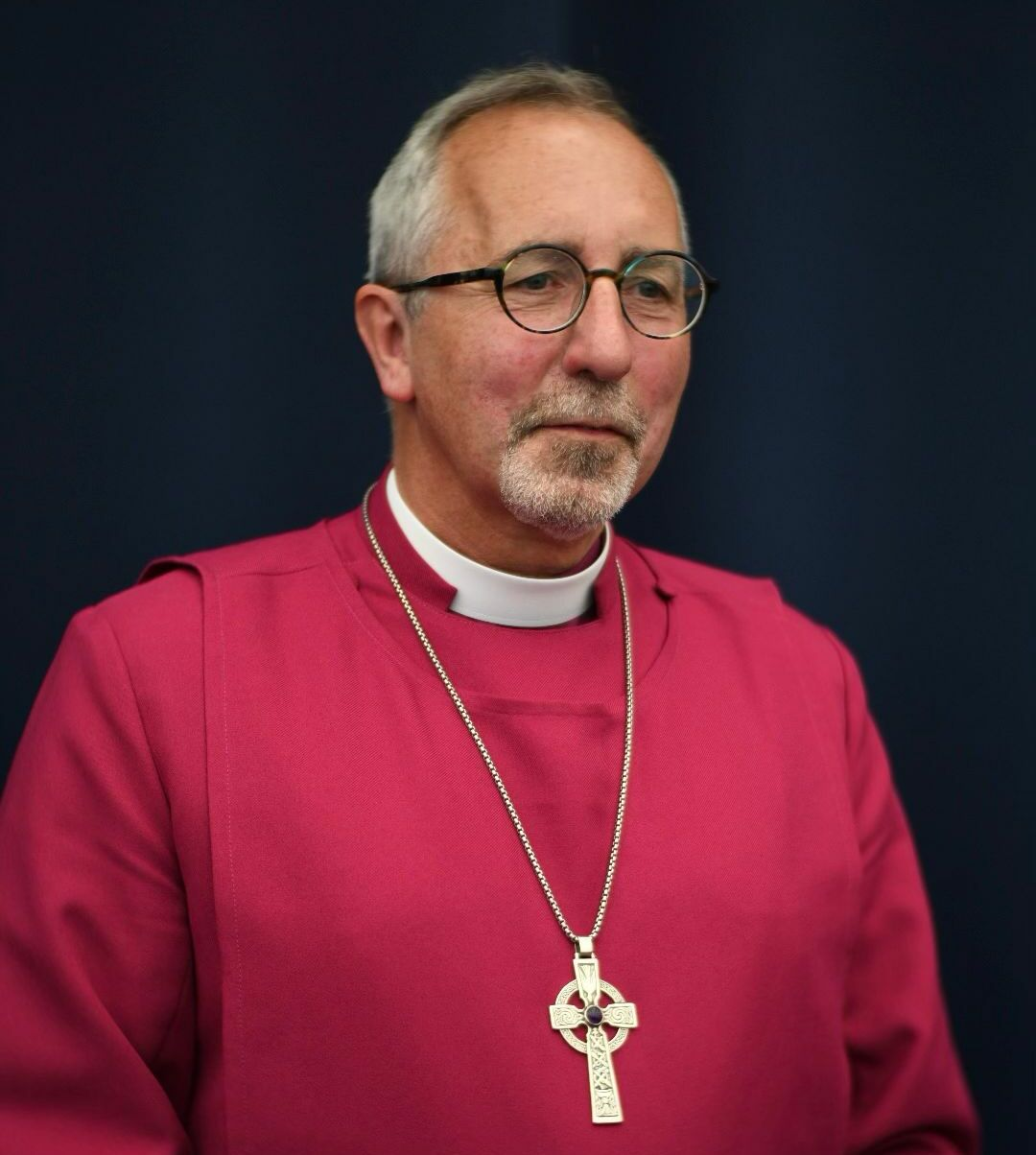
- Keith Riglin at the 2022 Lambeth Conference
- Church: Scottish Episcopal Church
- Diocese: Argyll and The Isles
- In office: 2021–2023
- Predecessor: Kevin Pearson
- Other posts: Provost, Cathedral of The Isles

Orders
- Ordination: 1983 (Baptist minister); 2008 (Anglican deacon and priest)
- Consecration: 1 May 2021 by Mark Strange

Personal details
- Born: Keith Graham Riglin; 24 January 1957
- Died: 24 September 2023 (aged 66) Paisley, Renfrewshire, Scotland
- Denomination: Anglican
- Spouse: Jacqueline Bryan (m. 1978; div. 2008) Jennifer Smith (m. 2010)
- Children: 2
- Education: College of All Saints; Regent's Park College; Heythrop College; University of Birmingham

Keith Graham Riglin (24 January 1957 – 24 September 2023) was an Anglican bishop in the Scottish Episcopal Church. Having ministered from 1983 within Baptist and Reformed churches, he took holy orders in the Church of England in 2008. In January 2021 he was elected Bishop of Argyll and The Isles, a post he held until his death in 2023.

== Early life and education ==
Riglin was born on 24 January 1957. After attending Priestmead Infant and Junior School in Kenton, Harrow, he passed the Eleven Plus examination and joined Downer Grammar School, Edgware, Middlesex. He read education and religious studies at the College of All Saints, Tottenham, then a constituent college of the Institute of Education, University of London, and graduated Bachelor of Education in 1980. Moving to Regent's Park College, Oxford as a ministerial student and for further studies in theology, he graduated Bachelor of Arts in 1983 and Master of Arts in 1986. He held a Master of Theology degree from Heythrop College, London, and a Doctor of Theology degree from the University of Birmingham, awarded in 1985 and 2008 respectively. In 1987 he studied at St Andrew's Hall, one of the Selly Oak Colleges in Birmingham, prior to his service with the Baptist Missionary Society in Jamaica. He was a visiting scholar at Westcott House, Cambridge for the academic year 2006–2007. In 2016, he was awarded the Associateship of King's College (AKC) by King's College London.

== Ordained ministry ==
=== Baptist and Reformed ===
Riglin was ordained as a Baptist minister on 25 June 1983 at Kenton Baptist Church, Harrow, Middlesex. He was associate minister at Manvers Street Baptist Church, Bath and a chaplain at the University of Bath from 1983 to 1987; lecturer in church history and the philosophy of religion at the United Theological College of the West Indies, Jamaica from 1987 to 1989; and minister of Amersham Free Church from 1989 to 1996. In 1997 he transferred from the List of Accredited Ministers of the Baptist Union of Great Britain to the Roll of Ministers of the United Reformed Church, to become minister and university chaplain (the latter also for the Church of Scotland) at St Columba's Church, Cambridge, a post he held until his move to the Church of England. Riglin was also a chaplain at Wolfson College, Cambridge from 1998 to 2008.

=== Anglican ===
In 2008, Riglin received holy orders in the Church of England: he was ordained as a deacon by Richard Chartres, Bishop of London, and as a priest by Edward Holland. He served his curacy as associate vicar at St Clement's Church, Notting Dale and St James' Church, Norlands, in Notting Hill, and chair of the ClementJames Centre. For three months in 2012 he served as interim rector at Christ Church, Lochgilphead. He was appointed a chaplain at King's College London at Easter 2012, where he also served as a visiting lecturer in theology and religious studies. In 2017 he was appointed vice dean of the college.

Riglin was honorary assistant priest at St Anne's Church, Soho from 2016, and at St Mary le Strand, London from 2017. He was an honorary chaplain (pastoral priest) at St Paul's Cathedral, London from 2010, and a director of ordinands in the Diocese of London from 2019. He was an authorised presbyter at Wesley's Chapel, London where his wife, Jennifer (Jen) Smith, serves as superintendent minister. In March 2020 he became an honorary canon of St John's Cathedral, Oban.

==== Episcopal ministry ====
In a unique online episcopal election on 30 January 2021, the Electoral Synod of the Diocese of Argyll and The Isles selected Riglin as its new bishop, following the translation of Kevin Pearson to the Diocese of Glasgow and Galloway in 2020.

His consecration took place at St John's Cathedral, Oban on 1 May 2021. The service was led by Mark Strange, Bishop of Moray, Ross, and Caithness and Primus of the Scottish Episcopal Church. Physical attendance was limited due to COVID-19 restrictions, but the event was streamed live to an online audience. From 2021 Riglin also became provost at the Cathedral of The Isles, Great Cumbrae.

=== Views ===
Riglin was a member of the Council of Christians and Jews, OneBodyOneFaith, the Prayer Book Society, the Society for the Study of Theology, and the Society of Catholic Priests.

== Other roles ==
Riglin was a senior member of Wolfson College, Cambridge, and chair of the Council and Governing Body of Regent's Park College, Oxford. He was a regular tutor at the Oxford University Summer School in Theology, a research associate at Wesley House, Cambridge, and a professor of the Graduate Theological Foundation. He became a Fellow of the Royal Society of Arts in 2009, and a Fellow of King's College London in 2021. Riglin was a director of the All Saints Educational Trust from 1993 to 2021, serving as deputy chair 2004-07 and chair 2007–21, for service of which the Bishop of London conferred upon him, in December 2021, the Order of St Mellitus.

Riglin was editor (with Julian Templeton) of a book of essays on modern practice - Reforming Worship: English Reformed Principles and Practice, published in 2012.

Riglin was a scholar of the Crabtree Foundation, and was orator in 2023.

== Personal life and death ==
In 1978, Riglin married Jacqueline Bryan. They had two children together, before divorcing in 2008. In 2010, Riglin married Jennifer Smith, an American-born Methodist minister who is superintendent of Wesley's Chapel.

Riglin died on 24 September 2023, at the age of 66.

== Styles ==
- The Reverend Keith Riglin (1983–2008)
- The Reverend Dr Keith Riglin (2008–2020)
- The Reverend Canon Dr Keith Riglin (2020–2021)
- The Right Reverend Dr Keith Riglin (2021–2023)

Religious titles
Preceded by Kevin Pearson	Bishop of Argyll and The Isles; 2021–2023	Vacant
