= David Railton (bishop) =

Scottish Episcopal bishop

The Right Reverend David Railton
- Bishop of Argyll and the Isles
- Church: Scottish Episcopal Church
- Diocese: Argyll and the Isles
- In office: 2024–present
- Predecessor: Keith Riglin
- Other posts: Provost, Cathedral of The Isles

Orders
- Ordination: 2008 (diaconate); 2009 (priesthood)
- Consecration: 28 August 2024 by Mark Strange

Personal details
- Born: 13 May 1966 (age 60)
- Spouse: Sarah (m. 1991)
- Children: 2
- Education: University of Bradford

David James Railton (born 13 May 1966) is a British Anglican bishop in the Scottish Episcopal Church. Since 2024, he has been bishop of Argyll and the Isles.

== Biography ==
Railton was born on 13 May 1966 in Withernsea, Yorkshire, England. He trained as a pharmacist at the University of Bradford. After university, he worked as a pharmacist in Derby, where he married his wife, Sarah, in 1991.

He was ordained in the Church of England as a deacon in 2008 and as a priest in 2009. He was a curate in the Diocese of Derby, then was incumbent in a three-church benefice based in Hazelwood and assistant chaplain to the Bishop of Derby. In 2015, he became vicar of two churches in Darlington in the Diocese of Durham.

In 2019, Railton left the Church of England for the Scottish Episcopal Church, and was named rector of Holy Trinity Church, Dunoon, and St Paul's Church in Rothesay, a linked parish in the Diocese of Argyll and the Isles. In May 2024, he was elected bishop of Argyll and the Isles in succession to Keith Riglin, who had died in November 2023. He was consecrated and installed at St. John's Cathedral, Oban, on 28 August 2024, and was seated as provost at the Cathedral of The Isles on Great Cumbrae in October 2024.

Religious titles
| Preceded by Keith Riglin | Bishop of Argyll and the Isles; Since 2024 | Incumbent |
