= Dunbeath air crash =

1942 Crash of an RAF Short Sunderland

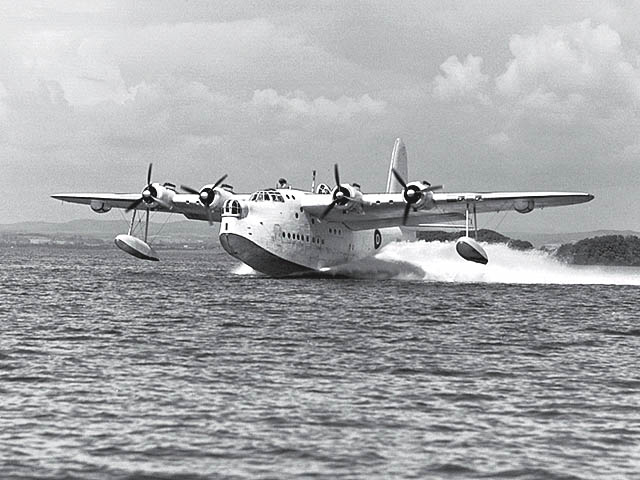
- Short Sunderland Mk. III (similar aircraft)

Accident
- Date: 25 August 1942
- Summary: Controlled flight into terrain
- Site: Eagle's Rock, near Dunbeath, Caithness, Scotland; 58°14′06″N 3°31′00″W

Aircraft
- Aircraft type: Short Sunderland Mk. III
- Operator: No. 228 Squadron RAF, Royal Air Force
- Registration: W4026
- Flight origin: RAF Invergordon, Scotland
- Destination: RAF Reykjavik, Iceland
- Passengers: 4
- Crew: 11
- Fatalities: 14
- Injuries: 1
- Survivors: 1

A Short Sunderland Mk. III flying boat crashed in the Scottish Highlands, on a headland known as Eagle's Rock (Scottish Gaelic: Creag na h-Iolaire) near Dunbeath, Caithness, on 25 August 1942. The crash killed 14 of the 15 passengers and crew, including Prince George, Duke of Kent, the king's brother, who was on duty as an Air Commodore in the Royal Air Force on a mission to Reykjavík. A Royal Air Force Board of Inquiry determined that the crash was the result of a navigational error by the crew leading to controlled flight into terrain.

== Background ==
The aircraft of No. 228 Squadron RAF, was based at RAF Oban on the West Coast of Scotland. 228 Squadron was part of 18 Group, involved in long-range maritime operations and particularly anti-submarine warfare, reconnaissance and long-range liaison flights. The aircraft flew from Oban to Invergordon on 23 August. Wing Commander Thomas Moseley, the commander of 228 Squadron was onboard. The Duke arrived at Invergordon by train on 24 August with a small entourage including his secretary Lt J Lowther RNVR, equerry Pilot Officer Hon Michael Strutt RCAF (Note: brother to the Duchess of Norfolk) and his batman LAC Hales, RAFVR

The captain of the aircraft was Flight Lieutenant Frank Goyen (Note: Although an Australian, Goyen had enlisted in the RAF in 1938), Moseley was 1st pilot, Pilot officer S W Smith RAAF was 2nd pilot. P/O Saunders RAFVR was the navigator (Note: The squadron navigation officer had been selected but following protests the navigator for the flight was chosen by drawing lot). The rest of the aircrew was Goyen's regular crew of three wireless/air gunners Blacklock (RNZAF), Catt and Jack and four fitters Jones,Lewis, Hewardine and Sweett.

== The accident ==
The aircraft and crew were on a VIP transport mission to RAF Reykjavik, specifically to fly Prince George, Duke of Kent, to Iceland in his role as the Inspector-General of RAF Welfare. As well as touring RAF bases on Iceland he was going to visit Royal Navy and British Army establishments and make goodwill visit to the American forces that were taking over the garrisoning of Iceland from the British.

The weather on the day was low stratus cloud with base at 300 to 2,000 ft; below it visibility was poor with some coastal fog, sea was calm with a light wind. The aircraft was at near maximum weight with sufficient fuel for 16 hours flight at 110 mph. The flight route was to fly east to the Cromarty Firth then north east keeping clear of the coast to level with Wick before turning first north then north west along the Pentland Firth and on past the Faroes to Iceland.

The aircraft took off from the seaplane base at RAF Invergordon on the Cromarty Firth in north East Scotland at 13:05 GMT on Sunday 25 August 1942 in fog, which persisted. The Sunderland, flying on instruments, veered off its planned flight path and crashed into the remote Eagle's Rock at 13:42 GMT. Fourteen of the fifteen crew and passengers, including the Duke of Kent, died in the crash. Sergeant Andrew Jack, the tail gunner, was the sole survivor.

A farmer and his son heard the aircraft and the explosion following the crash. At nearby Braemore, locals also heard the crash and the local medical officer was summoned; he collected a small search party which together with some of the local community and the police converged on the crash site. In 15-ft visibility caused by low cloud they were guided by the smell of petrol from the crash site. The first rescuers reached the crash about an hour after it happened. The Sunderland was on its back. Although the fuel tanks had exploded the depth charges it carried had not detonated (Note: Sunderlands were used in anti-submarine operations and carried eight 250 lb depth charges. If the aircraft detected a German U-boat on the flight (by eye or with its ASV radar) it was ordered to attack despite the presence of the Duke.). The medical officer, Dr Kennedy, found 11 bodies on the ground and three under burning wreckage; all had died instantly from multiple injuries.

Sgt Jack, who was normally the wireless operator had lost a toss-up with his fellow NCOs and so taken the rear gunner position on the flight. When the Sunderland crashed, the tail, including the turret, broke off. Jack was injured and knocked unconscious. When he came to and found himself the only survivor, he followed a river down the hill hoping to find habitation, missing the rescue party coming up. He collapsed and did not recover consciousness again until late the following morning when he set off down the hill again and found a croft. He was taken in and help summoned. Dr Kennedy who was at his house with RAF and Admiralty officers from London, tended to Jack at the cottage before he was taken to a hospital at Lybster. (Note: Dr Kennedy, although in his 70s, had been the first to attend several crashes in the preceding two years. He was later made Member of the Royal Victorian Order)

== Aftermath ==
The remaining bodies were collected from the crash site. The Duke of Kent's body was moved to Dunrobin Castle (Note: Dunrobin Castle, owned by the Duke of Sutherland a friend of the Duke of Kent, was in use as a military hospital) nearby, then to London and a funeral held was at St George's chapel at Windsor Castle on 29 August before burial in the Royal Burial Ground, Frogmore. Messages of condolence to the King and the Duchess of Kent were proposed in Parliament by Prime Minister Winston Churchill.

The others received a burial service at St John's Cathedral Oban on 15 September before local burial. Four of the 228 Squadron crew remain interred at Pennyfuir Cemetery in Oban. The Duke of Kent was the first member of a British royal family to die on active military service since the death of Prince Maurice of Battenberg who was killed in action on 27 October 1914 leading his infantry company into battle. .

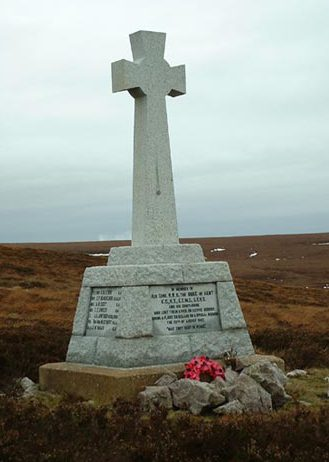
The crash site memorial at Eagle's Rock.

== Official cause ==
The RAF court of inquiry concluded that the plane crashed into the hillside because of an error of navigation; i.e., there was not enough allowance for wind that caused the aircraft to drift off its planned track up the eastern coast of Scotland. The pilot (Flight lieutenant Frank Goyen) was experienced and "of exceptional ability"; they had been properly briefed on route and the weather. The aircraft was off course and flying too low to clear the rising ground. The weather should not have been an issue for an experienced pilot and responsibility for the crash lay with the captain

The inquiry noted that that the engines were working at the time of impact.

== Sole survivor ==
Sergeant Andrew Jack, the aircraft's Wireless Operator/Air Gunner, recovered from the injuries he sustained in the accident, was later commissioned as a pilot officer in the General Duties Branch on 12 January 1945, and served in the RAF until 1964, retiring as a flight lieutenant. Jack died in Brighton in 1978 aged 56. In later life, Jack made allegations that the Duke had forced the crew to take off in bad weather, that the Duke had been flying and that alcohol had been consumed. The 228 Squadron Association repudiated the suggestion that the crew would have been drinking.

In 2003 Jack's niece claimed that Jack told his brother that the Duke had been at the controls of the plane (the Duke had held a pilot's licence since 1929); that Jack had dragged him from the pilot's seat after the crash; and that there was an additional person on board the plane whose identity has never been revealed.
