= Reginald Mapleton =

English Anglican priest

Reginald John Mapleton (9 December 1817 – 30 January 1892) was an English Anglican priest in the last quarter of the 19th century.

Mapleton was born in Christ Church, Surrey, to Rev. James Henry Mapleton. He was educated at St John's College, Cambridge. He was ordained deacon in 1842 and priest in 1843. He married Emily Male in 1849 and was Vicar of Great Glen, Leicestershire and then St Columba's Kilmartin before becoming Dean of Argyll and The Isles in 1886. He died in post in 1892.

His son, Lt Col Reginald William Mapleton RAMC (1851-1905), was an eminent doctor.

Religious titles
| Preceded by Frederick Robert Halsey Herbert Noyes | Dean of Argyll and The Isles; 1886 – 1892 | Succeeded by Arthur John Maclean |
