= Herbert Noyes =

Frederick Robert Halsey Herbert Noyes (29 November 1839 – 1 January 1917) was a British Anglican priest and author.

Noyes was born in Brussels, Belgium, the fifth son of Thomas Herbert Noyes and Mary Elizabeth Halsey of the Halseys of Gaddesden Place. He was Provost of the Cathedral of The Isles and Collegiate Church of the Holy Spirit, Millport, Isle of Cumbrae from 1875 to 1885; and Dean of Argyll and The Isles from 1883 to 1886 and later held incumbencies at Long Crichel with Moor Crichel and then Dunnington. He died in York on New Year's Day, 1917.

In 1916, his son Capt. Talbot Ronald Arthur Herbert Noyes was killed at the Battle of the Somme in the First World War.

Religious titles
Preceded by James Robert Alexander; Chinnery-Haldane	Dean of Argyll and The Isles; 1883 – 1886	Succeeded by Reginald John Mapleton
