= Oban Cathedral =

Oban Cathedral may refer to the following churches in Scotland:

- St Columba's Cathedral, Oban, of the Catholic Church
- St John's Cathedral, Oban, of the Scottish Episcopal Church
