= Norman MacCallum =

Norman Donald MacCallum (born 26 April 1947) was the Dean of Argyll and The Isles in the Scottish Episcopal Church.

Born on 26 April 1947 and educated at the University of Edinburgh he was ordained in 1972 and began his career with the Livingston Ecumenical Experiment. Later he was Rector of St Mary's, Grangemouth, Priest-in-charge of St Catharine's, Bo’ness and Provost of St John's Cathedral, Oban. From 2000 he was Administrator of the Scottish Episcopal Clergy Appraisal Scheme, a post he held until 2005. He retired in 2012.

Norman MacCallum, died suddenly on. 31st. July, 2016.

Religious titles
Preceded by	Provost of St John's Cathedral, Oban; 2000–2012	Succeeded by Nicki McNelly
Preceded by Roy Francis Ferguson Flatt	Dean of Argyll and The Isles; 2005–2012	Succeeded by Andrew Swift
