= Jerusalem the Golden (hymn) =

Hymn translated by John Mason Neale

- Genre: Hymn
- Text: John Mason Neale, Bernard of Cluny
- Based on: Revelation 21:1-2
- Meter: 7.6.7.6 D
- Melody: "Ewing" by Alexander Ewing

"Jerusalem the Golden" is a nineteenth-century Christian hymn by John Mason Neale. The text is from Neale's translation of a section of Bernard of Cluny's Latin verse satire De contemptu mundi.

== Origin ==
Richard Chenevix Trench included 95 lines from the beginning of Bernard's 3000-line poem in his Sacred Latin Poetry, published in 1849. They describe "the peace and glory of heaven", while the remainder of De Contemptu Mundi exposes earthly suffering and corruption. Based on Trench's Latin edition, Neale's translation "Hora Novissima" appeared in his 1851 collection Mediaeval Hymns and Sequences. Sections of his text were used for several hymns, including "The World is Very Evil", "Brief Life is Here our Portion", "For Thee, O Dear, Dear Country", as well as "Jerusalem the Golden".

In his introduction to the third edition of Mediaeval Hymns and Sequences in 1867 Neale noted that "Jerusalem the Golden" had already been published in twenty hymnals. As well as being adopted for Church of England services, it had become popular with English Dissenters and was being used in Roman Catholic churches. He remarked that "for the last two years it has hardly been possible to read any newspaper which gives prominence to ecclesiastical news, without seeing its employment chronicled at some dedication or other festival".

== Text (opening lines) ==
=== Trench's Latin version ===
Urbs Syon aurea, patria lactea, cive decora
Omne cor obruis, omnibus obstruis et cor et ora
Nescio, nescio, quae jubilatio, lux tibi quali
Quam sociala gaudia, gloria quam specialis
Laude studens ea tollere, mens mea victa fatiscit
O bona gloria, vincor; in omnia laus tua vicit.

=== Neale's English translation ===
Jerusalem the golden, With milk and honey blest,
Beneath thy contemplation Sink heart and voice oppressed.
I know not, O I know not, what joys await us there,
What radiancy of glory, What light beyond compare.

They Stand, those halls of Zion, all jubilant with song,
And bright with many an angel, and all the martyr throng;

when I fain would sing them my spirit fails and faints,
And vainly would it image the assembly of the Saints.

== Tune ==
The tune most often used for this text is known as "Ewing". Alexander Ewing composed the tune for the Aberdeen Harmonic Choir for use with "For Thee, O Dear, Dear Country", another hymn derived from Neale's translation of De Contemptu Mundi. The score first appeared in 1853 as a leaflet. In 1857 it was included in A Manual of Psalm and Hymn Tunes and it was published in 1861 in Hymns Ancient and Modern. For this publication the editor, William Henry Monk, changed the metre from triple to duple and used it for the tune of "Jerusalem the Golden". In his notes to the third edition of Mediaeval Hymns and Sequences in 1867 Neale remarked that Ewing's tune was "the earliest written, the best known, and with children the most popular" for use with "Jerusalem the Golden".
