= Alexander Ewing (composer) =

Scottish composer

- Born: 3 January 1830; Aberdeen, Scotland
- Died: 11 July 1895 (aged 65); Taunton, England
- Occupation: British Army officer
- Notable work: "Jerusalem the Golden"
- Spouse: Juliana Horatia Ewing

Alexander Ewing (3 January 1830 – 11 July 1895) was a Scottish musician, composer and translator. He was a career officer in the British Army's Commissariat Department and subsequently the Army Pay Corps. He composed the music for the popular hymn "Jerusalem the Golden".

== Family and education ==
Ewing was born in Aberdeen, Scotland on 3 January 1830. His father, a medical doctor, was a cousin of the clergyman Alexander Ewing, who served as Bishop of Argyll and The Isles from 1847 until 1873. Ewing studied Music and German at Heidelberg University and Law in Aberdeen, but did not qualify as a lawyer. A member of the Aberdeen Harmonic Choir and the Haydn Society of Aberdeen, he was regarded as "the most talented young musician in the city".

== "Jerusalem the Golden" ==
Ewing composed a tune for John Mason Neale's hymn "For Thee, O Dear, Dear Country" which was first performed by the Aberdeen Harmonic Choir. It was published as a leaflet in 1853 and later included in a Manual of Psalm and Hymn Tunes published in 1857. While he was serving overseas with the army, his relative the Bishop of Argyll and the Isles submitted the music to the editor of Hymns Ancient and Modern, where it appeared in 1861 as the tune for "Jerusalem the Golden". The hymn became very popular, but because the Bishop's name was also Alexander Ewing, he was generally believed to have written the tune.

== Life and work ==
In 1855 Ewing joined the British Army's Commissariat Department and served in Constantinople during the Crimean War. While on the D.A.C.G. staff in South Australia in the late 1850s he was one of the judges appointed by the Gawler Institute to select the music for Caroline Carleton's "Song of Australia", later a candidate for Australian National Anthem. From 1860 to 1866 he served in China, returning to England in 1866, and was with the army in Ireland during the 1867 Fenian Rising. He married the popular children's author Juliana Gatty on 1 June 1867 and the following week they left England for Fredericton, New Brunswick. When Deputy Assistant Commissary General Ewing (with the equivalent rank of Captain) arrived there, the bulk of the garrison was formed by the 1st Battalion of Her Majesty's 22nd (Cheshire) Regiment, which was headquartered in the city. His arrival occurred a few days after the British North America Act came into effect to create the Dominion of Canada, of which New Brunswick was one of the four constituent provinces. He was stationed in Fredericton until September 1869, three months after the last British troops had left the former colony of New Brunswick.

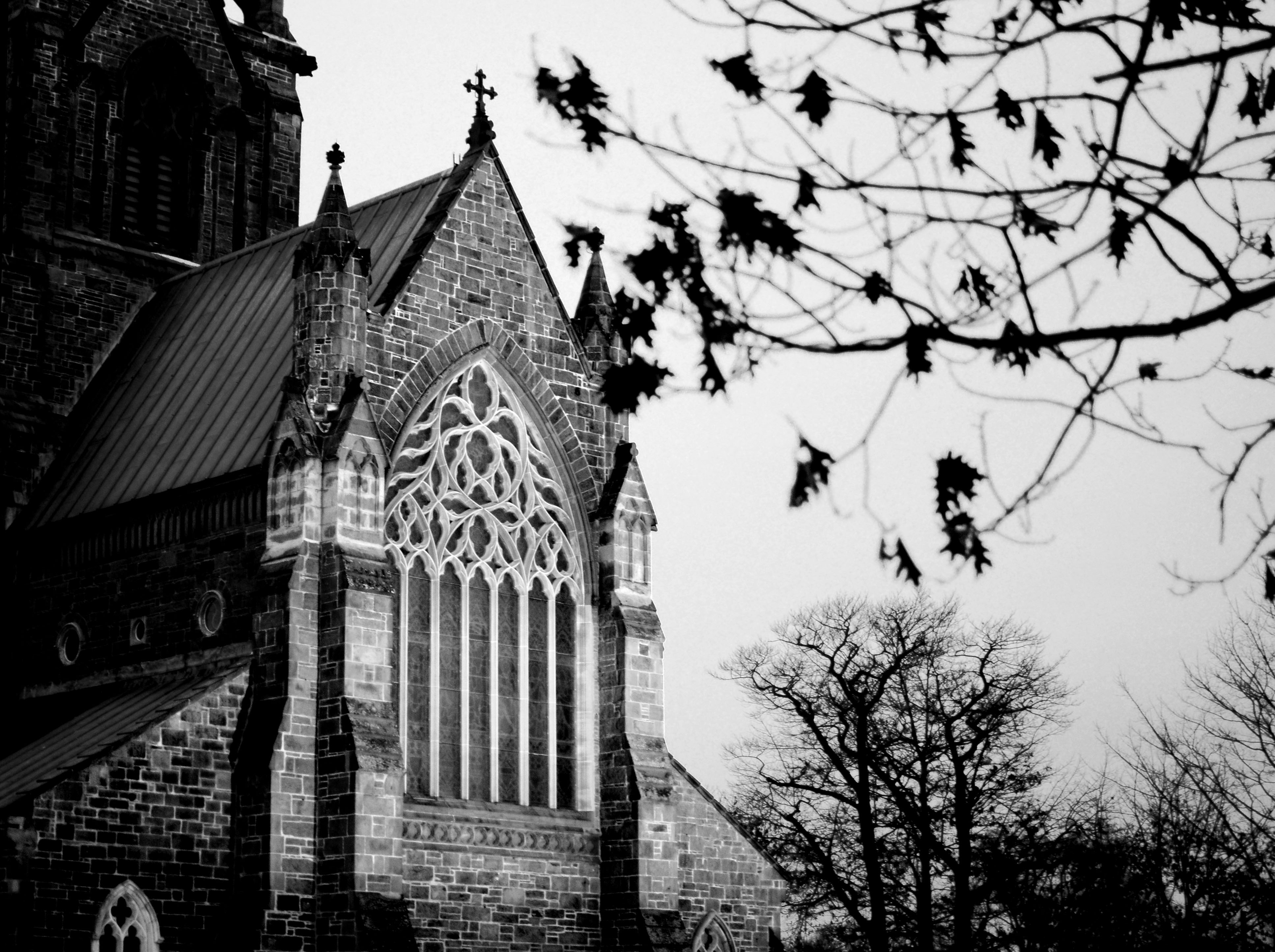
Christ Church Cathedral in Fredericton, New Brunswick

On their arrival in Fredericton the Ewings were befriended by Bishop John Medley and his wife. Ewing played the organ and sang in the choir at Christ Church Cathedral, where, his wife wrote in a letter to her family, "the choir generally are quite as much edified and charmed to see the author of "Jerusalem" & quite as much astonished to find (& still a little sceptical) that Argyll and the Isles is not the composer – as if we were all living in a small English watering place". Ewing also composed hymns for the cathedral choir.

On his return to England, Ewing was stationed at Aldershot Garrison. In 1870 he transferred from the Commissariat to the Army Pay Department.

While stationed at Aldershot, Ewing gave music lessons to the seventeen year old Ethel Smyth, who later became a notable composer. Her father was the commander of the Royal Artillery at Aldershot. He strongly disapproved of his daughter's musical aspirations but Ewing, having heard her play some of her own pieces, called her a "born musician who must begin her formal training at once". Ewing taught Smyth harmony, analyzed her own compositions, and introduced her to Wagner's operas. In her memoirs she described him as "a real musician" and "one of the most delightful, original, and whimsical personalities in the world".

In 1879 Ewing was posted to Malta and subsequently served in Ceylon (now Sri Lanka) before returning to England. He spent the last six years of his career in Taunton and retired in 1889. Juliana Ewing died in 1885 and Ewing was married a second time to Margaret Elizabeth Cumby (1842–1930). He died in Taunton in 1895. In 1899 a stained glass window by Charles Eamer Kempe in memory of Alexander and Juliana Ewing was installed in All Saints' Church in Trull, Somerset, overlooking their graves.

Ewing's translations of Flowers, Fruit and Thorn Pieces by Jean Paul and The Serapion Brethren by E. T. A. Hoffmann were published by George Bell & Sons.
