= Pennyfuir Cemetery =

Cemetery in Oban, Scotland

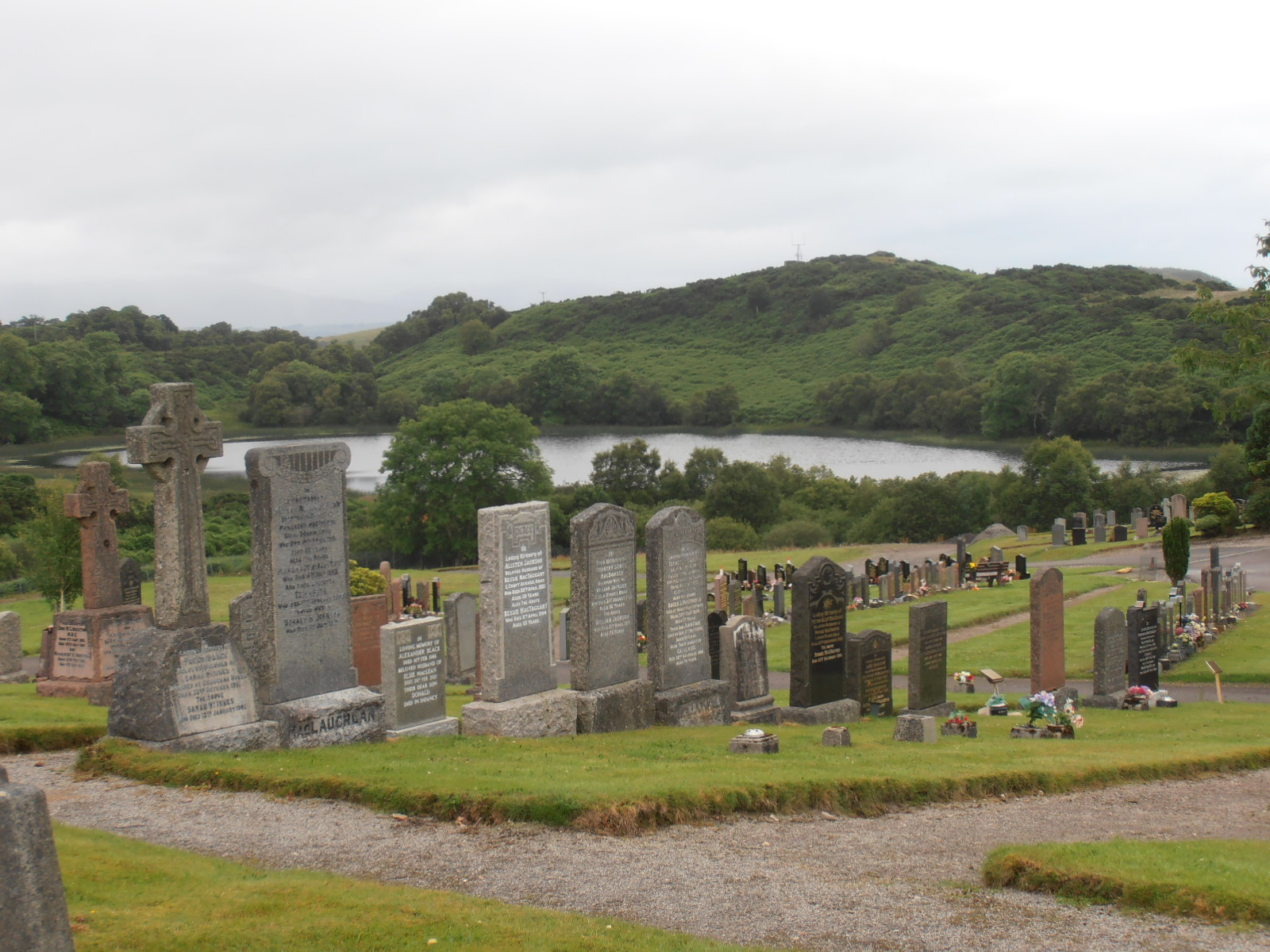
- The cemetery in 2006, looking north to Lochan Dubh
- Interactive map of Pennyfuir Cemetery

Details
- Established: 19th century
- Country: Scotland
- Coordinates: 56.4287°N 5.4616°W
- Find a Grave: Pennyfuir Cemetery

Pennyfuir Cemetery is a cemetery in Oban, Argyll and Bute, Scotland. It was established in the 19th century.

The cemetery contains 23 graves from the First World War and 58 from the Second World War. Four of the Second World War graves are of airmen who died in the Dunbeath air crash which killed Prince George, Duke of Kent, on 25 August 1942. In the centre of the war cemetery stands the Cross of Sacrifice, constructed from white Portland stone.

== Notable burials ==
- David Hutcheson (1799–1880), shipbuilder
- Peter Macnab (1812–1892), architect and joiner
- Frances Shand Kydd (1936–2004), mother of Diana, Princess of Wales
