= Samuel Hood (priest) =

Samuel Hood was an Anglican priest in the mid 19th century.

Hood was born at Devizes. He was Dean of Argyll and The Isles from 1842 until his death on 30 March 1872.

Religious titles
Preceded by James Paterson	Dean of Argyll and The Isles; 1842 – 1872	Succeeded by Robert Jackson MacGeorge
