= Robert Taylor (provost of Cumbrae) =

Anglican priest

Robert Oswald Patrick Taylor (b Howden 6 April 1873 – d Ringwood 14 December 1944) was an Anglican priest and author. Taylor was educated at St John's College, Cambridge, ordained in 1900 and served curacies at Horton, Blyth, Heaton and Edinburgh. He was Provost of Cathedral of The Isles and Collegiate Church of the Holy Spirit, Millport, Isle of Cumbrae from 1919 until 1926; and Vicar of Ringwood from then until his death.

== Bibliography ==
1.The Universe Within Us; A Scientific View of God and Man, 1931.
