= John Macarthur (priest) =

John Stewart Macarthur was Provost of Cathedral of The Isles and Collegiate Church of the Holy Spirit, Millport, Cumbrae from 1940 until 1949.

Macarthur was educated at Balliol College, Oxford and ordained in 1924. After a curacy in Glasgow he was on the staff of St. Michael's College, Llandaff before his time as Provost; and held incumbencies at South Luffenham and Huntspill afterwards.
