= Claude O'Flaherty =

Claude O'Flaherty was Provost of Cathedral of The Isles and Collegiate Church of the Holy Spirit, Millport, Isle of Cumbrae from 1926 until 1939.

O'Flaherty was educated at the University of Edinburgh and Edinburgh Theological College; and ordained in 1906. He served curacies in Glasgow and was Priest in charge at Gretna before his time as Provost.

His second wife was the sister of Harry Seymour Reid, Bishop of Edinburgh from 1929 until 1939. He died on 29 June 1955.
