= St John's Church, Ballachulish =

St John's Church
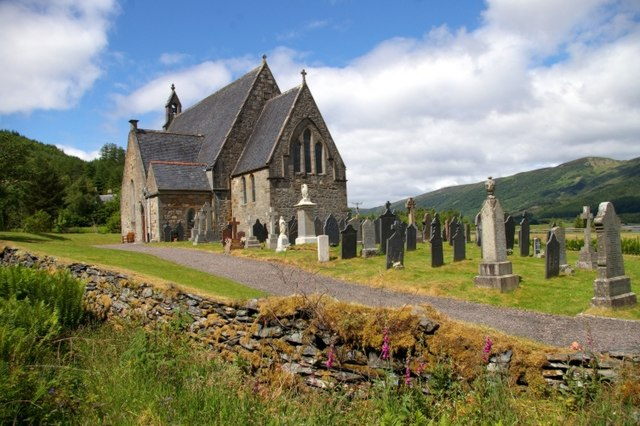
- The Victorian St John's Church
- St John's Church
- 56°40′39″N 5°09′19″W
- Location: Ballachulish, Highland
- Country: Scotland
- Denomination: Scottish Episcopal Church
- Website: whrsec.org.uk/st-johns-church-ballachulish/

History
- Dedication: St John

Architecture
- Architect: Peter Macnab
- Completed: 1842 (184 years ago)

Administration
- Diocese: Diocese of Argyll and the Isles

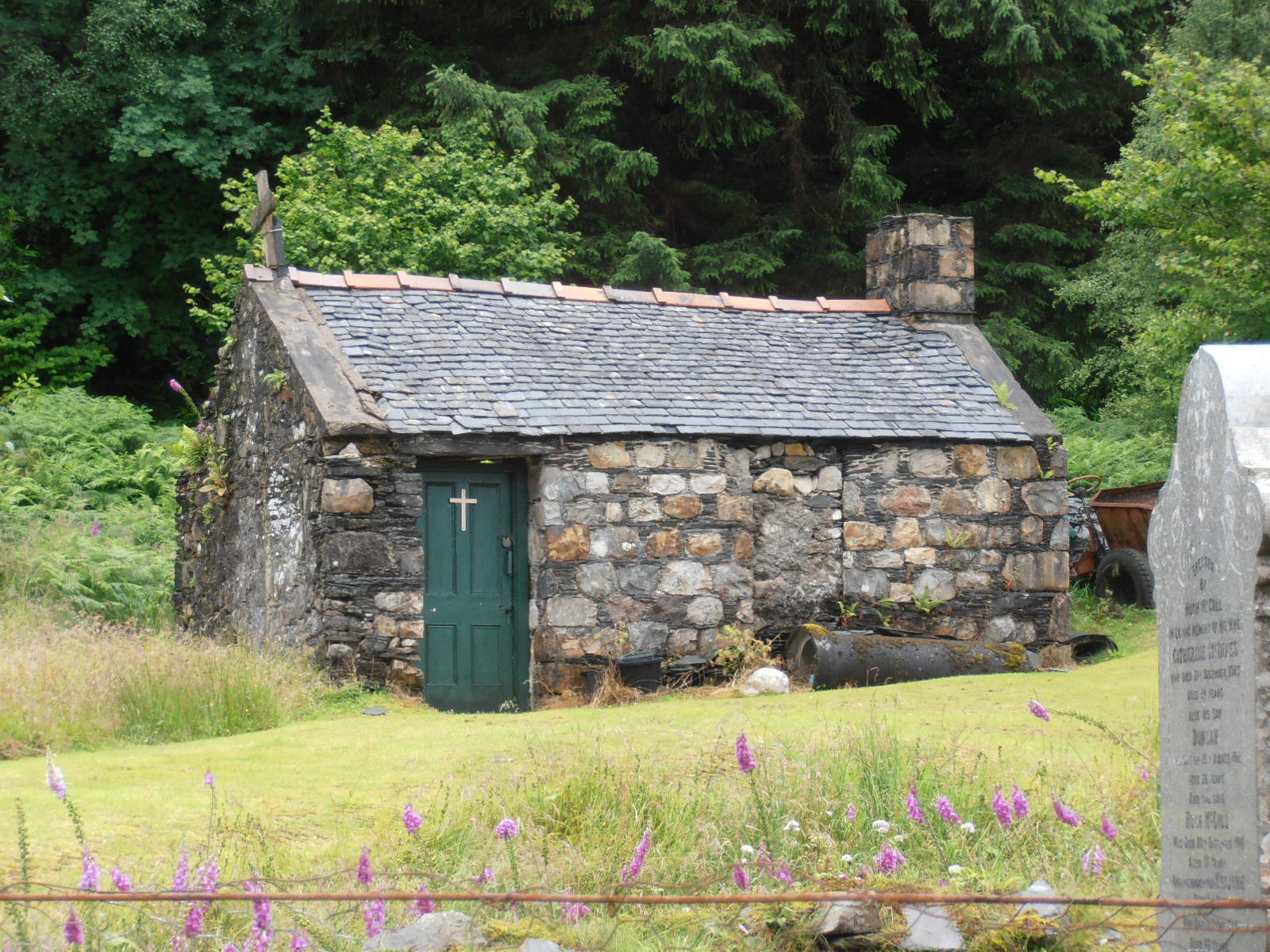
2016 view, looking south, of the old church

St John's Church is an active Scottish Episcopal Church congregation in Ballachulish, Highland, Scotland. It is part of the West Highland Region of the diocese of Argyll and the Isles of the Scottish Episcopal Church. Revd Amanda Fairclough is the priest in charge.

The current church building dates to 1842, replacing an earlier church. It was designed by Oban architect Peter Macnab. The church is a Category C listed building. The nave was built in 1842; the chancel was added by David Mackintosh in 1888. The altar and gilded reredos are by J. W. M. Wedderburn, 1888. The main entrance is in the centre of the western gable; a secondary entrance is located in the eastern end of the northern wall.

The former church building stands a few yards southeast of the present church. Local tradition has it that this was the store house from which Bishop Forbes preached in 1770; it was later consecrated as a chapel.

The church's burial ground, which features a ha-ha at the seaward boundary, is Category B listed. According to Historic Environment Scotland, it contains an "exceptional collection of 19th-century finely inscribed" tomb stones; many are of Ballachulish slate.

== Appin chalice ==
The Appin chalice and paten is thought to have been used to give the Appin Regiment, mostly Episcopalian Stewarts of Clan Stewart of Appin, communion before the Battle of Culloden in 1746.

In 1717 the Episcopalian Reverend John McLauchlan became the priest in the parish of Appin which at that time included Ballachullish. Six years later McLauchlan acquired a new silver chalice and paten. On the chalice was inscribed “The Parish of Appen, 1723”.

The communion set featured on a 2026 episode of The Repair Shop on the Road.

== Burial ground ==
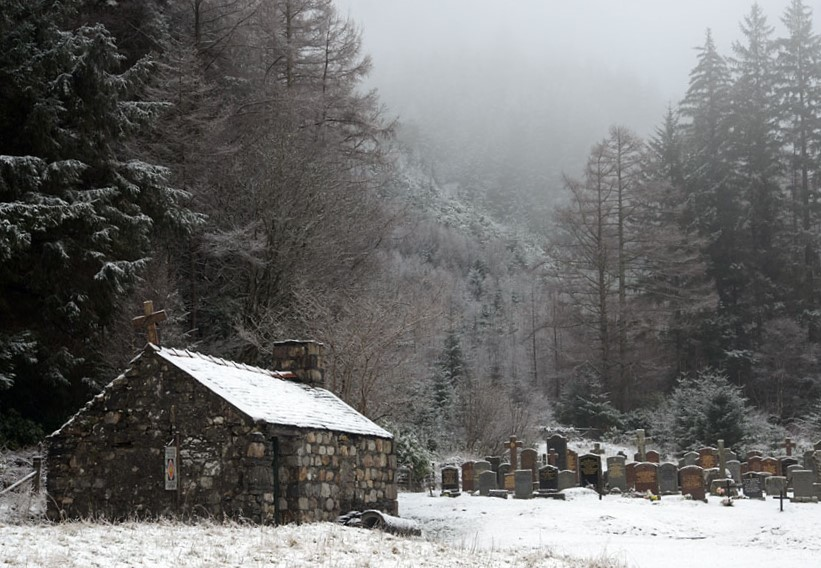
The church's burial ground, to the west of the church

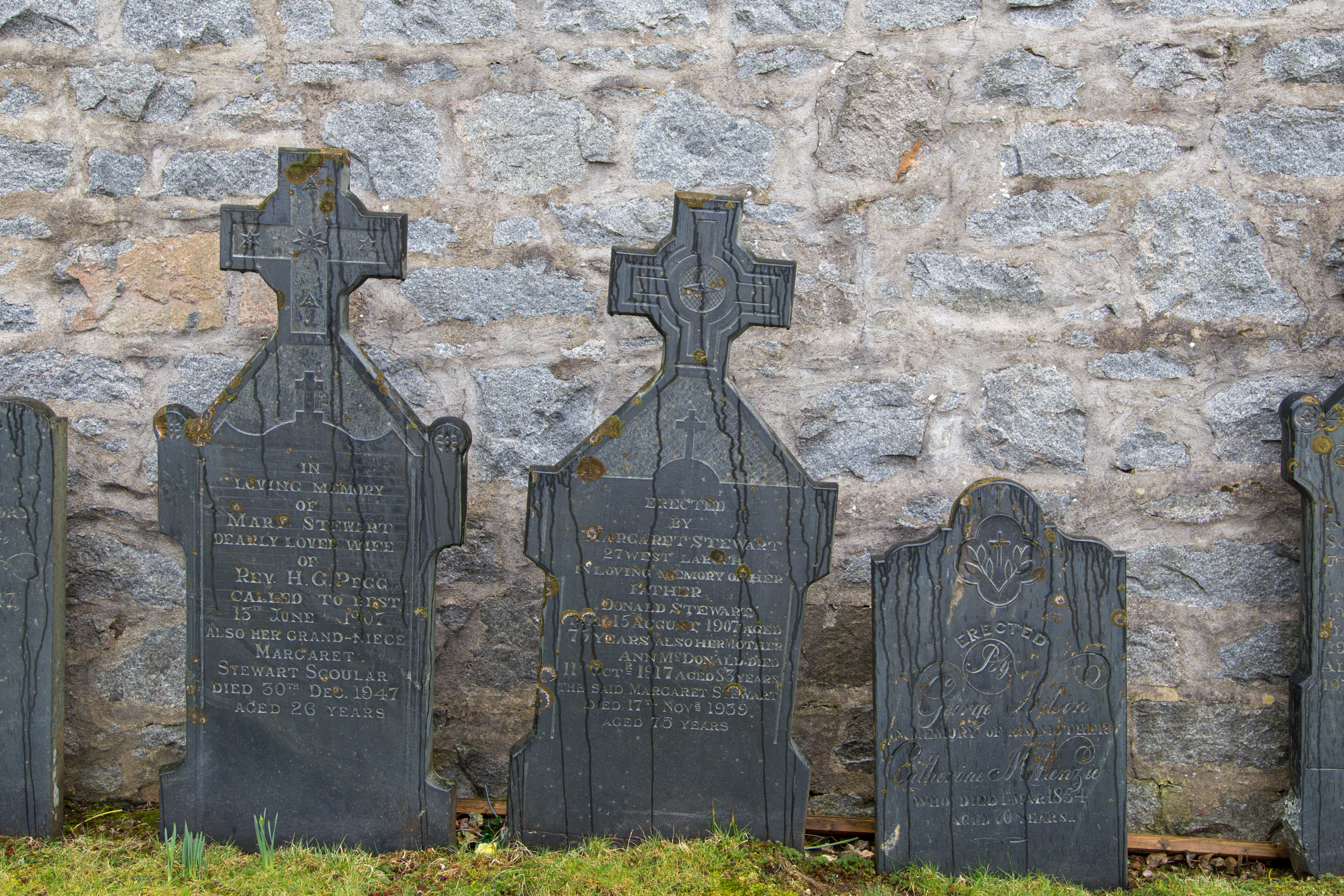
Slate headstones in the burial ground

== See also ==
- Alexander Chinnery-Haldane
- List of listed buildings in Lismore and Appin
- St Bride's Church, Onich
