= Kevin Pearson (bishop) =

Scottish Anglican bishop (born 1954)

The Right Reverend Kevin Pearson
- Bishop of Glasgow and Galloway
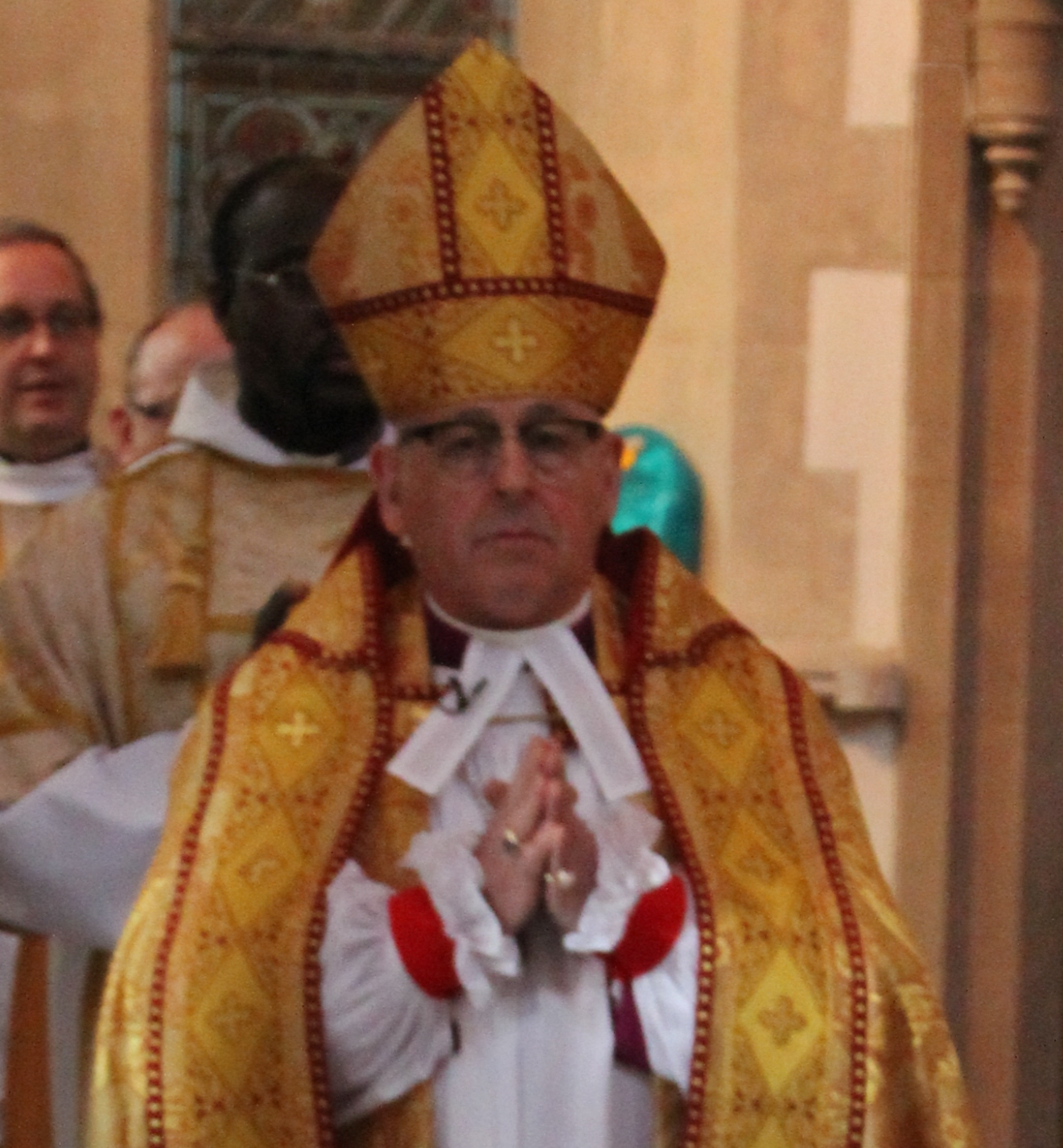
- Pearson in 2013
- Church: Scottish Episcopal Church
- Diocese: Glasgow and Galloway
- Elected: 18 January 2020
- In office: 2020–2024
- Predecessor: Gregor Duncan
- Successor: Nicholas Bundock
- Other post: Bishop of Argyll and The Isles (2011–2020)

Orders
- Ordination: 30 June 1980 by John Habgood
- Consecration: 4 February 2011 by David Chillingworth

Personal details
- Born: 27 August 1954 (age 71) Sunderland, England
- Denomination: Anglican
- Spouse: Elspeth Atkinson

Kevin Pearson (born 27 August 1954) is an Anglican bishop. He served as the Bishop of Argyll and The Isles in the Scottish Episcopal Church from 2011 to 2020. In July 2020, he served as the Bishop of Glasgow and Galloway from July 2020 to August 2024.

== Early life ==
Pearson was born on 27 August 1954 and brought up in Sunderland, England. He was educated at Leeds University, Edinburgh University and Edinburgh Theological College.

== Ordained ministry ==
Pearson was made deacon at Petertide 1979 (1 June) and ordained priest the next Petertide (30 June 1980) — both times by John Habgood, Bishop of Durham at Durham Cathedral — and began his ordained ministry as a curate at St Mary, Horden. He was rector at St Salvador Edinburgh from 1987 to 1993 and associate rector of Old Saint Paul's, Edinburgh, briefly from 1993 to 1994. He was priest in charge at Linlithgow from 1994 to 1995 when he became rector of St Michael and All Saints Church, Edinburgh, as well as dean of the diocese from 2004 to 2010.

He was elected Bishop of Argyll and The Isles at an Episcopal Synod held at the Cathedral of the Isles on 6 October 2010. He was consecrated and installed as bishop at Oban on Candlemas 2011 (4 February 2011). He was enthroned in the Cathedral of The Isles on 16 April 2011.

On 18 January 2020, Pearson was elected the Bishop of Glasgow and Galloway by the college of bishops. He was translated to the diocese on 1 July 2020 by letter, the planned enthronement on 4 July having been cancelled due to restrictions imposed by the COVID-19 pandemic. He retired on 31 August 2024.

== Notes ==
Anglican Communion titles
Preceded by Jim Mein	Dean of Edinburgh; 2004 to 2010	Succeeded by John Armes
Preceded by Martin Shaw	Bishop of Argyll and The Isles; 2011–2020	Succeeded by Keith Riglin
Preceded by Gregor Duncan	Bishop of Glasgow and Galloway; 2020–2024	Succeeded by Nicholas Bundock
