= Peter Macnab =

Scottish architect

- Born: 1812; Oban, Argyll and Bute, Scotland
- Died: 1892 (aged 79–80)
- Occupation: Architect

Peter Macnab (1812–1892) was a Scottish architect prominent in the 19th century. Notable for his church designs, several of his works are now listed structures. His offices were in Rangatira Place in Oban, Argyll and Bute. Rangatira Place no longer exists, but it did appear on valuation rolls prior to World War I. It was formerly the stretch of today's road that runs down to the esplanade from the A85 Dunollie Road.

He spent a period in "the Colonies", returning to Oban in the latter part of the 20th century.

As reported in the 7 November, 1893, edition of The Edinburgh Gazette, a petition was presented to the Lord Ordinary officiating on the Bills, "at the insistence if John Macnab, residing at No. 9 Harrington Gardens, South Kensington, London, for sequestration of the estates of the deceased Peter Macnab, builder, Oban". Presumed to be Peter's son, John died on 24 April, 1895, aged 69. He is buried in Brompton Cemetery, Kensington.

== Personal life ==
Macnab was married to Catherine Ferguson, with whom she had at least one child (John, born c. 1826).

== Selected notable works ==
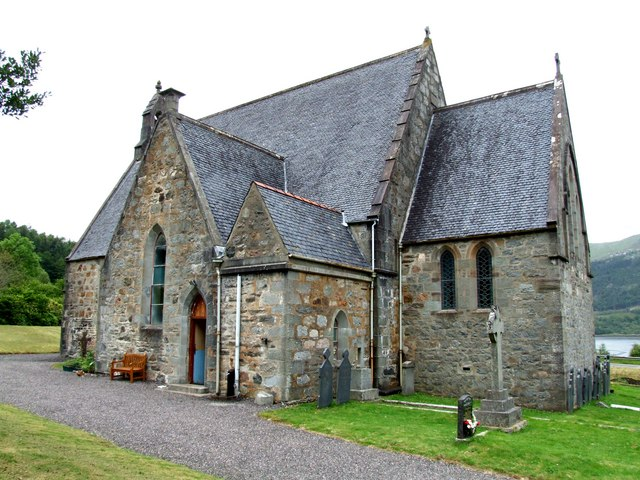
St John's Church, Ballachulish

- St John's Episcopal Church, Ballachulish, Highland (1842) – Category C listed
- Old Parish Church, Kilbride, Argyll (1843) – Category C listed; session house and some rebuilding
- Kirkapol Church, Tiree, Argyll (1843) – Category B listed
- 1–4 Victoria Crescent, Oban, Argyll (late 19th century) – Category C listed

He also submitted a design for Oban Free High Church, but it was rejected by John Campbell, 2nd Marquess of Breadalbane, in favour of one by David Cousin.

== Death ==
Macnab died in 1892, aged about 80. His wife survived him by 36 years. They are both buried in Oban's Pennyfuir Cemetery.
