= Thomas Ball (provost of Cumbrae) =

Thomas Isaac Ball was Provost of Cathedral of The Isles and Collegiate Church of the Holy Spirit, Millport, Isle of Cumbrae from 1892 until his death on 3 August 1916.

Ball was ordained in 1866 and served curacies and incumbencies in Edinburgh.

He lived in a flat at 12 Hill Square in Edinburgh's South Side.
