= De contemptu mundi =

Twelfth-century poem by Bernard of Cluny

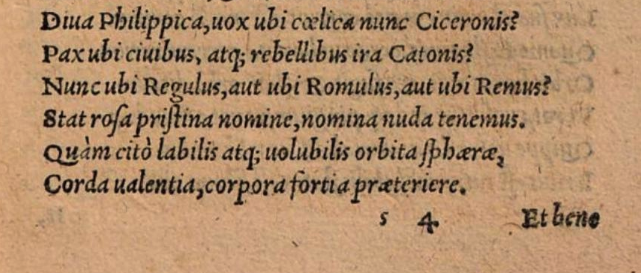

De contemptu mundi (On Contempt for the World) is the most well-known work of Bernard of Cluny. It is a 3,000 verse poem of stinging satire directed against the secular and religious failings he observed in the world around him. He spares no one; priests, nuns, bishops, monks, and even Rome itself are mercilessly scourged for their shortcomings. For this reason it was first printed by Matthias Flacius in Varia poemata de corrupto ecclesiae statu (Basle, 1557) as one of his testes veritatis, or witnesses of the deep-seated corruption of medieval society and of the Church, and was often reprinted by Protestants in the course of the seventeenth and eighteenth centuries.

== Themes ==
This satire does not proceed in an orderly manner against the vices and follies of his age. It has been well said that Bernard eddies about two main points: the transitory character of all material pleasures and the permanency of spiritual joys, the same themes as a much earlier treatise of the same name by Eucherius of Lyon, which Erasmus had edited and republished at Basle in 1520.

His highly wrought pictures of heaven and hell were probably known to Dante; the roasting cold, the freezing fire, the devouring worm, the fiery floods, and again the glorious idyl of the Golden Age and the splendours of the Heavenly Kingdom are couched in a diction that rises at times to the height of Dante's genius. The enormity of sin, the charm of virtue, the torture of an evil conscience, the sweetness of a God-fearing life alternate with heaven and hell as the themes of his majestic dithyramb. He returns again and again to the wickedness of woman (one of the fiercest arraignments of the sex), the evils of wine, money, learning, perjury, soothsaying, etc.. This master of an elegant, forceful, and abundant Latinity cannot find words strong enough to convey his prophetic rage at the moral apostasy of his generation. Youthful and simoniacal bishops, oppressive agents of ecclesiastical corporations, the officers of the Curia, papal legates, and the pope himself are treated with no less severity than in Dante or in the sculptures of medieval cathedrals.

The early half of the twelfth century saw the appearance of several new factors of secularism unknown to an earlier and more simply religious time: the increase of commerce and industry resultant from the Crusades, the growing independence of medieval cities, the secularization of Benedictine life, the development of pageantry and luxury in a hitherto rude feudal world, the reaction from the terrible conflict of State and Church in the latter half of the 11th century. The song of the Cluniac is a great cry of pain wrung from a deeply religious and even mystical soul at the first dawning consciousness of a new order of human ideals and aspirations. The poet-preacher is also a prophet; Antichrist, he says, is born in Spain; Elijah has come to life again in the Orient. The last days are at hand, and it behoves the true Christian to awake and be ready for the dissolution of an order now grown intolerable, in which religion itself is henceforth represented by cant and hypocrisy.

== Structure ==
The metre of this poem is no less remarkable than its diction; it is a dactylic hexameter in three sections, with mostly bucolic caesura alone, with tailed rhymes and a feminine leonine rhyme between the two first sections; the verses are technically known as leonini cristati trilices dactylici, and are so difficult to construct in great numbers that the writer claims divine inspiration (the impulse and inflow of the Spirit of Wisdom and Understanding) as the chief agency in the execution of so long an effort of this kind. The poem begins:

Hora novissima, tempora pessima sunt — vigilemus.
Ecce minaciter imminet arbiter ille supremus.
Imminet imminet ut mala terminet, æqua coronet,
Recta remuneret, anxia liberet, æthera donet.

(These are the last days, the worst of times: let us keep watch. Behold the menacing arrival of the supreme Judge. He is coming, he is coming to end evil, crown the just, reward the right, set the worried free, and give the skies.)

It is, indeed, a solemn and stately verse, rich and sonorous, not meant, however, to be read at one sitting, at the risk of surfeiting the appetite. Bernard of Cluny is an erudite writer, and his poem leaves an excellent impression of the Latin culture of the twelfth-century Benedictine monasteries and Catholicism in France in general.

== Translations ==
Seven hundred years later Richard Trench published the initial stanzas of the poem, beginning "Urbs Sion aurea, patria lactea," in his Sacred Latin Poetry (1849). John Mason Neale translated this portion of the poem into English and published it under the title "Jerusalem the Golden" in his Medieval Hymns and Sequences (1851). Neale made revisions and additions to his earlier free translation when he published it in his The Rhythm of Bernard (1858). A number of well-known modern hymns, including "Jerusalem the Golden"; "Brief Life is Here Our Portion"; "The World Is Very Evil"; and "For Thee, O Dear, Dear Country", are translations of parts of this famous poem. The text found in the Psalter Hymnal is the most popular of the four hymns derived from Neale's translation.

American composer Horatio Parker composed an oratorio utilizing text from Bernard of Cluny's poem, Hora novissima, in 1893.

== Bibliography ==
- The Rhythm of Bernard de Morlaix, John Mason Neale, 1864. Latin text with English translation.
- De Contemptu Mundi Latin text, showing ternary structure.
- Bernardus Morlanensis, De contemptu mundi, Une vision du monde vers 1144 - Bernard le Clunisien. Latin text with French transl., introduction and commentary by André Cresson. (Témoins de notre histoire) Turnhout 2009.
- Scorn for the world: Bernard of Cluny's De contemptu mundi. Latin text with engl. transl. and introd. by Ronald E. Pepin. Colleagues Press, East Lansing, Michigan, 1991.
- The Scorn of the World: A Poem in Three Books, transl. and ed. by Henry Preble and Samuel Macauley Jackson. The American Journal of Theology vol. 10,1 (1906), pp. 72–101 (prologus and book 1) online, vol. 10,2 (1906), S. 286–308 (book 2) online, vol. 10,3 (1906), S. 496–516 (book 3) online.
