= Alexander Ewing (bishop) =

Scottish bishop (1814–1873)

The Right Reverend Alexander Ewing DD, LL.D., D.C.L.
- Bishop of Argyll and The Isles
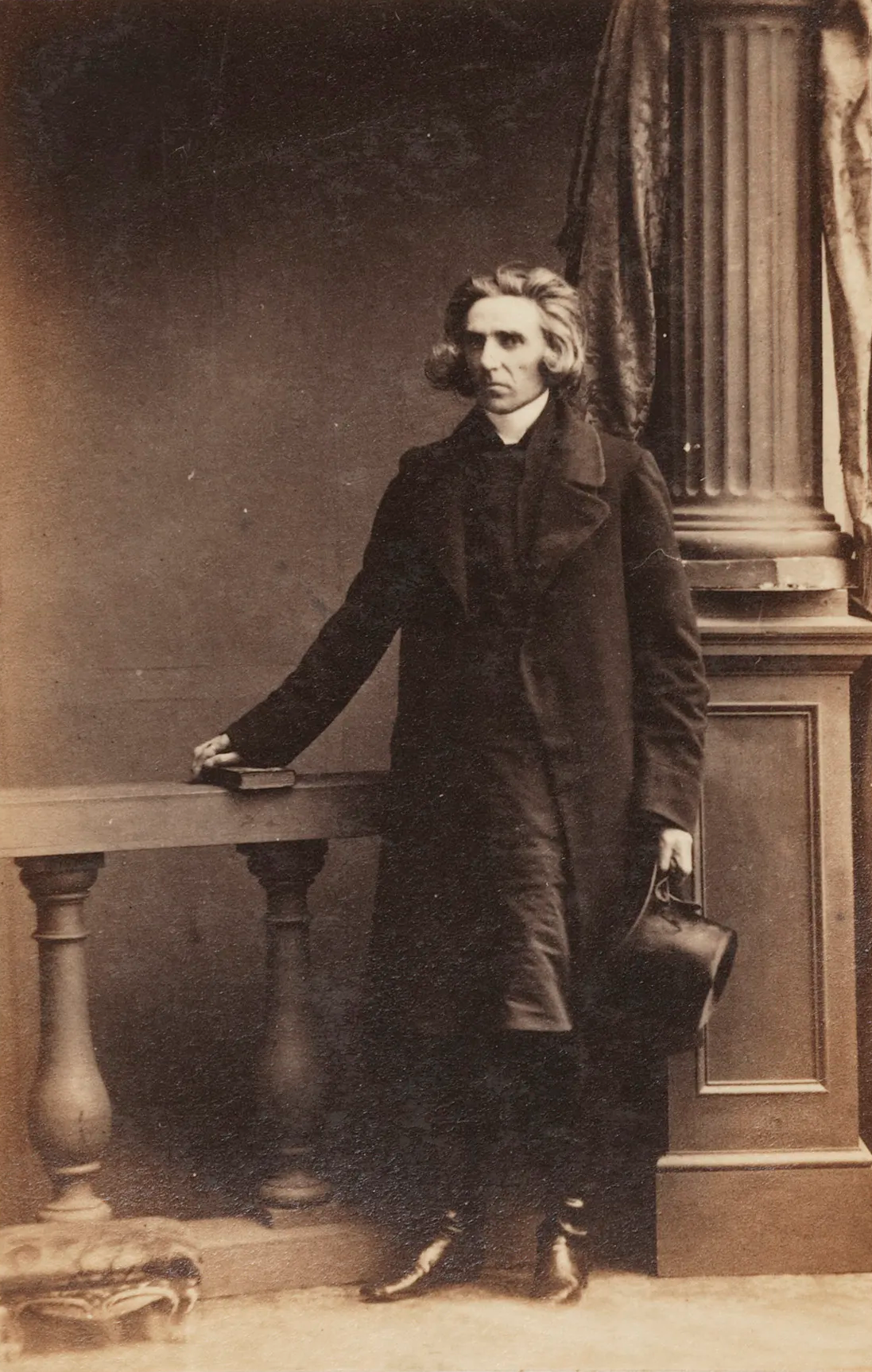
- Portrait by Camille Silvy, 1860
- Church: Scottish Episcopal Church
- Diocese: Argyll and The Isles
- In office: 1847–1873
- Predecessor: Inaugural appointment
- Successor: George Mackarness
- Other posts: Incumbent of Lochgilphead (1847–1873) and Provost of Cumbrae (1853–1867)

Orders
- Ordination: 1838 (Deacon), 1841 (Priest)
- Consecration: 28 October 1847 (Bishop)

Personal details
- Born: 25 March 1814 Aberdeen, Scotland
- Died: 22 May 1873 (aged 59) Westmill, near Buntingford, Hertfordshire, England
- Denomination: Anglican
- Parents: John Ewing and Elspet Ewing (née Aitkin)
- Spouse: (1) Katherine Stewart (2) Alice Douglas
- Children: Margaret, John, Alexander, Samuel, and Ludovic

Alexander Ewing (25 March 1814 – 22 May 1873) was a Scottish bishop.

He was born of an old Highland family in Aberdeen, Scotland. In October 1838, he was admitted to deacon's orders, and after his return from Italy he took charge of the episcopal congregation at Forres, and was ordained a presbyter in the autumn of 1841. In 1847, he was consecrated bishop of the newly united Diocese of Argyll and The Isles, the duties of which position he discharged till his death. In 1851, he received the Doctorate of Civil Law (D.C.L.) from the University of Oxford.

Though hampered by poor health, he worked cheerfully, and his personal charm and catholic sympathies gradually won him a prominent position. In theological discussion he was tolerant, and attached little importance to ecclesiastical authority and organization. His own theological position had close affinity with that of Thomas Erskine of Linlathen and F. D. Maurice; but his opinions were independent. The trend of his teaching is only to be gathered from fragmentary publications—letters to the newspapers, pamphlets, special sermons, essays contributed to the series of Present Day Papers, of which he was the editor, and a volume of sermons entitled Revelation considered as Light.

Besides his strictly theological writings, Ewing was the author of the Cathedral or Abbey Church of Iona (1865), the first part of which contains drawings and descriptive letterpress of the ruins of Iona Abbey, and the second a history of the early Celtic church and the mission of St Columba.

Ewing's daughter Margaret Nina married Alexander Crum, printer and MP, in 1863.

== Bibliography ==
- Feamainn Earraghaidhiell: Argyllshire Seaweed (1872)
- Revelation Considered as Light: A Series of Discourses (1873)
- Memoir of Alexander Ewing, D.C.L., by A. J. Ross (1877)

== See also ==
- Alexander Ewing (composer) (1830–1895), a cousin, composed the music for the hymn "Jerusalem the Golden".
