= Robert MacGeorge =

Priest

Robert Jackson MacGeorge was an Anglican priest and author in the 19th century.

MacGeorge was born in The Gorbals, Glasgow on 19 December 1808 and educated at the University of Glasgow and the University of Edinburgh. He was ordained in 1839 and served briefly in Glasgow before moving to Canada, where he was the incumbent at Streetsville, Ontario. In 1859 he returned to a post in Scotland at St John the Evangelist, Oban. After this he was Synod Clerk for the Diocese of Argyll and The Isles then its dean until 1880. He died on 14 May 1884.

== References and notes ==
Religious titles
Preceded by Samuel Hood	Dean of Argyll and The Isles; 1872 – 1880	Succeeded by James Robert Alexander; Chinnery-Haldane
