= Bishop of Argyll and The Isles (Episcopal) =

Diocesan bishop in the Scottish Episcopal Church

- Bishopric

anglican
- Incumbent; David Railton

Location
- Ecclesiastical province: Scottish Episcopal Church

Information
- First holder: Alexander Ewing
- Established: 1847
- Diocese: Diocese of Argyll and The Isles
- Cathedral: Cathedral Church of St John the Divine, Oban and Cathedral of The Isles and Collegiate Church of the Holy Spirit, Millport

The Bishop of Argyll and The Isles (Scottish Gaelic: Easbaig Earra-Ghàidheal agus nan Eilean) is the Ordinary of the Scottish Episcopal Diocese of Argyll and the Isles.

The Episcopal see was created by the union of the ancient bishoprics of Argyll and The Isles in 1847. The bishop has two seats: the Cathedral Church of St John the Divine in Oban and the Cathedral of The Isles and Collegiate Church of the Holy Spirit in Millport, Isle of Cumbrae, which is the smallest cathedral in the British Isles. There are two island retreat centres: Bishop's House is on Iona, while the College of the Holy Spirit is also in Millport.

The diocesan bishop, since August 2024, has been David Railton.

== List of the Scottish Episcopal Bishops of Argyll and The Isles ==
Bishops of Argyll and The Isles
From	Until	Incumbent	Notes
1847	1873	Alexander Ewing	
1874	1883	George Mackarness	
1883	1906	Alexander Chinnery-Haldane	Previously Dean of the diocese since 1881.
1907	1942	Kenneth Mackenzie	Previously Provost of St Paul's Cathedral, Dundee since 1905.
1942	1962	Thomas Hannay	Also Primus from 1952.
1963	1977	Richard Wimbush	Also Primus from 1974.
1977	1992	George Henderson	Previously Dean of the diocese since 1973; also Primus from 1990.
1993	2004	Douglas Cameron	Previously Dean of Edinburgh since 1991.
2004	2009	Martin Shaw	
2010	2020	Kevin Pearson	Previously Dean of Edinburgh; elected 6 October 2010; consecrated on 4 February 2010; translated to Glasgow and Galloway.
2021	2023	Keith Riglin	Consecration 1 May 2021.
2024	incumbent	David Railton	Consecration 24 August 2024.
