= Bishop's House, Iona =

Coordinates: 56°19′57″N 6°23′29″W

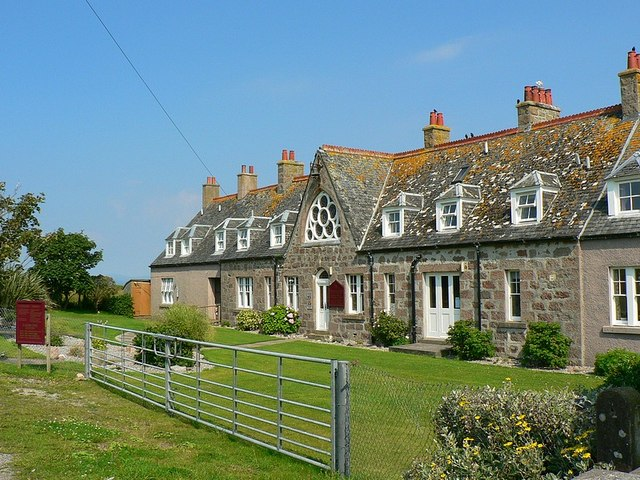
Bishop's House, Iona

Bishop's House is a retreat house for the Scottish Episcopal Church, located on the island of Iona, off the west coast of Scotland.

== History ==
It was built in 1894, when Iona Abbey was still in ruins, to provide a place for Scottish Episcopalians on the island. It was originally called Saint Columba's House, after the chapel at its centre dedicated to Saint Columba. It was established under Bishop Alexander Chinnery-Haldane, Bishop of Argyll and The Isles from 1883 to 1906, a year after the tenancy was granted by the 9th Duke of Argyll, as a place of "prayer, study, contemplation and Eucharist". Despite protests from the local established church minister the house continued to be supported by the Duke and the Bishop. Thanks to Bishop Chinnery-Haldane's close involvement with the project, the house became known as the Bishop's House, a title which has stuck.

The House was occupied by members of the Society of Saint John the Evangelist from 1896-1906. Despite the minister's fears they were seeking proselytes, they seem to have been more interested in avoiding the roof leaking and finding space for contemplation. Known as the "Cowley Fathers", they ran services and held tea parties for the islanders. It has since been run as a retreat house for the Scottish Episcopal Church, most recently by their subsidiary group Island Retreats Ltd. The Chapel is open to the public and holds two services daily from March to October, and weekly in the winter.
