= List of listed buildings in Lismore and Appin, Argyll and Bute =

This is a list of listed buildings in the parish of Lismore And Appin in Argyll and Bute, Scotland.

== List ==
Name	Location	Date listed	Geo-coordinates	Notes	Category	LB number	Image
Limekilns, Port Ramsay, Lismore			56°33′17″N 5°26′39″W		B	13341	Upload Photo
Limekilns, Stores And Pier, Port Kilcheran, Lismore			56°29′22″N 5°32′00″W		B	13342	Upload Photo
Gate Lodge, Aird's Estate			56°33′34″N 5°23′23″W		C(S)	12364	Upload Photo
Bank House (Post Office) Tynribbie			56°33′44″N 5°21′29″W		B	12336	Upload Photo
Portnacroish Cottages Portnacroish			56°34′20″N 5°22′44″W		B	12341	Upload Photo
Portnacroish Inn Portnacroish			56°34′20″N 5°22′46″W		B	12342	Upload Photo
Shuna Farmhouse			56°35′01″N 5°23′55″W		B	12343	Upload Photo
Portnacroish, St Cross Churchyard, Stalcaine Memorial			56°34′17″N 5°22′33″W		C(S)	12348	Upload Photo
Bachull House			56°32′14″N 5°28′36″W		B	12351	Upload Photo
Airds House			56°33′01″N 5°24′10″W		A	12363	Upload another image
Lismore Kirk (Formerly Cathedral Church Of St Moluag) Clachan			56°32′05″N 5°28′50″W		B	12349	Upload another image
Clachan, Kilmoluag House, Formerly Lismore Manse			56°32′02″N 5°28′53″W		C(S)	12350	Upload Photo
Hawthorn House (Near Bachull House)			56°32′14″N 5°28′30″W		C(S)	12352	Upload Photo
Cottages, 3-11 Port Ramsay			56°33′11″N 5°26′50″W		C(S)	12356	Upload Photo
Cottages, 12-13 Port Ramsay			56°33′08″N 5°26′54″W		C(S)	12357	Upload Photo
Kinlochlaich House			56°33′58″N 5°21′23″W		B	12367	Upload Photo
Invernahyle House			56°33′04″N 5°19′15″W		B	12338	Upload Photo
Castle Shuna			56°34′47″N 5°23′45″W		B	12344	Upload Photo
Port Appin, Old Ferry House			56°33′11″N 5°24′52″W		B	12421	Upload Photo
Achnacroish Cottage			56°30′51″N 5°29′37″W		C(S)	12346	Upload Photo
Castle Coeffin			56°32′12″N 5°29′32″W		B	12353	Upload Photo
Old Appin Kirk Tynribbie			56°33′52″N 5°21′20″W		C(S)	12366	Upload Photo
Achnacone House			56°33′41″N 5°20′34″W		B	12337	Upload Photo
Cottages, 1-2 Port Ramsay			56°33′11″N 5°26′49″W		C(S)	12355	Upload Photo
Kilcheran Home Farm			56°29′27″N 5°32′08″W		B	12359	Upload Photo
Lismore Lighthouse Eilean Musdile			56°27′20″N 5°36′27″W		A	12360	Upload another image
Benderloch Ferry House, North Shian			56°32′03″N 5°23′34″W		C(S)	12339	Upload Photo
Holy Cross Episcopal Church, Portnacroish			56°34′18″N 5°22′35″W		B	12340	Upload Photo
Castle Stalker			56°34′18″N 5°23′10″W		A	12345	Upload another image See more images
Achinduin Castle Acha-Dun			56°29′39″N 5°34′07″W		B	12358	Upload Photo
Sealladhnan Ellean Port Appin			56°33′20″N 5°24′34″W		C(S)	12361	Upload Photo
Appin Parish Manse (Old F.C. Manse.) Ardtur			56°33′45″N 5°23′04″W		C(S)	12365	Upload Photo
Old Corn Mill At Balngowan			56°31′11″N 5°29′10″W		B	12347	Upload Photo
The Old Smiddy, Port Appin			56°33′16″N 5°24′24″W		C(S)	12362	Upload Photo

== Key ==
The scheme for classifying buildings in Scotland is:

- Category A: "buildings of national or international importance, either architectural or historic; or fine, little-altered examples of some particular period, style or building type."
- Category B: "buildings of regional or more than local importance; or major examples of some particular period, style or building type, which may have been altered."
- Category C: "buildings of local importance; lesser examples of any period, style, or building type, as originally constructed or moderately altered; and simple traditional buildings which group well with other listed buildings."

In March 2016 there were 47,288 listed buildings in Scotland. Of these, 8% were Category A, and 50% were Category B, with the remaining 42% being Category C.

== See also ==
- List of listed buildings in Argyll and Bute
