= Frederick Moir (priest) =

Frederick Charles Moir (around 1870) was an Anglican priest.

Educated at Selwyn College, Cambridge (1893), his first post was as a curate at St Peter, Glasgow. After this he was the incumbent at St John, Dumfries and then Provost of St Paul's Cathedral, Dundee, a post he held from 1907 until 1920. Later he held posts at St Columba, Largs and St John Aberdeen before retiring in 1940. The 1947-48 Crockford's Clerical Directory states that he had permission to officiate in the Diocese of Moray, Ross and Caithness.

Religious titles
| Preceded by Kenneth Mackenzie | Provost of St Paul's Cathedral, Dundee; 1907 –1920 | Succeeded by Alan Campbell Don |
