= List of listed buildings in Lismore and Appin, Highland =

This is a list of listed buildings in the parish of Lismore and Appin in Highland, Scotland.

== List ==
Name	Location	Date listed	Geo-coordinates	Notes	Category	LB number	Image
Kentallen, Ardsheal House Gate Lodge			56°39′59″N 5°15′17″W		B	6878	Upload Photo
South Ballachulish, Ballachulish House Including Bothy, Walled Garden, Sundial, Boundary Walls And Gatepiers			56°41′03″N 5°11′17″W		B	6882	Upload Photo
Glencoe Village, Bridge Of Coe Over River Coe			56°41′01″N 5°05′50″W		B	6893	Upload Photo
Kinlochleven, Garbhein Road, Garbhein House			56°42′44″N 4°58′30″W		C(S)	46261	Upload Photo
Kinlochleven, The Royal Bank Of Scotland, Leven Road			56°42′47″N 4°57′59″W		C(S)	46264	Upload Photo
Kinlochleven, Road Viaduct At Leven Road			56°42′48″N 4°58′15″W		A	46265	Upload another image
Glencoe Village, Glencoe Hospital Gate Lodge			56°41′02″N 5°05′46″W		C(S)	6874	Upload Photo
Keil Chapel And Burial Ground			56°37′56″N 5°18′30″W		B	6877	Upload Photo
Glencoe, Achnacon House And Former Barn, The Leishman Centre			56°39′50″N 5°04′17″W		C(S)	6892	Upload Photo
Kinlochleven Aluminium Works, Carbon Factory And Silos			56°42′47″N 4°57′35″W		B	12926	Upload Photo
Kinlochleven Village Water Supply Dam (Near West Highland Way)			56°41′54″N 4°56′53″W		B	12928	Upload another image
Ballachulish Burial Ground Surrounding St John's Episcopal Church			56°40′42″N 5°09′21″W		B	6886	Upload another image
Ballachulish, East Laroch, The Old Stables			56°40′30″N 5°08′00″W		C(S)	6888	Upload Photo
Ballachulish Cnap An Tairbh, Loch Leven Slate Workers' Boat Houses			56°40′39″N 5°08′40″W		C(S)	48146	Upload Photo
Duror, Acharn Barn			56°38′35″N 5°15′55″W		B	13444	Upload Photo
Ballachulish Rudha Na Glas-Lice Loch Leven Slate Workers' Boat Houses			56°40′47″N 5°07′57″W		B	13307	Upload Photo
Kinlochleven Bridge On Wade Road (West Highland Way) By Village Water Supply Dam			56°41′56″N 4°56′53″W		B	12927	Upload Photo
Massacre of Glencoe Memorial, Glencoe Village			56°40′56″N 5°05′42″W		C(S)	6876	Upload another image See more images
Ballachulish, Episcopal Church Of St John			56°40′41″N 5°09′21″W		C(S)	6885	Upload another image See more images
Kinlochleven, Garbhein Road, Edenmhor			56°42′43″N 4°58′25″W		C(S)	46260	Upload Photo
Kinlochleven, Garbhein Road, Inverleven			56°42′44″N 4°58′18″W		C(S)	46262	Upload Photo
Etive Bridge On A82			56°39′06″N 4°51′08″W		B	13486	Upload another image See more images
Ballachulish, Bridge Of Laroch Over River Laroch			56°40′26″N 5°08′03″W		B	6883	Upload another image
Ballachulish, Church Of Scotland Church Of St Munda Brecklet			56°40′22″N 5°07′55″W		C(S)	6884	Upload Photo
Duror, Episcopal Church Of St Adamnan			56°38′55″N 5°16′19″W		C(S)	6891	Upload Photo
Glencoe Village, Episcopal Church Of St Mary And Former School Now Church Hall			56°40′58″N 5°06′08″W		C(S)	6871	Upload Photo
Duror, Church Of Scotland Parish Church And Burial Ground			56°38′47″N 5°16′26″W		B	6889	Upload another image
Glencoe Village, Glencoe And North Lorn Folk Museum			56°40′59″N 5°06′03″W		B	6872	Upload Photo
Glencoe Village, Glencoe Hospital			56°41′13″N 5°05′59″W		B	6873	Upload Photo
Duror, Kulmony Former Duror Parish Manse			56°38′45″N 5°16′23″W		C(S)	6890	Upload Photo
Kinlochleven, Garbhein Road, Tigh-Na-Bruaich			56°42′43″N 4°58′21″W		C(S)	46263	Upload Photo
Kinlochleven, Power House			56°42′47″N 4°57′29″W		A	49944	Upload Photo
Glencoe Village, Carnoch House (Carnoch Holiday And Outdoor Centre)			56°41′04″N 5°06′06″W		C(S)	6875	Upload Photo
By Kentallen, Lagnaha Farmhouse			56°39′22″N 5°15′34″W		C(S)	6879	Upload Photo
Achara House (By Duror)			56°38′18″N 5°16′56″W		B	6880	Upload Photo
Ballachulish Hotel And Garden Walls (At South Ballachulish)			56°41′15″N 5°11′04″W		B	6881	Upload Photo
Ballachulish, Former Episcopal Rectory			56°40′42″N 5°09′27″W		B	6887	Upload Photo

== Key ==
The scheme for classifying buildings in Scotland is:

- Category A: "buildings of national or international importance, either architectural or historic; or fine, little-altered examples of some particular period, style or building type."
- Category B: "buildings of regional or more than local importance; or major examples of some particular period, style or building type, which may have been altered."
- Category C: "buildings of local importance; lesser examples of any period, style, or building type, as originally constructed or moderately altered; and simple traditional buildings which group well with other listed buildings."

In March 2016 there were 47,288 listed buildings in Scotland. Of these, 8% were Category A, and 50% were Category B, with the remaining 42% being Category C.

== See also ==
- List of listed buildings in Highland
