= St Bride's Church, Onich =

19th-century church in Onich, Scotland

Coordinates: 56°42′01″N 5°11′00″W

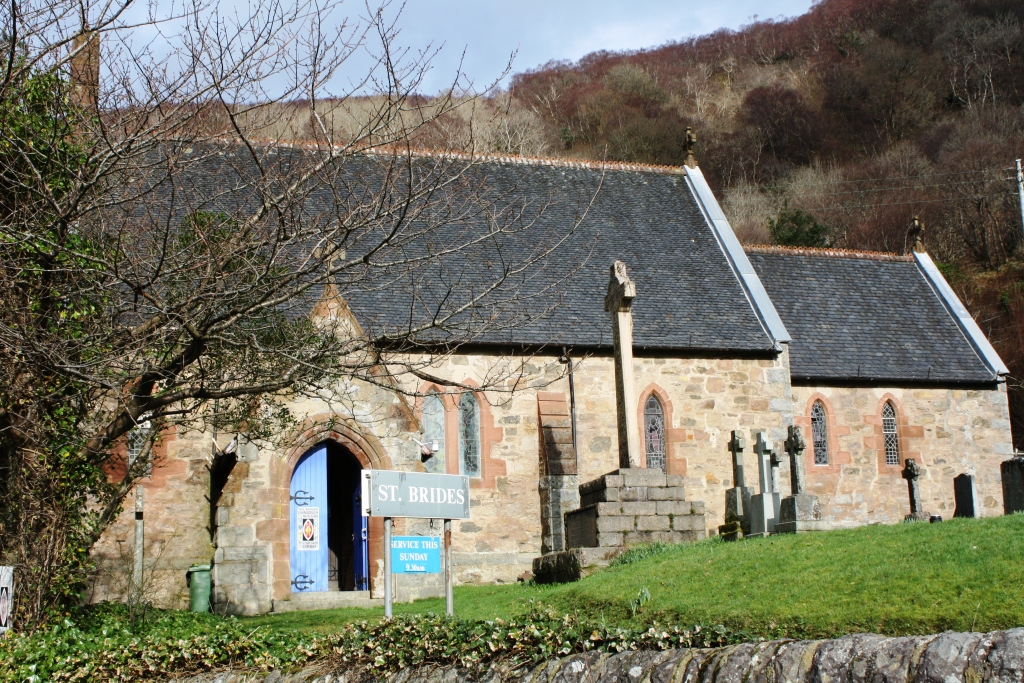
St Bride's Church

St Bride's Church is an Episcopal parish church in North Ballachulish in the Scottish Highlands. The church was built in 1874 and is notable for the Arts and Crafts movement inspired features of the church interior, including distinctive stained-glass windows, decorative floor tiles and a painted vestry screen.

== History ==
St Bride's Church was built in 1874 and was designed by architect John Garden Brown. Brown, who died at the age of 27, designed two churches before his death in 1880; his other church is Sacred Heart Catholic Church in Wigtown. There is a surviving window from the church when it was built, a stained-glass window by Clayton & Bell, 1875. A two-light depiction of the Annunciation by Shrigley and Hunt was added to the church in 1896. The church organ was originally installed on the chancel's north side. In 1898, the organ was moved to an organ loft at the west end of the church.

== Description ==
=== Church ===
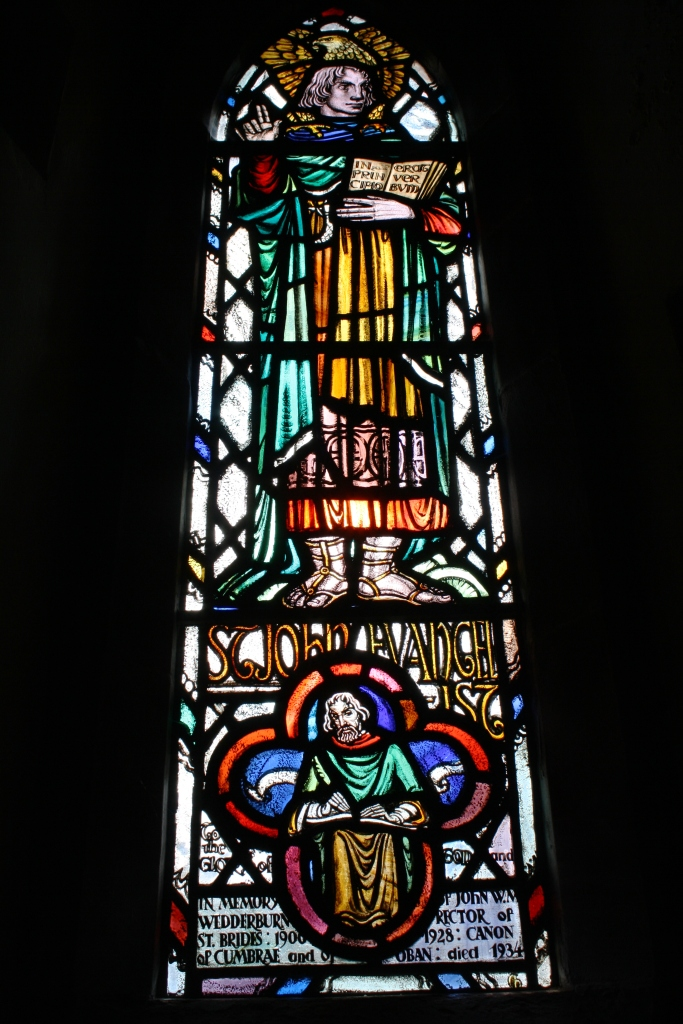
St John the Evangelist window

The church is located in North Ballachulish in the Highland region. The interior of the church contains several notable Arts and Crafts movement details: stained glass encaustic floor tiles a painted vestry screen and cusped panelling. The south window is a Pre-Raphaelite design of the Annunciation by Shrigley and Hunt. On the north wall is the Bishop Chinnery-Haldane (1840-1906) memorial windows depicting St Patrick, St Columba and St Bride. The east window shows "Our Lord coming again in Glory, surrounded by his holy angels. St Bride and St Columba stand below".

=== Burial ground ===
Near the church porch is a large, decorative stone cross commemorating Bishop Alexander Chinnery-Haldane (1842-1906), St Bride's first minister, and his wife Anna Elizabeth (1844-1907). Several small stone cross grave markers are scattered throughout the burial ground along with several wrought iron crosses. Iron cross burial monuments were popular during the late 19th century in England. Also buried here is Rev. David Railton (1884-1955), who originated the idea of the Unknown Warrior tomb in 1916 while serving as an army chaplain during World War I.

== See also ==
- St John's Church, Ballachulish
