= Bernard of Cluny =

12th-century Benedictine monk and satirist

Bernard of Cluny (or, of Morlaix or Morlay) was a twelfth-century French Benedictine monk, best known as the author of De contemptu mundi (On Contempt for the World), a long verse satire in Latin.

== Life ==
Bernard's family origins and place of birth are not known for certain. Some medieval sources list Morlaàs in Béarn, as his birthplace. However, in some records from that period he is called Morlanensis, which would indicate that he was a native of Morlaix in Brittany. James Westfall Thompson contended that Bernard belonged to the family of the seigneurs of Montpellier in Languedoc and was born at Murles. It is believed that Bernard was at first a monk of Saint-Sauveur d'Aniane and that he entered the monastery of Cluny during the administration of Abbot Pons (1109–1122).

== Works ==
Bernard is best known as the author of De contemptu mundi (On Contempt for the World), a 3,000 verse poem of stinging satire directed against the secular and religious failings he observed in the world around him. He spares no one; priests, nuns, bishops, monks, and even Rome itself are mercilessly scourged for their shortcomings. For this reason it was first printed by Matthias Flacius in Varia poemata de corrupto ecclesiae statu (Basle, 1557) as one of his testes veritatis, or witnesses of the deep-seated corruption of medieval society and of the Church, and was often reprinted by Protestants in the course of the seventeenth and eighteenth centuries.

Bernard of Cluny also wrote the twelfth century hymn "Omni die dic Mariae" (Daily, daily sing to Mary). Several of Bernard's sermons and a theological treatise, Dialogue (Colloquium) on the Trinity are extant, as is a c. 1140 poem which he dedicated to the monastery's abbot Peter the Venerable (1122–1156).

== Beatification process ==
On 19 March 1895, a cause for Bernard's beatification was formally opened, and he was given the title Servant of God.

=== Hymns ===
- Hic breve vivitur
- Hora novissima
- O hona patria
- Urbs Sion aurea

== Bibliography ==
- Bernardus Morlanensis, De contemptu mundi, Une vision du monde vers 1144 - Bernard le Clunisien. Latin text with French transl., introduction and commentary by André Cresson. (Témoins de notre histoire) Turnhout 2009.
- Bernardi Cluniacensis Carmina de Trinitate et de fide catholica (Studia Latina Stockholmiensia). Stockholm, 1963.
- Scorn for the world: Bernard of Cluny's De contemptu mundi. Latin text with engl. transl. and introd. by Ronald E. Pepin. Colleagues Press, East Lansing, Michigan, 1991.
- The Scorn of the World: A Poem in Three Books, transl. and ed. by Henry Preble and Samuel Macauley Jackson. The American Journal of Theology vol. 10,1 (1906), pp. 72–101 (prologus and book 1) online, vol. 10,2 (1906), S. 286–308 (book 2) online, vol. 10,3 (1906), S. 496–516 (book 3) online.
