= St John's Cathedral, Oban =

Cathedral of the Scottish Episcopal Church

Coordinates: 56°24′58″N 5°28′25″W

St John's Cathedral
- The Cathedral Church of Saint John the Divine
- Cathedral church of St John the Divine
- St John's Cathedral
- Location: Oban
- Country: Scotland
- Denomination: Scottish Episcopal Church
- Churchmanship: Broad Church
- Website: www.stjohnsoban.org.uk

History
- Dedication: St John the Divine
- Consecrated: 22 September 1864

Architecture
- Groundbreaking: 1846

Administration
- Diocese: Argyll and The Isles

Clergy
- Bishop: David Railton (bishop)

St John's Cathedral or the Cathedral Church of St John the Divine (Scottish Gaelic Ard-eaglais Eòin an Diadhair) is a cathedral of the Scottish Episcopal Church, located in the town of Oban. It is one of the two cathedrals of the Diocese of Argyll and The Isles, and one of the sees of the Bishop of Argyll and The Isles.

Interior view showing the unusual steel girders which support the central tower

The MacDougalls of Dunollie and Campbells of Dunstaffnage began the project to build an episcopal church in Oban in 1846. The first church was completed in 1864. The committee for the erection of the church appointed Charles Wilson as the architect, but following his death, the work was entrusted to his successor, David Thomson of the architectural practice Heath Wilson & David Thomson, Glasgow. As the Bishop of Argyll and The Isles Alexander Ewing was in Europe on account of his health, the church was consecrated by the Bishop of London Archibald Campbell Tait on Thursday 22 September 1864. It was described as being of small dimensions, consisting only of a nave and chancel, the total length being 61 feet (19 m) inside. The east window was filled with painted glass and donated by Sir Donald Campbell, 3rd Baronet of Dunstaffnage in memory of his brother Sir Angus. The rose window in the western gable was filled with painted glass, the gift of David Hutcheson. The contractors for the building were John McCorquodale for masonry, Andrew Fairgrieve for plumbing, Hugh Brown for slating, George McAlpine for plastering, Charles McLaren for glazing, R. Reguson & Sons for painting, and G. Smith & Co for ironwork. The cost of the first phase of the building was around £1,400 (equivalent to £153,800 in 2025).

In 1882 a side aisle was added to the south of the 1864 building. The 1910 additions were by architect James Chalmers of Glasgow. Funds ran out before construction finished – thus we are left with a unique cathedral (designated as such in 1920) with each phase clearly visible in the cathedral and the steel girders still supporting the incomplete vision of a grand structure.

A screen was added in 1958 designed by Ian Gordon Lindsay.

== List of rectors and provosts ==
- 1859-1880: Robert Jackson MacGeorge
- 1881-1896: Arthur Ingelby (formerly curate of Hawley, Hampshire)
- 1896-1930: Charles Pressley Smith
- 1930-1942: George Preston Tonge (formerly Rector of Christ Church, Falkirk)
- 1959–1979: Charles Copland (formerly Canon of St Mary's Episcopal Church, Arbroath)
- 1980-1986: Nigel Abbott (former Vicar of Holy Trinity Coventry)
- 1986-2000: Alan Maclean of Dochgarroch (formerly, Rector Dunoon)
- 2000–2012: Norman MacCallum
- 2012–2017: Nicki McNelly
- 2018–present: Margi Campbell

== See also ==
- Cathedral of The Isles – co-cathedral in Millport on the Isle of Cumbrae
- St Columba's Cathedral – Oban's Roman Catholic cathedral
