= Cathedral of The Isles =

Church on the Isle of Cumbrae, Scotland

Coordinates: 55°45′21″N 4°55′28″W

Cathedral of the Isles
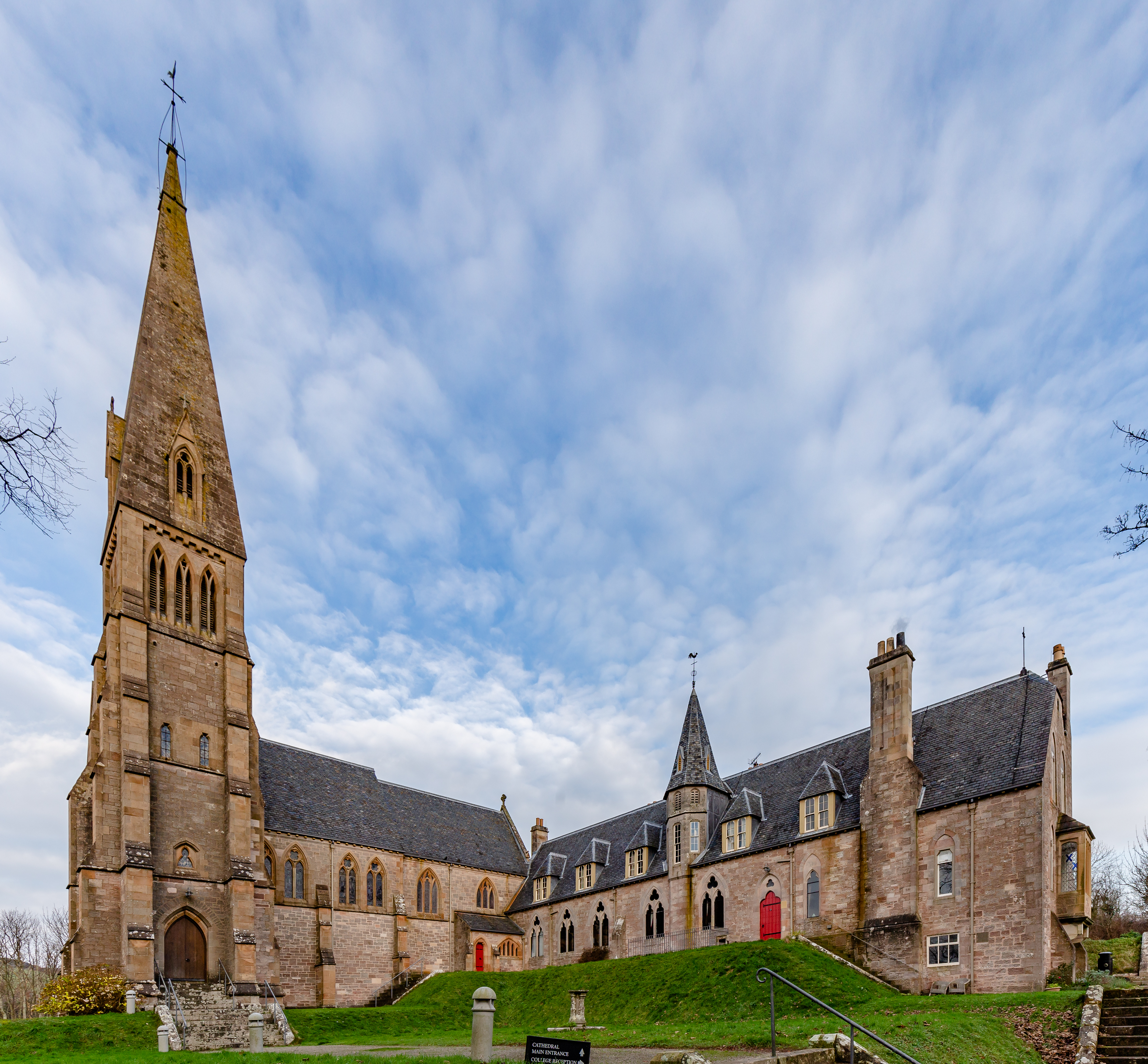
- Cathedral of the Isles, Cumbrae
- Cathedral of the Isles
- Denomination: Scottish Episcopal Church
- Churchmanship: Broad Church
- Website: Cathedral of the Isles

History
- Dedication: The Holy Spirit

Administration
- Diocese: Argyll & the Isles

The Cathedral of the Isles and Collegiate Church of the Holy Spirit is a Category A listed cathedral of the Scottish Episcopal Church in the town of Millport on the Isle of Cumbrae. It is one of the two cathedrals of the Diocese of Argyll and the Isles, the other being St John's Cathedral in Oban. From 2024 the office of Provost has been held by David Railton, Bishop of Argyll and The Isles.

== History ==
George Boyle, 6th Earl of Glasgow, was benefactor of the cathedral and the associated theological college and commissioned William Butterfield to design the building. Butterfield was one of the great architects of the Gothic Revival and also designed St Ninian's Cathedral in Perth. Construction finished in 1849 and the cathedral opened in 1851 as a collegiate church. The Chapel of the College of the Holy Spirit was raised to the status of a cathedral in 1876.

== Features ==
Formal gardens and woodland surround the cathedral, the tallest building on Great Cumbrae and the smallest cathedral in the British Isles. The tower dominates the buildings: at 123 feet (37 metres), the tower and spire are three times the length of the 40-foot (12-metre) nave.

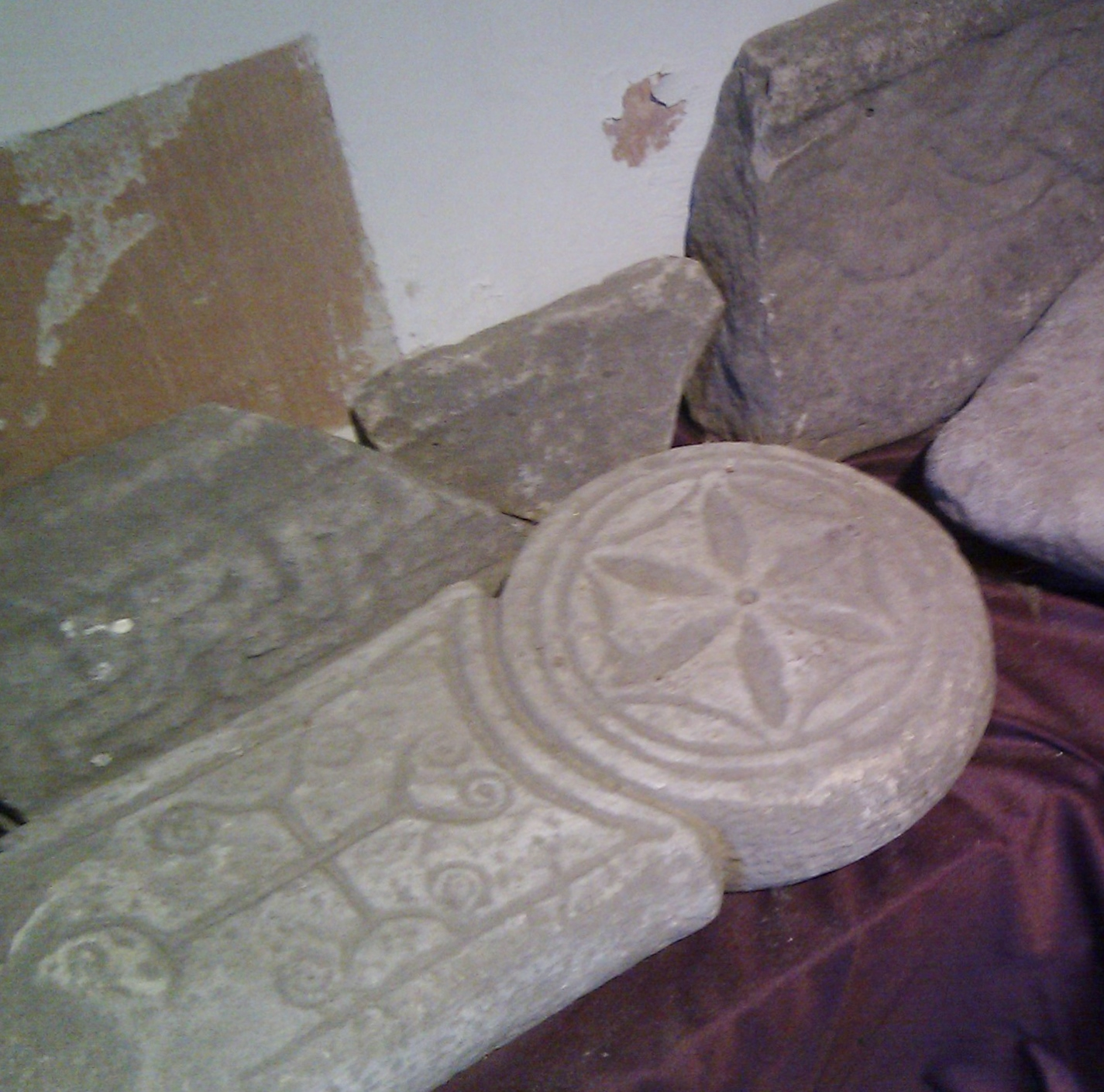
Celtic crosses at the Cathedral of the Isles.

In the entrance porch is an interesting collection of Celtic crosses, all of which were excavated on the island in Victorian times.

The stained glass is by William Wailes (west window) and Hardman & Co.

The organ was built by Philip Wood of Huddersfield. It was installed in 2004, having been relocated from Logie Pert Parish Church, replacing an organ by John Compton.

The organist is Alastair Chisholm, who was awarded a BEM in 2016 for services to music and culture.

== Theological college ==
The theological college existed for 34 years, starting in 1851. From 1919 to 1927 the college buildings housed nuns from the Community of St Andrew of Scotland (CSAS).

For ten years from 1975 it hosted the Community of Celebration Christian Trust.

The college is now a retreat house, the College of the Holy Spirit, and is open to the public to stay.

== Provosts ==
The Provosts are sometimes referred to as Provosts of the Cathedral of the Isles, and sometimes as Provosts of Cumbrae. Since Provost MacGregor, the Provost has been the Diocesan Bishop for the time being. (There is also an office of Dean of the United Diocese, which is separately held.) Incomplete list:

- Herbert Noyes (1875–1883), subsequently Dean of the United Diocese
- Alexander Chinnery-Haldane (1883–1891), concurrently Bishop of Argyll & the Isles (1883–1906)
- Thomas Ball (1892–1916), who died in office.
- Robert Taylor (1919–1926)
- Claude O'Flaherty (1926–1939)
- John Macarthur (1940–1949)
- George Douglas (1949–1973), who died in office.

After Fr Douglas, the office of Provost was held by the Bishop.

- Graham Pulkingham (1975–1980)
- Gregor MacGregor (1986–1987)
- Very Rev David McCubbin (1987 to 1994)

Thereafter the office of Provost has been held by the Bishop of Moray, Ross and Caithness.
