= Diocese of Argyll and The Isles (Episcopal) =

Anglican diocese of the Scottish Episcopal Church

Diocese of Argyll and The Isles Dioecesis Ergadiensis et Insularum Sgìre Easbaig Earra-Ghàidheal is nan Eilean

Location
- Country: Scotland
- Ecclesiastical province: Scotland

Statistics
- Congregations: 32

Information
- Denomination: Scottish Episcopal Church
- Cathedral: St John's Cathedral, Oban and the Cathedral of The Isles

Current leadership
- Bishop: David Railton

Map
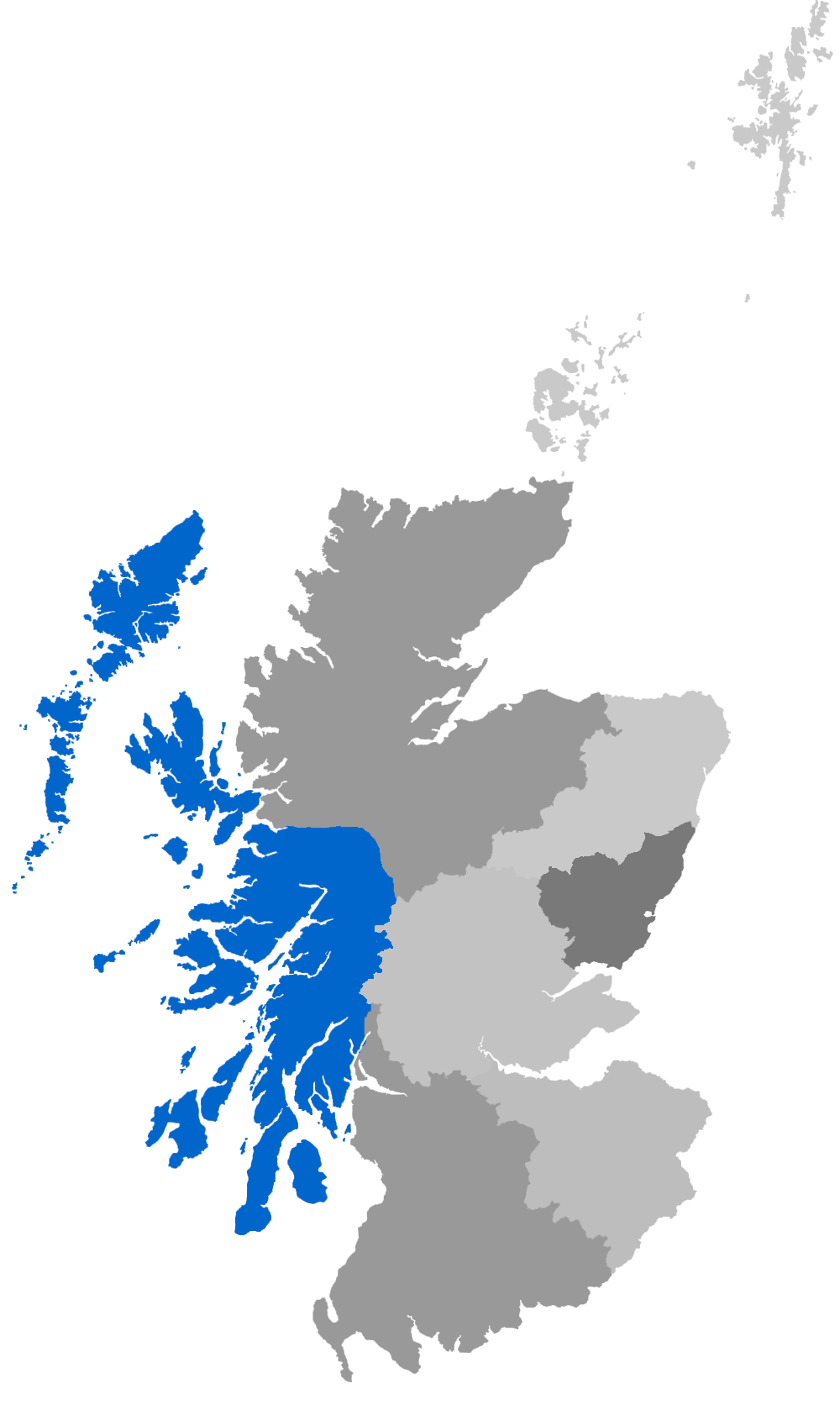
- Map showing Argyll & The Isles Diocese within Scotland

Website
- argyll.anglican.org

The Diocese of Argyll and The Isles is in the west of Scotland, and is one of the seven dioceses of the Scottish Episcopal Church. It is perhaps the largest of the dioceses, but has the smallest number of church members. As a united diocese, Argyll and The Isles has two cathedrals: St John's in Oban and the Cathedral of The Isles in Millport, Isle of Cumbrae.

The Diocese of the Isles, by itself, was founded by Patrick in 900, and the Diocese of Argyll was founded by Bishop Harald in 1193. During the Scottish Reformation, most of the heritage and jurisdiction of the church was given to the Church of Scotland. However, the small Scottish Episcopal Church has maintained the line of bishops of both dioceses through to the present day. In the seventeenth century, the Diocese of the Isles was united with the dioceses of Caithness and Orkney, and, in 1819, it was separated from them to unite with the Diocese of Argyll. In 1847, the Scottish Episcopal Diocese of Argyll and The Isles was officially established with Alexander Ewing as the first Bishop of Argyll and The Isles. In 1878, the Roman Catholic Church created their own Diocese of Argyll and the Isles. The diocese is responsible for the only two Episcopalian retreat houses in Scotland (Bishop's House, Iona and the College of the Holy Spirit at the Cathedral of The Isles). Keith Riglin, Vice Dean of King's College London, was elected by an Electoral Synod on 30 January 2021; his consecration was on 1 May 2021. Bishop Keith died on 24 September 2023 leaving the diocesan seat vacant until the election and installation of David Railton in 2024.

The Diocese of Argyll and The Isles is twinned with the Anglican Diocese of Zanzibar (Anglican Church of Tanzania) and the Episcopal Diocese of Delaware (Episcopal Church in the United States of America).

== Area and population ==
The diocese covers the historic counties of Argyllshire (population 60,000) and Buteshire (population 12,500), the Hebridean parts of Inverness-shire and Ross and Cromarty (population 38,000), and the Lochaber area of Inverness-shire (population 16,500). This total population of approximately 127,000 makes it the smallest British Anglican diocese by population apart from the Diocese of Sodor and Man. It gives the diocese a ratio of one priest to every 18,100 inhabitants and one church to every 3,850 inhabitants.

== Churches ==
The diocese currently has 8 stipendiary clergy (including the Bishop who is also the Provost of Cumbrae Cathedral) and 32 active churches.

Benefice/parish	Churches	Founded (building)	Stipendiary clergy
Lewis and Harris	St Peter, Stornoway	C18th (1838)	Jody Szoke
Lewis and Harris	St Moluag, Eoropaidh	1912 (Medieval)	Jody Szoke
Uist and Barra	St Brendan the Navigator, North Uist		Sue Newby
Skye and Raasay	St Columba, Portree	1884	Rosemary Bungard
Skye and Raasay	St Michael & All Angels, Raasay		Rosemary Bungard
Skye and Raasay	St Mary, Kilmore, Sleat		Rosemary Bungard
Kinlochmoidart with Strontian	St Finan, Kinlochmoidart	1858	Led by laypeople
Kinlochmoidart with Strontian	Strontian Congregation	No building	Led by laypeople
Fort William	St Andrew, Fort William	1817 (1880)	Vacant
Mull	St Columba, Gruline	1873	Led by laypeople
West Highland Region	St John, Ballachulish	1770 (1842)	Amanda Fairclough
West Highland Region	St Adamnan, Duror	C18th (1848)	Amanda Fairclough
West Highland Region	St Mary, Glencoe	C18th (1883)	Amanda Fairclough
West Highland Region	St Paul, Kinlochleven	1908 (1954)	Amanda Fairclough
West Highland Region	St Bride, Onich	1874	Amanda Fairclough
West Highland Region	Holy Cross (orig. St John), Portnacroish	1809	Amanda Fairclough
Iona	St Columba's Chapel, Bishop's House, Iona	1894	Joyce Watson (Chaplain)
Argyll Cathedral with Ardbrecknish & Kilbrandon	Cathedral of St John the Divine, Oban	1846 (1910)	Margi Campbell (Dean & Provost) Tom Ebbens (Curate, Ardbrecknish)
Argyll Cathedral with Ardbrecknish & Kilbrandon	Easdale, Seil and Luing Congregation	No building	Margi Campbell (Dean & Provost) Tom Ebbens (Curate, Ardbrecknish)
Argyll Cathedral with Ardbrecknish & Kilbrandon	St James, Ardbrecknish	1892	Margi Campbell (Dean & Provost) Tom Ebbens (Curate, Ardbrecknish)
Islay and Jura	St Columba, Bridgend, Islay	1888	Led by laypeople
Campbeltown	St Kiaran, Campbeltown	1848	Led by laypeople
Arran, Inveraray, Kilmartin and Lochgilphead	St Margaret of Scotland, Whiting Bay, Arran	1902	Simon Mackenzie
Arran, Inveraray, Kilmartin and Lochgilphead	All Saints, Inveraray	C19th (1886)	Simon Mackenzie
Arran, Inveraray, Kilmartin and Lochgilphead	St Columba, Poltalloch, Kilmartin	1854	Simon Mackenzie
Arran, Inveraray, Kilmartin and Lochgilphead	Christ Church, Lochgilphead	1842 (1851)	Simon Mackenzie
Dunoon, Rothesay, Kames, Tighnabruaich & West Cowal	Holy Trinity, Dunoon	1846 (1850)	David Rushton
Dunoon, Rothesay, Kames, Tighnabruaich & West Cowal	St Paul, Rothesay	c. 1830 (1854)	David Rushton
Isles Cathedral	Cathedral of the Holy Spirit, Cumbrae	1849	Alastair Chisholm (Lay Chaplain)

=== Former congregation ===
Benefice	Church	Founded (building)	Seceded from SEC
Harris, Isle of (Christ Church)	Christ Church, Harris	1973 (1999)	2018

On 24 November 2017 the congregation of Christ Church, Harris, a Scottish Episcopal church in the Outer Hebrides, announced that they could no longer remain under the oversight of their bishop, Kevin Pearson, owing to his support of the SEC's approval of same-sex marriage. They would instead be receiving the episcopal ministry of Andy Lines, the Missionary Bishop to Europe of the Anglican Church in North America. Daniel Davies, the priest-in-charge of Christ Church, resigned his SEC position on 22 January 2018.

=== Closed churches in the diocese area ===
Church	Building	Closed
St Columba, Tighnabruaich		c. 2011
Holy Spirit, Ardchattan	1886	2008
St Moluag, Kentallen	1868	pre-2015
St Mary, Strontian	1875	
Holy Cross, North Uist		
St Kilda, Lochbuie (Mull)	1876	

== See also ==
- Roman Catholic Diocese of Argyll and the Isles
