= Mackarness =

Mackarness is a surname, and may refer to:

- Charles Mackarness (1850–1918), English footballer and Archdeacon of the East Riding
- Frederick Coleridge Mackarness (1854–1920), British barrister, judge and politician
- George Mackarness (1822–1883), Anglican Bishop of Argyll and The Isles
- John Mackarness (1820–1889), Church of England Bishop of Oxford
- Matilda Anne Mackarness (1826–1881), English children's novelist

== See also ==
- Mackarness family tree, showing the relationship between the above.
