= Alexander Chinnery-Haldane =

Scottish bishop (1840–1906)

The Right Reverend Alexander Chinnery-Haldane
- Bishop of Argyll and The Isles
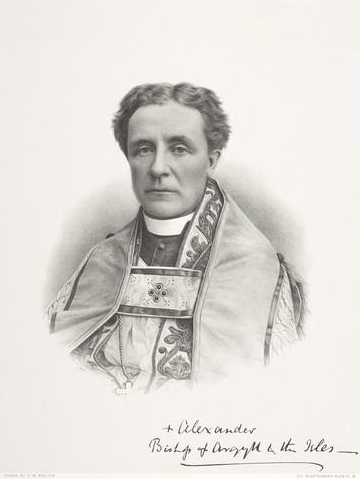
- Bishop Alexander Chinnery-Haldane
- Church: Scottish Episcopal Church
- Diocese: Argyll and The Isles
- In office: 1883–1906
- Predecessor: George Mackarness
- Successor: Kenneth Mackenzie
- Other post: Provost of Cumbrae
- Previous post: Dean of the Diocese of Argyll and The Isles

Orders
- Ordination: 1866 (deacon); 1867 (priest)
- Consecration: 24 August 1883 by Robert Eden

Personal details
- Born: James Robert Alexander Haldane; 14 August 1842 Hatcham, Surrey, England
- Died: 16 February 1906 (aged 63) Nether Lochaber, Scotland
- Denomination: Anglican
- Parents: Alexander Haldane and Emma Hardcastle
- Spouse: Anna Elizabeth Chinnery
- Education: Bury St Edmunds Grammar School; Trinity College, Cambridge

James Robert Alexander Chinnery-Haldane (né Haldane, sometime Haldane-Chinnery; 14 August 1840 – 16 February 1906) was an Anglican bishop in the last decades of the 19th century and the first decade of the 20th century.

== Early life ==
He was born in Hatcham, Surrey, the son of the barrister and newspaper proprietor Alexander Haldane (son of Scottish cleric James Haldane) and Emma Hardcastle. His early education was at Bury St Edmunds Grammar School, Suffolk. He entered Trinity College, Cambridge on 26 August 1861 and graduated with a Bachelor of Laws (1865); later graduating with a Master of Laws (1885) and Doctor of Divinity (1889). He was admitted to the Inner Temple on 5 May 1864. He assumed the additional surname of Chinnery on 29 July 1864 (becoming Haldane-Chinnery) just before his marriage on 23 August 1864 to Anna Elizabeth Chinnery (died 30 November 1907), only daughter of the Reverend Sir Nicholas Chinnery, Baronet of Flintfield, County Cork. He changed his name again by Royal Licence on 2 September 1878 to Chinnery-Haldane.

== Anglican ministry ==
He was made deacon in 1866 and began his Anglican ministry as a curate at Calne, Wiltshire (1866–1869), during which time he was ordained priest on Trinity Sunday 1867 (16 June) by Walter Kerr Hamilton, Bishop of Salisbury, at Salisbury Cathedral — on that occasion his name was gazetted James Robert Alexander Hardcastle Haldane-Chinnery (i.e. with his mother's maiden name as an extra middle-name). He moved to Scotland where served as a curate at All Saints, Edinburgh (1869–1876). His next pastoral appointment was a curate at Ballachulish, with charge of Nether Lochaber (1876–1879). (Late during this charge his surname changed from Haldane-Chinnery to Chinnery-Haldane.) Afterwards, becoming the incumbent at Ballachulish (with Glencoe) (1879–1885), and Incumbent at Nether Lochaber (1879–1895). He also became Dean of the Diocese of Argyll and The Isles (1881–1883).

He was unanimously elected Bishop of Argyll and The Isles at a Synod on Cumbrae, 13 June 1883; and then consecrated a bishop at Fort William on 24 August 1883 by Robert Eden, Primus of the Scottish Episcopal Church, with bishops Cotterill, Wilson, Jermyn, Lightfoot, and Kelly as co-consecrators. He also served as Provost of Cumbrae (1886–1891).

Chinnery-Haldane died in office at Alltshellach House, Nether Lochaber on 16 February 1906, aged 63.

== See also ==
- Ballachulish figure

== Bibliography ==
- Bertie, David M. (2000). Scottish Episcopal Clergy, 1689-2000. Edinburgh: T & T Clark. ISBN 0567087468.

Scottish Episcopal Church titles
Preceded by Robert Jackson MacGeorge	Dean of Argyll and The Isles; 1881–1883	Succeeded by Frederick Robert Halsey Herbert Noyes
Preceded by George Mackarness	Bishop of Argyll and The Isles; 1883–1906	Succeeded by Kenneth Mackenzie
