= Matilda Anne Mackarness =

English novelist (1825–1881)

- Born: Matilda Anne Planché; 23 November 1825; London, England
- Died: 6 May 1881 (aged 55); Margate, England
- Occupation: Novelist
- Spouse: Henry S. Mackarness (m. 1852; died 1868)

Matilda Anne Mackarness (née Planché; 1826 – 6 May 1881) was an English novelist of the 19th century, primarily writing children's literature.

== Life and career ==
Matilda Anne Mackarness was born Matilda Anne Planché in 1826 as the younger daughter of James Robinson Planché and Elizabeth St. George. From an early age, Matilda wrote and had musical talent. As a novelist, she took Dickens for her model and in 1845, she published her first work, Old Joliffe, a satire of Dickens' 1844 Christmas story The Chimes. The following year, Matilda published A Sequel to Old Joliffe. In 1849, she published the bestseller A Trap to Catch a Sunbeam. The work was so popular that in future works, she is sometimes credited only as "the Author of 'A Trap to Catch a Sunbeam." It was composed some three years before the date of publication, had gone through forty-two editions by 1882, and has been translated into many foreign languages, including Hindustani.

On December 21, 1852, Matilda married the Rev. Henry S. Mackarness at Holy Trinity Church, Brompton. Henry was the brother of John Fielder Mackarness, bishop of Oxford, and of George R. Mackarness, bishop of Argyll and the Isles. After the wedding, the couple settled at Dymchurch near Hythe, where Henry ran a parish. Soon after, Matilda and Henry moved to Ash-next-Sandwich, Kent, where Mackarness was vicar. Matilda and Henry had 11 children together, 4 of whom died in infancy. Henry died on December 26, 1868. Widowed, Matilda was left in poverty with seven children and afterwards lived with her father at Chelsea and then Clapham. She became ill, continued writing, and died on May 6, 1881 at Margate. Matilda was buried next to her husband.

Mackarness's granddaughter Ursula St. George was a child actress in the United States from 1911-1912 and an art collector later in life. Ursula St. George's grandson, Eric Brodnax, was a member of the U. S. Virgin Islands equestrian team at the 1988 Summer Olympics in Seoul.

== Reception ==
The Athenaeum wrote, "There are few writers since Miss Edgeworth's time who have been as successful as Mrs. Mackarness in pointing out the value of domestic virtues."

== Works ==
- Only (1849), republished in America in 1950
- A Merry Christmas (originally published in an Edinburgh periodical, and then in 1865, Lockwood and Co.)
- The Dream Chintz (1851, James Munroe and Company)
- The Cloud with the Silver Lining (1852, Shakespeare Press)
- The House on the Rock (1852, James Munroe and Company)
- Influence, or the Evil Genius (1853, George Routledge and Sons)
- The Star in the Desert (1853, Shakespeare Press)
- Thrift, Hints for Cottage Housekeeping (1855)
- Sibert's Wold: A Tale (1856, James Munroe and Company)
- A Ray of Light (1857, Robert Carter & Brothers)
- Coming Home (1858, James Munroe and Company)
- The Golden Rule: or Stories Illustrative of The Ten Commandments (1859, George Routledge and Sons)
- Amy's Kitchen (1860, Lockwood and Co.)
- Minnie's Love (1860, Lockwood and Co.)
- When we were Young and other Stories (1860)
- Little Sunshine (1861)
- Coraline, or After many Days (1862)
- A Guardian Angel (1864, Hurst and Blackett), published in 2 volumes
- The Naughty Girl of the Family (1865, George Routledge and Sons)
- Charades (1866)
- The Village Idol (1866, George Routledge and Sons)
- Example Better Than Precept (1867)
- Climbing the Hill (1868, Frederick Warne & Co.)
- Granny's Spectacles (1869, Cassell, Petter, and Galpin)
- Married and Settled (1870)
- The Children's Sunday Album of Short Stories for Sunday Reading (1870, Cassell, Petter, Galpin & Company)
- Old Saws New Set (1871)
- A Peerless Wife (1871, Richard Bentley), published in 3 volumes
- A Mingled Yarn (1872, Richard Bentley), published in 3 volumes
- Marion Lee's Good Work (1873)
- Sweet Flowers (1873, George Routledge and Sons)
- Children of the Olden Time (1874, Griffith and Farran)
- Tell Mamma (1874)
- Wild Rose and other Tales (1874)
- Snowdrop and other Tales (1874)
- Only a Little Primrose (1874)
- Rosebud Tales (1874)
- Pearls Re-Strung: Stories from the Apocrypha (1878, J. Masters and Co.)
- Only a Penny; a Moral Tale for Children (1878)
- Dawn of the Morning (1879)
- Only a Dog (1879)
- A Woman without a Head (1892, published from a manuscript which had been lost for 12 years)

Matilda also contributed to the Magnet Stories (1860–1862), wrote a collection of Ballad Stories for the Girl's Own Paper, edited The Young Lady's Book (1876), and edited and wrote stories for Lights and Shadows (1879). Some of her works were republished as collections called the Sunbeam Series.
