= Harold McDonell =

English cricketer and educator

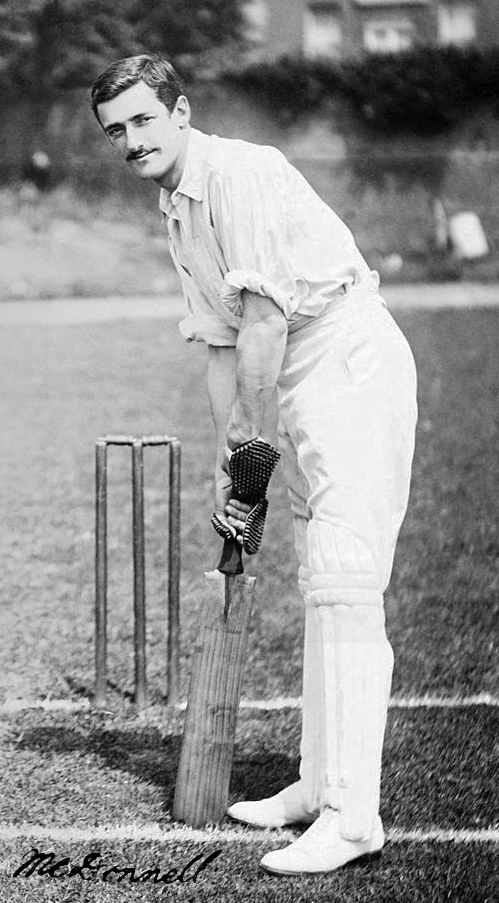
- McDonell c. 1912

Personal information
- Full name: Harold Clark McDonell
- Born: 19 September 1882; Wimbledon, Surrey, England
- Died: 23 July 1965 (aged 82); Onich, Inverness-shire, Scotland
- Batting: Right-handed
- Bowling: Leg break

Domestic team information
- Years: Team
- 1901–1904: Surrey
- 1902–1905: Cambridge University
- 1905: Marylebone Cricket Club
- 1908–1921: Hampshire

Career statistics
Competition	First-class
Matches	129
Runs scored	3,005
Batting average	15.73
100s/50s	0/9
Top score	78
Balls bowled	16,006
Wickets	443
Bowling average	21.91
5 wickets in innings	22
10 wickets in match	3
Best bowling	8/83
Catches/stumpings	124/–
- Source: Cricinfo, 27 February 2010

Harold Clark McDonell (19 September 1882 – 23 July 1965) was an English first-class cricketer and educator. As a cricketer, he played county cricket for both Surrey and Hampshire, and varsity cricket for Cambridge University. In nearly 130 first-class appearances, he took nearly 450 wickets with his leg spin bowling, in addition to scoring over 3,000 runs. As an educator, McDonnell began his teaching career at Twyford School, where he had attended in his youth. From 1910 to 1937, he was headmaster of the school.

== Education and early cricket career ==
The son of A. W. McDonell, he was born at Wimbledon in September 1882. He was educated firstly at Twyford School, a boys' preparatory school three miles south of Winchester, before attending Winchester College, where he played for and captained the college cricket team. In the summer following his final year at Winchester, McDonell made his debut in first-class cricket for Surrey against Hampshire at Southampton in the 1901 County Championship. After completing his education at Winchester, McDonell matriculated to Corpus Christi College, Cambridge. There, he played first-class cricket for Cambridge University Cricket Club between 1902 and 1905, making 31 appearances. Amongst these were three appearances in The University Match against Oxford University at Lord's, which gained him a blue. An all-rounder who bowled leg spin, he took 117 wickets for Cambridge at an average of 20.15; he took eight five wicket hauls and ten-wickets in a match once. his best innings bowling figures were 8 for 83 against Surrey, when he took match figures of 15 for 138. McDonell topped the Cambridge bowling averages in both his first and last years. With the bat, he scored 898 runs at a batting average of 16.62, with three half centuries and a highest score of 78. A notable batting innings for Cambridge came in 1905, when with Cambridge destined to lose the match when they lost six quick wickets, McDonell (60) combined with Toby Colbeck (107) to add 143 runs in just under ninety minutes, setting up a Cambridge victory.

During the summer-break in 1903 and 1904, McDonell played for Surrey, making twelve further first-class appearances for the county during that period. In thirteen matches for Surrey, he took 41 wickets at an average of 21.75; he took two five wicket hauls and took ten wickets in a match once, with best innings figures of 7 for 44 against Gloucestershire. He headed Surrey's bowling averages during the 1903 season. With the bat, he scored 269 runs at a batting average of 14.15, with a highest score of 46. In 1903 and 1904, he made two appearances for the Gentlemen in the Gentlemen v Players match, in addition to playing once for the Gentlemen of England in 1905 against the touring Australians. Shortly after his matriculation from Cambridge in 1905, he toured North America with the Marylebone Cricket Club, playing two first-class matches against the Gentlemen of Philadelphia. McDonell bowled with success in the second match at Merion Cricket Club, with match figures of 9 for 130.

== Teaching career and Hampshire cricket ==
Over the next three year, McDonell did not play first-class cricket. This was likely due to his appointment as an assistant-master at Twyford School. He returned to first-class cricket with Hampshire in 1908, playing four times in that seasons County Championship. Due to his teaching commitments, he was only able to appear for Hampshire after July. He often featured in at least ten first-class matches after July, playing for Hampshire both prior to and after the First World War. In all, he made 78 first-class appearances for Hampshire, with his final match coming in 1921. In these, he took 263 wickets at an average of 22.43; he took eleven five wicket hauls and took ten wickets in a match once, with best innings figures of 7 for 47 against Somerset at Southampton in the 1914 County Championship. With the bat, he scored 1,747 runs at a batting average of 16.17, with six half centuries and a highest score of 76. During the period in which he played for Hampshire, he also played first-class cricket once each for the Gentlemen of the South (1909) and Plum Warner's personal team (1920).

In McDonell's overall first-class career, he took 443 wickets at an average of 21.91, taking 22 five wicket hauls and ten wickets in a match on three occasions. With the bat, he scored 3,005 runs at a batting average of 15.73, with nine half centuries. A capable fielder, he took 124 catches, and was described by Wisden as a "splendid fielder". John Arlott later described him as "the keenest of cricketers". Plum Warner considered him an "invaluable all-round man" for Hampshire.

From 1910 to 1937, McDonell was headmaster of Twyford School. During his headmastership, he oversaw the levelling of the grounds to make a new football pitch and the installation of a covered swimming pool. In 1923, the Memorial Library was opened, which is still in use as of 2026. He was known for his dislike of anything modern or scientific; he refused to install gas lighting and would only have electricity in certain parts of the school. His austerity caused was noted as a cause of the decline in pupil numbers to 37 under his headmastership. A year after the end of his headmastership, he married his cousin Muriel Nightingale, née Phillips (1898-1975). McDonell died in Scotland at Onich in Inverness-shire in July 1965.
