= Ursula St. George =

American actress (1895–1979)

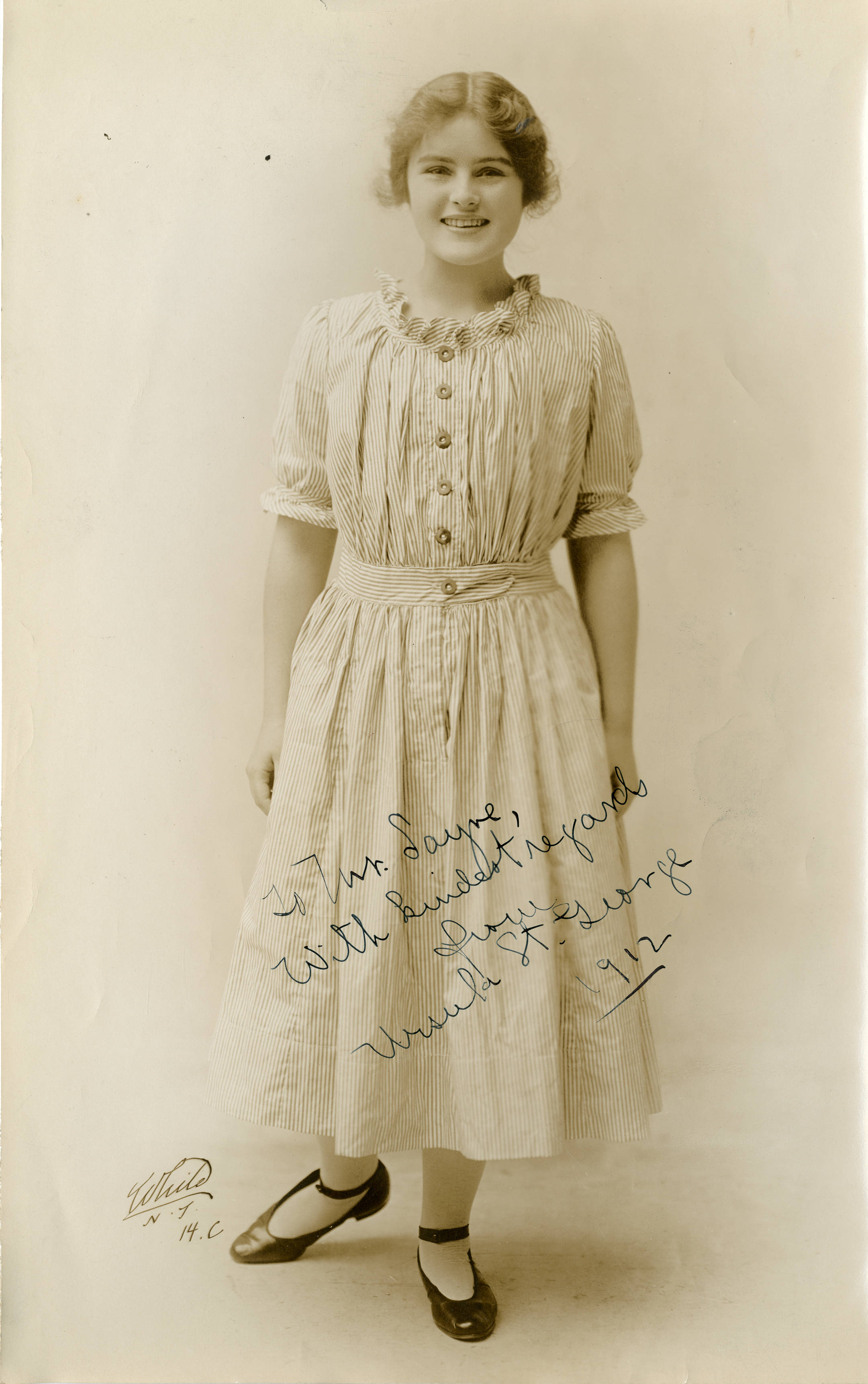
- Ursula St. George, in an autographed photo from 1912.
- Born: Ursula Edith Kate Mackarness; October 22, 1895; Staten Island, New York, US
- Died: May 1979 (aged 83); Chichester, West Sussex, England
- Occupations: Actress, art collector
- Spouse: Anders Eric Knös Cull (d. 1968)
- Relatives: James Planché (great-grandfather); Matilda Anne Mackarness (grandmother); George Bellew (son-in-law)

Ursula Edith Kate Mackarness Cull (October 22, 1895 – May 1979); known professionally as Ursula St. George, was an American actress as a teenager. Later in life, known as U. E. K. Cull, she collected art and ancient Chinese artifacts with her banker husband in London.

== Early life ==
Ursula Edith Kate Mackarness was born on Staten Island. Her English-born father Charles Mackarness was a grandson of dramatist James Planché and son of novelist Matilda Anne Mackarness; he was a magazine editor, sculptor, and dog breeder. Her mother was an actress, and toured with young Ursula as a chaperone.

== Career ==
St. George appeared in The Blue Bird (1911), and was best known in the title role in Rebecca of Sunnybrook Farm, which she performed across the United States and Canada in a Klaw and Erlanger production, 1911 and 1912. She was sixteen years old for much of the run of the show. "Miss St. George holds her audience in the delicious spell of her girlishness and ingenuous beauty," raved a Texas critic.

She and her husband were art collectors, and had a particularly valuable collection of ancient Chinese artifacts. In 1927, Australian artist James Peter Quinn painted her portrait. In 1972, she donated a pair of ancient Chinese bronze vessels to the British Museum, with enough money to build a case for them. Other Cull collection items were auctioned by Sotheby's in the 1960s, and she sold seven paintings by James Peter Quinn in 1975. Further objects from their collection were bequeathed to the British Museum in 1979.

== Personal life ==
Ursula Mackarness married London banker Anders Eric Knos Cull in 1913, in London. They had six children and lived at Warfield House in Bracknell, Berkshire. Their eldest daughter, Ursula Kennard Cull, was married to Sir George Rothe Bellew, Garter Principal King of Arms. The Culls' grandson Eric Brodnax was a member of the equestrian team representing the U.S. Virgin Islands at the 1988 Summer Olympics in Seoul.

Ursula Mackarness Cull was widowed in 1968, and died in May, 1979.
