= Cuil Bay =

Coastal embayment within the council area of Lochaber in Scotland

- Bàgh na Cùile (Scottish Gaelic)
- The bay from the lower slopes of Ardsheal Hill

- Location within Argyll and Bute
- Location: Duror, Argyll and Bute Scotland
- Coordinates: 56°38′41.3160″N 5°18′31.0428″W
- River sources: River Duror; Salachan Burn
- Ocean/sea sources: Loch Linnhe
- Basin countries: Scotland
- Max. length: 2.67 km (1.66 mi)
- Max. width: 1.77 km (1.10 mi)
- Average depth: 32 m (105 ft)
- Islands: Eilean Balnagowan, Shuna
- Settlements: Duror, Keil, Achara, Cuil

Cuil Bay (Scottish Gaelic: Bàgh na Cùile), meaning recess, corner, niche or nook, is a 237° facing, large sand and shingle coastal embayment with a semi-circular outline, on a chord of 2 km, situated on the south‐west part of the Ardsheal peninsula, on the southern coast of the sea loch of Loch Linnhe, in the parish of Lismore and Appin, within the council area of Lochaber in Scotland. It was formerly part of Argyll and Bute before boundary changes occurred. The bay is situated adjacent to the village of Duror. The bay is reached by a small road that leads from the Duror Primary School, leaving the main A828 road, following the line of the River Duror, as it races to meet the sea, before opening out into a vista of a long shore of meadows and sea-grasses as the land meets the bay proper.

== Geography ==
The bay, which has an orientation of south-east to north-west, bounded to the north by Ardsheal peninsula which has the same orientation, faces Loch Linnhe in a southeasterly direction, with the full width of Loch Linnhe partially obscured by Ardsheal peninsula, where the bay is located, on its westerly edge. The small island of Eilean Balnagowan can be plainly seen from the bay, at a distance of 2 km, behind the island, lies Shuna Island at 7.42 km from the shingle beach, which can clearly be seen on the left of hand side of Eilean Balnagowan, with the Sound of Shuna, that separates the island from Appin coast clearly visible. Around 13.71 km from the bay, that be seen from the north end of Cuil Bay on a clear day, is the north coast of the garden island of Lismore, which is oriented from south-west to north-east, following the orientation of Loch Linnhe, roughly parallel to the Great Glen Fault.

Cuil Bay is part of the ancient district of Lorne.

== Salmon Fishing ==
A Salmon fishing station using the ancient set bag net style of fishing is located close to the Rubha Beag headland at the north west end of the bay. There is evidence that Salmon fishing has occurred in Cuil Bay for some 400 years, which is important for Scotland heritage. The main species of Salmon fished is the Salmo salar. The fishing technique uses a fixed engine bag, which is a trap for fish, where a leader runs into two or three other chambers, where the fish are trapped. This is both an ancient and environmentally healthy way to fish, as fish can be kept or released depending on size, weight and condition. Langoustine and prawn are also fished by pot in the same spot.

== Biology ==
Cuil Bay is known for providing the ideal biology for the giant tachinid fly which resembles a bumblebee in flight. A large amount of dry, open meadows and heaths that surround the bay make for ideal breeding grounds. It breeds from February until September and is a parasite of large caterpillars.

=== Conservation designations ===
Cuil Bay is part of one Special Protection Area, and one Site of Special Scientific Interest. The first is biological in nature, the second is geological:

- Special Protected Area: Glen Etive and Glen Fyne. Designated 28 October 2010 for internationally important aggregations of breeding birds - golden eagle (Aquila chrysaetos)
- Site of Special Scientific Interest: Ardsheal Peninsula. Designated 1 February 1981 for igneous petrology (Caledonian Igneous) and structural and metamorphic geology (Dalradian).

== Features ==
=== Dewar Manuscripts ===
It is mentioned in The Dewar Manuscripts, in one of the stories, that the Lord of the Isles had a hospitality house, located in Cuill, although the present location is not known. The tenant of the house paid no rent on the condition that if the Lord of the Isles visited, a feast would be laid on and the Lord would be entertained. The tenant of the hospitality house, one McTavish was told to prepare a feast, but the River Etive was in spate, so the Lord was delayed. Dugald MacIain Stewart of the Clan Stewart of Appin told McTavish that the visit would not take place, and that he and his close friends would eat the feast. When the Lord turned up a few days later, no feast was prepared, but Stewart had prepared a new feast, which was to be eaten between Kentallen Bay and Lettermore Wood. As a reward, he was given Cuil. The Lord of the Isles stated of the affair:

O! Big gluttonous MacTavish, Whose ways are filthy; Though I have taken from you Cuil Dear, do not harm yourself.

== Achara Stone ==
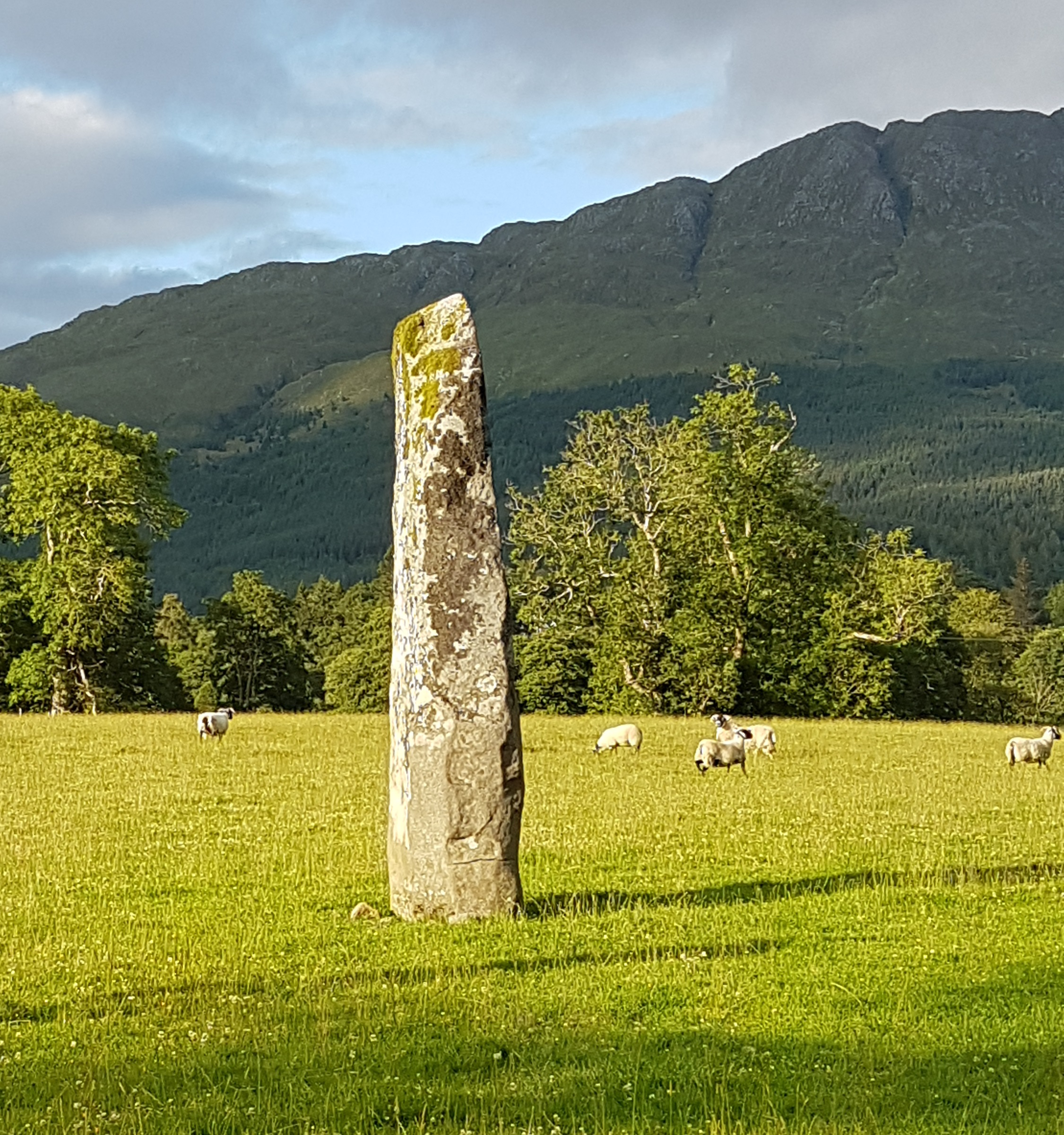
The ancient Achara Stone. The menhir measures 3.7 metres (12 ft) in height and1.1 metres (3 ft 7 in) by 0.6 metres (2 ft 0 in)metres at the base.

Close to the start of the small road which leads to Cuil bay from Duror Primary School, between Duror and township of Achara (Scottish Gaelic: Achadh a' charraigh), opposite the primary school, within a field, is an ancient single standing stone, that has been there for least 5000 years. The stone is 12 feet high, and gave its name to the Achara area.

== Gallery ==
Winters dawm

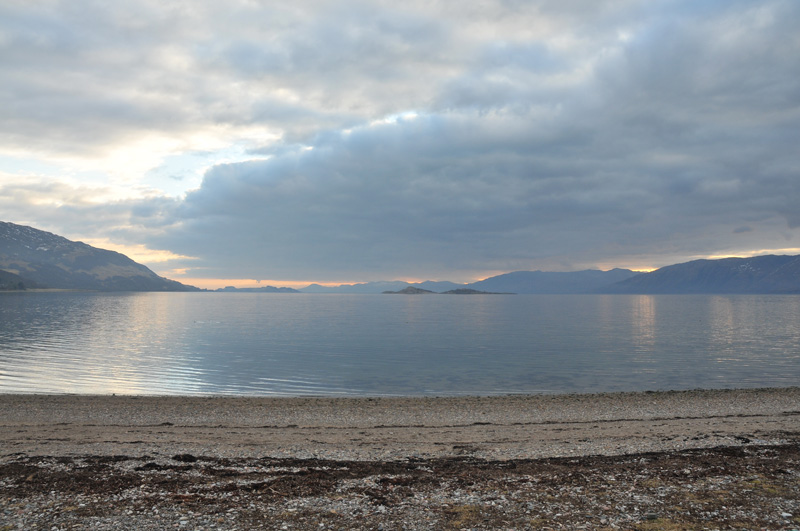
Cuil Bay looking towards Shuna and Lismore.

Cuil Bay looking towards the Salmon fishing station and the hills of Ardgour in the distance.

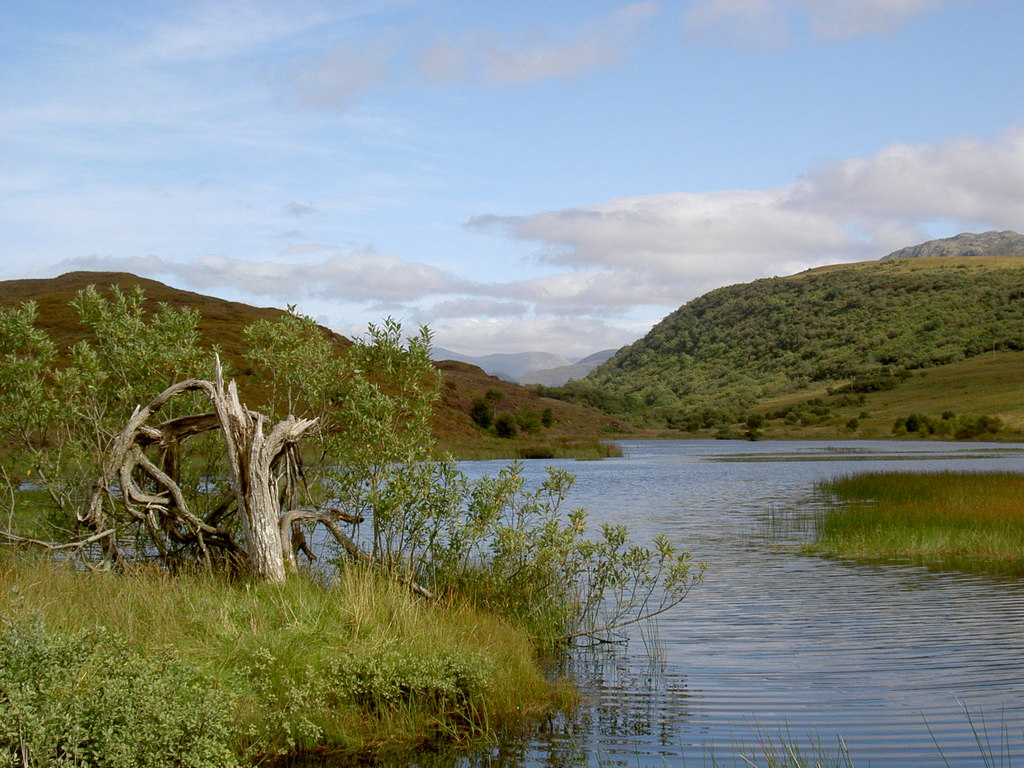
A small fresh lochan above Cuil Bay supporting Mute Swan and a few ducks.

Looking towards the bay from the south
