= Appin =

Coordinates: 56.562222°N 5.358889°W

Appin: Scottish Gaelic: An Apainn
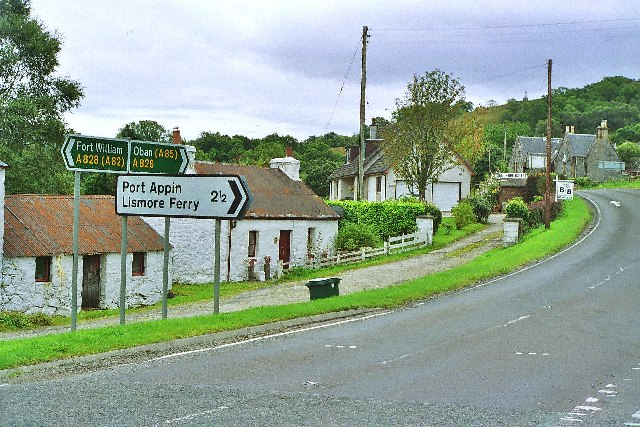
- Appin village, at the seaward end of the Strath of Appin

- Location within Argyll and Bute
  - Edinburgh: 133 miles
  - London: 510 miles
- Council area: Argyll and Bute
- Country: Scotland
- Sovereign state: United Kingdom
- Post town: Appin
- Postcode district: PA38
- Police: Scotland
- Fire: Scottish
- Ambulance: Scottish
- UK Parliament: Argyll, Bute and South Lochaber
- Scottish Parliament: Argyll and Bute

Appin (Scottish Gaelic: An Apainn) is a coastal district of the Scottish West Highlands bounded to the west by Loch Linnhe, to the south by Loch Creran, to the east by the districts of Benderloch and Lorne, and to the north by Loch Leven. It lies northeast to southwest, and measures 23 by 11 kilometres (14 by 7 miles). The name, meaning "abbey land", in reference to Lismore Abbey, is derived from the Middle Irish apdaine.

The district is mainly in Argyll and Bute, with a coastal strip to the north, along Loch Leven, within the Highland council area.

The scenery of the district is a combination of seascapes with rugged and mountainous country inland. Appin forms part of the Lynn of Lorn National Scenic Area, one of 40 in Scotland. The principal hills are double peaks of Beinn a' Bheithir – 1,025 and 1,001 m (3,362 and 3,284 ft), respectively – and Creag Ghorm – 723 m (2,372 ft) – in the north, and Fraochaidh 879 m (2,883 ft), Meall Bàn 655 m (2,148 ft) and Beinn Mhic na Cèisich 638 m (2,093 ft) near the western flank of Glen Creran. The chief rivers are the Coe and Laroch, flowing into Loch Leven, the Duror and Salachan flowing into Loch Linnhe, and the Iola and Creran flowing into Loch Creran.

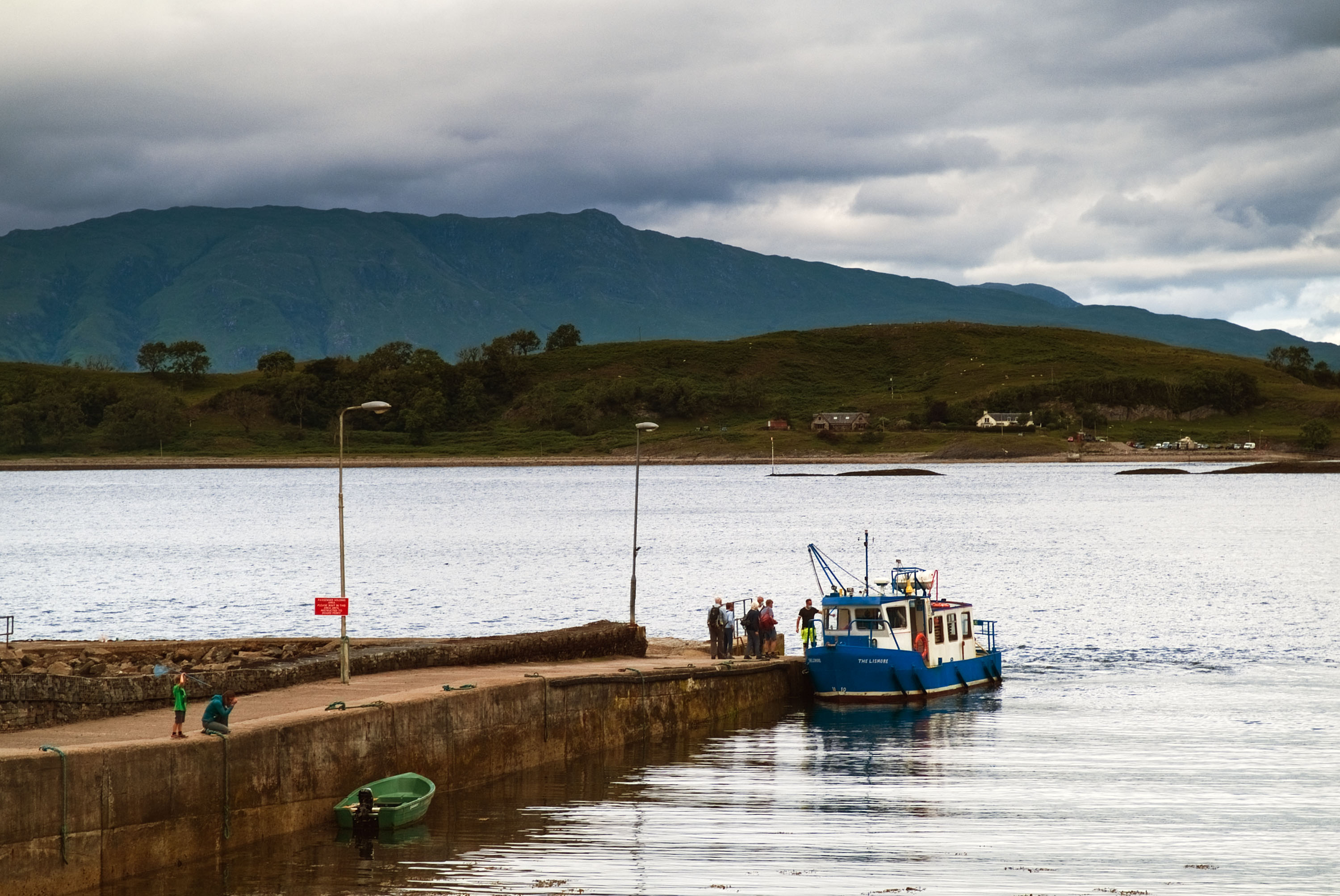
The ferry to Lismore at Port Appin

The leading industries are forestry and tourism, with lead mining and slate quarrying being of former importance, but the Glensanda superquarry, in Morvern on the opposite bank of Loch Linnhe also provides local employment. Ballachulish, Duror, Portnacroish, Appin Village and Port Appin are the principal villages.

The A828 road runs along the coast of Appin. A passenger-only ferry to the island of Lismore runs from Port Appin. The district formerly had a railway, but the Caledonian Railway company's branch line from Connel to Ballachulish was closed in 1966.

Appin was the country of a distinct local branch of Clan Stewart. It is where the Appin Murder took place in 1752.

== Coastal rowing ==
In 2015, a group of local people came together to form Appin Community Skiff, subsequently leasing the Port Appin boathouse where they built a St. Ayles skiff from a kit. The boat was launched in February 2022. The community now has a thriving coastal rowing club which has acquired a second boat.

== Notable residents ==
- Elizabeth Macquarie (née Campbell), wife of the fifth governor of New South Wales, was born in the area. During his term the governor named the towns of Appin and Airds after his wife's birthplace and her family's estate respectively. The Female Orphan School in Parramatta is said to have been modelled on the estate's main house.
