= Glenachulish =

Hamlet in Lochaber, Highland, Scotland

Coordinates: 56°40′52″N 5°11′21″W

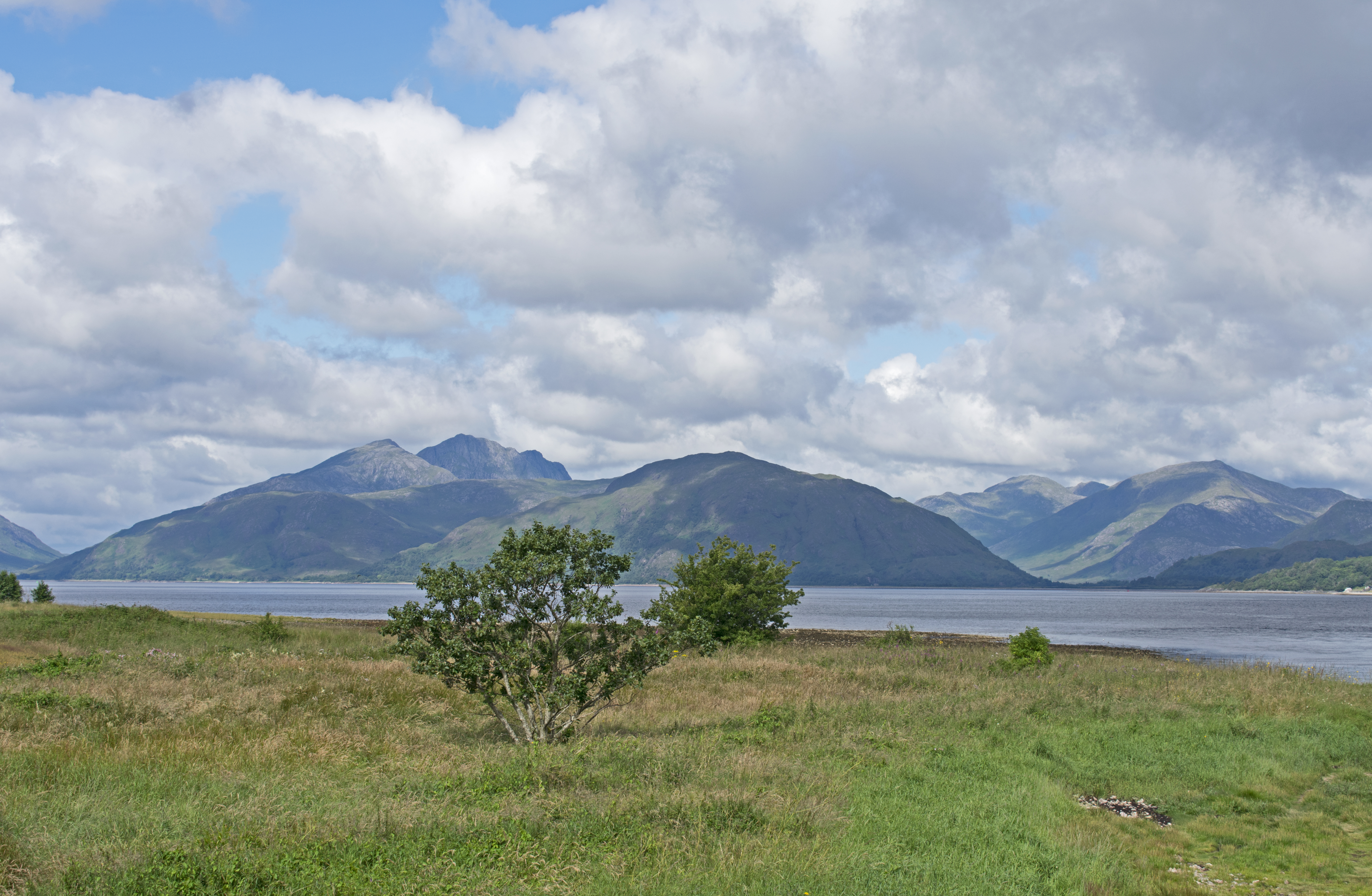
View of Loch Linnhe from Glenachulish

Glenachulish (Scottish Gaelic: Gleann a' Chaolais: valley of the narrows; pronounced Glen – ah – hoolish) is a hamlet and glen which lie close to the village of Ballachulish in the Scottish Highlands.

== Etymology ==
The name derives from the narrows in the sea loch, Loch Leven, where it joins Loch Linnhe.

== Village ==
Glenachulish was a forestry village. The original houses there were built by the Forestry Commission in the mid 20th century. Subsequent house building has swelled the number of dwelling places, though the actual population probably peaked in the 1970s. While the original inhabitants came to work in forestry (many of them, ironically, from Hebridean islands where few trees grow). The current population includes some who have moved to the area from Central Scotland and England.

== Glen ==
The wooded Glenachulish is a setting, within the horseshoe of the popular Beinn a' Bheithir.
