= Shuna Island =

Island in Loch Linnhe in Argyll and Bute, Scotland

Siùna (Gaelic)
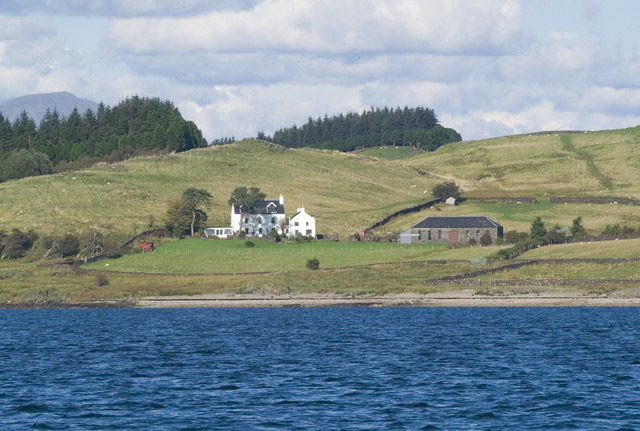
- The farm on Shuna

Location
- Shuna shown within Argyll and Bute
- OS grid reference: NM916490
- Coordinates: 56.59°N 5.395°W

Name
- Name meaning: either "watching island" or "sea island", both from Norse

Physical geography
- Island group: Loch Linnhe
- Area: 155 ha (383 acres)
- Area rank: 121
- Highest elevation: Tom an t-Seallaidh 71 m (233 ft)

Administration
- Council area: Argyll and Bute
- Country: Scotland
- Sovereign state: United Kingdom

Demographics
- Population: 0

Shuna Island or simply Shuna is an island in Loch Linnhe, offshore from Appin, in Argyll and Bute, Scotland. The island is approximately two kilometres (1 1/4 miles) long and one kilometre (5/8 mi) wide, and extends to some 155 ha (383 acres) in total. The island is characterised by a table topped hill at its southern end. The name Shuna is probably derived from the Norse, for "sea island". The island is separated from Appin by the Sound of Shuna.

Shuna is recorded in a late 16th-century document as belonging to John Stewart, the Laird of Appin. He may have built Castle Shuna, a small tower-house, which is now in ruins and lies at the south end. In the 18th century, Shuna Farmhouse replaced Castle Shuna as the residence on the island: it is a Category B listed traditional farmhouse dating from the 1740s. Opposite Castle Shuna, at the head of Loch Laich, is the island fortress of Castle Stalker, also historically a possession of the Stewarts of Appin.

The island forms part of the Lynn of Lorn National Scenic Area, one of 40 in Scotland.

In 2012 the island was placed on sale via agents Savills for £1.85 million.
