= Ballachulish figure =

The Ballachulish Figure
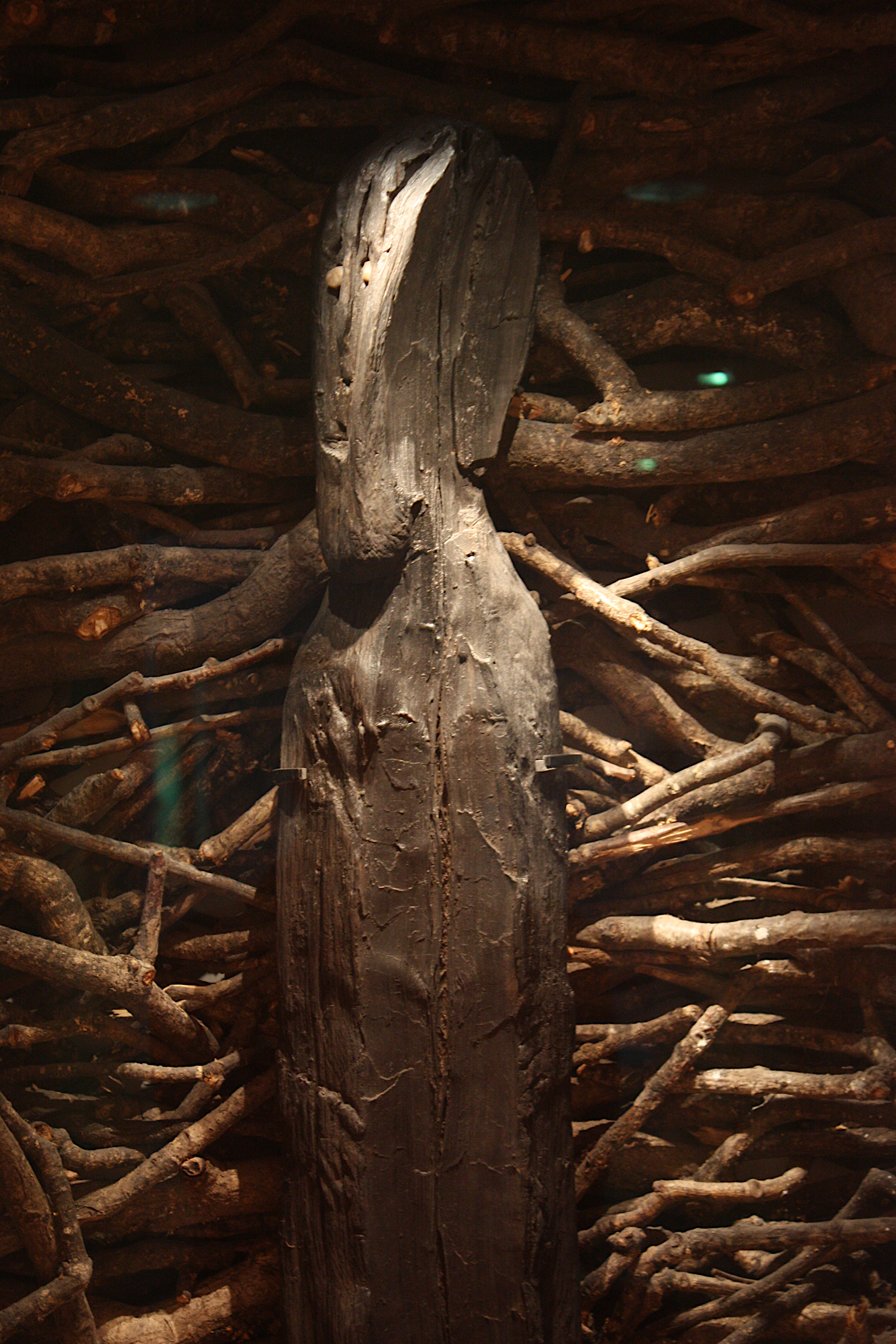
- The Ballachulish figure in the National Museum of Scotland
- Material: Alder, with quartz pebble eyes.
- Length: 145mm
- Height: 1390mm
- Width: 190mm
- Created: c.600 BC
- Discovered: Ballachulish, Nether Lochaber, Scotland
- Present location: National Museum of Scotland
- NMS website entry

The Ballachulish figure is a carved wooden sculpture, dated to c.600 BC, which was discovered in North Ballachulish, at the west of Loch Leven in Scotland in 1880, and is the only one of its kind to have been found in Scotland.

== Description ==
The figure is assumed to be of a young girl or woman, holding items in her hands. The figure is around five feet (1.5 m) tall, and is made of alder, although initial accounts of its discovery note it as being oak. The eyes are made of quartz pebbles.

Due to how it was stored before being transferred to the museum, the wood became warped and cracked, and her appearance now is greatly different from when she was discovered. Her purpose is not known, although she is sometimes described the Ballachulish Goddess, or supposed to be some kind of fertility goddess, and some modern popular descriptions have posited a connection to the Celtic Cailleach Bheur.

== Discovery ==
The figure was uncovered in November 1880, during digging work in the grounds of the Rev. Alexander Chinnery-Haldane, Dean of Argyll. The figure was laid face down, under four and a half feet (1.4 m) of peat, surrounded by wicker-like work, and on the site of a raised beach, suggesting that it originally stood by the edge of the loch.

Minister for the parish of Ballachulish and archaeologist Rev. Alexander Steuart wrote an account of the figure's discovery in The Inverness Courier in December 1880, and when the importance of the figure became apparent, he asked Sir Robert Christison, of the Society of Antiquaries of Scotland, to undertake further research and study. Mr Chinnery Haldane, upon whose land the figure was discovered, gifted the figure to the Society's Museum and precursor of the National Museum of Scotland, then named the National Museum of Antiquities of Scotland. Robert Christison published his findings in the Society's journal in November 1881.

The figure suffered some damage during transportation to Edinburgh, and upon arrival was found to be snapped at the ankles. Although the peat water had preserved the figure, problems with conservation in the period following her discovery (the figure was allowed to dry out) resulted in cracking and warping.

== Origins ==
Rev. Steuart had thought it to be a representation of an ancient Scandinavian deity. However, in 1967, Dr Anne Ross suggested that it was of Celtic origin.

In 1970, the figure was estimated to date from the 1st century BC or before; however radiocarbon dating carried out in 1990 suggested that it was in fact much older, at 540 ± 70 BC.

Although similar figures have been found in Europe, and elsewhere in Britain, the Ballachulish figure is the only one of its kind to have been found in Scotland.

== Current location ==
The Ballachulish figure is on permanent display in the Early Peoples section of the National Museum of Scotland in Edinburgh.
