= Nether Lochaber =

Church of Scotland parish

Coordinates: 56.695°N 5.181°W

Nether Lochaber (/ˌnɛðər lɒxˈɑːbər/ NEDH-ər lokh-AH-bər) in Lochaber, Highland, Scotland, is the modern (1950s) name for the Parish of Ballachulish and Onich. This Parish was formed, in 1911, out of the quoad sacra parish of Ballachulish and Corran of Ardgour which itself was formed, in 1829, out of the Parish of Kilmallie when the Thomas Telford Parliamentary churches were built at Creag Mhor in (north) Ballachulish and at Ardgour.

Nether Lochaber is made up of Onich and North Ballachulish. The community council covers these settlements as well as small settlements including Inchree, Bunree, Corrychurrachan and Keppanach; other features include Glen Righ Forest and the hills Beinn na Gucaig, Mam na Gualainn, Doire Bàn and Tom Meadhoin.

Nether Lochaber has a parish church in the village of Onich, constructed in 1911, in part using stone from the earlier church at Creag Mhor. It is described by Scotland's Churches Trust as "one of the finest rural churches in the Highlands".
