= James Haldane =

Scottish independent church leader

- Born: James Alexander Haldane; 14 July 1768; Dundee, Scotland
- Died: 8 February 1851 (aged 82); Edinburgh, Scotland
- Occupation: Evangelist
- Spouses: Mary Joass; Margaret Rutherford
- Children: Elizabeth Haldane; Catharine Haldane; James Haldane; Alexander Haldane; Mary Haldane; Margaret Haldane; Robert Haldane; Isabella Mitchelson Haldane; Daniel Rutherford Haldane; Adamina Dundas Duncan Haldane; Helen Haldane; George Oswald Haldane; James Haldane
- Theological work
- Tradition or movement: Church of Scotland; Independent; Baptist

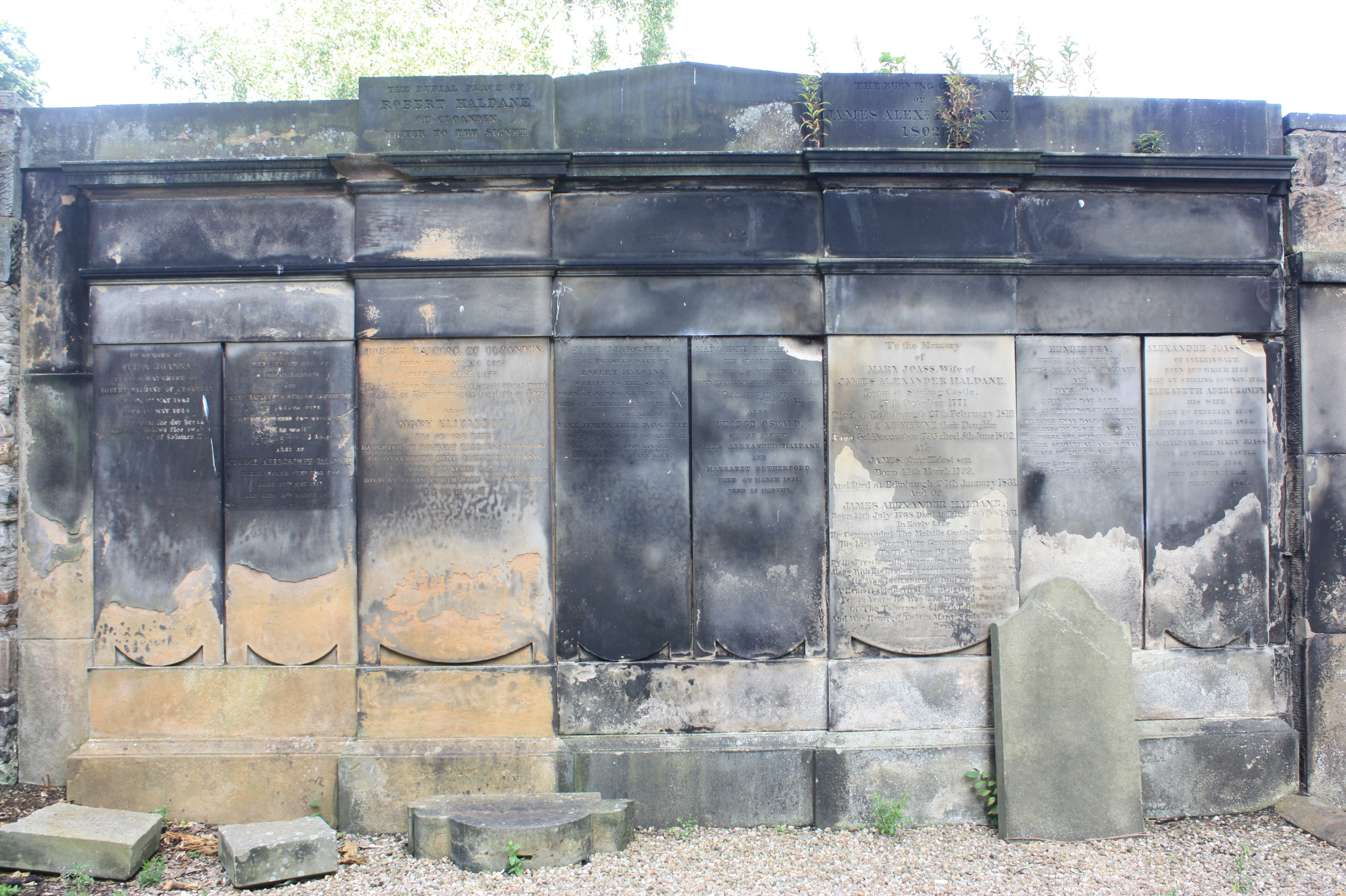
The Haldane grave, St Cuthberts Churchyard, Edinburgh

The Rev James Alexander Haldane aka Captain James Haldane (14 July 1768 – 8 February 1851) was a Scottish independent church leader following an earlier life as a sea captain.

== Biography ==
The youngest son of Captain James Haldane of Airthrey Castle (who died two weeks before he was born), (his older brother Robert Haldane was also a clergyman) in Stirlingshire, he was born at Dundee. His mother was sister to Admiral Adam Duncan, 1st Viscount Duncan.

He was educated first at Dundee Grammar School and afterwards at the High School in Edinburgh and University of Edinburgh. At the age of seventeen he joined the Honorable East India Company as a midshipman on board the ship, the Duke of Montrose. After four voyages to India, in the summer of 1793, he was promoted to captain and commander of the Melville Castle. He started a careful study of the Bible during his voyages, and also came under the evangelical influence of David Bogue of Gosport, one of the founders of the London Missionary Society.

He briefly returned to Scotland in 1793, and began preaching on an itinerant basis. He remained in HEICS until 1797, his final action being on home ground in the Spithead mutiny, where he boarded the "Dutton". He left the HEICS in the summer of 1797 and, encouraged by friends, began as a lay preacher in Gilmerton south of Edinburgh.

=== Evangelism ===
In about 1796 he became acquainted with the celebrated evangelical, Charles Simeon of Cambridge, in whose company he toured Scotland, distributing tracts and trying to awaken others to an interest in religious subjects.

He moved to Edinburgh and befriended Rev David Black of Lady Yester's Kirk and Walter Buchanan Second Charge of Canongate Kirk who persuaded him to become a minister.

In May 1797 he preached his first sermon, at Gilmerton near Edinburgh, with encouraging success. In the same year he established a non-sectarian organization for tract distribution and lay preaching called the Society for the Propagation of the Gospel at Home. During the next few years he made repeated missionary journeys, preaching wherever he could obtain hearers, and generally in the open air.

Around 1815 he moved to the city centre, living at 16 George Street and began preaching at the huge Tabernacle Church at the head of Leith Walk (now the site of the Playhouse Theatre).

Haldane was never a preacher for the Church of Scotland, but was an evangelical preacher, who proved more popular than the established church. His studies of the New Testament led him to leave that denomination behind and work in an independent church movement. Along with his brother, Robert Haldane, and others, James established 85 independent churches in Scotland and Ireland. Churches originated by the Haldanes practised baptism by immersion, weekly communion, and congregational polity (autonomous government). The Haldanes also operated a seminary and were influenced in their principles by other independency thinkers such as John Glas and Robert Sandeman of the Glasite church.

As advancing years compelled him to withdraw from the more exhausting labours of travel and open-air preaching, he sought to influence the discussion of current religious and theological questions by means of the press. In later years he adopted Baptist views.

He lived his final years at 34 Drummond Place in Edinburgh's Second New Town.

He died on 8 February 1851 aged 82, and is buried in the Haldane family plot in St Cuthbert's Churchyard at the west end of Princes Street in Edinburgh. The grave lies immediately east of the church on the wall backing onto Princes Street Gardens.

== Family ==
He married twice and had 13 children. He married first Mary Joass on 18 September 1793. Believed to have been born on 27 October 1771, she died on 27 February 1819. They had the following children:

- Elizabeth Haldane (1794–1843)
- Catharine Haldane (1797–1885)
- James Haldane (1799–1831)
- Alexander Haldane (15 October 1800 – 19 July 1882)
  - Among whose children was Alexander Chinnery-Haldane (1842–1906), Bishop of Argyll and the Isles
- Mary Haldane (1801 – 7 November 1857)
- Margaret Haldane (1803–89)
- Robert Haldane (1805–77)
  - Father of Richard (Secretary of State for War 1905–12), John Scott and Elizabeth Haldane, among others.

In 1822 he married for a second time to Margaret Rutherford, daughter of Daniel Rutherford. They had the following children:

- Isabella Mitchelson Haldane (1823–92), married Richard Burdon-Sanderson (1821–76) in 1853
- Daniel Rutherford Haldane (1824–87), physician.
  - Father of General Sir James Aylmer Haldane, among others.
- Adamina Dundas Duncan Haldane (1826–98)
- Helen Haldane (1828–73)
- George Oswald Haldane (1829–31)
- James Haldane

== Publications ==
Among Haldane's numerous contributions to theological discussions were:

- The Duty of Christian Forbearance in Regard to Points of Church Order (1811)
- Strictures on a Publication upon Primitive Christianity by Mr John Walker (1819)
- Refutation of Edward Irving's Heretical Doctrines respecting the Person and Atonement of Jesus Christ. His Observations on Universal Pardon, etc., was a contribution to the controversy regarding the views of Thomas Erskine of Linlathen and Campbell of Row.
- Man's Responsibility (1842) is a reply to Howard Hinton on the nature and extent of the Atonement.

He also published:

- Journal of a Tour in the North (1801)
- Early Instruction Commended (1801)
- Views of the Social Worship of the First Churches (1805)
- The Doctrine and Duty of Self-Examination (1806)
- The Doctrine of tile Atonement (1845)
- Exposition of the Epistle to the Galatians (1848).
- The Wisdom of God Displayed in the Mystery of the Redemption

== See also ==
- Clan Haldane
- James Haldane (diplomat)
- Richard Haldane, 1st Viscount Haldane
