= Alexander Haldane =

Scottish newspaper proprietor and barrister

- Born: 15 October 1800; Edinburgh
- Died: 19 July 1882 (aged 81); London
- Education: University of Edinburgh
- Occupations: Barrister, Newspaper proprietor
- Years active: 1828–1882
- Spouse: Emma Corsbie (1800–1867)
- Children: Alexander Chinnery-Haldane and five daughters
- Parent: James Haldane

Alexander Haldane (15 October 1800 – 19 July 1882) was a Scottish barrister and newspaper proprietor. He was known as a religious controversialist and evangelical of the Church of England.

== Early life and education ==
He was the son of James Alexander Haldane and his first wife Mary Joass, and nephew of Robert Haldane. He studied at Edinburgh High School. He was then sent with his elder brother James in 1814 for a year to a private school at Winteringham in Lincolnshire, run by Lorenzo Grainger who was a curate there and an evangelical.

Haldane returned to Scotland and the University of Edinburgh. The brothers were invited in 1819 by Thomas Babington to Rothley Temple. Alexander entered the Inner Temple in 1820, and was called to the bar in 1826. He acted as junior to Lord Brougham in an appeal case to the House of Lords. But he then concentrated on conveyancing work.

== Religious views ==
As a young man, Haldane was involved with Henry Drummond (1786–1860) and the Albury circle around him. His views, correspondingly, were Irvingite, and on prophecy premillennialist. They later shaded to those more usual for evangelical Anglicans. He advocated for verbal inspiration of the Bible.

== The Record ==
Haldane is best remembered as the chief proprietor of The Record, the campaigning evangelical newspaper he helped found in 1828. It began publication in January 1828, but almost immediately financial troubles arose. Haldane was with a lay evangelical group that rescued it later in the year. From that point, to his death in 1881, he wrote most of the paper's editorials. The line taken was a strident Calvinistic evangelicalism: Tory, anti-Catholic, opposed to Broad Church thinking and the left.

The Record gave its name to the "Recordite" faction of evangelicals in the Church of England. By the 1830s their characteristic views were represented in Parliament and proposed legislation.

The term "Recordite" itself was brought to wide attention by William John Conybeare in the Edinburgh Review for October 1853, who derided the position attached to it as a dogmatisation and rigidification of evangelical practices. Haldane's Record returned the compliment the following month, describing Conybeare as "a brummagem Sydney Smith."

== Associations ==
Haldane was a personal friend and close adviser of the social reformer Lord Ashley, in later life 7th Earl of Shaftesbury. An extensive correspondence between them began in 1849. In 1850 Edward Bickersteth, an intimate evangelical friend of Ashley, died. Subsequently Ashley, who had kept the views of The Record at arms length, had more time for them.

He supported the Open Air Mission of John MacGregor, sitting on its committee.

== Works ==
- Two letters ... containing statements about concealment and mutilation in the pamphlet of Anglicanus From the Apocrypha Controversy, during which Alexander Haldane, at the request of his uncle Robert, sat on the Committee of the British and Foreign Bible Society. This and other pamphlets were addressed to the Rev. Andrew Brandram, secretary of the Society.
- Answer to the statement of the Edinburgh Corresponding Board; more especially as it relates to the concealment and mutilation of documents by the Earl Street Committee, and to Dr. L. Van Ess (1828)
- A Letter to the Committee of the Bradford Bible Society: Relative to Certain Misrepresentations Made by the Rev. Andrew Brandram, in His Late Visit to Bradford (1829)
- Memoirs of the Lives of Robert Haldane of Airthrey: And of His Brother, James Alexander Haldane (1854)

== Family ==
Haldane married in 1822 Emma Corsbie Hardcastle, daughter of Joseph Hardcastle (1752–1819). They had five daughters, and a son, Alexander Chinnery-Haldane.
