= Daniel Rutherford Haldane =

British physician (1824–1887)

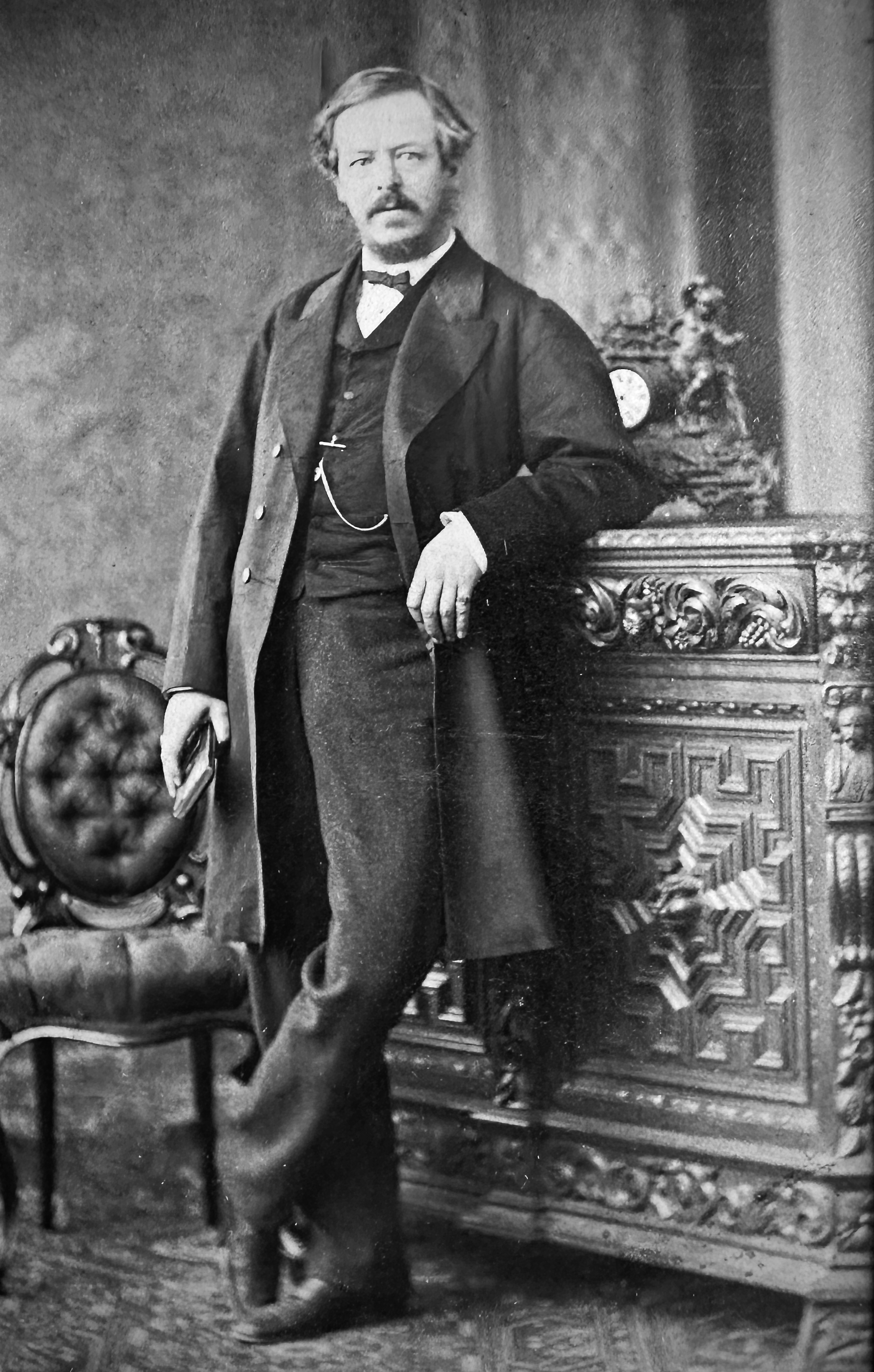

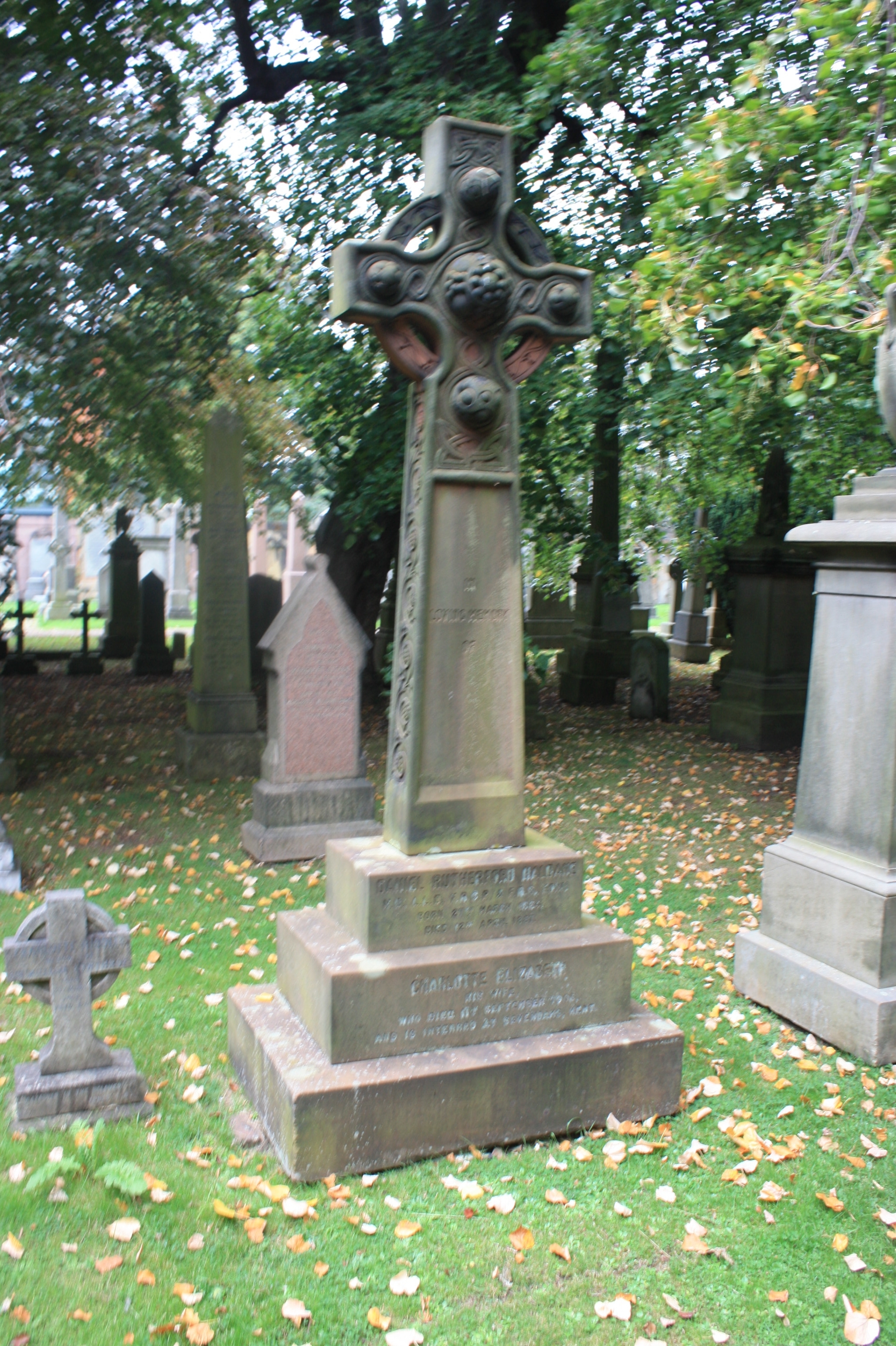
The grave of Daniel Rutherford Haldane, Dean Cemetery

Daniel Rutherford Haldane FRSE PRCPE LLD (27 March 1824 – 12 April 1887) was a British physician, who became president of the Royal College of Physicians of Edinburgh in 1881.

== Life ==
His was born in Edinburgh the son of Rev James Haldane by his second wife Margaret Rutherford, a daughter of Professor Daniel Rutherford. He was educated at the High School in Edinburgh then studied medicine at the University of Edinburgh, graduating in 1848. He then undertook further postgraduate study in Vienna and Paris.

He became Resident Physician at the Edinburgh Royal Infirmary and also served at the city's Dispensaries. He taught various medical subjects at the University of Edinburgh. He became Pathologist and Consulting Physician at the Edinburgh Royal Infirmary. In 1846 he served as President of the Royal Medical Society. In 1853 Haldane was elected a member of the Harveian Society of Edinburgh and served as President in 1880.

In 1867 he was elected a Fellow of the Royal Society of Edinburgh his proposer was John Hutton Balfour. The University of Edinburgh awarded him a second honorary doctorate (LLD) in 1883. In 1867 he was also elected a member of the Aesculapian Club and in 1877 became its Honorary Secretary. He remained in this role until his death.

From 1879 to 1882 he served as President of the Royal College of Physicians of Edinburgh.

He died on 12 April 1887 at his home 22 Charlotte Square and is buried in the north-west section of the original sections of Dean Cemetery in Edinburgh.

== Family ==
On 17 September 1856 he married Charlotte Elizabeth Lowthrop (died 11 September 1908), daughter of James Lowthrop of Welton Hall.

- Charlotte Wilhelmina Lowthrop Haldane
- <unknown female> (1857–?)
- Margaret Harriet Rutherford Haldane
- Edith Millicent Haldane, (1861–1862)
- Alice Mary Haldane, (1861–?)
- General Sir James Aylmer Lowthorpe Haldane (1862–1950)
- Anne Evelyn Haldane, (1864–?) married Charles John Haldane Hogg, son of Sir Frederick Russell Hogg.

== Artistic recognition ==
A bust of Haldane by Charles McBride is held at the Royal College of Physicians of Edinburgh.
