= Achindarroch =

Coordinates: 56.64°N 05.26°W

Achadh nan Darach
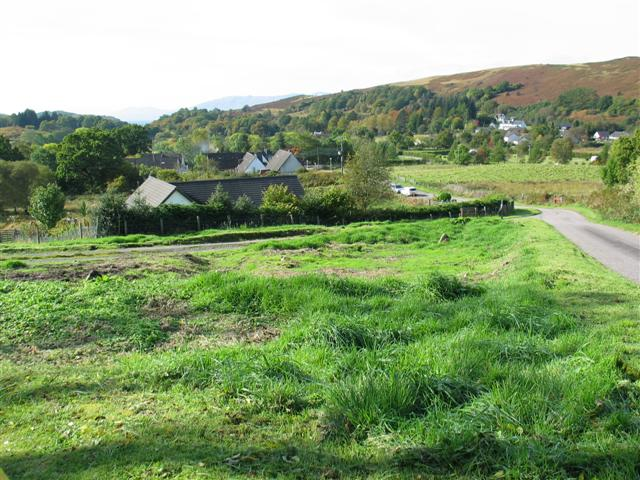
- Achadh nan Darrach

- Location within the Lochaber area
- OS grid reference: NN0055
- Council area: Highland
- Country: Scotland
- Sovereign state: United Kingdom
- Police: Scotland
- Fire: Scottish
- Ambulance: Scottish

Achadh nan Darach (English: Achindarroch or Achnandarach) is a hamlet in Highland, Scotland. It lies near the banks of Loch Linnhe on the A828 road, just south of Kentallen, several miles southwest of Fort William. Its name means "field of oaks". It lies at the edge of the Glen Duror Forest, which stretches further to the east and southeast.

== History ==
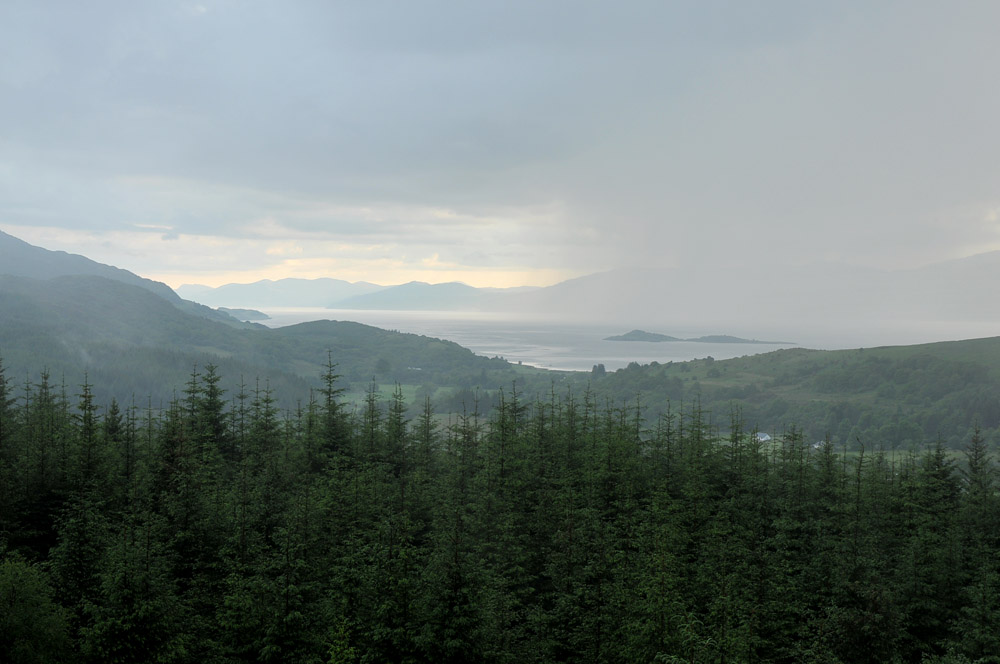
View of Lock Linnhe from Achindarroch's Glen Duror Forest

Achnidarroch is mentioned in the popular novel Kidnapped by Robert Louis Stevenson; "Duncan Baan Stewart in Achindarroch his father was a Bastard". It refers to the Appin Murder of May 1752 which took place in tumultuous aftermath of the Jacobite Rising of 1745. James Stewart (also known as Seumas a' Ghlinne (James of the Glen) was found guilty in a notorious miscarriage of justice. Achnidarroch is documented as a place with a legal servant named McKenzie stopped off at in a search to find James Stewart, eventually finding him sowing seeds at Acharn.

Historically, the estate was owned by the Campbell family. The house of Achindarroch is located on the banks of the Crinan Canal. In the 1870s it was reportedly leased to a James Scott for £433 and he ran a farm at Achindarroch with Highland cattle and black-faced sheep.

== Facilities ==
Achindarroch contains a caravan and camping site.
