= Mam na Gualainn =

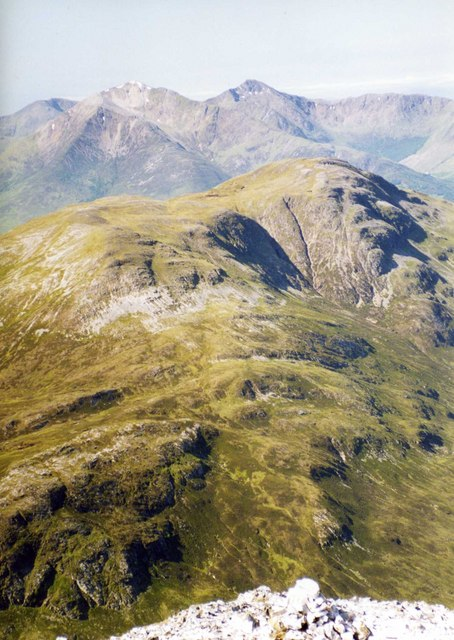
- Mam na Gualainn in the foreground with Beinn a' Bheithir behind

Highest point
- Elevation: 796 m (2,612 ft)
- Prominence: 461 m (1,512 ft)
- Listing: Corbett, Marilyn
- Coordinates: 56°43′00″N 5°04′51″W

Geography
- Location: Lochaber, Scotland
- Parent range: Grampian Mountains
- OS grid: NN115625
- Topo map: OS Landranger 41

Mam na Gualainn (797 m) is a mountain in the Grampian Mountains, Scotland. It lies above Loch Leven near the village of Kinlochleven in Lochaber.

The mountain takes the form of a long ridge on the north side of the loch. Its most distinguished feature is its eastern summit.
