= John Mackarness =

British bishop

The Right Reverend John Mackarness
- Bishop of Oxford
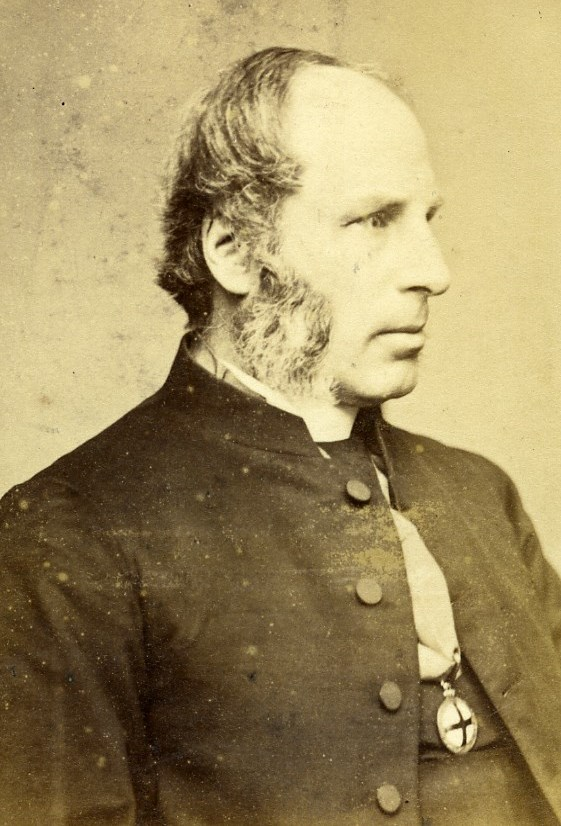
- Diocese: Diocese of Oxford
- Predecessor: Samuel Wilberforce
- Successor: William Stubbs

Orders
- Ordination: 18 May 1845
- Consecration: 25 January 1870

Personal details
- Born: 3 December 1820 Islington, Middlesex, United Kingdom
- Died: 16 September 1889 (aged 68) Eastbourne, Sussex, UK
- Denomination: Anglican
- Spouse: Alethea Buchanan Coleridge
- Education: Eton College; Merton College, Oxford

John Fielder Mackarness (3 December 1820 – 16 September 1889) was a Church of England bishop.

== Life ==
He was born in Islington (then in the county of Middlesex, now in Greater London) on 8 December 1820, the eldest son of John Mackarness, a West India merchant (died 2 January 1870), and Catherine, daughter of George Smith Coxhead, a physician. His younger brother George served as the Bishop of Argyll and The Isles from 1874 to 1883.

He was educated at Eton College and Merton College, Oxford. After matriculation he was elected a Fellow of Exeter College, Oxford. Mackarness was ordained on Sunday 18 May 1845. He was Vicar of St BartholomewTardebigge (1845–1855); Rector of Honiton (1855–1870) and finally Bishop of Oxford (1870–1889). At Eton he was captain of the football club, he rowed in the Merton boat, and was president of the Oxford Union.

From 11 August 1846 to 1855, he held the vicarage of Tardebigge in Worcestershire, and from 1854 to 1868, he was an honorary canon of Worcester Cathedral. On the nomination of William Courtenay, 11th Earl of Devon, he was appointed to the rectory of Honiton, Devonshire, in 1855, and as such was responsible for the management of Honiton grammar school. This preferment he retained until his appointment to the episcopal bench, holding with it from 1858 a prebendal stall in Exeter Cathedral, and from 1867 the adjoining vicarage of Monkton.

In 1866, he was elected as proctor in convocation for that diocese, but lost his seat in 1869 through declining to oppose the disestablishment of the Irish church. By the recommendation of William Ewart Gladstone, he was appointed to the see of Oxford, being consecrated bishop on 25 January 1870, and invested as Chancellor of the Order of the Garter on 5 February 1870. He discharged the duties of that see until 1888, when failing health compelled him to retire, his resignation taking legal effect on 17 November 1888.

He died at Angus House, Eastbourne, Sussex, on 16 September 1889, and was buried on 21 September in Sandhurst Churchyard, Berkshire. He had become a Doctor of Divinity (DD).

== Assessment ==
As a bishop, Mackarness was fearless and independent, without any trace of affectation, and the sermon which Ince (a professor) preached at Christ Church Cathedral, Oxford, on 22 September 1889, and afterwards published, bore public witness to the regard which the clergy of his diocese had for him.

When an attempt was made to force him to take proceedings against the rector of Clewer, he argued the case in person before the judges of the queen's bench division. Judgment went against him, but on carrying the case to the court of appeal it was given in his favour, and this decision was confirmed by the House of Lords. A liberal in politics, he voted in the lords against the Afghan war and the Public Worship Regulation Act, while he supported the bill for allowing dissenters to be buried in churchyards with services from their own ministers, and the measure for the removal of religious tests in the universities.

On surrendering to the ecclesiastical commissioners the management of the Oxford bishopric estates, Mackarness, with singular honesty, paid to them the sum of £1,729, being the estimated amount which he had received therefrom in excess of his statutory income during the previous nine years.

== Family ==
He married Alethea Buchanan Coleridge on 7 August 1849 at Ottery Saint Mary, Devon, daughter of Sir John Taylor Coleridge. She was born in 1826 in London and died on 30 March 1909. Her parents were John Taylor Coleridge and Mary Buchanan. Together they had eight children; one of whom was Frederick Michael Coleridge Mackarness a prominent barrister then judge who also served as the Liberal MP for the Newbury constituency between 1906 and 1910. Another son, Charles won the FA Cup with Oxford University in 1874, before going on to have a long career in the church, becoming Archdeacon of the East Riding from 1898 to 1916.

== Works ==
Mackarness was the author of numerous sermons and charges, and until his elevation to the see of Oxford he regularly contributed to The Guardian. His major publications were :

- A few Words to the Country Parsons on the Election for Oxford University. By One of Themselves, 1847.
- A Plea for toleration, in Answer to the No Popery Cry, 1850.
- May or Must, a letter to Alfred Pott, Archdeacon of Berkshire, 1879.

With the Rev. Richard Seymour he edited in 1862 Eighteen Years of a Clerical Meeting, being the Minutes of the Alcester Clerical Association, 1842–60. A sermon by him on the death of Lord Lyttelton, to whom he was for some time honorary chaplain, appeared in Brief Memorials of Lord Lyttelton, 1876.

== Sources ==
- This article incorporates text from a publication now in the public domain: Courtney, William Prideaux (1893). "Mackarness, John Fielder". In Lee, Sidney (ed.). Dictionary of National Biography. Vol. 35. London: Smith, Elder & Co.
- Mosley, Charles, editor. Burke's Peerage, Baronetage & Knightage, 107th edition, volume 1. Wilmington, Delaware, U.S.A.: Burke's Peerage (Genealogical Books) Ltd, 2003. page 851

Church of England titles
Preceded by Samuel Wilberforce	Bishop of Oxford; 1870–1889	Succeeded by William Stubbs
