= George Mackarness =

Scottish bishop (1823–1883)

The Right Reverend George Mackarness
- Bishop of Argyll and The Isles
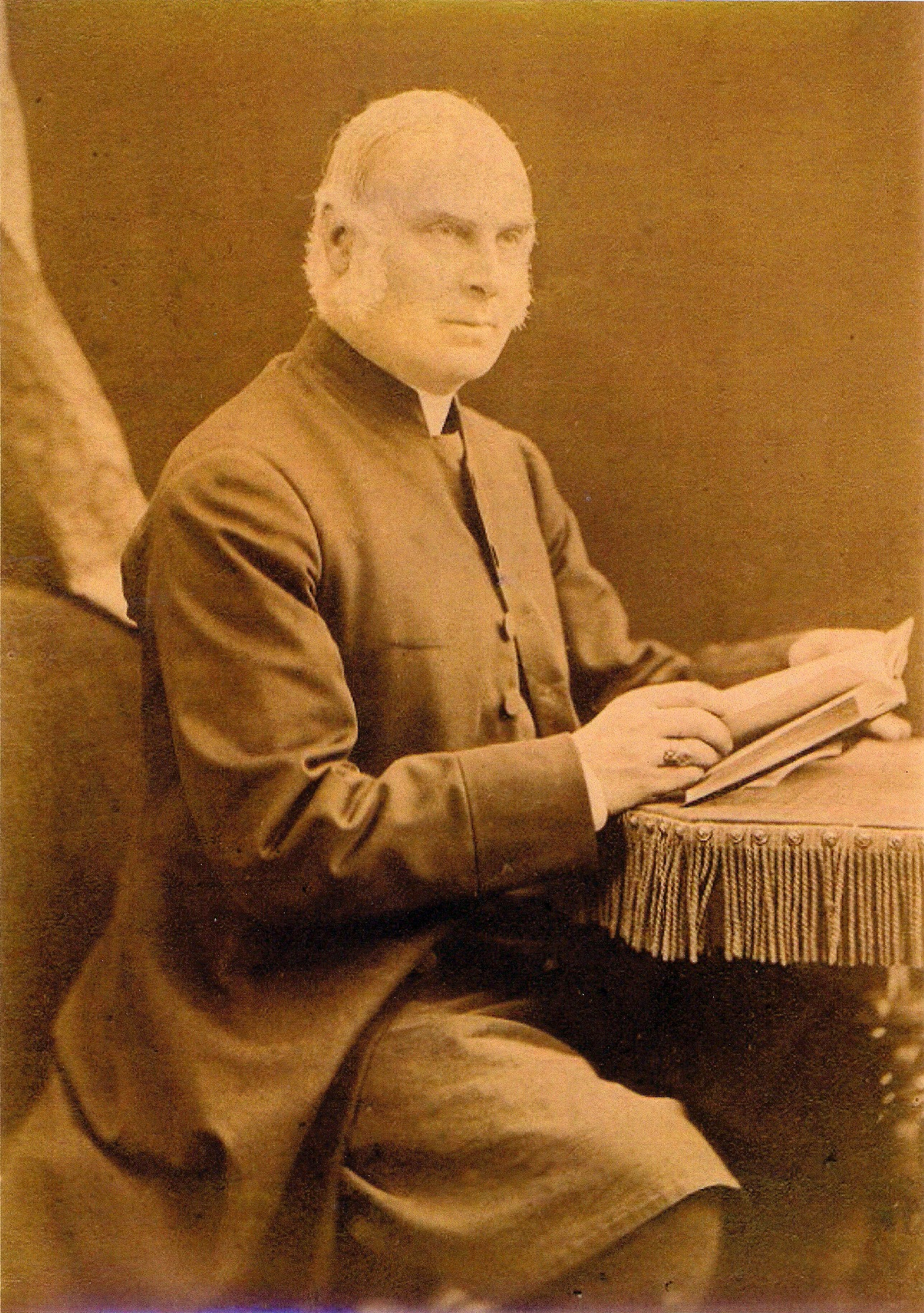
- Church: Scottish Episcopal Church
- Diocese: Argyll and The Isles
- In office: 1874-1883
- Predecessor: Alexander Ewing
- Successor: Alexander Chinnery-Haldane

Orders
- Ordination: 1846
- Consecration: 1874

Personal details
- Born: 30 March 1823
- Died: 20 April 1883 (aged 60)
- Buried: St Peter's churchyard, Ellastone
- Denomination: Anglican
- Spouse: Mary Ann Young, Gertrude Granville

George Richard Mackarness (30 March 1823 – 20 April 1883) was Bishop of Argyll and The Isles in the Scottish Episcopal Church in the last third of the 19th century.

Mackarness was the second son of John Mackarness, a West India merchant of Elstree House, Bath. His older brother John was the Bishop of Oxford from 1870 until 1889. His younger brother Henry was also a vicar.

He was educated at Merton College, Oxford and ordained in 1846. He held incumbencies at Ilam, Lochgilphead and Oban.

He served with the Society for the Propagation of the Gospel, and contributed to the Hursley Magazine.

He was married to Mary Ann Young, who died on April 15, 1873. They had one child, George Evelyn Mackarness. Five years later he married Gertrude Granville.

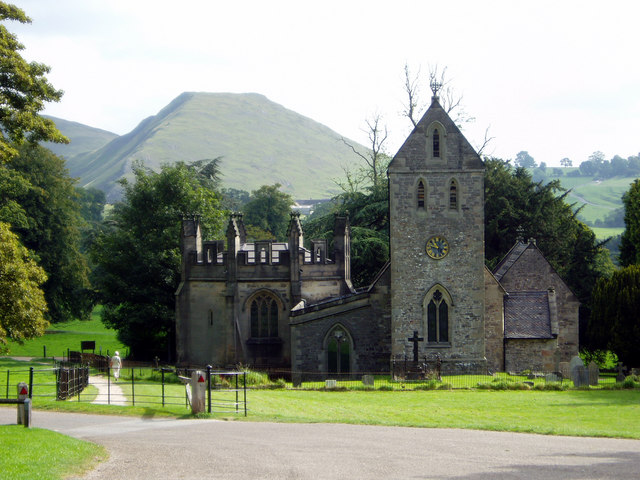
Church of the Holy Cross, Ilam - where Mackarness was incumbent 1854-1874

He died on 20 April 1883.

Scottish Episcopal Church titles
Preceded by Alexander Ewing	Episcopalian Bishop of Argyll and The Isles; 1874–1883	Succeeded by Alexander Chinnery-Haldane
