= Beinn a' Bheithir =

Mountain in the Scottish Highlands

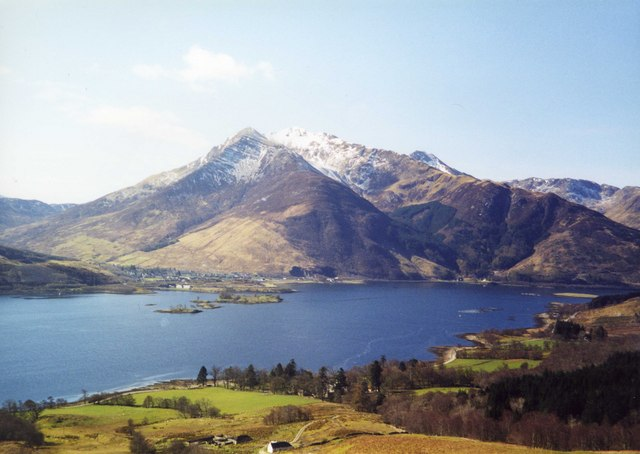
- The eastern part of Beinn a' Bheithir seen from Mam na Gualainn to the north across Loch Leven.

Highest point
- Elevation: 1,024 m (3,360 ft)
- Prominence: 729 m (2,392 ft)
- Parent peak: Bidean nam Bian
- Listing: Marilyn, Munro
- Coordinates: 56°39′13″N 5°10′18″W

Naming
- Language of name: Scottish Gaelic
- Pronunciation: Scottish Gaelic: [ˈpeiɲ ə ˈvehɪɾʲ] English approximation: BAYN ə VEH-hər

Geography
- Location within Scotland
- Location: Glen Coe, Scotland
- Parent range: Grampian Mountains
- OS grid: NN056558
- Topo map: OS Landranger 41

Climbing
- Easiest route: Hike

Beinn a' Bheithir (Scottish Gaelic for 'mountain of the beast' / 'mountain of the thunderbolt') is a mountain south of Ballachulish and Loch Leven in the Scottish Highlands. It has two Munro summits: Sgorr Dhearg (Sgòrr Dhearg pronounced [s̪kuːrˠ ˈʝɛɾɛk] meaning 'Red Peak') at 1,024 m (3,360 ft) and Sgorr Dhonuill (Sgòrr Dhòmhnaill meaning 'Donald's Peak') at 1,001 m (3,284 ft).

The mountain forms a horseshoe shape, with ridges pointing north enclosing the corrie of Gleann a' Chaolais (Glenachulish). The lower slopes on this side are cloaked in conifer plantations. To the south the mountain forms a steep ridge forming the northern wall of Glen Duror, which is also forested.

== Climbing ==
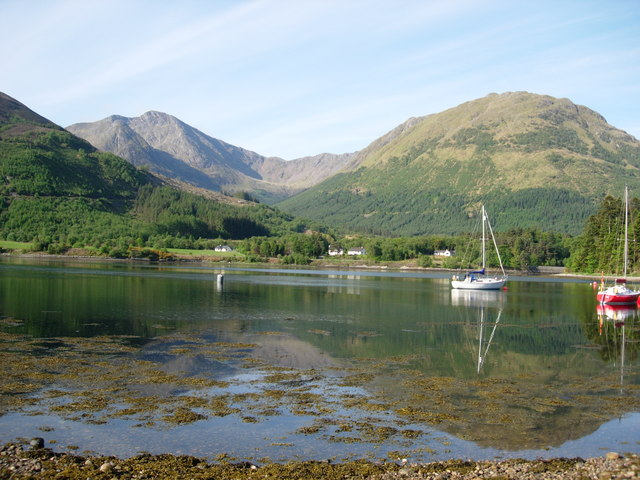
The western part of Beinn a' Beithir

Listed summits of Beinn a' Bheithir
Name	Grid ref	Height	Status
Sgorr Dhearg	NN056886	1,024 m (3,360 ft)	Marilyn, Munro
Sgorr Dhonuill	NN040555	1,001 m (3,284 ft)	Marilyn, Munro

There are several routes up Beinn a' Bheithir. One of the simplest is to head through the forestry up Gleann a' Chaolais, reaching the 757 m (2,484 ft) high bealach between the two summits. Both summits can be bagged from here, and the walker may descend by the route of ascent.

Other routes on include the north and northwest ridges of Sgorr Dhearg, or a steep ascent from Glen Duror.

== Folktale ==
The mountain at whose base tourists to Glencoe are landed was first called Beinn Ghuilbin but is now known as Beinn Bheithir. By tradition it got this name from a dragon which, long ago, took shelter in Corrie Liath, a great hollow in the face of the mountain and almost right above Ballachulish Pier. This dragon was apparently a terror to the surrounding district. From the lip of the corrie she overlooked the path round the foot of the mountain and, if the unsuspecting traveller attempted to pass by her, she would leap down and tear him to pieces.

No one dared attack her nor could anyone tell how she might be destroyed until Charles, the Skipper, came the way. He anchored his vessel a good distance out from the site of the present pier and, between the vessel and the shore, formed a bridge of empty barrels lashed together with ropes and bristling with iron spikes. When the bridge was finished he kindled a large fire on board the vessel and placed pieces of flesh on the burning embers. As soon as the savour of burning flesh reached the corrie the dragon descended by a succession of leaps to the shore and thence tried to make her way out on the barrels to the vessel. But the spikes entered her body and tore her up so badly that she was nearly dead before she reached the outer edge of the bridge. Meantime the vessel was moved from the bridge until a wide interval was left between it and the last barrel. Over this interval the dragon had not sufficient strength left to leap to the deck of the vessel and, as she could not return the way she came, she died of her wounds where she was, at the end of the bridge.

The people who lived in the neighbourhood of the mountain felt now at peace. But, if they did, little did they know of the new danger which threatened them. The cause of this new danger was a whelp which the old dragon left behind her in Corrie Liath. In course of time the whelp became a full-grown dragon which had a brood of young dragons hidden away in a corn stack at the foot of the mountain. When the farmer discovered them in his stack he at once set fire to it hoping thus to destroy the dangerous vermin it contained. Their shrieking was, with the wind, borne up the mountain-side and, as soon as it reached their mother, down she rushed to their assistance. But she was long in reaching them and in spite of all her efforts they were burned to death. When she saw this she stretched herself on a flat rock near the shore and continued to lash the rock with her tail until she killed herself.

The rock is still known as the Dragon's Rock, and on it Beinn Bheithir House now stood (as reported in 1910). A writer in 1923 tells that:

The first house which you pass after leaving the [Ballachulish] pier is built on what was known as the Dragon's Rock ... This dragon ... lashed herself to death on the rock now known as the "Dragon's," at the foot of the mountain, thenceforth called Ben Vair — the "hill of the dragon".
