= Eric Brodnax =

US Virgin Islands equestrian (born 1964)

Personal information
- Nationality: American Virgin Islander
- Born: September 7, 1964 (age 61) San Juan, Puerto Rico

Sport
- Sport: Equestrian

Eric Brodnax (born September 7, 1964) was an equestrian who represented the United States Virgin Islands in the individual eventing at the 1988 Summer Olympics. He is a graduate of Princeton University and The Wharton School at the University of Pennsylvania.
