= Onich =

Coordinates: 56.703°N 5.225°W

Onich: Scottish Gaelic: Omhanaich
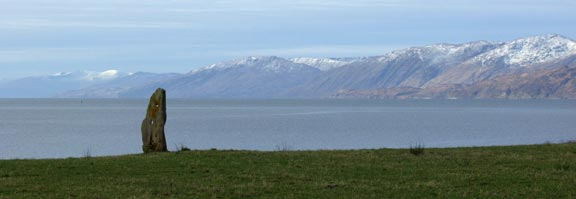
- Clach-a-Charra standing stone, Onich

- Location within the Lochaber area
- OS grid reference: NN0215561760
- Council area: Highland
- Country: Scotland
- Sovereign state: United Kingdom
- Post town: Fort William
- Postcode district: PH33
- Dialling code: 01855 821
- Police: Scotland
- Fire: Scottish
- Ambulance: Scottish

Onich (/ˈoʊnɪx/; Gaelic: Omhanaich, 'abounding in froth, frothy place'), also spelled Ounich, is a village in the historic county of Inverness-shire on the east shore of Loch Linnhe, Scotland and, together with North Ballachulish at the entrance to Loch Leven, forms Nether Lochaber.

== Area ==
St Bride’s Church was built in 1874 by the Edinburgh architect John Garden Brown. Onich to North Ballachulish Woods forms a Special Area of Conservation because of its old sessile oak woods with Ilex and Blechnum.

== Climate ==
As with much of the British Isles, Onich experiences a maritime climate with cool summers and mild winters. Rainfall is high, approaching an annual average of 2,000 mm (80 in). Onich holds the record for highest temperature reported, 32.1 °C (89.8 °F), for this part of Scotland (also the furthest north such a high value has been recorded in the British Isles). It also holds the highest Scottish minimum temperature for July at 20.0.C set in July 1948.

Climate data for Onich 1971-2000, 12 m (39 ft) asl (Sunshine, Rainfall and Extremes, 1951-1980)
Month	Jan	Feb	Mar	Apr	May	Jun	Jul	Aug	Sep	Oct	Nov	Dec	Year
Record high °C (°F)	16.7 (62.1)	14.4 (57.9)	18.9 (66.0)	21.5 (70.7)	26.5 (79.7)	28.5 (83.3)	30.0 (86.0)	32.1 (89.8)	23.9 (75.0)	23.3 (73.9)	16.0 (60.8)	14.4 (57.9)	32.1 (89.8)
Mean daily maximum °C (°F)	6.8 (44.2)	7.4 (45.3)	9.0 (48.2)	11.9 (53.4)	15.6 (60.1)	17.1 (62.8)	18.6 (65.5)	18.4 (65.1)	15.8 (60.4)	12.8 (55.0)	9.2 (48.6)	7.4 (45.3)	12.5 (54.5)
Mean daily minimum °C (°F)	0.9 (33.6)	1.1 (34.0)	2.0 (35.6)	3.0 (37.4)	5.4 (41.7)	7.9 (46.2)	10.0 (50.0)	9.8 (49.6)	8.0 (46.4)	5.8 (42.4)	2.9 (37.2)	1.7 (35.1)	4.9 (40.8)
Record low °C (°F)	−12 (10)	−10 (14)	−8 (18)	−6.5 (20.3)	−4 (25)	0.5 (32.9)	2.2 (36.0)	1.7 (35.1)	−2.0 (28.4)	−3.5 (25.7)	−6.7 (19.9)	−11.1 (12.0)	−12 (10)
Average precipitation mm (inches)	200 (7.9)	132 (5.2)	152 (6.0)	111 (4.4)	103 (4.1)	124 (4.9)	137 (5.4)	150 (5.9)	199 (7.8)	215 (8.5)	220 (8.7)	238 (9.4)	1,981 (78.0)
Mean monthly sunshine hours	27.9	62.2	89.9	132.0	164.3	150.0	114.7	117.8	87.0	65.1	33.0	18.6	1,062.5
Source 1: YR.NO
Source 2: ScotClim
