= Ballachulish =

Village in Lochaber, Highland, Scotland

Coordinates: 56.675512°N 5.133898°W

Ballachulish: Scottish Gaelic: Baile a' Chaolais
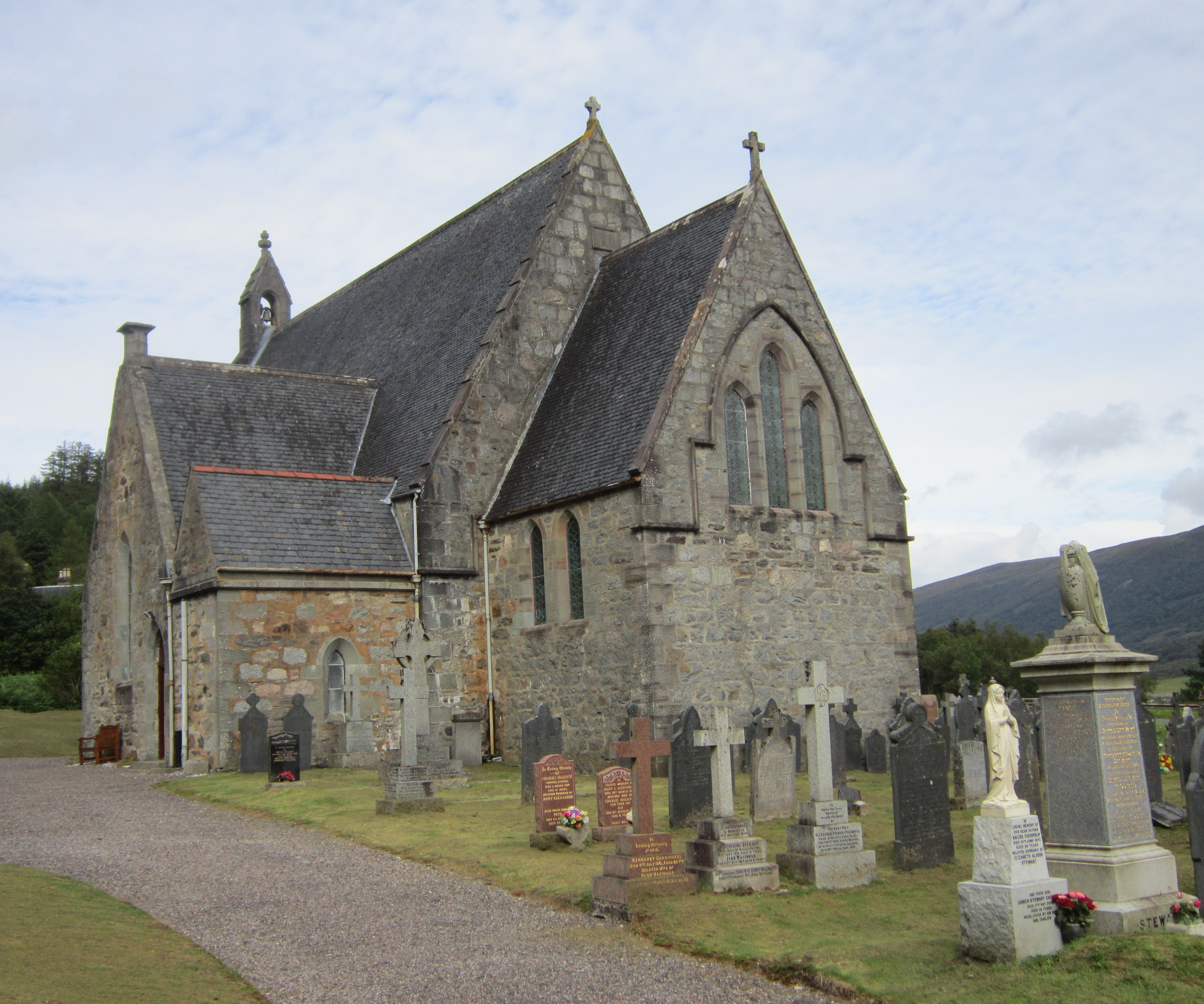
- St John's Episcopal Church

- Location within the Lochaber area
- Population: 620 (2020)
- OS grid reference: NN061579
- Council area: Highland
- Country: Scotland
- Sovereign state: United Kingdom
- Post town: Ballachulish
- Postcode district: PH49
- Dialling code: 01855
- Police: Scotland
- Fire: Scottish
- Ambulance: Scottish

The village of Ballachulish (/ˌbæləˈxuːlɪʃ/ BAL-ə-KHOO-lish or /ˌbæləˈhuːlɪʃ/ BAL-ə-HOO-lish, from Scottish Gaelic Baile a' Chaolais [baləˈxɯːl̪ˠɪʃ]) in Lochaber, Highland, Scotland, is centred on former slate quarries, and now primarily serves tourists in the area.

== Name ==
The name Ballachulish (from Scottish Gaelic, Baile a' Chaolais) means "the Village by the Narrows". The narrows in question is Caolas Mhic Phàdraig – Peter or Patrick's son's narrows, at the mouth of Loch Leven. The name Ballachulish (Ballecheles, 1522 – Straits town) was more correctly applied to the area now called North Ballachulish, to the north of Loch Leven, but was usurped for the quarry villages at East Laroch and West Laroch, either side of the River Laroch, which were actually within Glencoe and South Ballachulish respectively.

== Overview ==
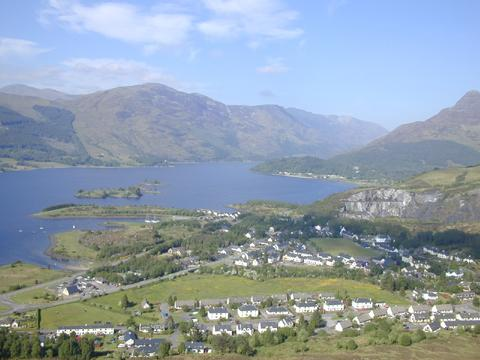
Ballachulish from Beinn a' Bheithir

As there was no road to the head of Loch Leven until 1927, the Ballachulish Ferry, established in 1733, and those at Invercoe/Callert and Caolas na Con were essential. The Ballachulish ferry closed in December 1975 when the Ballachulish Bridge finally opened.

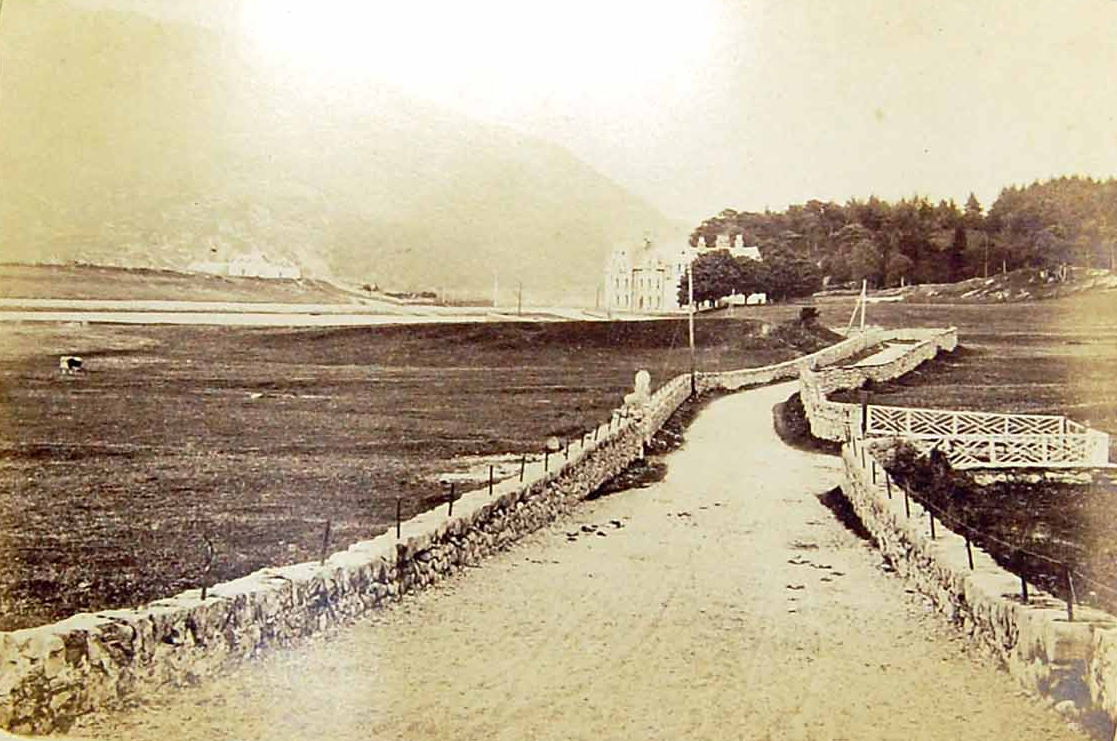
Ballachulish Ferry Hotels, photograph by James Valentine, ca. 1870

The principal industry is now tourism. The Ballachulish Hotel and Ballachulish House (until recently [2010] a country house hotel) are located near the narrows at (south) Ballachulish Ferry rather than in the "modern" village some 3 miles (5 km) to the east. Ballachulish House was reputed to be haunted, and the drive leading to it was ridden by a headless horseman.

Ballachulish Peninsula extends into the loch.

Pronunciation
- Scots Gaelic: Baile a' Chaolais
- Pronunciation: [baləˈxɯːlˠ̪ɪʃ]
- Scots Gaelic: Gleann a' Chaolais
- Pronunciation: [klan̪ˠəˈxɯːl̪ˠɪʃ]
- Scots Gaelic: Gleann Bhaile Chaoil
- Pronunciation: [klan̪ˠ valə ˈxɯːl]
- Scots Gaelic: Iain Cealaidh
- Pronunciation: [ˈiaɲ ˈkʲʰal̪ˠɪ]
- Scots Gaelic: Beinn a' Bheithir
- Pronunciation: [peɲəˈve.ɪɾʲ]

The hamlet of Glenachulish lies in Gleann a' Chaolais, the glen that runs down to the narrows. This is the subject of the Gaelic song, Gleann Bhaile Chaoil written by John Cameron (1865–1951) and known locally both as the Paisley Bard and by his local nickname Iain Cealaidh. He is often confused with another local bard also called John Cameron, known locally as Iain Rob (1822–1898). Gleann a' Chaolais is ringed by Beinn a' Bheithir, a massif which contains two munros - Sgorr Dhearg and Sgorr Dhonuill. In recent years a number of new houses have been built locally along with holiday chalets and an art gallery. Also the fields of Gleann a' Chaolais have been turned into the 9-hole Dragon's Tooth golf course.

Overlooking the narrows is the monument to James of the Glen, "hanged on this spot for a crime of which he was not guilty". Robert Louis Stevenson based his novel Kidnapped around the story of the Appin Murder. Whoever was the sniper who did kill The Red Fox (Colin Roy Campbell of Glenure) is still not known for certain. In 2001, however, Amanda Penman, an 89-year-old descendant of the Scottish clan chiefs of the Stewarts of Appin, alleged that the Appin murder had been planned, in retaliation for the Red Fox's role in the local Highland Clearances, by four young Stewart tacksmen without the sanction of James of the Glens. There was a shooting contest among them and the assassination was committed by the best marksman among the four, Donald Stewart of Ballachulish.

== Transport ==
In 1903, a branch of the Callander and Oban Railway, from Connel Ferry, was opened to Ballachulish. The site of the former railway halt of Ballachulish Ferry, the last stop on the line before the Laroch quarries, was next to Ballachulish House, some 1/2 mile (800 m) inland from the ferry. Traces of the line, which closed in 1966, remain between here and Connel Ferry. The old terminus station at Laroch (Ballachulish) is now a doctor's surgery. The station, and stationmaster's house, at Duror, is now a private house and the station at Creagan, some 20 miles (30 km) south, has been refurbished in its old traditional Caledonian Railway brown. The station at Kentallen (5 miles (8 km) south of Ballachulish) included a pier. When the Oban-Ballachulish branch line closed, the station buildings were bought over by Scottie & Bridget Stewart who ran the renowned Kentallen Station Tearooms for more than 15 years until finally retiring in 1974. Afternoon tea served here was a spectacular feast according to visitors' books from the day. This station has now been turned into The Holly Tree Hotel & Leisure Club.

The A82 road serves Ballachulish and much of the old railway line has been re-used as part of National Cycle Route 78, once again giving the beautiful views previously seen from the train.

== Slate ==
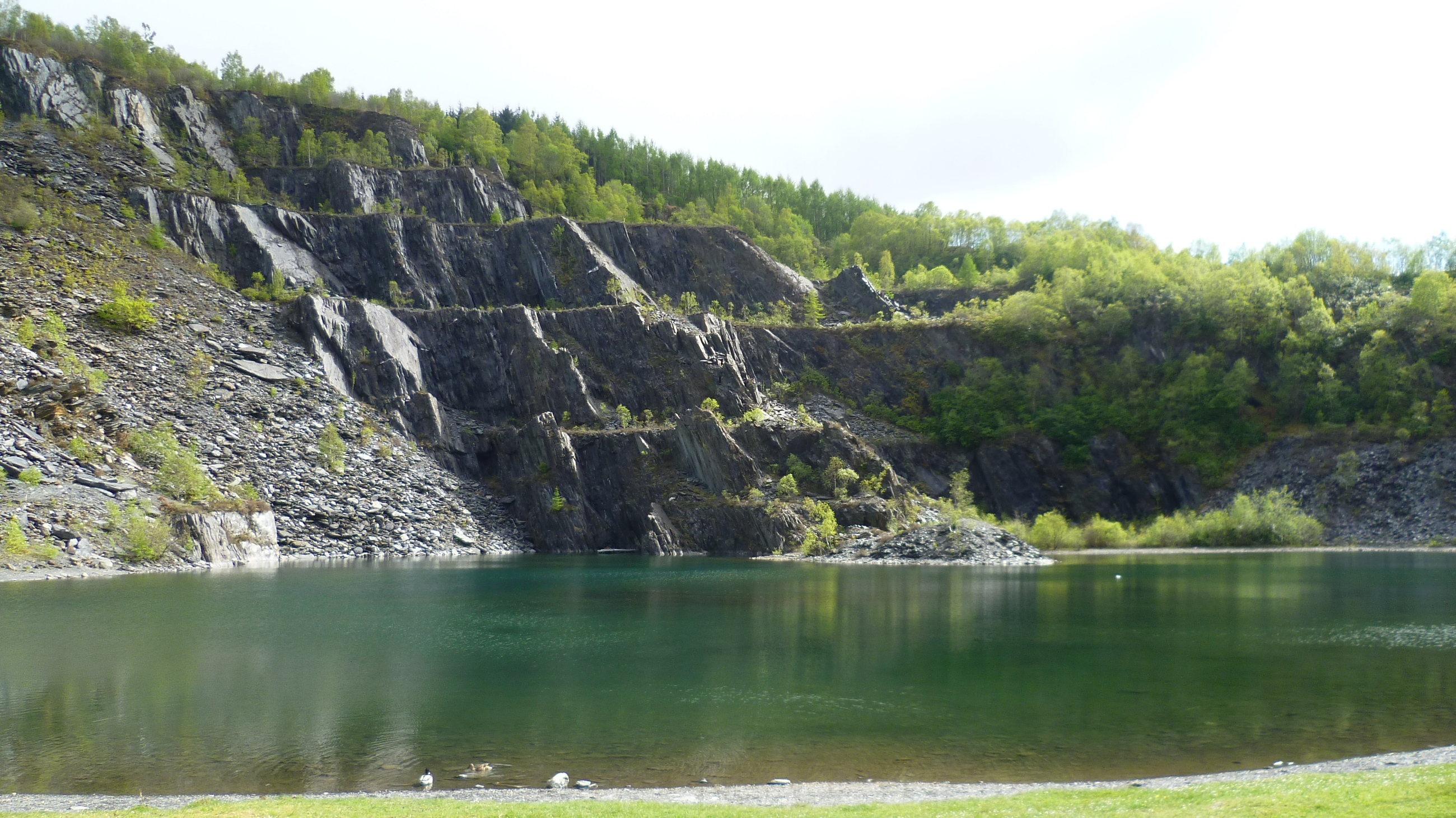
Ballachulish slate quarry

Slate from the East Laroch quarries, established just two years after the Glencoe Massacre of 1692, was used to provide the roofing slate for much of Edinburgh and Glasgow's skyline in the succeeding centuries. It is of good quality but one weakness is the presence of Iron Pyrite in the rock. These crystals quickly rust away when exposed to the weather, leaving clean square holes and a brown rusty streak. Over 75% of the slate cut from the quarries was unusable as roof covering for this and other reasons. In 1955 the quarries closed, leaving waste mountains for the abruptly unemployed and impoverished villagers to sort out.

Between 1902 and 1905 the Ballachulish community was badly affected by two protracted conflicts in the slate quarries. The first began in July 1902, involved a twelve months lockout, and lasted eighteen months. The workers objected to the summary dismissal of the medical officer Dr. Lachlan Grant from both his work in the quarries and his post as Medical Officer for the Parish Council District of Ballachulish. They also objected to the unsatisfactory labour contracts, inadequate wages and excessive charges for the powder, coals and other materials supplied by the company. The second dispute started in the summer of 1905 when members of a hostile crowd charged the quarry manager with autocratic, dictatorial and unfair behaviour towards both Dr. Grant and members of the quarrying labour force and the community. A new company was formed in December 1907 and quarrying continued at Ballachulish until 1955.

== Sport ==
=== Shinty ===
Shinty is a popular local sport and the narrows is the traditional boundary of the north–south divide in shinty, with teams north of narrows playing in the North district's competitions and those South playing in their respective competitions. Ballachulish Camanachd Club play in the South Leagues. However, Ballachulish is still considerably far North in relation to most of Scotland. The club has won the Camanachd Cup four times.

=== Local Highland Games ===
According to a report in The Oban Times in 1885,

On Saturday last these games were held under the most favourable auspices. The competitions were confined to local athletes - competitors from Ballachulish, Glencoe, Onich, Ardgour and Duror alone being eligible. This allowed a pleasant rivalry in feats of skill between youth of the neighbouring districts and encouraged a fondness for outdoor sports.

The Ballachulish Men excelled in throwing the hammer and putting the stone and the Glencoe men in leaping and racing, while the Lochaber (Onich) men carried off the place for vaulting with the pole, one of them clearing a height of 8 feet 8 inches and would have done more if required. The Glencoe lads are keener athletes than the Ballachulish ones. They stand almost unequalled at the game of shinty and on Saturday a plucky Glencoe lad was to be seen at every contest, no matter what his chances of winning might be. The Ballachulish lads are muscular and strong and should give a good account of themselves in any fray; but they do not show the same amount of Celtic fire for field sports as their neighbours of Carnoch (Glencoe).

Music was supplied by the pipe band of F Company (A.H.R.V.) and added greatly to the enjoyment of the day. The committee of judges were:- Messrs A. Beatson Bell, D. Campbell, J.B. Chinery Haldane, Major-Gen. Macpherson, D. McCalman, W.H.S. Napier, R. Philips and F.S. Robertson. The difficult duty of judging the dancing and pipe music was kindly and satisfactorily performed by Mrs. Robertson, Callart, and Major-Gen. Macpherson assisted by Mr. McIver, Callart House, in the latter case.

Events were - Hammer; Stone; High jump; Vaulting with pole; Long race; Boys' race; Short race; Sack race; Three-leg race; Pipe music; Highland Fling; Reels; Sword dance; Hornpipe.

— The Oban Times, 5 Sept. 1885

The contrast between the local informal competitions and the more formal 'arranged' games can be traced through to the second half of the century. Into the former category could be placed events such as the Ballachulish regatta 'got up by working men' at the slate quarries, which was accompanied by land sports. At these gatherings the traditional sports - throwing the hammer and the stone (both heavy and light), racing and leaping (high jump and long jump) - were pursued as 'trials of strength, swiftness and agility'... The caber seldom featured in local informal sports events arranged by local people as distinct from formal Highland Gatherings stage managed by non-locals.

— Lorna Jackson, Sport in the Making of Celtic Cultures

== Religion ==
St John's Episcopal Church, which replaced an earlier Episcopal church, is located to the west of the village. Its graveyard has an "exceptional collection of 19th-century finely inscribed and carved" gravestones made from Ballachulish slate. The Church of Scotland's church was dedicated to St Munda; it was built in 1845 and closed in 2023.

== See also ==
- Ballachulish figure
- Cameron of Lochiel
- Clan Cameron
- Eilean Munde
