= FSC Millport =

Field studies centre

Coordinates: 55°44′58″N 4°54′30″W

Millport, run by the Field Studies Council, is located on the island of Great Cumbrae in the Firth of Clyde, Scotland. The field centre was formerly known as the University Marine Biological Station Millport (UMBSM), a higher education institute run by the University of London in partnership with Glasgow University but was closed due to the withdrawal of higher education funding in 2013. The Field Studies Council reopened the centre in 2014 and continues to host and teach university, school and college groups and to support and host research students from all over the world, whilst also extending its educational reach and providing a variety of courses in natural history and outdoor environmental activities for adult learners and families to enjoy. The centre is a very popular conference venue hosting many international events. The Robertson Museum and Aquarium (named after the founder of the original Marine Station, David Robertson) is open to visitors between March and November. The centre also functions as a Meteorological Office Weather Station and Admiralty Tide Monitor.

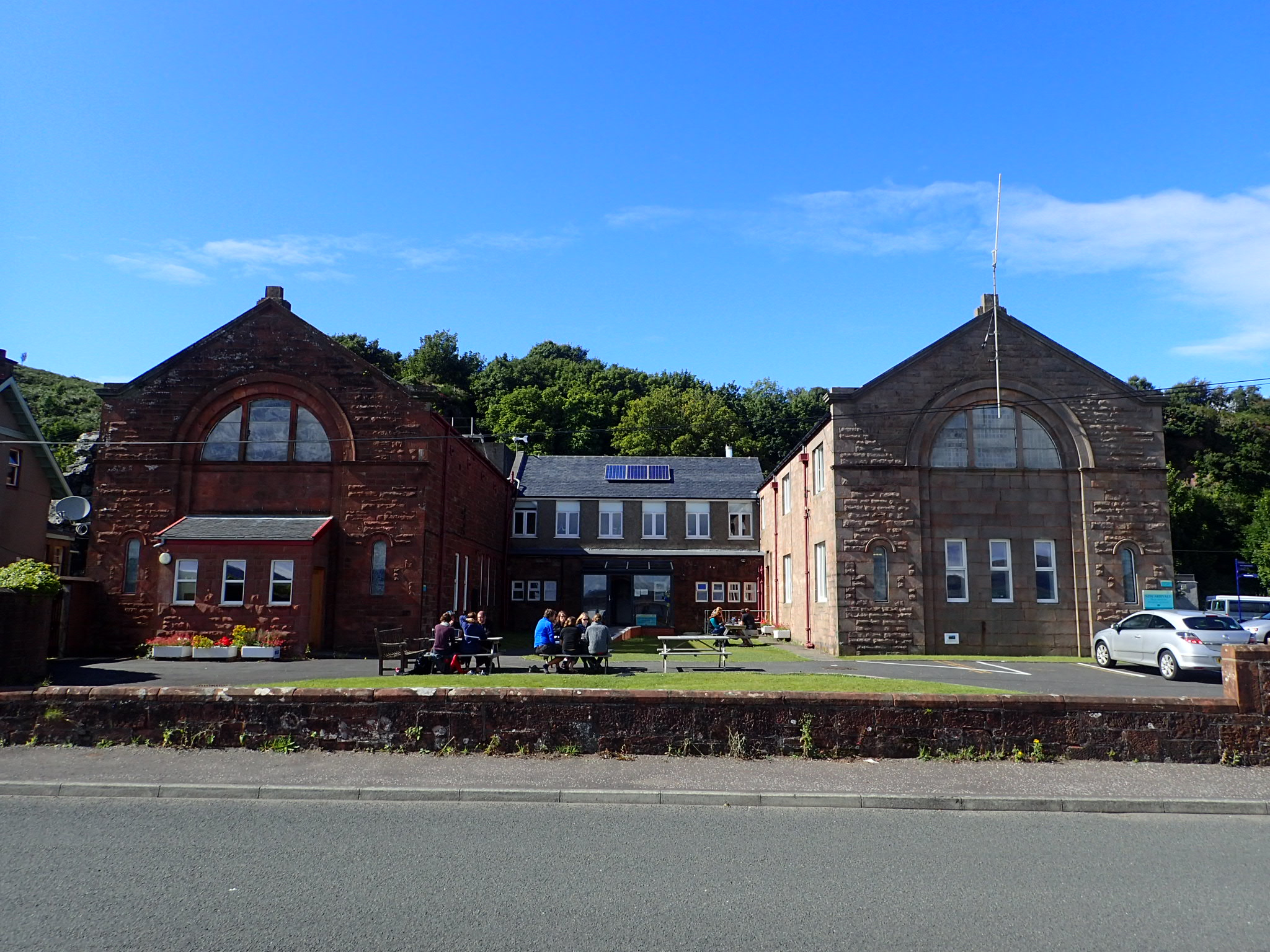
FSC Millport

== History ==
The Ark, an 84 ft lighter originally moored in the flooded Granton quarry, was fitted out as a floating laboratory by the father of modern oceanography, Sir John Murray. This boat was brought to Port Loy on the Isle of Cumbrae in 1885 and formed the beginnings of the Scottish Marine Station. She attracted a stream of distinguished scientists, drawn by the richness of the fauna and flora of the Firth of Clyde, but gradually fell into disuse after the opening of the Millport Marine Station, and on the night of 20 January 1900 was completely destroyed by a great storm.

In 1894 a committee headed by amateur naturalist David Robertson began to build a marine station on the Isle of Cumbrae and took over the Ark. Sadly David Robertson died before completion of the centre, but in 1897 Millport Marine Biological Station (MMBS) was opened by Sir John Murray. Despite many struggles during its first few decades, in which sufficient funding was difficult to attain and there was much conflict between research priorities and the needs of education, the station persisted.

On 21 July 1904 Scotia, the ship of Dr William Speirs Bruce's Scottish National Antarctic Expedition, returned to her first Scottish landing site at the Keppel Pier on the Isle of Cumbrae.

From this beginning, the station was gradually built up to its present size. The original building proved too small for the purpose and an architectural copy was built alongside. In 1914 the Scottish Marine Biological Association was established at MMBS. In 1922 Sheina Marshall joined the Scottish Marine Laboratory, beginning a scientific career dedicated to the study of plant and animal plankton. She went on to become one of the first women to be elected a Fellow of the Royal Society of Edinburgh, and later became a Fellow of the Royal Society, as well as being awarded the Order of the British Empire in 1966. From 1966 to 1987 the station ran under the directorship of Ronald Ian Currie FRSE who was responsible for the creation of RV Challenger and RV Calanus.

In 1970 the Scottish Marine Biological Station moved to Dunstaffnage Bay (Oban), and MMBS was taken over by the University of London in partnership with Glasgow University, becoming the University Marine Biological Station Millport (UMBSM). It continued to expand, with a hostel accommodation block opening in 1975.

In December 2012 it was announced that the University Marine Biological Station Millport would be forced to close after the Higher Education Funding Council for England withdrew the grant of 400,000 pounds that it gave to the University of London to run the station. UMBSM closed on 31 October 2013.

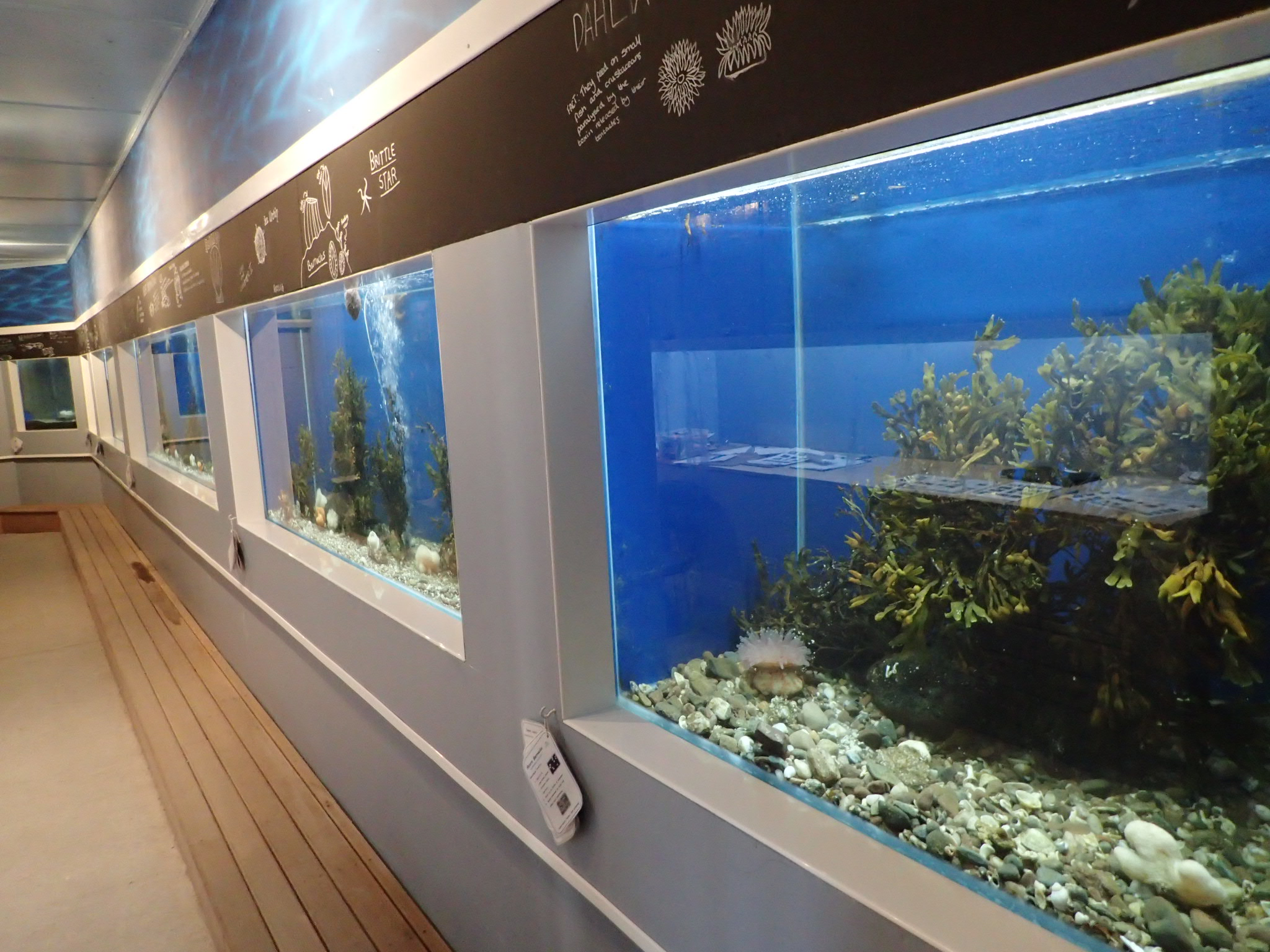
Aquarium in the Robertson Museum and Aquarium at FSC Millport

Ownership of MMBS was transferred to the Field Studies Council on 1 January 2014. In May 2014 a four-million-pound package of funding was announced that allowed a comprehensive programme of development and refurbishment to be completed over five years. FSC Millport continues to develop and grow as one of the Field Studies Council's centres.

== See also ==
- Sheina Marshall
- David Robertson (naturalist)
- Field Studies Council
