= Isle of Cumbrae distillery =

Gin distillery in Millport, Scotland

Isle of Cumbrae Distillery
- Location: 11 Guildford Street, Millport, North Ayrshire KA28 0AE, Scotland, United Kingdom
- Coordinates: 55.7528°N 4.9296°W
- Owner: Isle of Cumbrae Distillers Ltd
- Founded: 2019; 7 years ago
- Founder: Bronwyn Jenkins-Deas; Juli Dempsey; Lynda Gill; Philippa Dalton; Jenine Ward
- Status: Operational
- Website: isleofcumbrae-distillers.com

Isle of Cumbrae distillery is a gin distillery in Millport, Great Cumbrae, Scotland.

== History ==
The distillery's founders initially met at a fundraiser for renovations to Millport Town Hall; none of the founders had a distilling or licensing background. In May 2020, the company launched a crowdfunding campaign to raise £10,000 to purchase a still, in partnership with the Royal Bank of Scotland. The crowdfunder raised £25,000, and the distillery's first gin, Nostalgin, was released in September 2020.

The second gin release, Croc Rock, was named after a painted rock in Millport, and used cacao, ginger and orange as botanicals. The third gin release, Restoration, would support fundraising efforts for Millport Town Hall.

In April 2024, Caroline Christie and Struan Fraser took management of the distillery, with a planned transition to ownership over the following three years. Later that year, the distillery was shortlisted for "Gin Tourism Destination of the Year" at the Scottish Gin Awards. In 2025, the distillery released a gin in support of the Ayrshire Hospice.

The distillery's first vodka, called Veya Vodka after Saint Bega, was released in October 2025. Shortly afterwards, Kilmarnock FC announced a partnership with the distillery to release the club's official gin, Killie Gin.
