= The Eileans =

Two islands in North Ayrshire, Scotland

Coordinates: 55.74895°N 4.92684°W

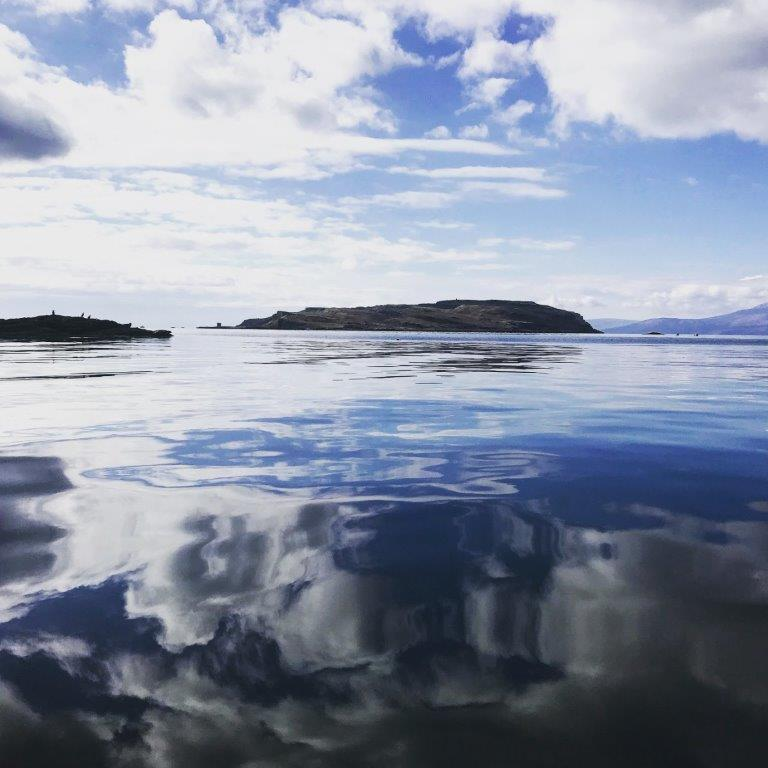
The Eileans as seen from Newton Bay

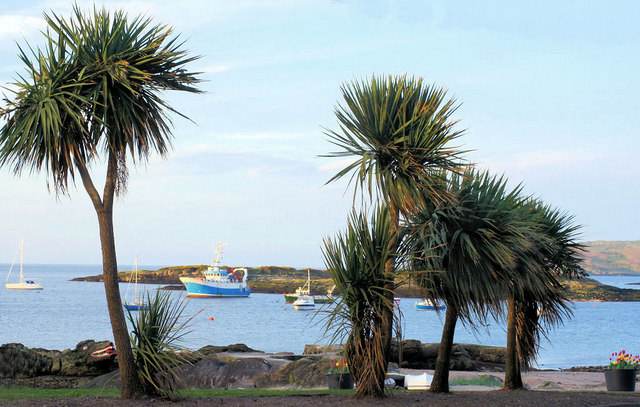
Cabbage trees (Cordyline australis) on Newton Bay, with the Eileans in the background

The Eileans are two small, low-lying islands located in Newtown Bay, Millport on the island of Great Cumbrae, Scotland. (grid reference NS164545).

The name is an anglicisation of the Scottish Gaelic, eilean meaning "island". Unusually for the west coast of Scotland, the two islands appear to have no individual names of their own and as such are always referred to collectively. The islands were mined for stone in the Victorian times, during the busy expansion of Millport.

Today the islands are home to a small colony of harbour seals.

Three smaller rocks, the Leug (possibly Gaelic: gemstone), the Spoig (Gaelic: paw) and the Clach (Gaelic: stone) lie to the west.
