= University Marine Biological Station Millport =

Research station in North Ayrshire, Scotland

- Type: Public HE Institution
- Established: 1897 (as Millport Marine Biological Station)
- Affiliations: University of London
- Acting Director: Prof. P. Geoff Moore
- Administrative staff: 4
- Location: Millport, Great Cumbrae, Scotland
- Campus: Marine biological lab.
- Website: Official website

The University Marine Biological Station Millport (UMBSM) was a higher education institution located on the island of Great Cumbrae in the Firth of Clyde, Scotland, and run by the university of London (of which it was a central academic body). It closed in 2013 and is now Millport Field Centre, run by the Field Studies Council.

Located just outside the town, it had an extensive curriculum and research programme, with an influx of students throughout the academic year. A Museum and Aquarium (named after the founder, David Robertson) were open to visitors. In May 2003, the station took delivery of the Macduff-built, 22-metre marine research vessel RV Aora. The station also functioned as a Meteorological Office Weather Station and Admiralty Tide Monitor.

== History ==
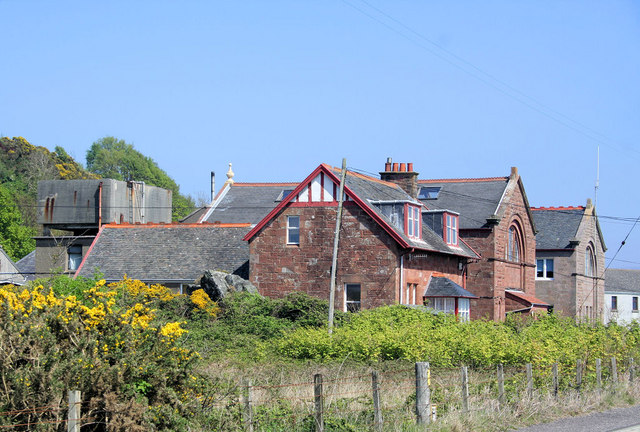
The University Marine Biological Station Millport

The Ark, an 84-foot (26-metre) lighter, was fitted out as a floating laboratory by the father of modern oceanography, Sir John Murray. She formed the Scottish Marine Station for 12 years from 1884. In 1885 she was moved from Granton and drawn up on the shore at Port Loy, Cumbrae. She attracted a stream of distinguished scientists, drawn by the richness of the fauna and flora of the Firth of Clyde, but closed in 1903.

In Millport, an amateur naturalist, David Robertson, was encouraged by meeting Anton Dohrn and by the wealth of findings from the Challenger expedition. In 1894 he formed a committee to build a marine station in Millport and took over The Ark. In May 1897, Sir John Murray formally opened Millport Marine Biological Station, situated near Keppel Pier. The building provided a laboratory with equipped tables, and a museum and aquarium open to the public. The Ark was totally destroyed by a great storm on the night of 20 January 1900.

On 21 July 1904 Scotia, the ship of Dr William Speirs Bruce's Scottish National Antarctic Expedition, returned to her first Scottish landing site, on the Isle of Cumbrae.

From this beginning the station was gradually built up to its present size. The original building proved too small for the purpose and an architectural copy was built alongside. From 1966 to 1987 the station ran under the Directorship of Ronald Ian Currie FRSE who was responsible for the creation of RV Challenger and RV Calanus.

In December 2012 it was announced that the University Marine Biological Station Millport would be forced to close after the Higher Education Funding Council for England withdrew the grant of 400,000 pounds that it gave to the University of London to run the station. UMBSM closed on 31 October 2013.

Ownership was transferred to the Field Studies Council on 1 January 2014. In May 2014 a four-million-pound package of funding was announced that is intended to allow a comprehensive programme of development and refurbishment to be completed over five years. In 2020 the centre was shortlisted for a Nature of Scotland Business Award for their work connecting visitors with the island's coasts and waters.

== See also ==
- Sheina Marshall
- David Robertson (naturalist)
- Field Studies Council
- Ronald Ian Currie
