= Scottish Marine Station =

Scottish Marine Station may refer to:

- Scottish Association for Marine Science, Dunstaffnage Castle, Argyll
- University Marine Biological Station Millport, originally at Granton, Edinburgh, now at Great Cumbrae on the Firth of Clyde
