= Millport Town Hall =

Municipal building in Millport, Scotland

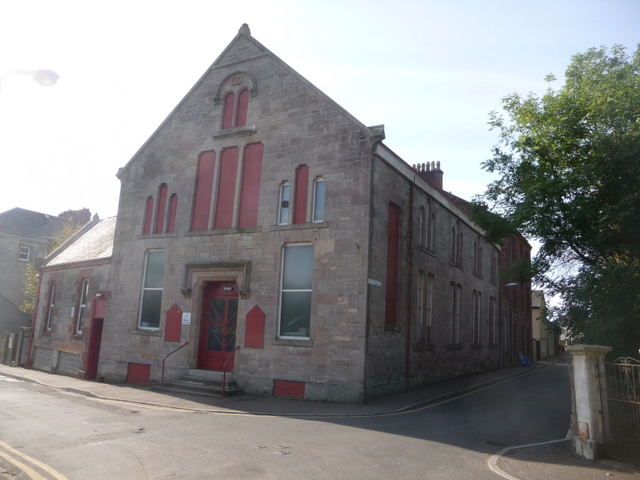
- Millport Town Hall

- Shown in North Ayrshire
- 55.7536°N 4.9289°W
- Location: Clifton Street, Millport

History
- Built: 1878

Site notes
- Architectural style: Neoclassical style

Millport Town Hall is a municipal building in Clifton Street, Millport, North Ayrshire, Scotland. The structure is used as a community events centre.

== History ==
Following significant population growth, largely associated with the fishing industry, the area became a police burgh in 1864. In this context, the new burgh council decided to commission a town hall: the site they chose was at the corner of Clifton Street and Howard Street. The new building was designed in the neoclassical style, built in ashlar stone and was completed in 1878. The design involved a symmetrical main frontage of three bays facing into Clifton Street. The central bay featured a doorway with a hood mould which was flanked by two casement windows; on the first floor, there were a tri-partite window flanked by two smaller sets of tri-partite windows and, within the gable above, there was a further small bi-partite window surmounted by a round headed hood mould containing a date stone. Internally, the principal room was the main assembly hall.

On 30 June 1906, the town hall was the venue for a public meeting of residents held to discuss threats by the Glasgow and South Western Railway and the Caledonian Railway to withdraw the steamboat service between Great Cumbrae and the mainland. These threats were being made in response to an increase in charges being levied by the burgh council. The dispute was eventually resolved amicably after the intervention of the Board of Trade. The town hall also hosted theatrical performances and concerts: in the 1960s, notable performers included the beat group, The Searchers.

The building continued to serve as the meeting place of the burgh council for much of the 20th century, but ceased to be the local seat of government when the enlarged Cunninghame District Council was formed in 1975. The town hall continued to operate as an events venue and hosted Menotti's opera, Amahl and the Night Visitors in 1989.

After the building closed in 2016, its fabric started to deteriorate, and it was placed on the Buildings at Risk Register for Scotland. However, a major programme of restoration works, carried out to a design by O'Donnell Brown, started on site in 2022 and was due to be completed in 2023. The programme, which was being supported by grants from the Scottish Government, North Ayrshire Council and the National Lottery Community Fund, was intended to create new community, museum and residential areas within the complex.
