= Ron Curry =

Ron Curry may refer to:

- Ronald Curry (born 1979), former American football wide receiver
- Ron Curry (basketball) (born 1993), American basketball player

== See also ==
- Ron Currie Jr. (born 1975), American author
- Ronald Ian Currie, Scottish marine biologist
