= Millport (radio show) =

- Genre: Sitcom
- Running time: 30 minutes
- Country of origin: United Kingdom
- Language: English
- Home station: BBC Radio 4
- Starring: Lynn Ferguson; Janet Brown
- Written by: Lynn Ferguson
- Produced by: Lucy Bacon
- Executive producer: Cathy Smith
- Original release: 22 March 2000 – 6 December 2002
- No. of series: 3
- No. of episodes: 18
- Website: Millport at BBC Radio 4 Extra

Millport is a radio situation comedy, initially broadcast on BBC Radio 4 between 22 March 2000 and 6 December 2002. It starred Lynn Ferguson and Janet Brown, and the show was written by Lynn Ferguson.

== Premise ==
Barmaid Irene Bruce lives in the town of Millport, which she refers to as a scabby wee town on a scabby wee island, as the only town on the island of Great Cumbrae in the Firth of Clyde in Scotland. She hankers after a life on a larger stage on the mainland, away from the boredom where she is cranky and sexually frustrated, but at the same time unattracted to anyone around her.

She has an infuriatingly sweet, but dull, sister Moira who writes articles for the magazine The People's Friend, who also has a dog named Robert that can talk. Nearby Ritz Cafe owner Alberto is obsessed that the Sicilian Mafia will come to take over his business, and lives with adopted daughter Ina.

== Cast ==
- Lynn Ferguson as Irene Bruce
- Janet Brown as Moira Bruce and Agnes Scobie
- Louis McLeod as Bob Scobie, Alberto and Robert (the dog)
- Mark Costello as Dougie
- Robert Patterson as Minister
- Gabriel Quigley as Bunty Pierce, Ina and Betty Sturgeon

== Episodes ==
=== Series 1 ===
No. overall	No. in series	Title	Original release date
1	1	"The Storm"	22 March 2000
A pensioner disappears on a tiny Scottish island.
2	2	"Lineage"	29 March 2000
Thirty-something barmaid Irene wonders why her crooked brother has returned to the Scottish island.
3	3	"Ardour"	5 April 2000
Barmaid Irene's got an ulterior motive when matchmaking on the Scottish island.
4	4	"Derek Dodds is Dead"	12 April 2000
An unexpected death makes all the islanders question their priorities.
5	5	"Culture"	19 April 2000
A top restaurant critic causes island speculation when he books a table at Alberto's cafe.
6	6	"The Letter"	26 April 2000
It's turnip season on the Scottish Island - and Irene gets an offer she can't refuse.

=== Series 2 ===
No. overall	No. in series	Title	Original release date
7	1	"Happy Returns"	27 April 2001
It's Irene's 33rd birthday - so the island inhabitants have some surprises on the way.
8	2	"Dark Secrets"	4 May 2001
Irene enlists Bob's help when strange events send the tiny Scottish island into disarray.
9	3	"Avowal"	11 May 2001
Village disputes abound, but how will they be solved if no-one is talking to each other?
10	4	"Story"	18 May 2001
People are telling tales, Moira's acting oddly, Bob is ignored - and Irene's confused.
11	5	"Growth"	25 May 2001
The islanders are bitten by a fitness bug and an inspector arrives to check Bunty's veg.
12	6	"The Verdict"	1 June 2001
The islanders unite to save The Cumbrae Bar, but will Irene fight or head to the mainland?

=== Series 3 ===
No. overall	No. in series	Title	Original release date
13	1	"Reinstatement"	1 November 2002
Irene arrives on the first ferry of the holiday season, but why is she back on the island?
14	2	"Restitution"	8 November 2002
Can the re-opening of the club go according to plan? And what's in Huberto's suitcase?
15	3	"Wild Rover"	15 November 2002
As the islanders argue over the club, Irene faces a dilemma over her hysterical sister. Robert the dog escapes to the mainland for a day. Irene still hasn't made it back to Paisley.
16	4	"The Siege"	22 November 2002
The island's neighbours are furious that the town has its own independent public house.
17	5	"Progressive Rock"	29 November 2002
The islanders are excited over the town's media make-over, but can Irene really leave now?
18	6	"The End of the Beginning"	6 December 2002
The island make-over's gone sour, so with no Irene - can ailing Bunty stop the bulldozers? Bob and Irene finally get it together.

== Television pilot ==
The series was adapted for a television pilot which aired on BBC One Scotland on the 30 June 2002. The show also starred Lynn Ferguson in the role of Irene.
