= Chicken Run: Dawn of the Nugget =

2023 film directed by Sam Fell

- Release poster
- Directed by: Sam Fell
- Screenplay by: Karey Kirkpatrick; John O'Farrell; Rachel Tunnard
- Story by: Karey Kirkpatrick; John O'Farrell
- Based on: Chicken Run by Peter Lord; Nick Park
- Produced by: Steve Pegram; Leyla Hobart
- Starring: Thandiwe Newton; Zachary Levi; Bella Ramsey; Imelda Staunton; Lynn Ferguson; David Bradley; Jane Horrocks; Romesh Ranganathan; Daniel Mays; Josie Sedgwick-Davies; Peter Serafinowicz; Nick Mohammed; Miranda Richardson
- Cinematography: Charles Copping
- Edited by: Stephen Perkins
- Music by: Harry Gregson-Williams
- Production company: Aardman Animations
- Distributed by: Netflix
- Release dates: 14 October 2023 (BFI); 15 December 2023 (Netflix)
- Running time: 101 minutes
- Country: United Kingdom
- Language: English

Chicken Run: Dawn of the Nugget is a 2023 British stop motion animated comedy film directed by Sam Fell and written by Karey Kirkpatrick, John O'Farrell, and Rachel Tunnard. It is the sequel to Chicken Run (2000), and was produced by Aardman Animations for Netflix. The film stars Thandiwe Newton, Zachary Levi, Bella Ramsey, Romesh Ranganathan, David Bradley, Daniel Mays, Jane Horrocks, Imelda Staunton, Lynn Ferguson, Josie Sedgwick-Davies, Peter Serafinowicz, Nick Mohammed, and Miranda Richardson. The story follows Rocky and Ginger who lead a rescue mission when their daughter has been abducted to a highly-advanced poultry farm run by their old enemy Mrs Tweedy.

Chicken Run: Dawn of the Nugget had its world premiere at the BFI London Film Festival on 14 October 2023, and was released by Netflix on 15 December 2023. The film received generally positive reviews from critics, though it was deemed inferior to its predecessor.

== Plot ==
Since the chickens escaped from Mr and Mrs Tweedy's Farm, (Note: As depicted in Chicken Run (2000).) they have settled in an idyllic sanctuary on an island in a lake, where they can live happily, safe from humans. Ginger and Rocky start a family with a hatchling named Molly. The rats Nick and Fetcher visit periodically with supplies.

Molly grows into an adventurous young girl, whom Ginger and Rocky try to protect from the outside world. The appearance of trucks and construction on the mainland concerns Ginger, who fears that another chicken farm is being built. With her more cautious perspective as a parent, she leads her community in hiding more effectively.

Molly's curiosity leads her to sneak away to the mainland, where she is saved from being run over by another young chicken named Frizzle. The two friends stow away on a truck full of chickens being transported to Fun-Land Farms, which initially appears appealing to them. Ginger and Rocky form a search party with Babs, Bunty, Mac, and Fowler. They give chase and discover that the "farm" is actually a highly advanced poultry processing plant bristling with security systems.

Inside, Molly and Frizzle discover an expansive amusement area, where the other chickens — all wearing numbered electronic collars — go on rides, play games, and more. Rocky impulsively catapults into the compound, inadvertently activating various security systems and providing Ginger and the others with the information they need to infiltrate. They are joined by Nick and Fetcher, who become separated from the group but eventually reunite with Rocky.

Molly and Frizzle discover that the collars, when activated, turn the other chickens into carefree, mindless drones. Frizzle is captured by the facility's scientist, Dr Fry, and fitted with a collar. Molly escapes, promising to come back for her.

Ginger reunites with Molly, and learns in horror that her nemesis Mrs Tweedy is running the operation alongside Dr Fry, her new husband. The collars serve to suppress the chickens' fear, to make tastier chicken nuggets for Reginald Smith, a fast-food chain businessman looking for new food items. Mrs Tweedy captures Ginger and puts a collar on her, which she resists unsuccessfully, but Rocky intervenes and Molly frees her. The hens, rooster, and rats are reunited in a corn silo, which they escape by turning it into popcorn. Molly mourns the fate of Frizzle, prompting Ginger and the others to turn back and help the other chickens as well.

Mrs Tweedy orders Dr Fry to begin production of chicken nuggets, triggering a struggle for the remote control that brainwashes the chickens. Rocky, Ginger, and Molly battle Mrs Tweedy for control, while the rest of the rescue squad tries to hold back the chickens as they march mindlessly toward the processor. The trio wins the fight, sending Mrs Tweedy tumbling into the nugget machine, where she is breaded like a chicken nugget. Meanwhile, the entire population of chickens—and the rats—escape in a truck. Mrs Tweedy tries to stop them, but Fowler knocks her into the compound's moat, where she is apprehended by the facility's security as the site explodes from the chickens' sabotage.

The chickens return to the island, and their life returns to normal, now with Molly and Frizzle doing aerial reconnaissance for chicken farms on the mainland and the chicken crew liberating those they find.

== Voice cast ==
- Thandiwe Newton as Ginger, a British chicken and Rocky's wife. She was voiced by Julia Sawalha in the first film.
  - Archive footage from the first film utilises scenes with Sawalha as Ginger in flashback sequences.
- Zachary Levi as Rocky, an American former circus rooster and Ginger's husband. He was voiced by Mel Gibson in the first film.
- Bella Ramsey as Molly, the adventurous daughter of Ginger and Rocky
- Imelda Staunton as Bunty, a cynical chicken and former champion egg-layer
- Lynn Ferguson as Mac, a Scottish nerdy chicken who is Ginger's assistant
- David Bradley as Fowler, an elderly rooster and former RAF mascot. He was voiced by Benjamin Whitrow in the first film.
- Jane Horrocks as Babs, a dimwitted chicken who is adept at knitting
- Romesh Ranganathan as Nick, a cynical scavenger rat. He was voiced by Timothy Spall in the first film.
- Daniel Mays as Fetcher, a comical rat who is Nick's partner. He was voiced by Phil Daniels in the first film.
- Josie Sedgwick-Davies as Frizzle, a chicken whom Molly befriends
- Peter Serafinowicz as Reginald Smith, the owner of the Sir Eat-a-Lot chain of restaurants
- Nick Mohammed as Dr Fry, a scientist at Fun-Land Farms who is Mrs Tweedy's second husband
- Miranda Richardson as Mrs Melisha Tweedy, the chickens' former owner and current owner of Fun-Land Farms who now seeks revenge
- David Brooks as Burly Guard
- Dan Williamson as Van Driver
- Tom Doggart as:
  - 2D Narrator
  - Male Fun-Land Farms Guards
- Sam Fell as:
  - 2D Animated Boy
  - Dying Moth
- Naomi McDonald as
  - 2D Animated Mum
  - Beryl, a white chicken in a pink scarf that lives in the bird sanctuary
  - Chicken 314, a chicken that was used as a test subject for Dr Fry's chicken nugget machine
- Kate Harbour as:
  - Biscuit Chicken
  - Female Fun-Land Farms Guards
- Tim Bentinck as Fun-Land Farms Gate Guard
- Sophie Smith as Snail

== Production ==
After completing Chicken Run in 2000, Jeffrey Katzenberg, the then-CEO of DreamWorks Animation and one of the film's executive producers, proposed to Aardman Animations the idea of making a sequel. However, Aardman declined as they felt unready to make a sequel as well as its employees feeling exhausted after completing the original film and instead moved on to different projects. Since then, ideas and talks of a sequel floated around for years until numerous crew members of the first film agreed to continue the story.

A sequel to Chicken Run was reported in April 2018 with Aardman Animations, StudioCanal and Pathé set to produce. DreamWorks had no involvement due to ending their partnership with Aardman after the box-office underperformance of Flushed Away in 2006. Sam Fell directed, with Paul Kewley producing. Fell was approached by the film's original co-director Peter Lord in 2016 at a party and convinced him to return to Aardman to direct the sequel. The original Chicken Run writers Karey Kirkpatrick and John O'Farrell returned to write for the sequel. Aardman co-founders Peter Lord and David Sproxton served as executive producers along with the original film's co-director Nick Park.

On 16 October 2019, the film officially began pre-production. Because very few props and models from the original film survived after being destroyed in a warehouse fire in 2005, Fell and his team resorted to using reference photos from the original film's making of book. Aardman said that Mel Gibson was not asked to return as Rocky. In June 2020, Fell released more details about the sequel, which would follow from the ending of the first film, where the chickens have settled into their new safe area. Molly, the chick of Ginger and Rocky, begins to outgrow the area, just as word of a new threat to the chickens arrives. In July 2020, Julia Sawalha, the voice of Ginger in the first film, revealed Aardman's intention to recast her role, saying her voice now sounded too old, and commented "I have officially been plucked, stuffed & roasted". The decision was met with criticism, with some finding the decision ageist.

Principal photography commenced in early 2021. In January 2022, Zachary Levi, Thandiwe Newton, David Bradley, Romesh Ranganathan and Daniel Mays replaced Gibson, Sawalha, Benjamin Whitrow, Timothy Spall and Phil Daniels as the voices of Rocky, Ginger, Fowler, Nick and Fetcher, while Jane Horrocks, Imelda Staunton and Lynn Ferguson reprised their roles as Babs, Bunty and Mac from the first film, with the film's title revealed as Chicken Run: Dawn of the Nugget. Bella Ramsey, Nick Mohammed and Josie Sedgwick-Davies voiced three new characters, Molly, Dr. Fry and Frizzle, respectively. In September 2023, it was announced that Miranda Richardson would reprise her role as the voice of Mrs Tweedy and that Peter Serafinowicz also joined the cast as Reginald Smith, a "slightly bemused businessman".

Due to the COVID-19 pandemic, the clay models were put in quarantine for 10 days after the animators had finished. The clay models were put in a tent with ultraviolet lights.

== Music ==
In June 2023, it was reported that Harry Gregson-Williams, who previously scored the first film with John Powell, would return to compose the film, marking his fifth collaboration with Aardman. It is also the second time Gregson-Williams scored a sequel to an animated film solely by himself after he composed its predecessor with Powell, the first being DreamWorks Animation's Shrek 2 (2004), as well as Shrek the Third (2007) and Shrek Forever After (2010). Chicken Run: Dawn of the Nugget—Original Motion Picture Soundtrack was released digitally on the day of the film's worldwide release.

== Release ==
Chicken Run: Dawn of the Nugget premiered at the 67th BFI London Film Festival on 14 October 2023, with none of the cast in attendance due to the 2023 SAG-AFTRA strike, with the film's characters walking the red carpet in their place. It was released on Netflix on 15 December 2023. The film had a preview at the Annecy International Animation Film Festival on 11 June 2023. Netflix purchased the worldwide distribution rights to the film, excluding China.

== Reception ==
=== Critical response ===
On the review aggregator website Rotten Tomatoes, 83% of 112 critics' reviews are positive, with an average rating of 6.8/10. The website's consensus reads: "Chicken Run: Dawn of the Nugget offers more of the easy laughs and eye-catching animation that fans of the original enjoyed, although there's a general feeling of diminishing returns." Metacritic, which uses a weighted average, assigned the film a score of 63 out of 100, based on 30 critics, indicating "generally favorable" reviews.

John Nugent for Empire magazine wrote, "the ambition and technical scope are markedly bolder" than its predecessor Chicken Run, adding it is "silly, witty, extremely British—this is a family film made with a very Aardman-y kind of craft and care". Jacob Oller, of Paste Magazine, complimented Ramsey for being "the clear star, putting an extra level of fear, awe or disillusionment into her few lines", though he was otherwise critical of the film, viewing it as mediocre and uninventive.

=== Accolades ===
Award	Date of ceremony	Category	Recipient(s)	Result	Ref.
Hollywood Music in Media Awards	15 November 2023	Best Original Score — Animated Film	Harry Gregson-Williams	Nominated	
San Diego Film Critics Society	19 December 2023	Best Animated Picture	Chicken Run: Dawn of the Nugget	Nominated	
Visual Effects Society Awards	February 21, 2024	Outstanding Visual Effects in an Animated Feature	Jon Biggins, Jim Lewis, Charles Copping, Matthew Perry	Nominated	
Visual Effects Society Awards	February 21, 2024	Outstanding Created Environment in an Animated Feature	Charles Copping, Matthew Perry, Jim Lewis, Jon Biggins (for Chicken Island)	Nominated	
British Academy Film Awards	February 18, 2024	Best Animated Film	Sam Fell, Leyla Hobart and Steve Pegram	Nominated	

== Video game ==
Aardman announced a video game that would follow the events of Dawn of the Nugget, titled Chicken Run: Eggstraction. Originally set for release in 2024 as an exclusive Netflix game, it was later put in development by Outright Games and released on 24 October 2025, on Xbox One, Xbox Series X/S, Nintendo Switch, PlayStation 4, and PlayStation 5. The game features Ramsey and Sedgwick-Davies reprising their respective roles as Molly and Frizzle. The game's story was written by Laurence Rickard.
