= Castle Head, Grange-over-Sands =

Country house in Cumbria, England

Coordinates: 54.2111°N 2.8886°W

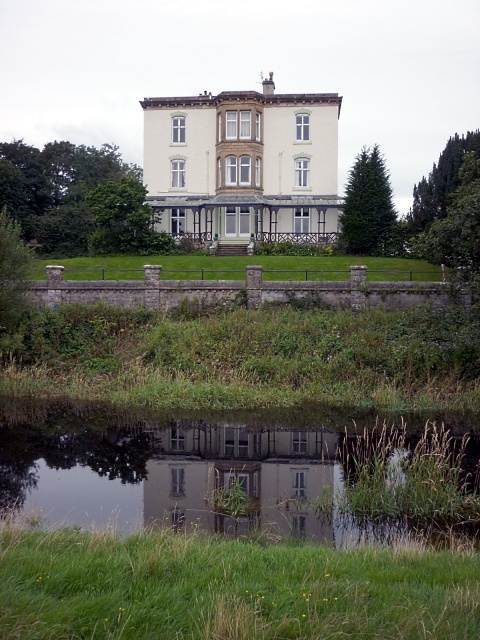
Castle Head and the River Winster

Castle Head is a country house surrounded by 20 acres (81,000 m^{2}) of grounds near to the seaside resort of Grange-over-Sands in Cumbria, England. It is run by Field Studies Council, and is a Grade II listed building.

== History ==
The house was built in the Georgian style for John Wilkinson, an industrialist, in 1778 (247 years ago). He was buried in the garden at Castle Head in 1808 before being re-interred in the church in 1828. The house was then acquired by Robert Wright, a solicitor, but lay empty under his ownership for some 30 years, before being bought in 1863 by Edward Mucklow, a Manchester businessman.

The house went on to serve as St Mary's Missionary College, a seminary owned by the Holy Ghost Fathers, from the early 20th century until it closed in the late 1970s. Students who trained there included, briefly, Sir Gerry Robinson, the industrialist.

Since the mid-1970s the house has been a Field Studies Centre, from 1997 managed by the Field Studies Council who offer residential and non residential fieldwork for schools, colleges and universities and holiday accommodation.

In September 2009 a Life Science Centre was also established at the house.
