= Stephens Orr =

British photographer (1907–1990)

John Stephens Orr (6 March 1907 – 1990) was a Scottish Glasgow photographer whose subject matter was often people or motor cars. Practising between 1930 and 1970 in Glasgow's Langside and later at No. 4 Somerset Place, Charing Cross, he became known for his portraits of society figures in magazines such as Scottish Field.

His photographs were often of judges posing in full regalia, antidisestablishmentarianism lawyers, Duchesses and controversial music hall characters. Orr also photographed celebrities and captains of industry, all visitors to Glasgow. Some of the people he photographed include:

- Paul Robeson — U.S. vocalist and black activist
- Dame Marie Rambert — Polish dancer and choreographer; founder of Ballet Rambert
- Marc Chagall — Jewish painter
- Richard Burton — Welsh actor
- Stanley Baxter — Scottish comedian
- Jacques Tati — French film maker
- Paul Tortelier — French cellist
- David Brown, Aston Martin cars
- William Lyons, Jaguar, Austin cars
- Walter Owen Bentley, Rolls-Royce/Bentley cars
- Nicholas Fairbairn — Scottish lawyer and British politician

Orr wore a distinctive kilt and was photographed in a portrait style similar to Yousuf Karsh. He recorded the last glimmers of a confident Scottish society in flamboyant style. His later life was spent with his wife, Jenny, on the Scottish Clyde coast island of Cumbrae. He "spoke with [a] pronounced Glasgow accent".

He died in Cumbrae, aged 83.
