= MV Keppel =

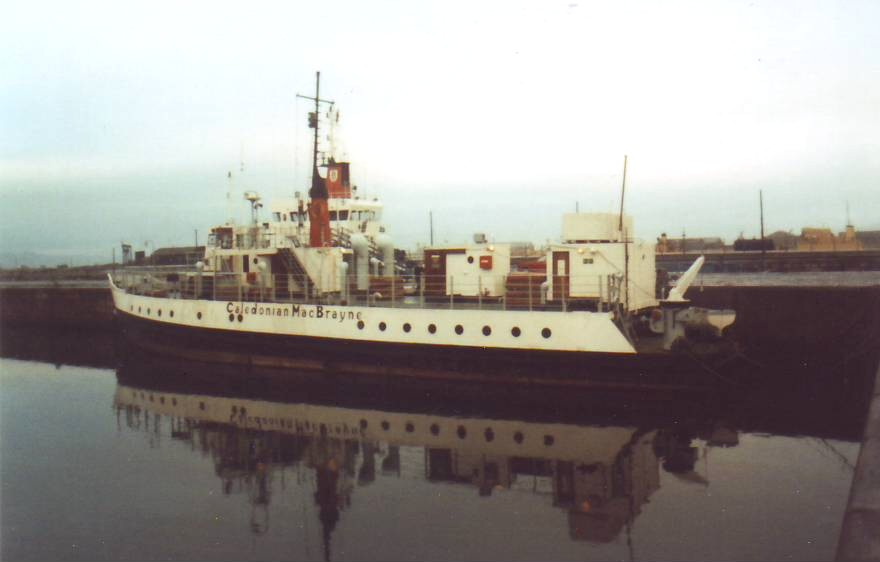
- MV Keppel in James Watt Dock

History

United Kingdom
- Name: 1961–1967: MV Rose; since 1967: MV Keppel
- Namesake: Cumbrae's secondary pier
- Owner: 1961–1967: British Railways Eastern Region; 1967–1992: Caledonian Steam Packet Co., thereafter Caledonian MacBrayne; 1993 Hornblower Cruises, Valletta, Malta
- Port of registry: until 19??: London (likely 1973/4 when Caledonian MacBrayne was formed); until 1993: Glasgow; from 1993: Valletta
- Route: 1961–1967: Tilbury to Gravesend; 1967–1986: Largs to Millport
- Builder: White's Shipyard, Southampton
- Cost: £740,000
- Yard number: 283
- Launched: 19 January 1961
- Acquired: (by CSP) 11 April 1967
- Out of service: (with CalMac) 1993
- Identification: IMO number: 8434415
- Status: in service

General characteristics
- Tonnage: 214 GRT; 1,324 GT
- Length: 110 ft (34 m)
- Beam: 27 ft (8.2 m)
- Draught: 5 ft (1.5 m)
- Installed power: Lister Blackstone 1 Oil 4SCSA 6 cyl. 8 ¾" x 11 ½"
- Propulsion: Voith Schneider
- Speed: 9 knots
- Capacity: 341 passengers

MV Keppel is a passenger-only ferry built in 1961 for the Tilbury to Gravesend crossing. She had twenty years of service on the Largs to Millport route. Since 1993, she has operated in Malta.

== History ==
MV Keppel was the last of three sisters built for British Rail Eastern Region. Originally named Rose, she was launched in 1961 and entered service on the Tilbury to Gravesend route. In 1967 Rose became surplus to the needs of B.R., and was transferred to the Caledonian Steam Packet Company on the Clyde where she was renamed Keppel. The ship then underwent some modifications, and was then placed onto the Largs to Millport route, a service she carried out for almost 20 years.

In 1980 she ran aground off Farland Point and sustained considerable damage.

She became surplus to requirements on the Clyde and was sold in 1993. She operated independently as Clyde Rose (name never registered) for that summer but was laid up at the James Watt Dock, before being sold to Maltese interests.

== Service ==
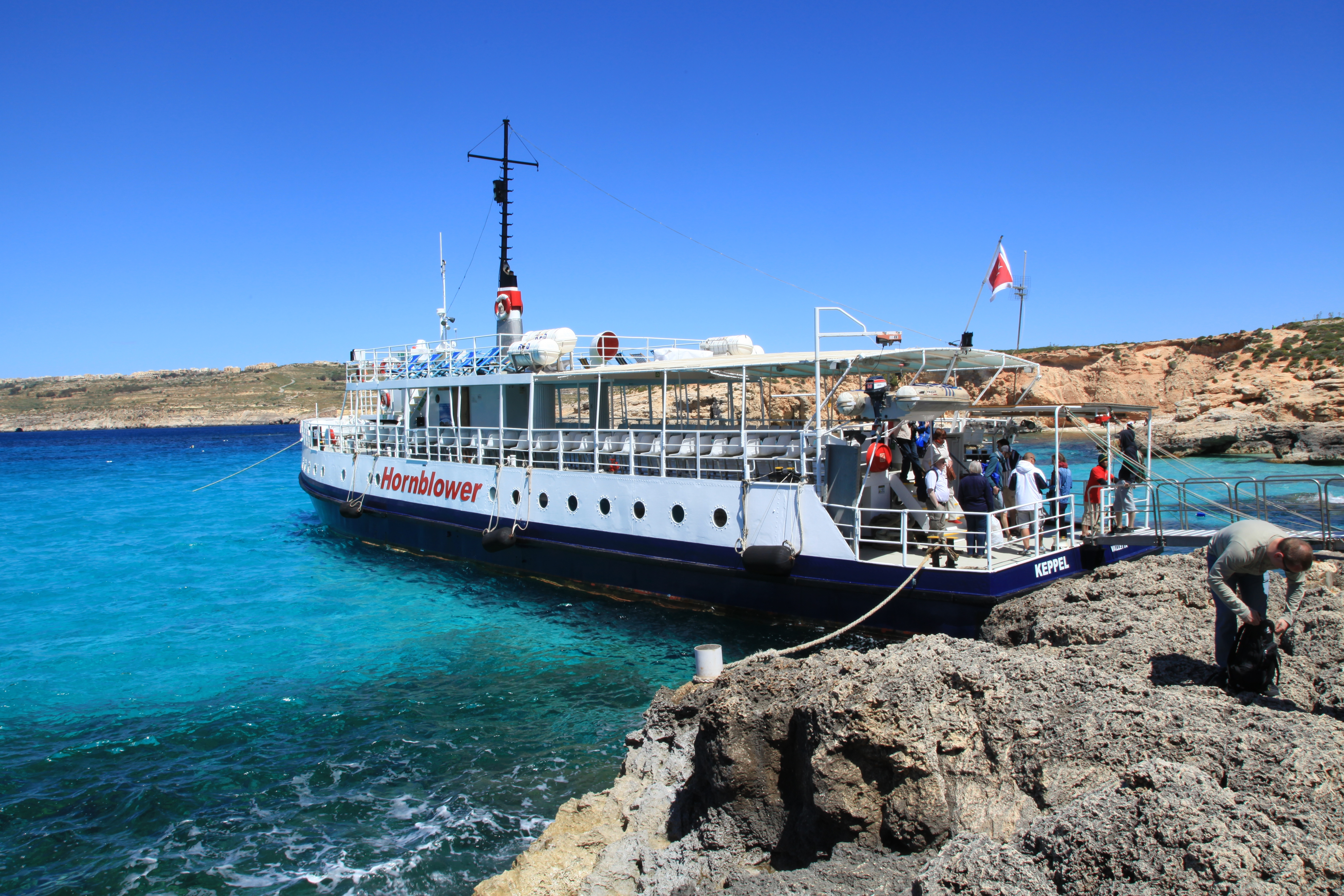
MV Keppel at Comino, Malta.

Built for the Tilbury to Gravesend route on the Thames, she was used as the backup and relief vessel to her sisters. On transfer to the Clyde, she was placed on the Largs to Millport crossing. From 1974, she berthed overnight at Rothesay, giving a morning crossing to Wemyss Bay and serving the McAlpine yard at Ardyne. This ceased when the yard closed in 1977 and Keppel was laid up for most of the year. She gave afternoon cruises to Rothesay and round Cumbrae.

Despite the introduction of MV Isle of Cumbrae, in 1977 on the Largs to Cumbrae Slip crossing, Keppel was retained for a further nine years, until the arrival of the new car ferries, MV Loch Striven and MV Loch Linnhe. Even then, she survived another seven years as a cruise vessel.

Her Maltese owners have extended her career on cruises out of Valletta, and later for cruises to and from the island of Comino. She retains her original engine and Voith Schneider propeller.
