= Ronald Ian Currie =

Scottish marine biologist

Ronald Ian Currie FRSE CBE (1928 – 1996) was a Scottish marine biologist. He was known generally as Ron Currie.

After early research into the analysis of plankton layers in the oceans using measurement of light penetration and audio signals, he was appointed director of the Scottish Marine Biological Association on the West Coast of Scotland.

== Life ==
Born in Paisley on 10 October 1928, the son of Ronald Wavell Currie, a solicitor, he studied Zoology at Glasgow University graduating BSc with First Class Honours in 1949.

After a short time at the University of Copenhagen he joined the Royal Naval Scientific Service where he was seconded to the National Institute of Oceanography then in Wormley, Surrey. During this time he joined expeditions to the Antarctic and the Arabian Sea, on RRS William Scoresby and RRS Discovery, and in 1962 he became Head of Biology at the Institute.

In 1966 he returned to Scotland to become Director of the Scottish Marine Biological Association station at Millport on the island of Great Cumbrae, where he took on the relocation of the station to Dunstaffnage, near Oban, Argyll. Subsequently he was responsible for research projects throughout Scotland and the North Atlantic, and directed the development of the research vessels RRS Challenger, RV Calanus, and RV Seòl Mara.

- Fellow of the Institute of Biology
- Fellow of the Royal Society of Edinburgh
- Secretary of the Scientific Committee on Oceanic Research
- Secretary and President of the International Association of Biological Oceanography
- Secretary of the Challenger Society for Marine Science
- Committee Member on the Nature Conservancy Council
- Vice President of the Marine Conservation Society

Ron was created a Commander of the Order of the British Empire in the 1977 Silver Jubilee and Birthday Honours List in recognition of his contribution to marine science. Heriot Watt University further granted him an honorary professorship in 1979.

A popular figure locally, Ron was for a time Chairman of the local Community Council, and did charitable work with the North British Hotels Trust and the Royal National Mission to Deep-Sea Fishermen.

He retired in 1987, and died in Oban on 19 February 1996.

== Publications ==
- Organic Production in the Sea (1959)
- The Benguela Current (1960)
- Discovery: Britain’s Sea-going Research Laboratory (New Scientist 24 Jan 1963)
