= Great Cumbrae =

Island in the Firth of Clyde sea inlet, western Scotland

Cumaradh Mòr (Gaelic)

Location
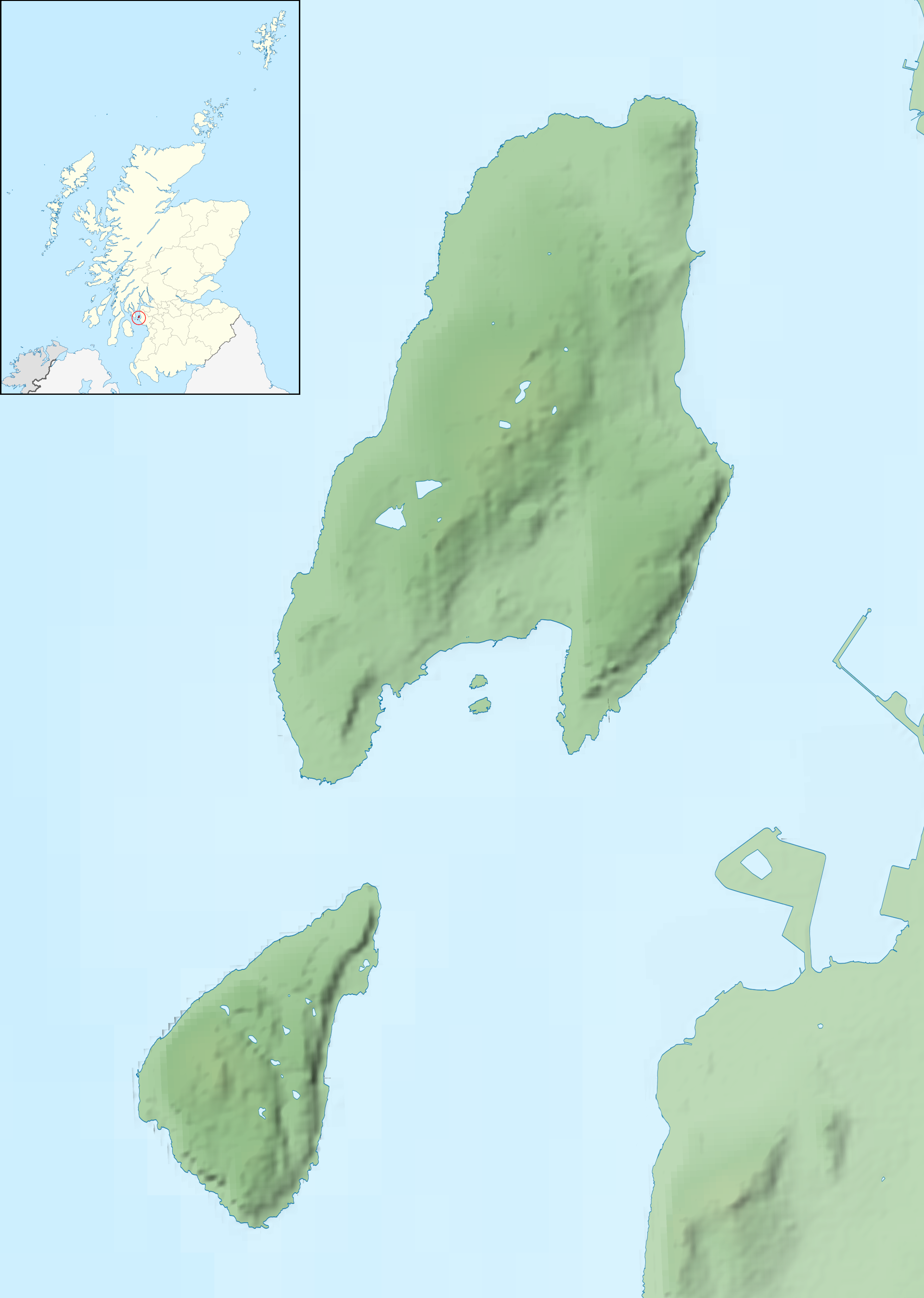
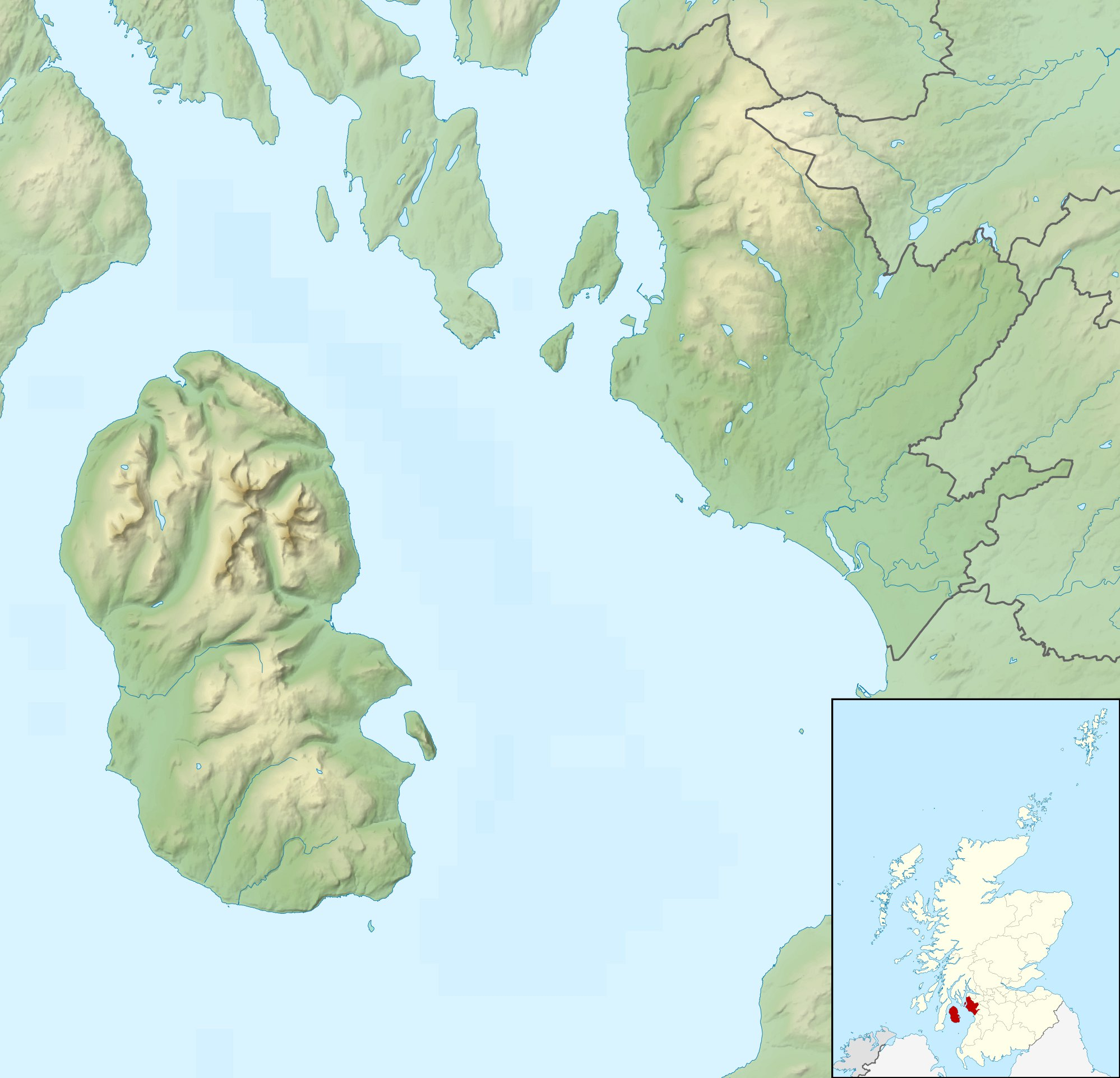
- Great Cumbrae shown with Little Cumbrae Great Cumbrae shown within North Ayrshire
- OS grid reference: NS169566
- Coordinates: 55.77°N 4.92°W

Physical geography
- Island group: Firth of Clyde
- Area: 1,168 ha (4.5 sq mi)
- Area rank: 45
- Highest elevation: The Glaidstane 127 metres (417 ft)

Administration
- Council area: North Ayrshire
- Country: Scotland
- Sovereign state: United Kingdom

Demographics
- Population: 1,293
- Population rank: 10
- Population density: 110.7/km^{2} (287/sq mi)
- Largest settlement: Millport

Great Cumbrae (Scottish Gaelic: Cumaradh Mòr) is the larger of the two islands known as The Cumbraes in the lower Firth of Clyde in western Scotland. The island is sometimes mistakenly called Millport, after its main town.

Home to the Cathedral of The Isles and the FSC Millport field study centre, the island has a resident population of circa 1,300 residents.

== Geography ==
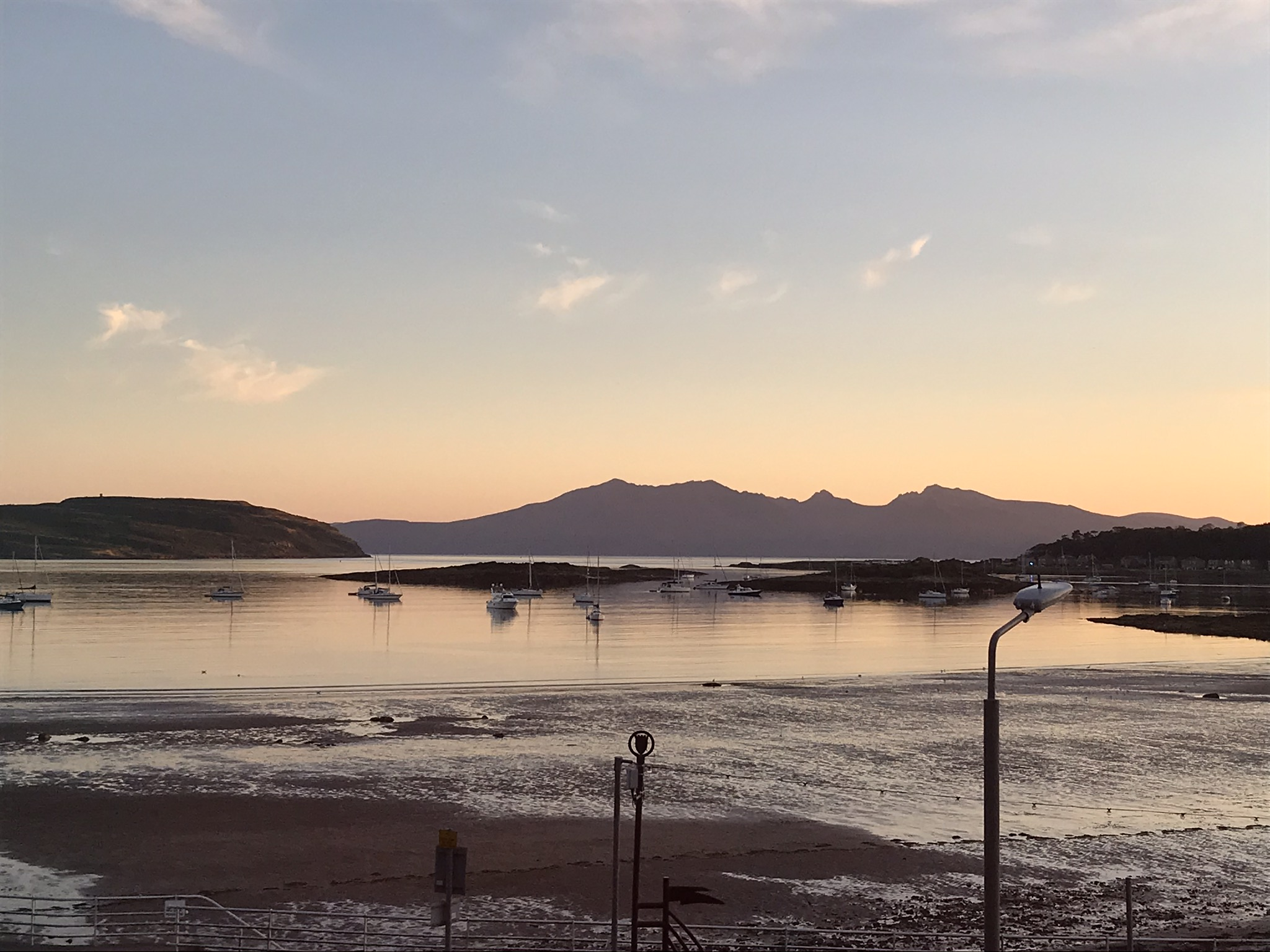
Kames Bay looking towards Arran

The island is roughly 4 kilometres (2 1/2 mi) long by 2 kilometres (1 1/4 mi) wide, rising to a height of 127 metres (417 ft) above sea level at The Glaid Stone, which is a large, naturally occurring rock perched on the highest summit on the island. There is a triangulation pillar nearby, as well as an orientation point which indicates the locations of surrounding landmarks.

In clear conditions, views extend north over the upper Clyde estuary to Ben Lomond and the Arrochar Alps. To the west, the larger islands of Bute and Arran can be seen, while on the other side of Knapdale the Paps of Jura may be visible. Looking south, Ailsa Craig is visible, around 40 mi (60 km) distant beyond Little Cumbrae. Ailsa Craig roughly marks the halfway point to Northern Ireland, which itself may be glimpsed if visibility is good. To the east, the views are not so extensive, being restricted by the higher ground of the Renfrew Hills only a few miles distant, however the town of Largs and village of Fairlie and the deep-water coal terminal and power station at Hunterston can be seen.

Millport, the island's only town, is spread around a bay which makes up the entire south coast of the island.

The land on the island is primarily owned by the farmers, with the other major land owner being the Millport Golf Club.

== Etymology ==
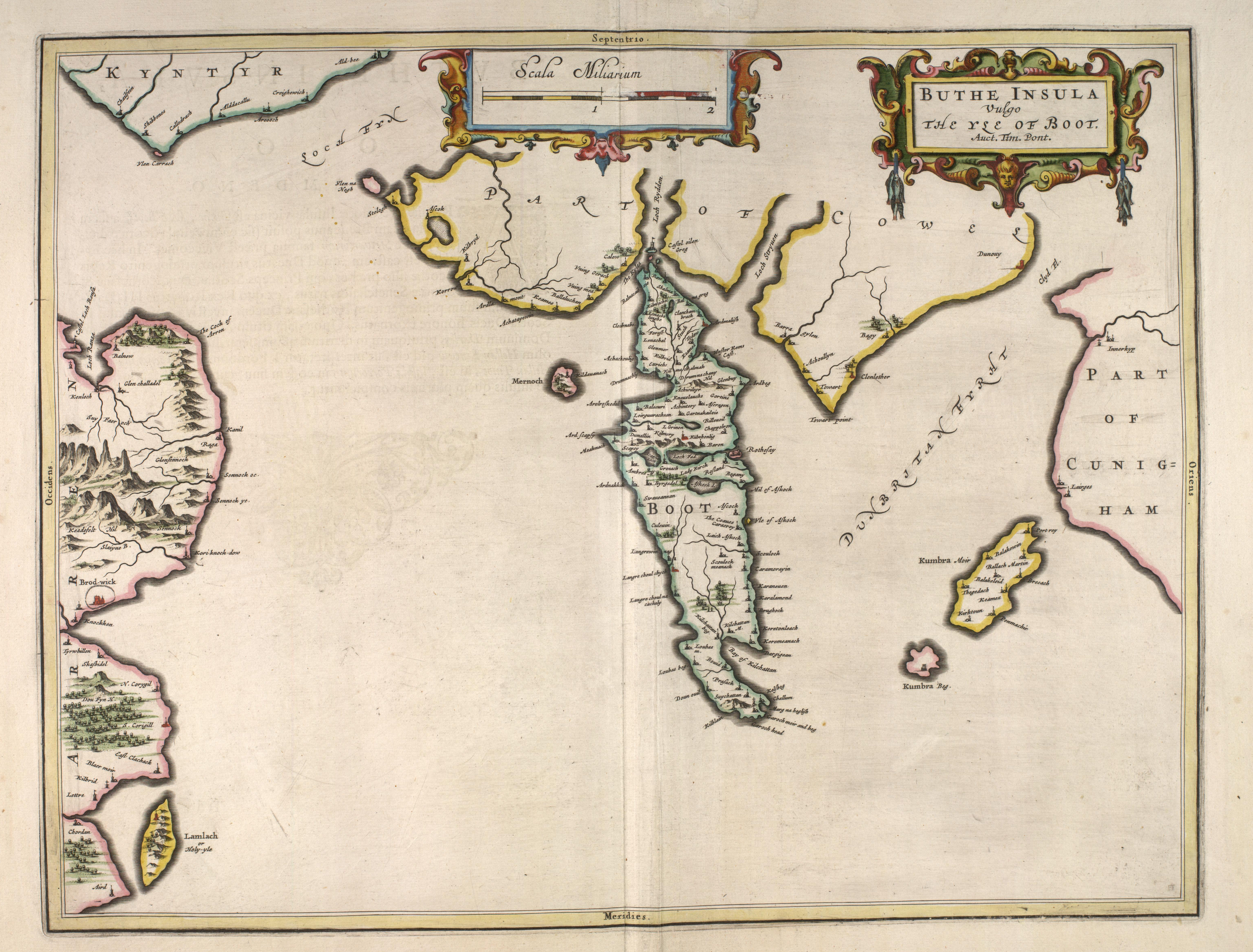
Johan Blaeu's map of Bute and surrounds

The Cumbraes take their name from the Old Norse Kumreyjar, meaning "islands of the Cymry" (referring to the Cumbric-speaking inhabitants of southern Scotland). They are referred to under this name in the Norse Saga of Haakon Haakonarson.

In the 16th century the island was known as Cumbray and its neighbour Little Cumbrae is recorded as Cumbray of the Dais. Johan Blaeu's 17th-century Atlas Maior refers to the Cumbraes as "Kumbra Moir" and "Kumbra Beg", which is evidently anglicised Gaelic for Great and Little Cumbrae. Later in that century Martin Martin refers to "Cumbrae the greater, and the lesser".

In modern Gaelic these two islands are known as Cumaradh Mòr and Cumaradh Beag.

== Geology ==
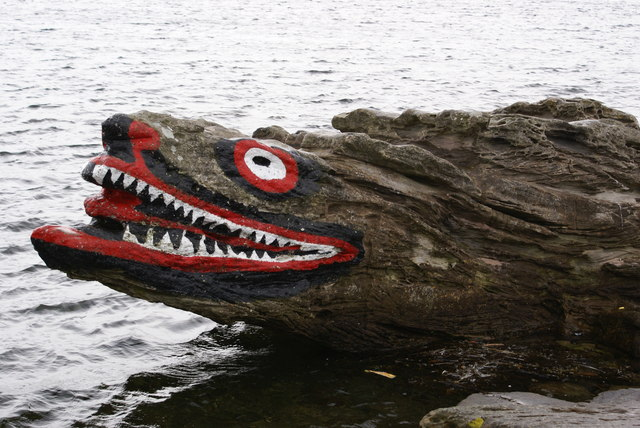
Crocodile Rock, Millport

The island is formed largely from sandstones and mudstones of late Devonian and early Carboniferous age. This sedimentary bedrock is cut by numerous northeast–southwest aligned igneous dykes intruded during the Carboniferous period. Further dykes were intruded during the Palaeogene period, cutting across the earlier ones in a north–south to NNW-SSE in orientation. One of the latter is responsible for the 10m high roadside rock formation known as Lion Rock in the southeast of the island. Several geological faults cut both the country rock and the dykes, the most significant being the north–south aligned Kames Bay Fault which extends from White Bay in the north to the bay from which it derives its name in the south.

The youngest sedimentary rocks are the sandstones forming 'The Eileans' in Millport Bay whilst the Kelly Burn Sandstone is the oldest. In stratigraphical order (i.e. youngest at the top), the sequence is:

- Inverclyde Group
  - Clyde Sandstone Formation
    - Eileans Sandstone Member
    - Millport Cornstones Member
  - Ballagan Formation
  - Kinnesswood Formation
    - Foulport Sandstone Member
    - Doughend Sandstone Member
- Stratheden Group
  - Kelly Burn Sandstone Formation

The Doughend Sandstone (named from the westernmost reach of the island) unconformably overlies the Kelly Burn Sandstone; both are of late Devonian age whilst the rest of the sequence is of Carboniferous age.

Various of the rock formations have become popular with tourists, including Crocodile Rock, Indian's Face, Lion Rock and Queen Victoria's Face. Several have been enhanced with colourful paint.

A raised beach is developed around almost the whole of the island at about 8 metres (26 ft) above current sea level. Vegetated spreads of sand, shingle and boulders occur locally across this platform. Wider in the west, it has been exploited by the B896 coastal road. The island's highest waterfall, Horse Falls, plunges over the old sea cliffs at Bell Bay. A higher raised beach is covered by marine deposits inland of Millport Bay and in the northeast of the island. Inland are traces of till deposited by the glacial ice which over-ran the island during the last ice age. Small areas of peat, alluvium and blown sand are also present in places.

== History ==
The island has been inhabited since the end of the last ice age.

Legend has it that St Mirin, on his return to Scotland from Ireland around AD 710, arrived in Cumbrae and, following the example of St Patrick, rid the island of snakes. The Cathedral of the Isles is reputed to have been built on the site where St Mirin preached. Cumbrae to this day remains snake-free. St Mirin then founded a community in Paisley.

In 1263, Haakon IV, King of Norway, may have used the eastern coast of the island as an anchorage for his fleet, before the inconclusive Battle of Largs. Ballochmartin Bay and Portrye (derived from Gaelic elements meaning "king's harbour") are suggested locations for the Norwegian-anchorage.

Cumbrae has long been linked to Christianity in Scotland. At one time the island had many standing stones. The Aberdeen Breviary of 1509, printed in Edinburgh, tells of two of the island's early female missionaries, Saints Baya and Maura. In 1549 Dean Monro wrote of "Cumbra" that it was "inhabit and manurit, three myle in lenth and ane myle in breadthe, with ane kirk callit Sanct Colmis kirke".

For many centuries the island was under shared ownership, with the Marquess of Bute in the west and the Earl of Glasgow in the east. In 1999 the final feudal landowner, Le Mans winner Johnny Dumfries, now Bute, of Mount Stuart House, put the island up for general sale, with first refusal given to his farmer tenants.

The Annual Reports of the Fishery Board for Scotland provide an insight into the state of fishing from the Cumbraes in the years before the First World War.

Fishery Statistics

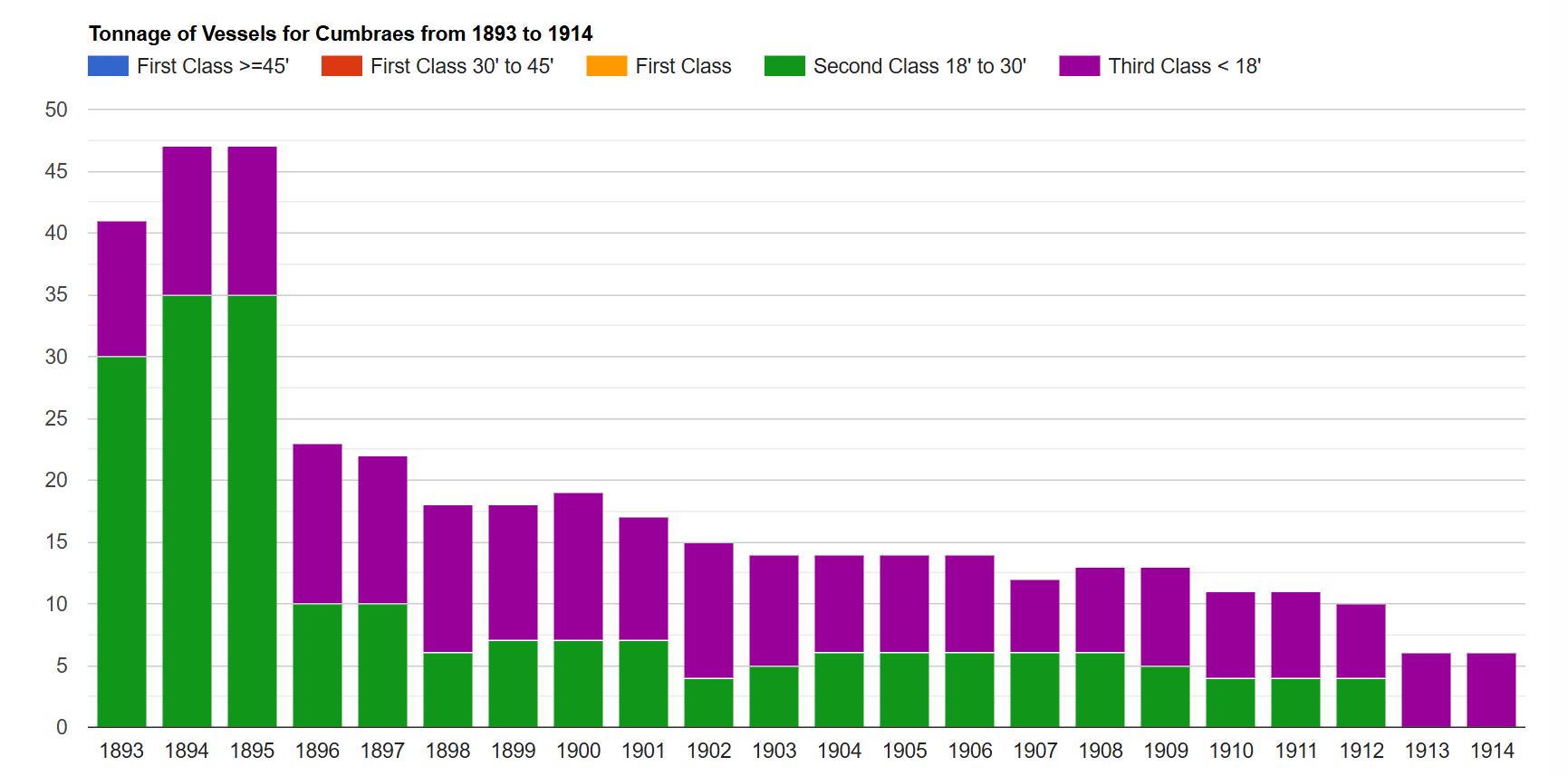
Tonnage of vessels

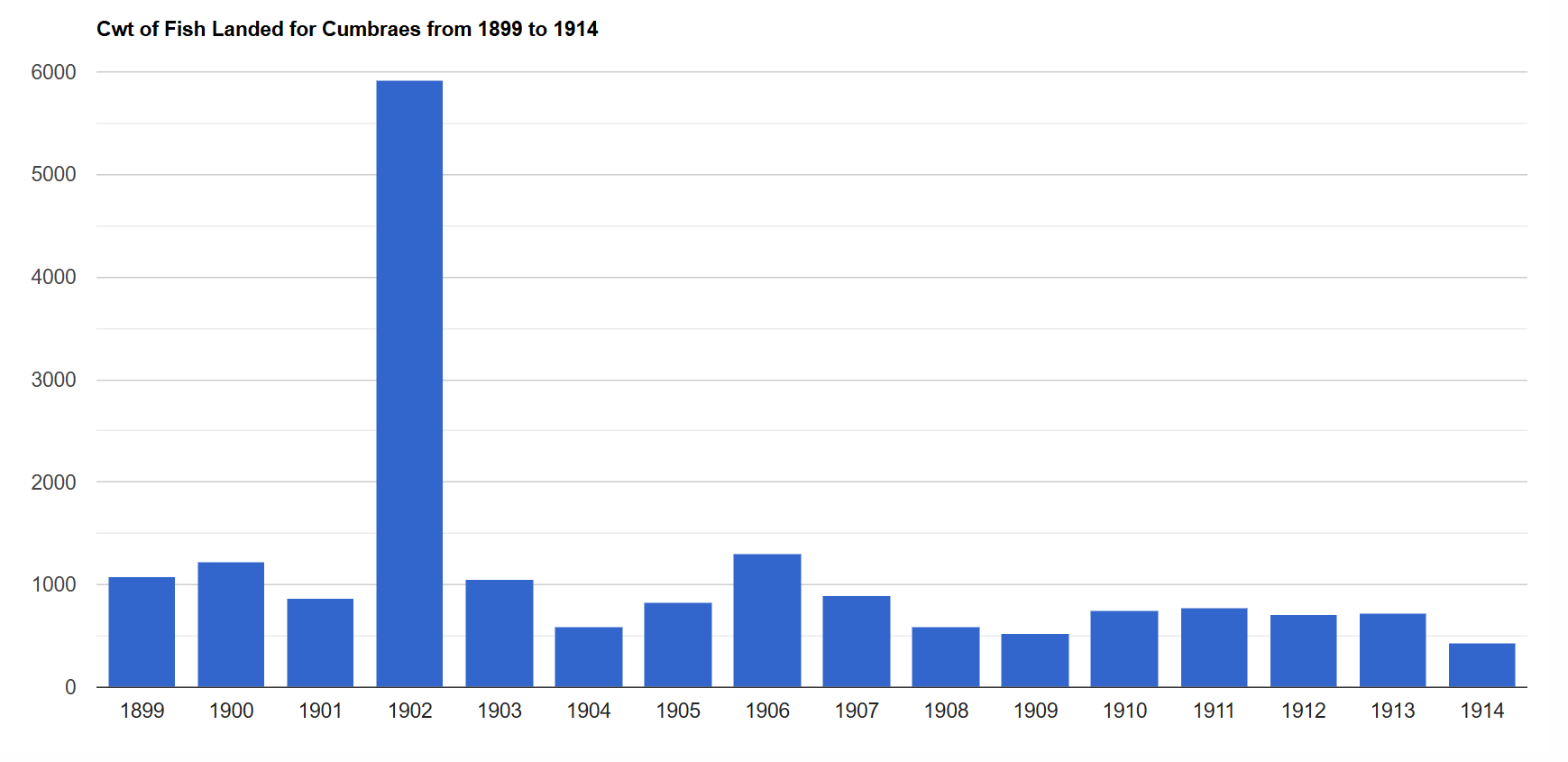
Cwt of fish landed

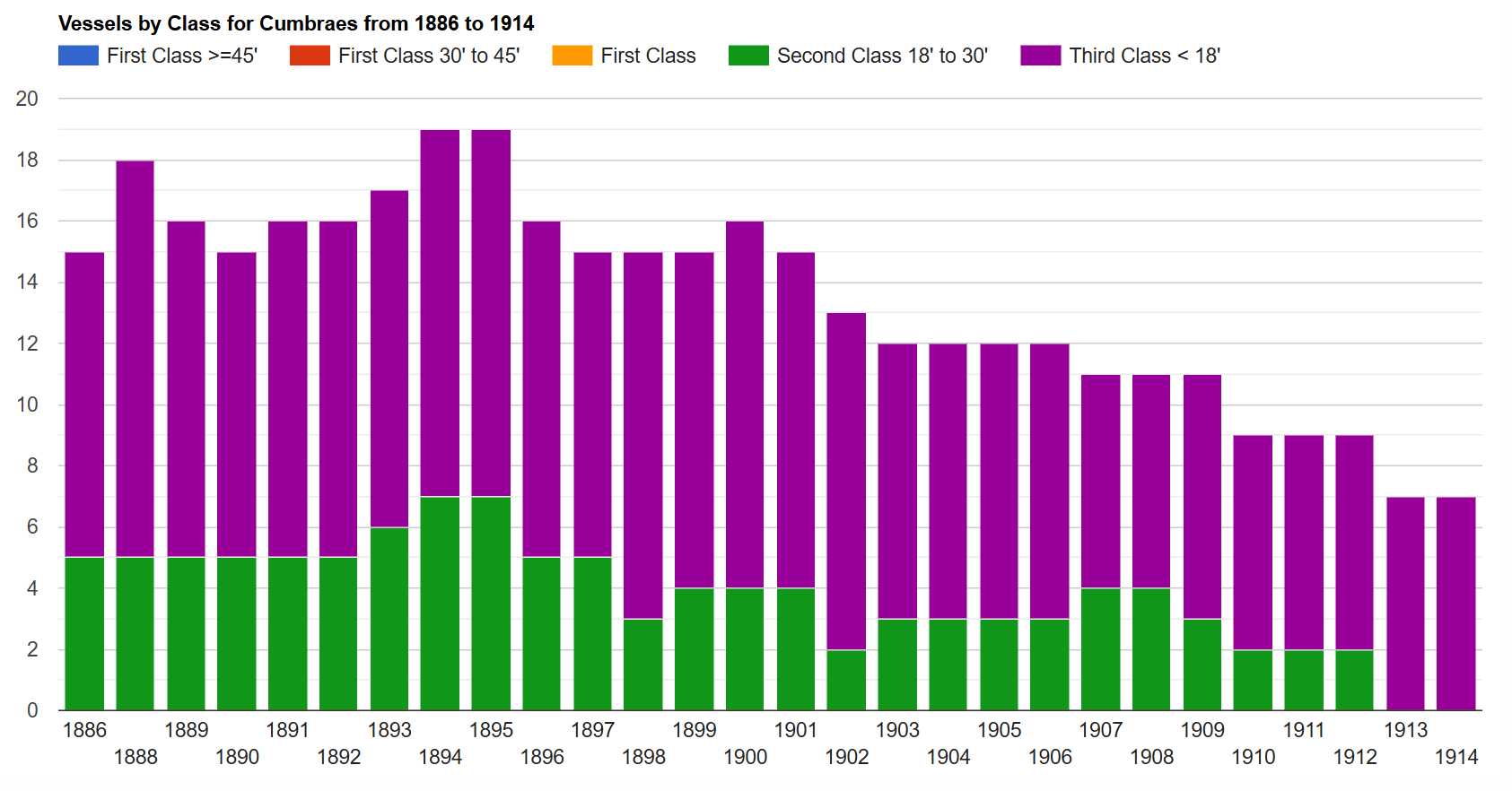
Vessels by class

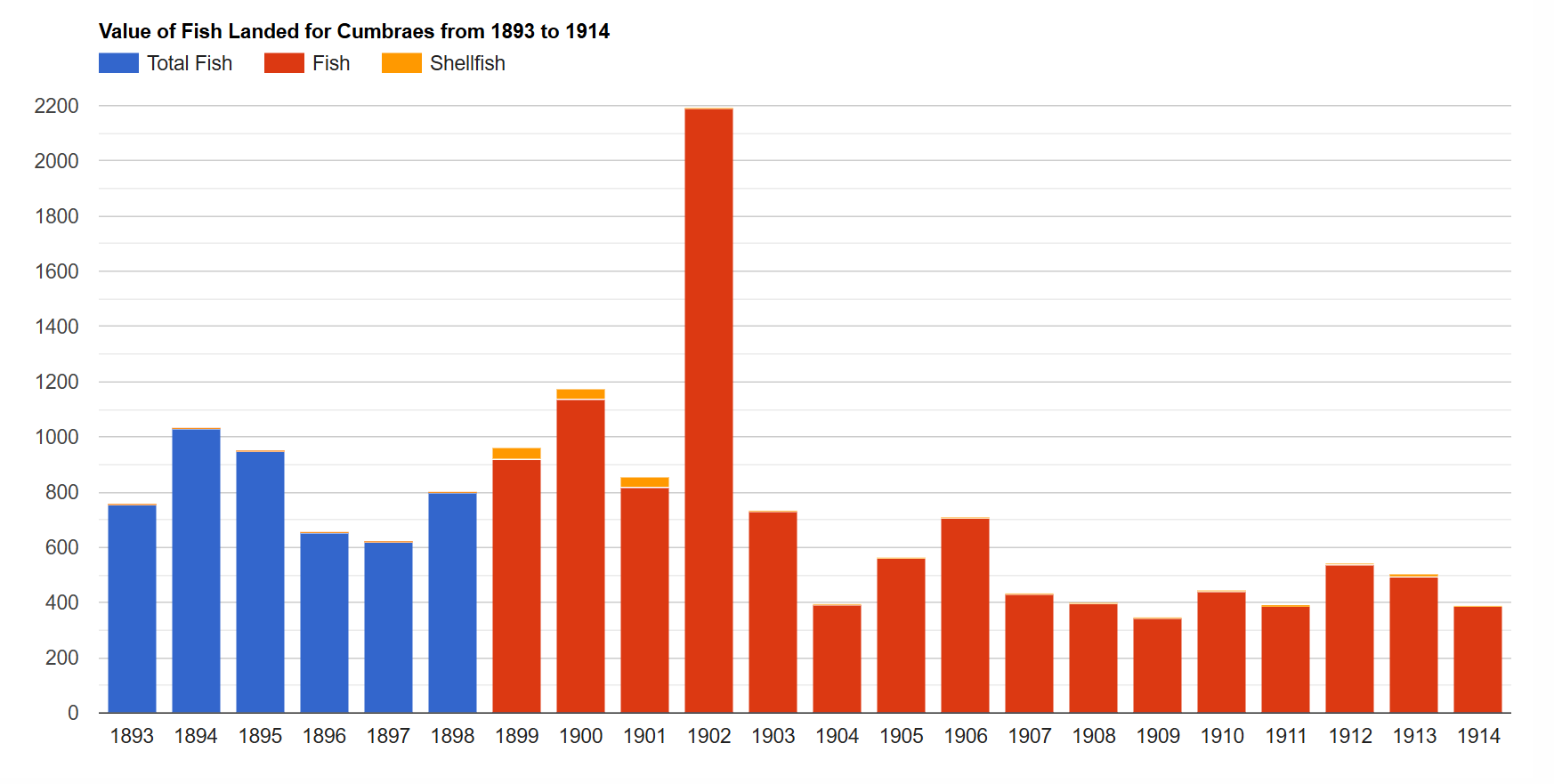
Value (£) of fish landed

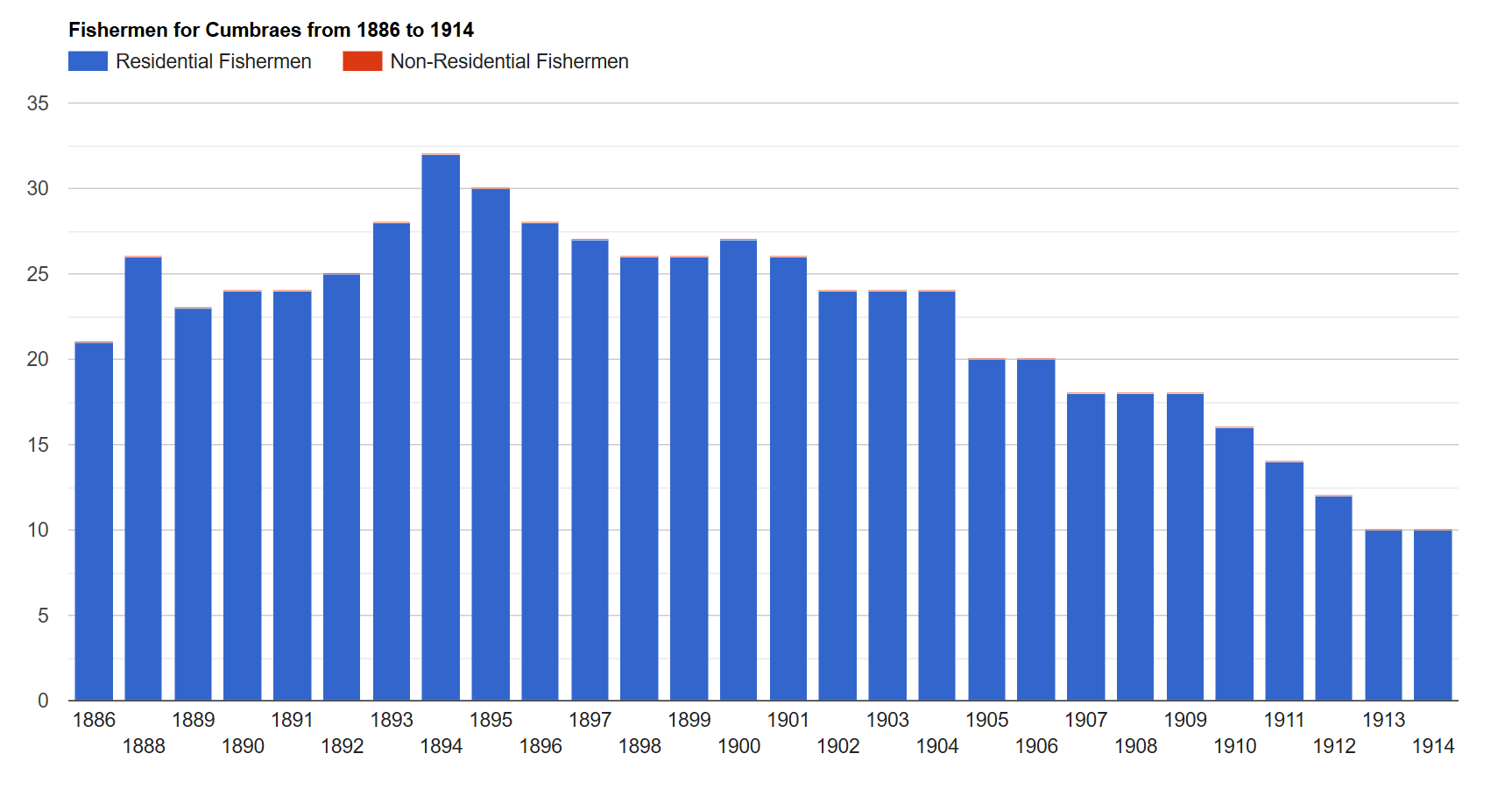
Fishermen

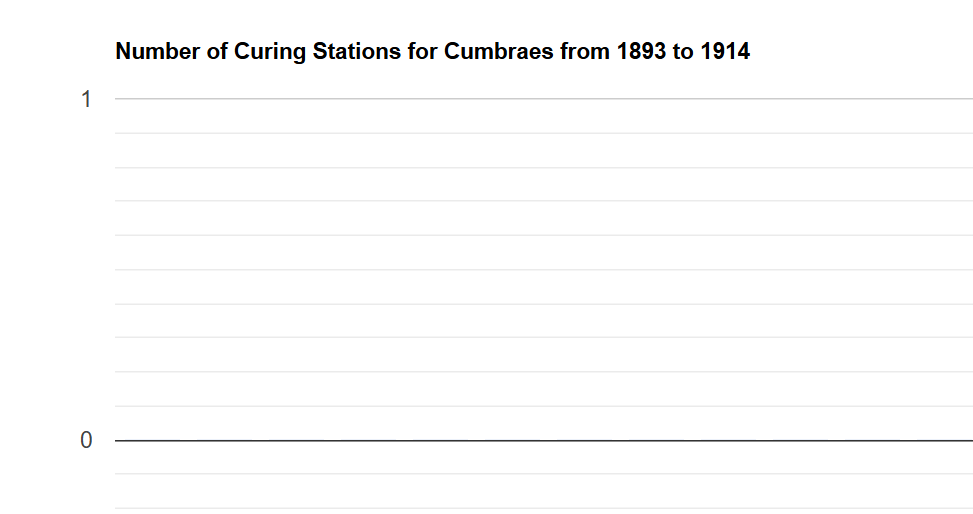
Placeholder- no curing stations

The unusual result in 1902 is mentioned in the report for that year: "The main cause of the increase was the appearance of a shoal of herring on the fishing grounds in the vicinity of the Cumbraes in October, when a good fishing was got during the short time the fish remained in the locality.About twenty years have elapsed since herrings were caught in such quantity in that neighbourhood."

Tourism grew in the 20th century, and Millport became a popular stop for Clyde steamers and families going 'Doon the Watter for the Fair' (Glasgow Fair holidays). It is possible to experience a traditional day out on the PS Waverley which operates from both Glasgow and Ayr during the summer.

The University Marine Biological Station Millport (UMBSM) was run by the Universities of Glasgow and London. Founded in 1885 by Sir John Murray and David Robertson and originally called Millport Marine Biological Station, its buildings near Keppel Pier were opened in 1897. It attracted UK and foreign students throughout the academic year. In May 2003, in the presence of Princess Anne, the station took delivery of the Macduff-built, 22-metre (72-foot) marine Research Vessel Aora. UMBSM also functioned as a Met Office Weather Station and Admiralty Tide Monitor. The station closed in October 2013 and the site, just outside town, has been refurbished and run by the Field Studies Council since 2014.

The island was home to the National Watersports Centre which closed in 2020.

The island also has its own Coastguard Rescue Team whose station is on the South East of the island, adjacent to the FSC Millport and which forms part of His Majesty's Coastguard, one of around 350 such teams based around the coast of the UK.

== Residents ==
The usual island population of 1,376 as recorded by the 2011 census was a slight fall from the 2001 figure of 1,434. By 2022 the population had fallen a little further to 1,293. The population increases substantially during the summer tourist season.

The island has an active and engaged community with a wide range of interest groups represented in the many clubs and associations on the island. The Guardian reported that Cumbrae was number 8 in British online property searches in 2021, attributing this to the effect of the COVID-19 lockdown then in force.

It is estimated that the 2018 economic output of the island was £10.2 million, of which 30% came from the health sector. Total employment was estimated at 400, of which a third worked in the health sector and a quarter in tourism-related sectors.

== Governance ==
The local authority responsible for both the Cumbrae islands is North Ayrshire Council.

The local community is represented by The Cumbrae Community Council. Community Council members are elected by the residents, and all groups and individuals on the island are invited to its monthly meetings. The community council's members are formal members of Locality Planning Partnerships.

== Tourism ==
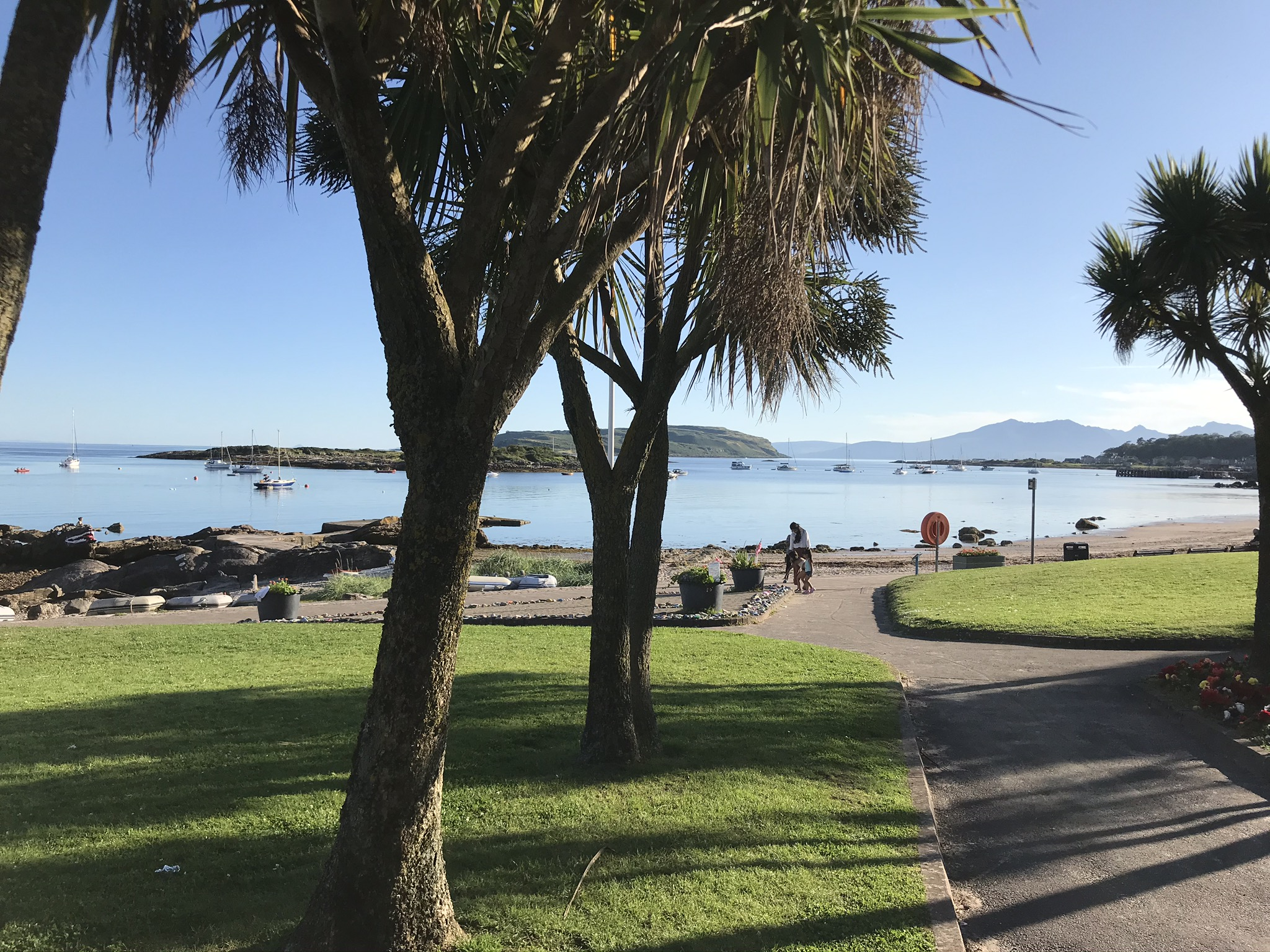
Millport town

During the summer, the population grows by several thousand every weekend. Hiring a bike and cycling around the island's 11-mile (18-kilometre) encircling coastal road is a popular activity for visitors, as the roads are quiet compared to the mainland. There are informal walks all over the island. Fintry Bay, around 3 mi (5 km) from Millport on the west coast, has a small cafe.

Millport Bay, with visitor moorings, is a popular destination for sailors in the summer. The most dived site on the Clyde is just south of the ferry slip; a Second World War Catalina flying boat.

There is a curling pond near the highest point on the island, in January 2010 it hosted the Dumfries Cup for the first time in 14 years, and in December of the same year it was also available for public use.

Other attractions include:

- Cathedral of The Isles – William Butterfield, one of the great architects of the Gothic Revival designed the cathedral church of the Diocese of Argyll and the Isles, within the Episcopal Church of Scotland (Anglican Communion). George Frederick Boyle, 6th Earl of Glasgow acted as the founder and benefactor. Construction finished in 1849 and the cathedral opened in 1851. Formal gardens and woodland surround the cathedral, the highest building on Great Cumbrae and one of the smallest cathedrals in Europe.
- College of the Holy Spirit, also known as Cumbrae Theological College – attached to the cathedral, this former seminary for ordination training is now a Retreat House and the Argyll Diocesan Conference Centre. The college was founded by Boyle in 1849 and was affiliated to the University of Durham during the 1860s. The college closed in 1888 and the building was later used for other purposes. It was the base for The Community of Celebration, or Fisherfolk, an international group of artists and musicians sharing a Benedictine lifestyle during the 1970s and the 1980s.
- The Wedge – a private residence which has the smallest frontage in the UK; the width of a front door.
- Museum of the Cumbraes – occupies part of the Garrison, built originally for the captain of an anti-smuggling revenue cutter.
- FSC Millport – has an aquarium of sea creatures from the Firth of Clyde, and a museum which tells the story of the sea and of the Clyde area, which is open daily. The FSC refurbished the existing facilities of the Marine Biological Station and created two additional blocks, one for accommodation and one for conferences.

== Transport ==
A Caledonian MacBrayne car ferry connects the island with Largs, North Ayrshire on the Scottish mainland. Millport pier dates from 1833 and that at Largs from 1845.

Millport was served by Clyde steamers until the 1960s. Largs is now a regular calling point for PS Waverley. For nearly 20 years from 1967, passenger ferry, MV Keppel crossed to Millport pier. In early April 1977, car ferry MV Isle of Cumbrae took up the crossing to Cumbrae Slip and continued until the sisters MV Loch Striven and MV Loch Linnhe arrived in the summer of 1986. A larger ferry, MV Loch Shira, built at Ferguson Shipbuilders in Port Glasgow, entered service on 2 June 2007. At peak times, she is partnered by one of the original Loch class vessels.

Preceding station	Ferry	Following station
Terminus	Caledonian MacBrayne; Ferry	Largs

As of August 2024, there is a regular bus-service on the island operated by Millport Motors as Route №320, which runs from the ferry terminal to Millport, which has been continuously operated since at least 1950.

== Marine environment and wildlife ==
Cumbrae has a marine climate and can experience gale-force winds from the Atlantic Ocean at any time of year; these westerly or south-westerly gales can be severe and destructive. However, while the west of the island might experience gales up to 70 mph (110 km/h), the weather on the sheltered east side facing Largs can remain tranquil.

Local wildlife includes owls, polecats, rabbits, common kestrels and the occasional golden eagle and sea eagle, as well as a large seabird population: northern fulmars, great cormorants, Eurasian oystercatchers and many more. Other marine life includes seals, basking sharks, porbeagle sharks and dolphins.

== Current developments ==
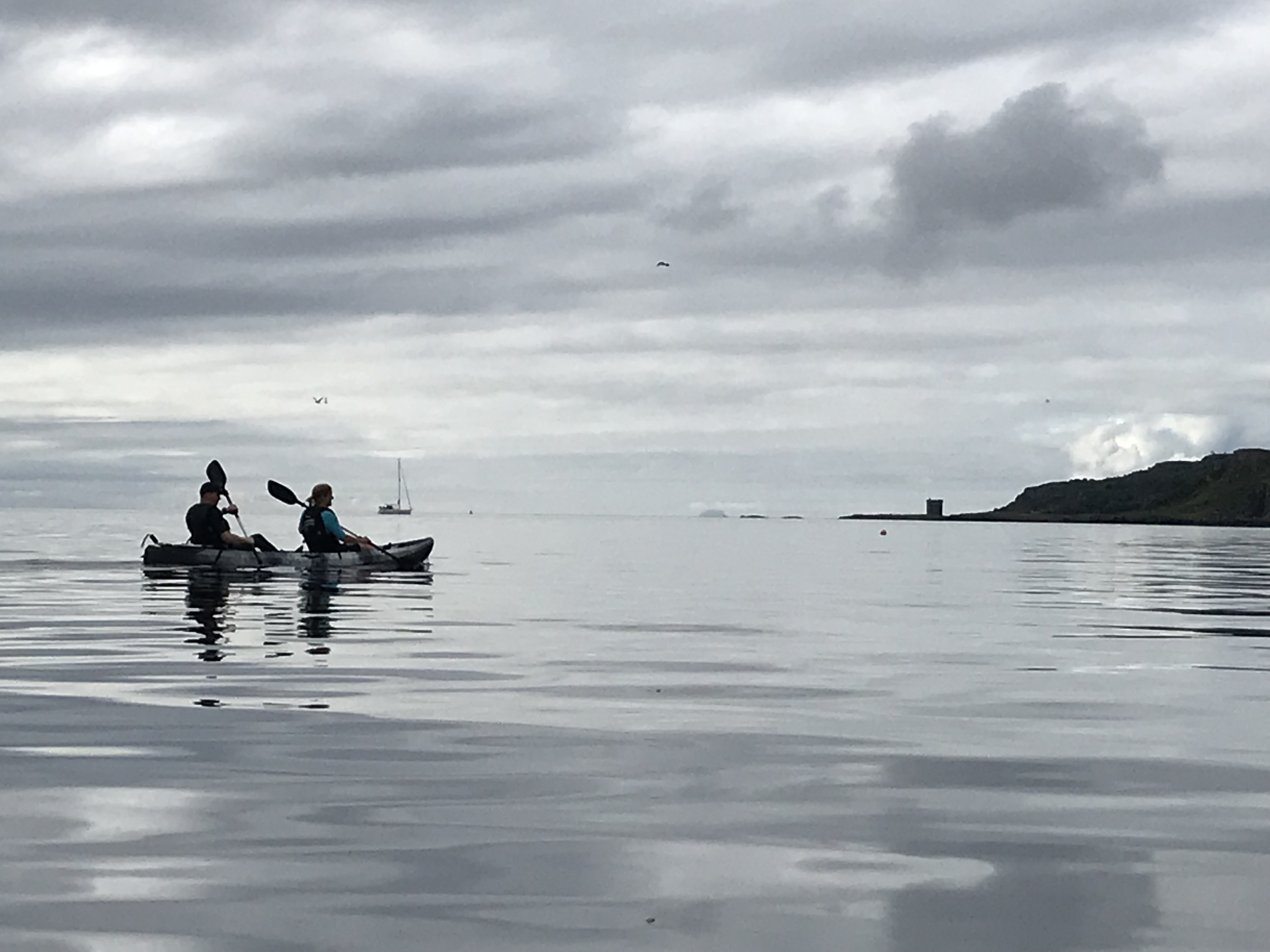
Kayaking in the Firth of Clyde off Little Cumbrae

- A flood protection scheme is in development for the southern part of the island.
- A marina is proposed as part of the flood protection scheme works.
- A new town hall is in development.

== Commonwealth Games – Glasgow 2014 ==
The Commonwealth Torch used in the Queen's Baton Relay for the 2014 Commonwealth Games in Glasgow was crafted using locally sourced elm wood from the garrison grounds in Millport.

== Notable residents ==
- Duncan Macrae (actor and comedian, Whisky Galore, The Prisoner)
- Stephens Orr (society photographer)
- David Robertson (naturalist)
- The Saxon (a Clyde puffer which provided a shipping service to the island) and which featured in the TV series The Vital Spark, based on Neil Munro's Para Handy stories about the Vital Spark.

== Media and the arts ==
The island was featured in the BBC Radio 4 comedy series, Millport, written by and starring Lynn Ferguson.

The island was the focus of a BBC documentary called Seaside Stories which featured many local businesses and residents.

The island also featured in children's TV programme My Story shown on CBeebies in 2012, and in an episode of the TV programme Antiques Road Trip (series 19 episode 24).

== See also ==
- Millport, Cumbrae
- List of islands of Scotland
- Little Cumbrae Castle
