= Millport, Great Cumbrae =

Coordinates: 55.752°N 4.930°W

Millport: Scottish Gaelic: Port a' Mhuilinn
- Town
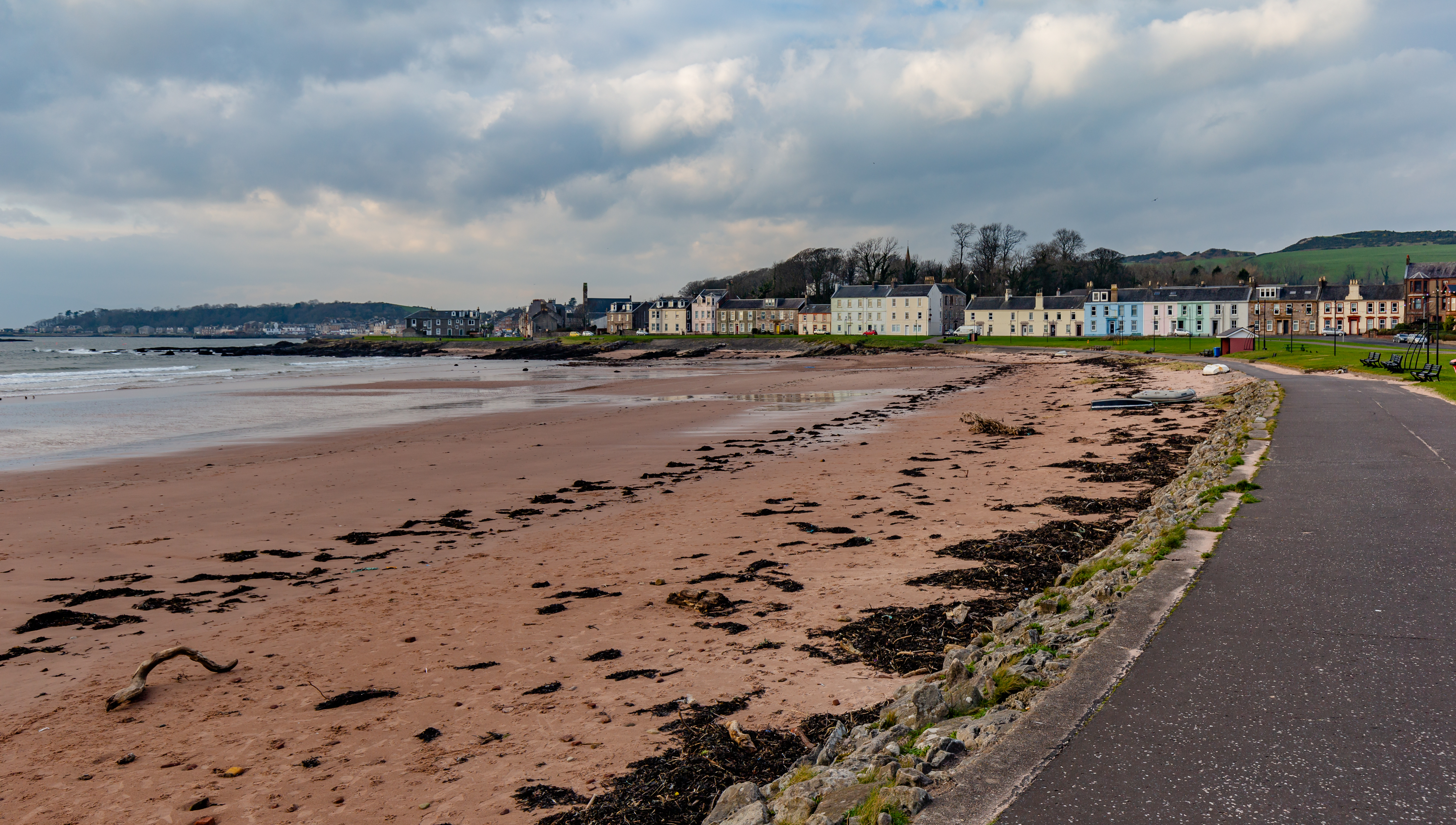
- The beachfront at Millport, Great Cumbrae, 2018

- Location within North Ayrshire
- Population: 1,293 (2022)
- OS grid reference: NS162549
- Council area: North Ayrshire
- Lieutenancy area: Ayrshire and Arran
- Country: Scotland
- Sovereign state: United Kingdom
- Post town: ISLE OF CUMBRAE
- Postcode district: KA28
- Dialling code: 01475
- Police: Scotland
- Fire: Scottish
- Ambulance: Scottish
- UK Parliament: North Ayrshire and Arran
- Scottish Parliament: Cunninghame North

Millport (Scottish Gaelic: Port a' Mhuilinn) is the only town on the island of Great Cumbrae in the Firth of Clyde off the coast of mainland Scotland, in the council area of North Ayrshire. The town is 4 miles (6 km) south of the ferry terminal that links the island to the Scottish mainland with a ferry crossing time of ten minutes.

The town is the location of the Episcopal Cathedral of the Isles completed in 1851, a museum, and "the world's narrowest house". As well as various beaches and leisure facilities, Millport has an 18-hole golf course. One of the best known local landmarks is the Crocodile Rock on the beach near the town centre.

Millport is a popular destination for sailors and tourists in the summer.

== History ==
During the development of the River Clyde as a main thoroughfare for goods, shipbuilding and smuggling, Millport was a strategic base for Customs and Excise. Several of the streets in Millport are named after crew members of the Revenue cutter Royal George. The Victorian era was a period of rapid growth, both in terms of population, governance, amenities and property. To the west and east of the old harbour, many fine Victorian and Edwardian villas were built, along with new tenements. Many of these used rock mined from The Eileans. These large houses still form the backbone of the housing stock.

The Cathedral of the Isles of the Scottish Episcopal Church, completed in 1851, seats only 100 people. It is the smallest cathedral in Great Britain and is variously described as "the smallest cathedral in Europe", "the second smallest in Europe", or "probably the smallest in Europe". Various other churches such as the cathedrals in Nin and Zadar in Croatia lay claim to this title.

The local Lady Margaret Hospital was founded in 1900 and bears the name of Lady Margaret Crichton-Stuart, daughter of John Patrick Crichton-Stuart, 3rd Marquess of Bute as a tribute and mark of respect to the eldest daughter of Lord Bute.

In 2011, Millport considered applying for city status, on the basis of having a cathedral. It would have been the smallest city in the UK.

== Population and demographics ==
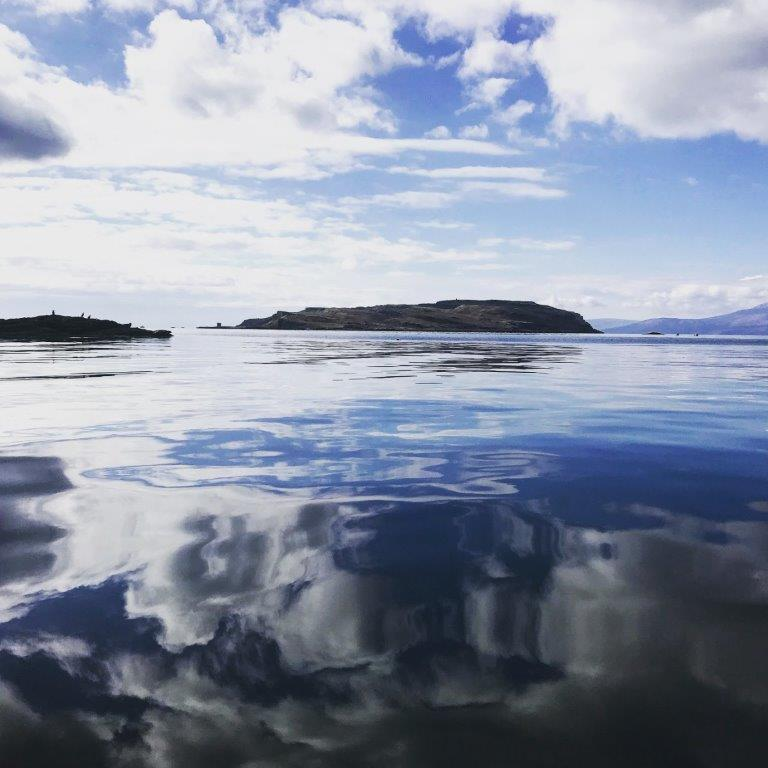
The Eileans, two small islands in Newton Bay

The usual island population of 1,376 as recorded by the 2011 census was a slight fall from the 2001 figure of 1,434. By 2022 there were 1,293 island residents. The population increases substantially during the summer tourist season.

The island has an active and engaged community with a wide range of interest groups represented in the many clubs and associations on the island. The island has its own radio online station, Radio Millport. The Guardian reported that Cumbrae was number 8 in UK online property searches in 2021, attributing this to the effect of the COVID-19 lockdowns then in force.

The island also has its own Coastguard Rescue Team whose station is on the South East of the island, adjacent to the FSC Millport and which forms part of HM Coastguard, one of around 350 such teams based around the coast of the UK.

As well as its numerous beaches, Millport has an 18-hole golf course with views over the Arran hills and the Firth of Clyde. Other recreational facilities include a crazy golf course, Millport Bowling Club with a putting green, and two football pitches. In addition to coastal sea fishing, primarily for mackerel, fly fishing is available at two fresh water reservoirs.

The perimeter road around the island is used by walkers and cyclists and provides access to the island's beaches.

The community is represented by The Cumbrae Community Council. Council members are elected by the residents, and all groups and individuals on the island are invited to its monthly meetings. The community council provides a connection with North Ayrshire council, and its members are formal members of Locality Planning Partnerships. Millport is part of North Ayrshire, and is represented on North Ayrshire Council as part of the North Coast council ward which is based at Cunningham House in Irvine, the administrative centre of North Ayrshire Council.

== Developments ==
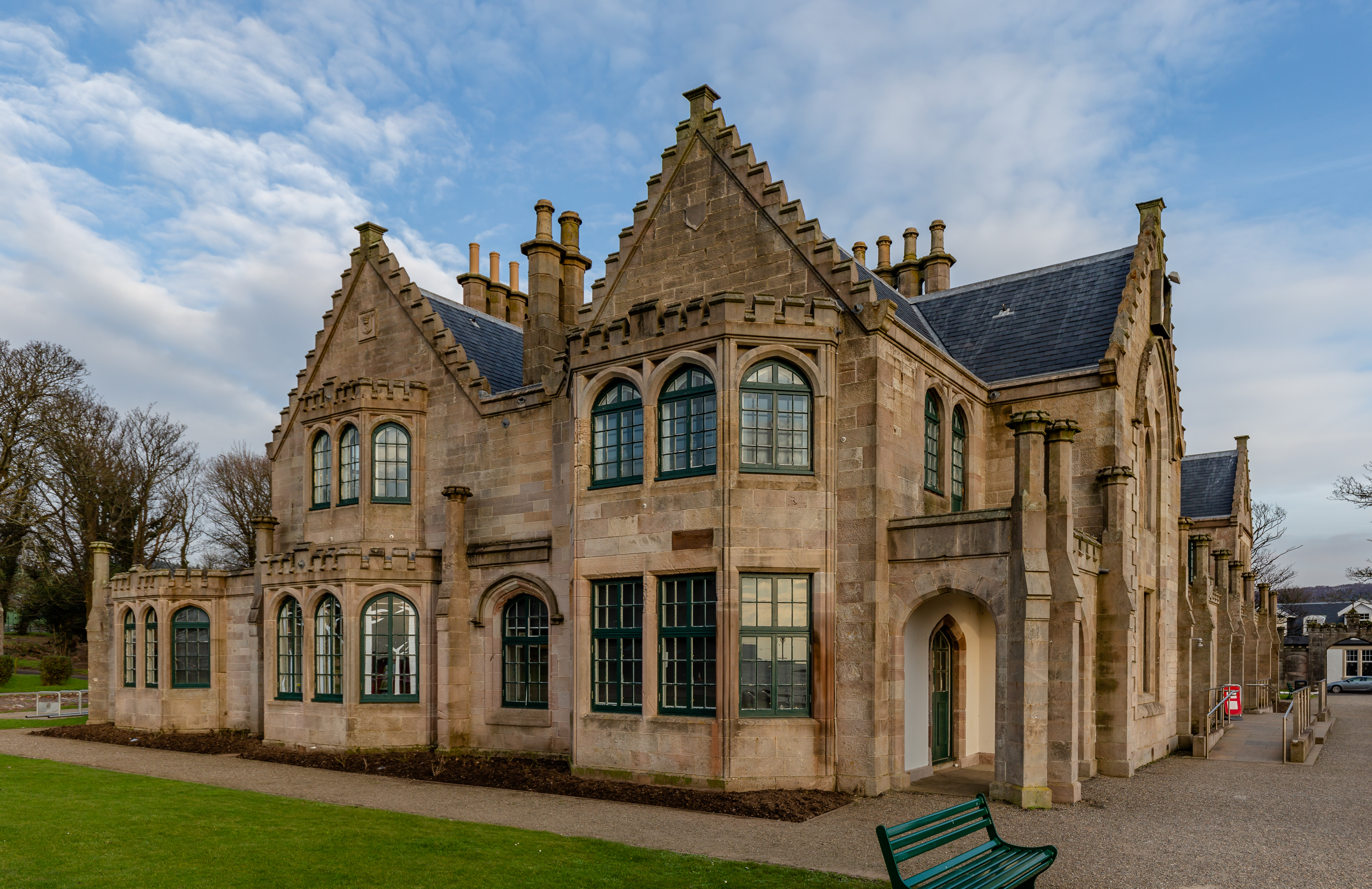
Garrison House

The Garrison House in the centre of town, constructed in 1745, was formerly the barracks and Captain's mansion, then the home of the Earl of Glasgow, and is now in community ownership.

The Garrison House was badly damaged after an arson attack in 2001. Cumbrae Community Development Company, the local development trust, made a successful bid to the National Lottery and other funders to enable the building to be re-constructed for community benefit. After several years of work renovation of the property was completed in 2008 at a total cost of £5 million. It now houses the Museum of the Cumbraes, a library, council offices, a GP surgery and the Garrison Café.

As of 2022, developments on the island include:

- A flood protection scheme is being developed for the south of the island.
- A marina is proposed as part of the flood protection scheme works.
- Millport Town Hall is being brought back into use.
- A proposal is underway to buy the former National Watersports Centre and make it into a community facility called The Wave.

== Economy and education ==
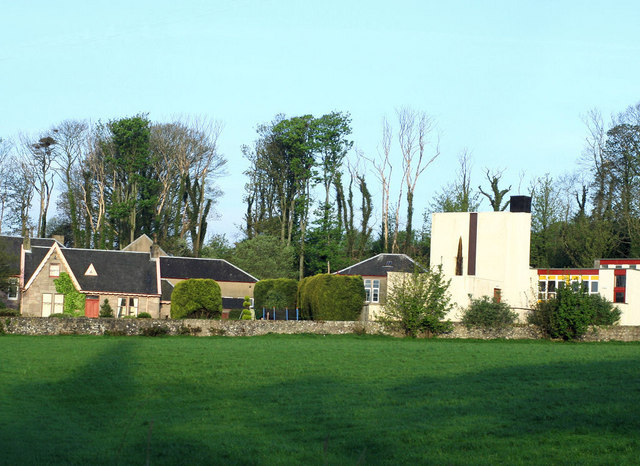
Cumbrae Primary School is the town's only primary school

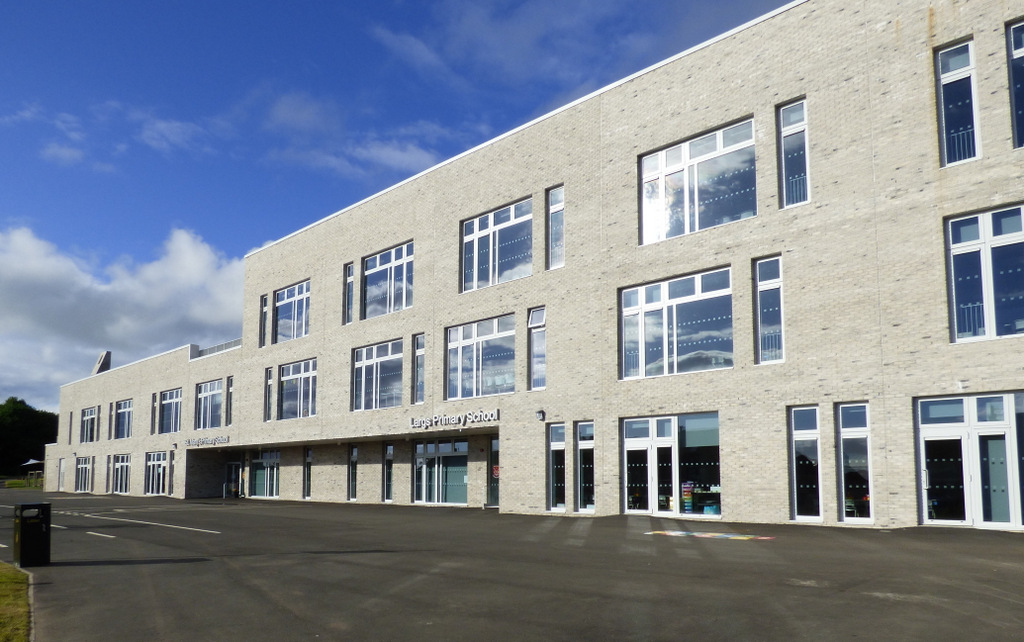
Children attending secondary school attend Largs Academy on the North Ayrshire mainland

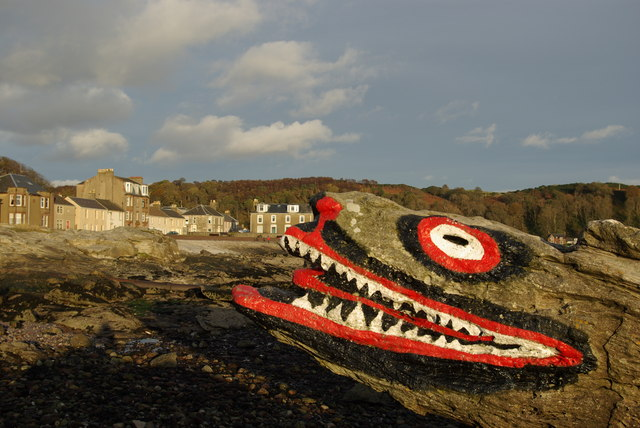
Crocodile Rock, a feature of Millport for over a century.

Millport has a hotel and guest house, and many properties are available as holiday lets. A motorhome site caters for short term stays.

The wide sandy beaches close to the centre of the town are popular for paddling and swimming. One of the best known landmarks in Millport is the Crocodile Rock, a rock on the foreshore that has been painted to look like a crocodile. It has been a feature since at least 1913 when Robert Brown was acknowledged by the council for the work.

Millport has the world's narrowest house, The Wedge, which measures 47 inches (1.2 m) at its front. The house is 22 feet long by 11 feet wide at its widest point (6.7 m × 3.4 m).

Millport Bay is a popular destination for sailors in the summer, and has a number of donation-based visitor moorings. There is a small boatyard at the western end of the town. The town hosts Scotland's biggest independent country music festival, the Millport Country Music Festival, in September each year, and a fireworks display is held during September. The historic paddle steamer PS Waverley calls at Millport twice a week during the summer, on trips originating at Ayr and Glasgow.

Primary-aged children on the island attend Cumbrae Primary School. Older children attend Largs Academy on the mainland. FSC Millport is a biological teaching and research centre operated by the Field Studies Council. The centre's origins can be traced back to 1885, when the oceanographer Sir John Murray set up a floating laboratory in a lighter which he called 'The Ark'. This led to the establishment of the Millport Marine Biological Station in 1897 by the naturalist David Robertson, also known as the 'Cumbrae Naturalist'.

In 1970 the station became the University Marine Biological Station Millport of the University of London. In 2014 ownership transferred to the Field Studies Council, which built new classrooms and accommodation for school and university visitors as well as providing holiday accommodation. The National Watersports Training Centre was a Sportscotland facility that taught a wide range of courses including sailing, windsurfing, paddlesports, cruising and yachting. The centre closed in 2020, and a local group is planning to reopen the site for community use.

== Transport ==
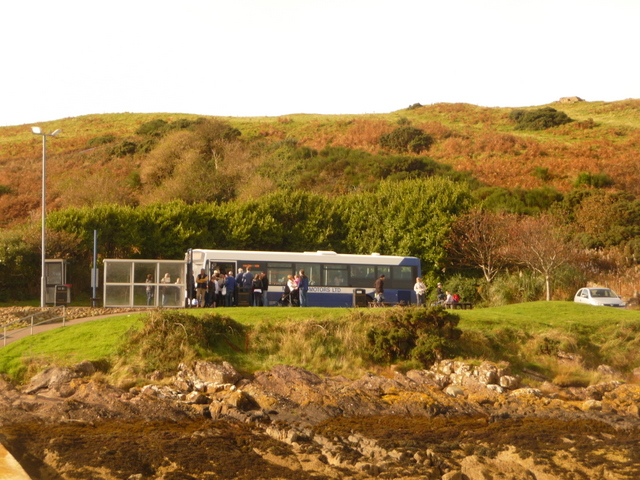
Bus connecting with ferry services

In spite of its relatively remote feel, Millport is only one hour's travel from the major transport hubs of Glasgow Airport and Glasgow Central railway station. Millport is accessible by public transport via the train at Largs, with a ferry journey of ten minutes. A bus to Millport meets each ferry on arrival.

== In popular culture ==
The town of Millport was the titular setting for the BBC Radio 4 comedy Millport; written by Lynn Ferguson. The series was broadcast between 2000 and 2002, and recounts the lives of several Millport inhabitants including Irene Bruce (played by Ferguson) and her sister Moira, with the former desperate to leave the isolated community and start her life anew in the mainland. The radio series resulted in a television adaptation in 2002 that did not progress beyond the pilot, the latter being not well received by the islanders.

Millport is also mentioned in the “Millport” sketch from Limmy's Show Series 1, Episode 5 broadcast in 2010.
