= David Robertson (naturalist) =

Scottish naturalist of the 19th century

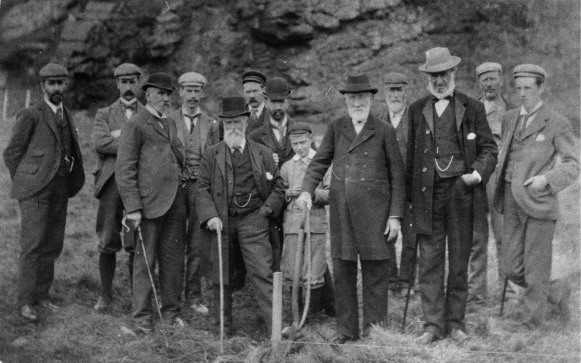
Robertson at the founding of the Marine Biological Station, 1896

David Robertson FLS, FGS (1806–1896) was a Scottish naturalist and geologist who founded the University Marine Biological Station, Millport.

Robertson was born in Glasgow. From age 8 he worked as a herd boy in Ayrshire, but eventually went on to gain a medical degree. His interests turned to the study of Natural History in the town he regularly visited, Millport, in the Firth of Clyde. He studied the local flora and fauna and established Millport as a significant area for marine biological research. In 1885 he had the 'Ark', an old floating laboratory, drawn up on shore, at Port Loy, Cumbrae. He persuaded members of the professional and business community in Glasgow to fund a permanent marine research station there. Work was progressing on the building of the present Marine Station and museum when Robertson died aged 90. The station opened in 1897 and consisted of a laboratory, museum, and public aquarium.

Robertson was assisted in his collecting by his second wife Hannah Robertson.

With George Stewardson Brady (1832–1921) and HW Crosskey he wrote A Monograph of the Post-Tertiary Entomostraca of Scotland, printed for the Palaeontographical Society. With Crosskey he wrote on the post-tertiary fossiliferous beds of Scotland (Trans. Geol. Soc. Glasgow).

Robertson was known as 'The Cumbrae Naturalist'.
