= Field Studies Council =

Educational charity based in the UK

- Formation: 1943; 83 years ago
- Founded at: Natural History Museum, London, England
- Registration no.: 313364
- Legal status: Charity
- Purpose: First Hand experience in the Outdoors
- Headquarters: Shrewsbury, England
- Website: www.field-studies-council.org

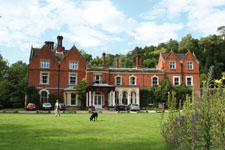
Juniper Hall Field Studies centre in Surrey, operated by the Field Studies Council

Field Studies Council is an educational charity based in the UK, which offers opportunities for people to learn about and engage with the outdoors.

== History ==
The organisation was established as the Council for the Promotion of Field Studies in 1943. It was originally based at Valley Farm, East Bergholt, leasing the property from the Society for the Protection of Ancient Buildings. At this time the National Trust acquired nearby Flatford Mill and Willy Lott's Cottage. These buildings were then leased to the FSC to create the first Field Studies Centre, which opened in 1945, and to provide opportunities for school children to study plants and animals in their natural environment. It subsequently became a nationwide provider of outdoor education, and has established a network of field centres providing facilities for people wanting to study natural history, ecology and the environment.

== Activities ==
Field Studies Council provides outdoor educational residential or day visits from the organisation's centres, and other outreach areas, including London parks.

The centres include:

- Amersham Field Centre, Buckinghamshire
- Bishops Wood, Worcestershire
- Blencathra, Cumbria
- Castle Head, Grange-over-Sands, Cumbria
- Dale Fort, Pembrokeshire
- Epping Forest, Essex
- Flatford Mill, Colchester
- Juniper Hall, Surrey
- London Parks: Bushy Park, Greenwich Park and Regent's Park
- Margam Park, Neath Port Talbot
- Millport, Island of Great Cumbrae, North Ayrshire
- Nettlecombe Court, Somerset
- Preston Montford, Shropshire
- Rhyd-y-creuau, Conwy
- Slapton Ley, Devon

The Field Studies Council creates a programme covering a wide variety of outdoor education, including fieldwork opportunities in geography and biology, providing fieldwork opportunities to allow students to investigative practical skills and to be given the chance to evaluate and analyse data they collect themselves, and data already held by the organisation.

The Field Studies Council also publishes fold-out charts and guides. BioLinks South East and BioLinks West Midlands are lottery funded schemes set up to strengthen UK biological recording.

With the goal of promoting and improving geography fieldwork, the Field Studies Council has entered into a partnership with The Geographical Association. Together, they work towards creating cases for geography and fieldwork within policy, and creating resources for education and career development.

Partnerships projects include:

- Forgotten Places: Greening Coastal Towns and Cities
- The Generation Green project Access Unlimited
- Mission:Invertebrate
- Our Bright Future
- Nature Friendly Schools
- Work to change policy within education to include environmental studies to school and college students
