= Lynn Ferguson =

Scottish writer and actress (born 1965)

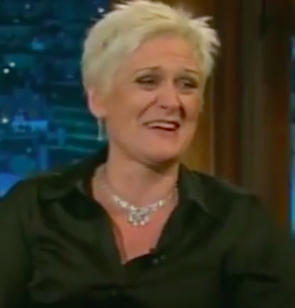
- Ferguson on The Late Late Show, September 2008
- Born: 11 April 1965 (age 61); Glasgow, Scotland
- Other name: Lynn Tweddle
- Education: Cumbernauld High School, Royal Scottish Academy of Music and Drama
- Occupations: Screenwriter, actress, comedian, presenter
- Years active: 1990–present
- Spouse: Mark Tweddle (m. 2002)
- Children: 2
- Relatives: Craig Ferguson (brother)

Lynn Ferguson Tweddle (born 11 April 1965) is a Scottish writer, comedian, actress, and creative consultant. Her writing credits include works in theatre, radio, television and film. The younger sister of comedian Craig Ferguson, she is known for voicing the character of Mac in the animated film Chicken Run (2000), and its sequel Chicken Run: Dawn of the Nugget (2023).

From 2009–2011, she was a writer on The Late Late Show with Craig Ferguson and has served as a writer for the radio stations BBC Radio 4 and BBC Radio Scotland. She has frequently performed at the international Edinburgh Festival Fringe. She was cast as Stella in the Channel 4 comedy drama series No Angels (2004–2006). In 2012, Ferguson was approached by Disney to serve as one of the writers for the movie Brave.

== Early life ==
Ferguson grew up in Cumbernauld. She was the youngest of four and, like her sister, was Senior Prefect at Cumbernauld High School. She left school at the age of 18 and worked one season as a Bluecoat for Pontin's. She later studied at the Royal Scottish Academy of Music and Drama where she gained a BA in Dramatic Studies in 1986.

To work as a professional actress she required an Equity union card, which was at that point only available through paid work, so with a fellow student she formed the Alexander Sisters – a comedy double act parodying traditional Scottish variety styles typified by the Alexander Brothers. She then began performing standup comedy. Her first paid gig was on STV's Funny Farm. Before long she employed as compere at the Red Rose Comedy Club in Finsbury Park, London whilst continuing to perform gigs throughout the UK.

During this time Ferguson was also writing and presenting for BBC Scotland's children's program Megamag. She played a comedy character journalist Fergski who blundered through interviewing teen artists of that era – Ant & Dec, Aswad and Michelle Gayle. In one episode a security guard played by Phill Jupitus stops Fergski interviewing East 17 on the now defunct Top of the Pops set.

In 1995, Ferguson was commissioned to write an hour of standup comedy for the Edinburgh Festival Fringe but instead wrote her first play, a solo show titled Heart and Sole. For her performance Ferguson won the Stage Award for Acting Excellence, later transferring the play to the Hampstead Theatre and touring it in Hong Kong and Melbourne.

== Career ==
=== Writer ===
Ferguson has written extensively for BBC Radio 4: three series (18 episodes) of the popular sitcom Millport; various pieces for Woman's Hour including a series of updated fairy tales called After Happy Ever alongside afternoon plays (The Lie, The Fly, and Kindling) as well as comedy monologues for Craig Ferguson. For BBC Radio Scotland she wrote and presented a series exploring the minds of comedy writers, Laughed Off the Page, interviewing Colin Bostock-Smith, Galton and Simpson, Ian Pattison, and Dick Vosburgh. For TV, she has written half-hour pilots for BBC Two and BBC Scotland and a half-hour short film for Channel 4.

A regular contributor to the Edinburgh Festival Fringe, eight of her plays have been produced there and she has won a Fringe First Award from The Scotsman. In 2016, she returned to Edinburgh, writing the play Careful for Horse McDonald, and again in 2017, co-writing Life, Death and Duran Duran with one of her story clients, Sam Shaber. November 2017, she premiered her new play The Weir Sisters in Glasgow at Òran Mór Play, pie and a pint As well as her performance pieces, she has written various columns for publications including The Scotsman, The Stage, Time Out, The Big Issue and The Herald.

She wrote for The Late Late Show with Craig Ferguson, her brother's American talk show/variety program, from October 2008 to June 2011. She was also a writing consultant for Pixar on the film Brave.

=== Acting ===
As well as winning the Stage Award for Acting Excellence she has been nominated twice. In addition to her own written works, she has performed in theatre extensively. Ferguson toured with the Royal National Theatre in the lead part, Shen Te/ Shui Ta, of the Bertolt Brecht play The Good Person of Szechwan and played the lead in the Traverse Theatre production of Douglas Maxwell's Melody. Vocally, she has numerous credits for radio works and played Mac in the films Chicken Run and Chicken Run: Dawn of the Nugget. For TV she performed regular parts for the Channel 4, comedy drama No Angels and Ben Elton's BBC1 sitcom Blessed, as well as appearances in The Catherine Tate Show and The Bill amongst others.

=== As herself ===
Ferguson has presented a number of programmes including, Doing the Festival for STV and XS, an arts programme, for the BBC. In addition she has been a contestant on the challenging BBC Radio 4 panel game shows Just a Minute, Loose Ends and Banter. In April and September 2008 she made guest appearances on her brother Craig's talk show, The Late Late Show with Craig Ferguson.

== Personal life ==
She is married to Mark Tweddle, a civil servant and previously a management consultant. The couple have two children as of July 2008.
