= Arthur Maclean =

Scottish Anglican bishop (1858–1943)

The Most Reverend Arthur Maclean
- Bishop of Moray, Ross and Caithness; Primus of the Scottish Episcopal Church
- Church: Scottish Episcopal Church
- Diocese: Moray, Ross and Caithness
- Appointed: 1904
- In office: 1904–1943
- Predecessor: James Kelly
- Successor: Peter Wilson
- Other post: Primus of the Scottish Episcopal Church (1935–1943)

Orders
- Ordination: June 1883
- Consecration: 21 December 1904 by George Wilkinson

Personal details
- Born: 6 July 1858 Bath, Somerset, England
- Died: 24 February 1943 (aged 84) Inverness, Scotland
- Buried: Tomnahurich Cemetery
- Denomination: Anglican
- Parents: A. J. Macleane & Sarah Hutchings
- Spouse: Eva Maclean

Arthur John Maclean (6 July 1858 – 24 February 1943) was an Anglican bishop in the later decades of the 19th century and first four of the 20th century.

Maclean was born into an ecclesiastical family. His father, the Rev Arthur J. Macleane (he later dropped the final "e" from the surname), began a career in the East India Company before returning to England, obtaining a degree from Trinity College, Cambridge, being ordained and securing appointment as inaugural Principal of Brighton College (1846–51). He held two subsequent headships and was editor of various Classical texts, especially Horace and Juvenal.

Maclean was educated at Eton College and King's College, Cambridge. He was ordained in 1882 and he was head of the Archbishop of Canterbury's Assyrian Mission from 1886 to 1891 and then Rector of Portree. In 1882 he became Dean of Argyll and The Isles and after this was Rector of Selkirk before a spell as Principal of the Scottish Episcopal Theological College and then a nearly 40 years episcopacy as Bishop of Moray, Ross and Caithness. Late in his life he was additionally elected Primus of the Scottish Episcopal Church. An eminent author, he died on 24 February 1943.

== Writings ==
- Grammar of the Dialects of Vernacular Syriac, 1895
- Dictionary of the Dialects of Vernacular Syriac, 1901
- The Ancient Church Orders, 1910
- The Didache, 1922

== Sources ==
- J.F.Coakley. The Church of the East and the Church of England:a history of the Archbishop of Canterbury's Assyrian Mission, Oxford, 1992.

Religious titles
Preceded by Reginald John Mapleton	Dean of Argyll and The Isles; 1892 – 1897	Succeeded by Charles Pressley Smith
Preceded by James Butler Knill Kelly	Bishop of Moray, Ross and Caithness; 1904 – 1943	Succeeded by Piers Holt Wilson
Preceded by Walter Robberds	Primus of the Scottish Episcopal Church; 1935–1943	Succeeded by Ernest Danson
