= John Ferguson (priest) =

John Ferguson (died 22 April 1902) was an Anglican priest who served as Dean of Moray, Ross and Caithness 1886–1902.

== Biography ==
Ferguson was educated at Trinity College, Glenalmond and Aberdeen University, where he received an MA in 1848. He became deacon, and served for three years as Curate of St Mary, Montrose. In 1853 he was ordained as priest, and appointed Rector of Holy Trinity, Elgin, which he held for nearly 50 years. He was appointed chaplain to the Earl of Fife in 1856, synod clerk in 1874, and diocesan inspector in 1878. From 1881 to 1885 he was examining chaplain to Bishop Eden of Moray, and the following year he was appointed to the same position for his successor Bishop Kelly. In 1886, he became Dean of the United Diocese of Moray, Ross, and Caithness, a post he held until his death.

He died at the Deanery, Elgin, on 22 April 1902.

== Notes ==
Religious titles
Preceded by William Christie	Dean of Moray, Ross and Caithness; 1886 to 1902	Succeeded by John Archibald
