= Peter Wilson (bishop) =

British Anglican bishop

The Right Reverend Peter Wilson
- Bishop of Moray, Ross and Caithness
- Church: Scottish Episcopal Church
- Diocese: Moray, Ross and Caithness
- Elected: 8 April 1943
- In office: 1943–1953
- Predecessor: Arthur Maclean
- Successor: Duncan MacInnes
- Previous posts: Dean of Saint Andrews, Dunkeld and Dunblane (1940–1943)

Orders
- Ordination: 1909
- Consecration: 1943

Personal details
- Born: 1 January 1883 Redgrave, Suffolk, England
- Died: 3 February 1956 (aged 73) St Andrews, Scotland
- Buried: Tomnahurich Cemetery
- Denomination: Anglican
- Parents: George Holt Wilson & Lucinda James
- Spouse: Ella Wilson
- Children: 2
- Education: Oriel College, Oxford

Piers Holt Wilson (known as Peter; January 1883 – 3 February 1956) was an Anglican bishop in the mid part of the 20th century.

== Early years and education ==
Wilson was born in Redgrave Hall, Redgrave, Suffolk, England to George Holt Wilson and Lucinda James. After the death of his mother when he was 3 years old, he was brought up by his sister Evelyn. He was educated at Sherborne School and Oriel College, Oxford. After studying at Oxford, he taught in a Prep School for boys. He entered Wells Theological College situated in Wells after he was ordained in 1909. He was a curate in Kettering, a town in the northern part of Northamptonshire. He was one of 7 curates to the vicar the Reverend Patrick Smythe. He became priest-in-charge of All Saints St Andrews in 1920 and later rector in 1930. In 1940 he was appointed Dean of the Diocese of Saint Andrews, Dunkeld and Dunblane.

== Bishop ==
On April 8, 1943, he was elected as Bishop of Moray, Ross and Caithness, succeeding Bishop Arthur Maclean. He was enthroned as bishop on 29 June 1943 by the Primus of the Scottish Episcopal Church the Most Reverend Logie Danson. Bishop Wilson retired as Bishop of Moray, Ross and Caithness in 1953. He settled back in St Andrews. He died in 1956.

== WWI ==
As soon as World War I began in August 1914, Wilson enlisted. He served in the Royal Army Medical Corps from 1914 to 1915, first as a stretcher-bearer then later as a Chaplain in the disastrous Gallipoli Campaign of 1915. After serving with the Royal Army Medical Corps, Wilson entered the Royal Army Service Corps then, from 1916 to 1919, he served as a chaplain in the Royal Armed Forces. He was mentioned in dispatches and awarded the military O.B.E. for his part in evacuating people from an airfield in France. He received a letter signed by Winston Churchill.

== Marriage ==
Wilson married the widow of his friend who had died during WWI in 1915. Wilson married Ella Lee in 1920 and went to live in St Andrews after he was appointed rector of All Saints by his former vicar and by then Dean of St Ninian's Cathedral in Perth, Patrick Smythe.

== Notes ==
Anglican Communion titles
| Preceded by William Gwyther | Dean of St Andrews, Dunkeld and Dunblane; 1940 –1943 | Succeeded by William Shaw Andrew |
| Preceded by Arthur Maclean | Bishop of Moray, Ross and Caithness; 1943 –1952 | Succeeded by Duncan MacInnes |
