= William Gow =

William Connell Gow (6 January 1909 – 4 October 1996) was an eminent Anglican priest in the second half of the 20th century.

He was born on 6 January 1909, educated at Edinburgh Theological College and ordained in 1937. He was Curate at St Mary Magdalene Dundee and was then Rector of St James, Dingwall with St Anne, Strathpeffer from 1940. He was Dean of Moray, Ross and Caithness from 1960 until 1977. He died on 4 October 1996.

== Notes ==
Religious titles
Preceded by Clarence Wolfe	Dean of Moray, Ross and Caithness; 1960 to 1977	Succeeded by Iain McHardy
