= Len Black =

British priest

The Reverend Len Black
- Born: Leonard Albert Black; 19 March 1949 (age 77)
- Education: Edinburgh Theological College
- Occupation: Priest

Ecclesiastical career
- Religion: Christianity
- Church: Scottish Episcopal Church (1973-2011); Roman Catholic Church (2011-)
- Ordained: 1973 (Anglican priest); 2011 (Catholic priest)
- Congregations served: St Margaret of Scotland, Aberdeen; St Paul's Cathedral, Dundee; St Michael & All Angels, Inverness; St John the Evangelist, Inverness

Leonard Albert Black (born 19 March 1949) is a Roman Catholic priest in Scotland and a member of the Personal Ordinariate of Our Lady of Walsingham. He was formerly an Anglican priest in the Scottish Episcopal Church.

== Early life and education ==
Black was born on 19 March 1949. He was educated at the Bernard Gilpin Society, in Durham, England; this was an organisation that helped men achieve the academic qualifications required to study for ordination. He then trained for ordination at the Edinburgh Theological College.

== Ordained ministry ==
=== Anglicanism ===
Black was ordained in the Scottish Episcopal Church as a deacon in 1972 and as a priest in 1973. He was curate at St Margaret of Scotland, Aberdeen and then chaplain of St Paul's Cathedral, Dundee. From 1977 to 1980 he was priest in charge of St Ninian's, Aberdeen, and then became rector of St Michael & All Angels, Inverness, and St John the Evangelist, Inverness in 1980.

In 1987, Black resigned as rector of St John the Evangelist, Inverness, to take up a part-time appointment as Religious and Community Programmes producer at Moray Firth Radio in Inverness. He also served as Area Chaplain for Scotland of the Actors Church Union from 1987 to 2003 and synod clerk of the Moray, Ross and Caithness from 1992 to 2003. He was regional dean for Scotland of Forward in Faith, a traditionalist Anglo-Catholic organisation, from 2001 to 2011. He was dean of Moray, Ross and Caithness from 2003 to 2009.

=== Roman Catholic Church ===
He resigned as rector of St Michael and All Angels, Inverness, in March 2011 and, accompanied by a group of lay people, became part of the Personal Ordinariate of Our Lady of Walsingham. They were received into the Catholic Church on Easter Eve 2011, and so Black became a Catholic layman.

Black undertook the ordinariate formation for Catholic priesthood at Allen Hall Seminary in London, and was then ordained priest by Bishop Philip Tartaglia (Archbishop of Glasgow 2012 to 2021) in July 2011. He now serves as senior pastor to the ordinariate members in Scotland.

During Covid-related lockdowns, Black transformed a shed in his garden in Inverness into "The Oratory of St Joseph" and livestreamed Mass to his small congregation. The shed was shortlisted for "Cuprinol Shed Of The Year".

== Author ==
Black is also an author, among other books he has written Sir Ninian Comper - Liturgical Architect (1999), The Church that Moved Across the Water (2003) and Churches of the Diocese of Moray, Ross and Caithness (2004). In 2011 he became part of the editorial team of The Portal magazine, the official monthly magazine of the Personal Ordinariate of Our Lady of Walsingham.

== Personal life ==
In 1975, Black married Ruth. Together they have three children; two sons and one daughter.

Religious titles
Preceded by Michael Hickford	Dean of Moray, Ross and Caithness; 2003 to 2009	Succeeded by Cliff Piper
