= Robin Forrest =

British priest (born 1933)

The Rev. Canon Robin Whyte Forrest (born 1933) is a former eminent Anglican priest of the second half of the 20th century.

He was born in 1933, educated at Edinburgh Theological College and ordained in 1962. He was Curate at St Mary, Glasgow and then held incumbencies at Renfrew, Motherwell, Wishaw and Nairn. He was Dean of Moray, Ross and Caithness from 1992 to 1998.

== Notes ==
Religious titles
Preceded by John Paul	Dean of Moray, Ross and Caithness; 1992 to 1998	Succeeded by Michael Hickford
