= Stewart Mallin =

The Rev. Canon Stewart Adam Thomson Mallin (12 August 1924 – 21 January 2000) was an eminent Anglican priest in the second half of the 20th century.

== Biography ==
Mallin was born on 12 August 1924, educated at Lasswade Secondary School and Edinburgh Theological College and ordained in 1962. He was Curate at St Andrew's Cathedral, Inverness and was then an itinerant Priest in the Diocese of Moray, Ross and Caithness until 1968. He was Priest in Charge of St Peter and the Holy Rood, Thurso, and St John's, Wick from 1968 until 1977. After this he was Rector of St James, Dingwall and St Anne's, Strathpeffer. He was Dean of Moray, Ross and Caithness from 1983 until 1991. He died on 21 January 2000.

== Notes ==
Religious titles
Preceded by Cyril Barnes	Dean of Moray, Ross and Caithness; 1983 to 1991	Succeeded by John Paul
