= Cyril Barnes =

Anglican priest (1926–2000)

Cyril Arthur Barnes (1926–2000) was an eminent Anglican priest in the second half of the 20th century.

He was born on 10 January 1926, educated at Penistone Grammar School and Edinburgh Theological College and ordained after national service with the King's Own Scottish Borderers in 1950. He was Curate at St John's, Aberdeen and was then Rector of St John's, Forres until 1955. He was Priest in Charge at St John the Evangelist, Wentbridge and then Vicar of St Bartholomew's, Ripponden with St John's, Rishworth until 1967. After this he was Rector of Christ Church, Huntly with St Marnan's, Aberchirder and Holy Trinity, Keith. He was Dean of Moray, Ross and Caithness from 1980 until 1983. He died on 21 January 2000.

== Notes ==
Religious titles
Preceded by Iain McHardy	Dean of Moray, Ross and Caithness; 1980–1983	Succeeded by Stewart Mallin
