= Duncan MacInnes =

Scottish Anglican bishop

The Right Reverend Duncan MacInnes MBE, MC
- Bishop of Moray, Ross and Caithness
- Church: Scottish Episcopal Church
- Diocese: Moray, Ross and Caithness
- Elected: 1952
- In office: 1953-1970
- Predecessor: Piers Holt Wilson
- Successor: George Sessford

Orders
- Ordination: 1927
- Consecration: 13 January 1953

Personal details
- Born: 1897
- Died: 9 August 1970 (aged 73)
- Denomination: Anglican
- Education: Edinburgh Theological College

Duncan MacInnes MBE, MC (1897 – 9 August 1970) was a Scottish Anglican bishop in the 20th century.

== Biography ==
MacInnes was educated at Edinburgh Theological College and ordained in 1927. He began his ordained ministry with a curacy at St Columba's Clydebank, after which he was curate in charge of Knightswood. He was a chaplain to the British Armed Forces during World War II and then Dean of Argyll and The Isles. In 1953 he became the Bishop of Moray, Ross and Caithness, a post he held until his death in 1970. The eleven bells of Inverness Cathedral were restored as a memorial to Bishop Macinnes.

Religious titles
Preceded by James Courtney Bevin	Dean of Argyll and The Isles; 1946 – 1953	Succeeded by George James Cosmo Douglas
Preceded by Piers Holt Wilson	Bishop of Moray, Ross and Caithness; 1953 – 1970	Succeeded by George Minshull Sessford
