= John Paul (priest) =

The Rev. Canon John Douglas Paul , was an eminent Anglican priest in the second half of the 20th century.

== Life ==
He was born on 13 September 1928, educated at Winchester College and the University of Edinburgh and ordained in 1954. He was Curate at The Ascension, Portsmouth and was then a missionary in Mozambique for over 20 years, finally becoming Archdeacon of the country. After this he held incumbencies at Castle Douglas, Portobello and Elgin. He was Dean of Moray, Ross and Caithness from 1991 to 1992. He died on 23 September 2009.

== Notes ==
Religious titles
Preceded by Stewart Mallin	Dean of Moray, Ross and Caithness; 1991 to 1992	Succeeded by Robin Forrest
