= Dame Allan's School =

Coordinates: 54.982°N 1.652°W

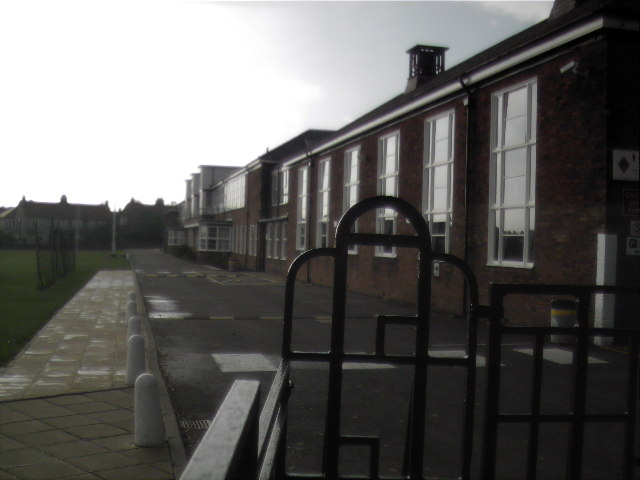
- The current building in Fenham in use by the school since 1935

Location
- Fowberry Crescent; Newcastle upon Tyne, NE4 9YJ; United Kingdom

Information
- Type: Private day school
- Religious affiliation: Church of England
- Established: 1705; 321 years ago
- Founder: Dame Eleanor Allan
- Local authority: Newcastle upon Tyne
- Principal: Will Scott
- Head of Junior School: Geoff Laidler
- Gender: Coeducational; single-sex (Senior School)
- Age: 3 to 18
- Enrolment: approx. 1250
- Colour
- Former pupils: Old Allanians
- Website: www.dameallans.co.uk

Dame Allan's Schools is a collection of private day schools in Fenham, in the west end of Newcastle upon Tyne, England. It comprises a Junior School, Senior School and a Sixth Form. Founded in 1705 as a charity, the original schools are two of the oldest schools in the city. It was originally founded to provide education for "40 poor boys and 20 poor girls of the parishes of St Nicholas and St John" and now charges £5,607 per term (Junior School) and £6,901 per term (Secondary School and Sixth Form) for pupils to attend. Scholarships of up to 50% are available on the basis of academic merit, and bursaries of up to 100% are available on the basis of academic merit and financial need.

== History ==
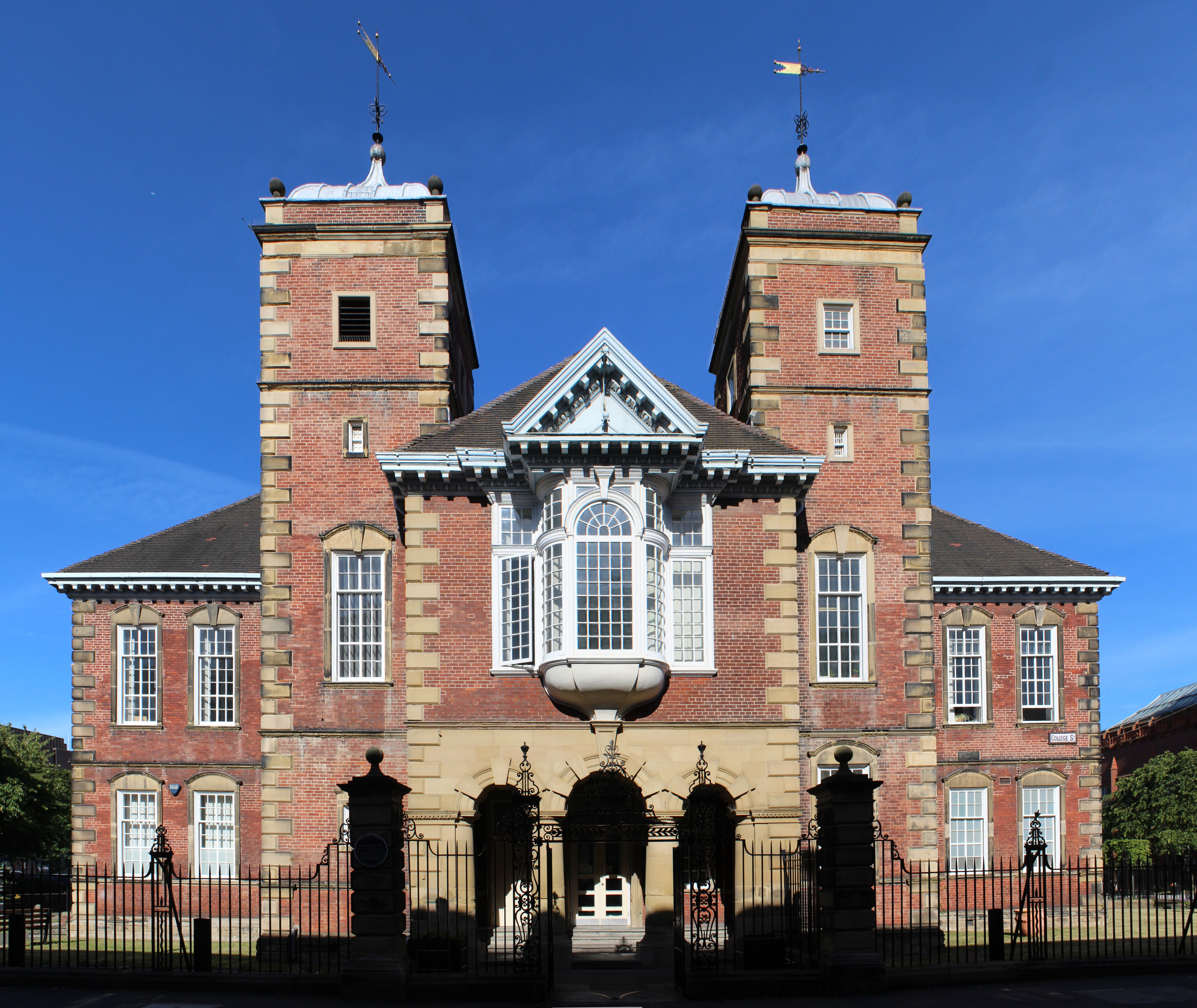
The building in College Street in use by the school from 1883 to 1935; now part of Northumbria University.

They were founded by Dame Eleanor Allan, the daughter of a local goldsmith and the widow of a tobacco merchant, to provide a proper education for "40 poor boys and 20 poor girls of the parishes of St Nicholas and St John". The schools were endowed with land at Wallsend, to the east of Newcastle. The original school seems likely to have been near St Nicholas's Church, and certainly was by 1778. It moved to Manor Chare near All Saints' Church in 1786, to Carliol Square in 1821, to Rosemary Lane off Pudding Chare in 1861, and to Hanover Square in 1875. The school then moved to College Street in Newcastle in 1883 and remained there until 1935 when it re-located to the present site in Fenham.

Until 1988 the schools operated as separate boys' and girls' schools with a joint governing body. The governors then took the decision to appoint a principal with overall responsibility for the management of the two schools. At the same time, they set up a joint mixed sixth form and reintroduced a mixed junior school. In effect, Dame Allan's consisted of four different schools: the co-educational Junior school for nursery to Year 6 are located in a separate building in Spital Tongues; the single sex boys' and girls' schools for years 7 to 11; and the co-educational sixth form (years 12 to 13).

In 1994, an early day motion was brought before the UK Parliament citing incidences of racially motivated bullying at the school.

In 2022, the schools introduced a therapy dog to support pupils through exams and stress. They also started a series of speaker events for pupils and their families. Since the start of this programme, lectures have featured figures like Dragons' Den judge Sara Davies and historian Lucy Worsley.

As of 2023, the schools were offering their pupils screening for colour blindness.

Dame Allan's was named 'Independent School of the Year' in The Sunday Times Parent Power Guide in 2023.

In 2023, Robert Johnson, who taught at Dame Allan's for over a decade, was found guilty of making indecent photographs of children between 2009 and 2020. He was sentenced to one year in jail and banned from teaching for life.

In 2024, the school appointed an artificial intelligence lead, a position believed to be the first of its kind in a north east school.

Staff walked-out in a dispute over pensions in March 2024: the school subsequently made an improved offer.

In 2024, Dame Allan's set up a rowing programme, known as Dame Allan's Boat Club. This was in partnership with Tyne United Rowing Club.

In 2025, the schools started an 'Endangered Instruments Programme', using funding from a former pupil, which supports pupils to learn an instrument that is in danger of dying out in orchestras.

In 2025, it was announced that the school was to abandon the diamond structure and go fully coeducational, with the incoming Years 7-10 becoming coeducational in September 2026 and the incoming Year 11 adopting the change in September 2027. Some parents were opposed to the changes. In 2025, the school also received approval from Newcastle City Council to begin construction of a new, full sized hockey pitch.

== Facilities ==
A number of classrooms were built between 2004 and 2005 to replace older facilities, with some intended specifically for the sixth form centre. The sixth form centre was opened by Elizabeth II during an official visit on 14 October 2005 and was named the Queen's Building.

In 2012 a nursery and junior school were opened in Spital Tongues.

In 2015, Dame Allan's was awarded £250,000 to help fund a £500,000 project. The grant was given by the Reece Foundation which promotes the improvement of education in engineering, technology and related subjects.

In 2022 Dame Allan's Schools opened the Jubilee Building. The £8 million development consists of an art exhibition space, science labs, a design technology space for sixth formers, as well as modern foreign language, art and maths classrooms.

The Queen’s Building was refurbished in 2024, adding a second storey, new classrooms, a silent study area, and a café space.

== Academics ==
Being a private school, Dame Allan's does not strictly adhere to the National Curriculum. It does enter all its students in public examinations such as GCSEs and A-levels. All students must study English, mathematics, and the sciences to GCSE level, and it is strongly recommended that at least one foreign language be studied to this level. Sixth form students have a wider range of study, with no mandatory subjects and the introduction of many new subjects in year 12, including A-levels in politics, psychology, sports, business and theatre studies. Dame Allan's is an Anglican school.

In 2025, almost 80% of all A level grades were A*–B. Of all exams sat by Year 13 pupils, 78.3% achieved grades A*–B – the second-highest figure since 2005 (excluding Covid years) – and 47.6% were awarded the top A* or A grade.

In 2025, more than a quarter (25.5%) of all GCSE grades awarded were at the highest level, grade 9. Nine pupils achieved nine grade 9s, while in total 61.8% of all exams sat were awarded the top grades 9–7, the equivalent of the old A* and A.

In recent inspections, the school has been praised by both the Independent Schools Inspectorate (ISI) and The Good Schools Guide. The ISI inspection in 2023 stated: "A challenging broad curriculum, enhanced by a wide range of co-curricular activities and extensive opportunities in sports, promote pupils' health and emotional wellbeing." In their review in 2023, The Good Schools Guide said: "No arrogance or entitlement among students here, just pride in their school and gratitude for their opportunities."

== Notable former pupils ==
Former pupils are known as Old Allanians.

- Fenwick Allison, rugby union player
- John Crook, former Bishop of Moray, Ross and Caithness
- Myra Curtis, Principal of Newnham College, Cambridge
- Margaret Dale, dancer and television producer
- Elizabeth Fallaize, Pro-Vice-Chancellor (Education), University of Oxford
- Marian Foster, broadcaster
- Edward Hinds FRS, professor of physics
- Vick Hope, TV and radio presenter
- Ian La Frenais, writer
- David Leon, actor
- Sir David Lumsden, Choirmaster, organist and harpsichordist; former Principal of the Royal Academy of Music
- Philip Nicholson, Northumberland cricketer
- Sebastian Payne, journalist
- Peter Pilkington, Conservative Peer and former chairman of the Broadcasting Complaints Commission
- Varada Sethu, actor.
- Keith Wrightson, Randolph W. Townsend Professor of History, Yale University, since 2004.
