= George Sessford =

British bishop

The Right Reverend George Sessford
- Bishop of Moray, Ross and Caithness
- Church: Scottish Episcopal Church
- Diocese: Moray, Ross and Caithness
- Appointed: 1970
- In office: 1970–1993
- Predecessor: Duncan MacInnes
- Successor: Gregor MacGregor

Orders
- Ordination: 1954
- Consecration: 1970

Personal details
- Born: 7 November 1928 Aintree, England
- Died: 21 July 1996 (aged 67)
- Denomination: Anglican
- Children: 3

George Minshull Sessford (7 November 1928 - 21 July 1996) was Bishop of Moray, Ross and Caithness in the second half of the 20th century.

== Biography ==
George was born in Aintree and educated at St Andrews University. After a period of study at Lincoln Theological College, he was ordained in 1954. His first posts were as curate at St Mary's Cathedral, Glasgow and chaplain of the city's university. He was Priest in charge of Cumbernauld New Town from 1958 to 1966 and Rector of Forres until his elevation to the episcopate. He is survived by three daughters, four grandchildren and four great grandchildren.

== Notes ==
Religious titles
Preceded by Duncan MacInnes	Bishop of Moray, Ross and Caithness; 1970 –1993	Succeeded by Gregor MacGregor
