= Iain McHardy =

Iain William Thomson Duff McHardy (31 October 1913 – 21 January 2000), was an eminent Anglican priest in the second half of the 20th century. He was born in 1913, educated at the University of St Andrews and ordained in 1938. He held curacies at South Kirkby, Dunblane and then Cantley until 1952. He was Priest in Charge at St Ninian, Inverness from then until 1974 when he became Rector of St Andrew, Fortrose. He was Dean of Moray, Ross and Caithness from 1977 until 1980. He died on 21 January 2000.

== Notes ==
Religious titles
Preceded by William Gow	Dean of Moray, Ross and Caithness; 1977 to 1980	Succeeded by Cyril Barnes
