= Walter Jenks =

Walter Jenks (26 May 1864 – 29 March 1935) was an eminent Anglican priest in the first half of the 20th century. He was born in Lambeth on 26 May 1864, educated at King's College London and ordained in 1888. He held curacies at North Molton and Chipping Barnet, where he was curate in charge of St. Peter's, Arkley. After this he was Assistant Missioner for the Diocese of St Albans and then Priest in charge of St Margaret's, Aberlour. He was Rector of St Ninian's, Glen Urquhart from 1928 (and Dean of Moray, Ross and Caithness from 1932) until his death on 29 March 1935.

== Notes ==
Religious titles
Preceded by Leofric Hay-Dinwoody	Dean of Moray, Ross and Caithness; 1932 to 1935	Succeeded by Charles Robertson
