= John Archibald (priest) =

Scottish Anglican priest (1840–1915)

John Archibald (1 May 1840 – 10 September 1915) was a Scottish Anglican priest and author.

He was born in Inveresk near Musselburgh, educated at Trinity College, Glenalmond and Aberdeen University and ordained in 1870. He was Curate of St John's Church, Darwen then the incumbent at St John's Church, Wick. In 1876, he became Rector of Trinity Episcopal Church, Keith, and later a Canon of Inverness Cathedral. He was appointed Dean of Moray, Ross, and Caithness in May 1902.

He retired in 1912 and died in Birmingham, England, aged 75.

Religious titles
Preceded by John Ferguson	Dean of Moray, Ross and Caithness; 1902 to 1912	Succeeded by Hay Wilson
