= Gregor MacGregor (bishop) =

Scottish bishop

The Right Reverend Gregor MacGregor
- Bishop of Moray, Ross and Caithness
- Church: Scottish Episcopal Church
- Diocese: Moray, Ross and Caithness
- Appointed: 1994
- In office: 1994–1998
- Predecessor: George Sessford
- Successor: John Crook

Orders
- Ordination: 1977
- Consecration: 1994

Personal details
- Born: 17 November 1933 Glasgow, Scotland
- Died: 29 June 2003 (aged 69) Edinburgh, Scotland
- Denomination: Anglican (prev. Presbyterian)
- Spouse: Elizabeth MacGregor
- Children: 4
- Education: University of St Andrews

Gregor MacGregor (17 November 1933 – 29 June 2003) was Bishop of Moray, Ross and Caithness in the second half of the 20th century.

== Education ==
MacGregor was educated at Hutchesons' Boys' Grammar School in Glasgow, where he became Dux, he went on to serve in the Royal Navy, gaining a commission as a sub-lieutenant in the RNVR. After this he did an MA in social science at University of St Andrews. After graduation he did a Bachelor of Divinity at St Mary's College to train as a minister for the Church of Scotland.

== Ministry ==
After he finished his studies in 1967, he was stationed as a Church of Scotland minister in Stromness, Orkney, set with the task of uniting two congregations. Whilst there, he became acquainted with the Scottish Episcopal Church. After much thought he left Orkney in 1972 and commenced training for the Episcopal priesthood in Dumfries and Galloway. Later he moved to Fife where he became a specialist in religious education at Glenrothes High School. He continued his training for the priesthood in the Diocese of St Andrews, Dunkeld and Dunblane. He was ordained deacon and priest in 1977 and was given charge of the parish of Elie and Earlsferry in the East Neuk of Fife. In 1981 he became Rector of Glenrothes while in 1986 he was appointed Provost of the Cathedral of The Isles. However, this was not satisfying to him and consequently returned to the Diocese of St Andrews, Dunkeld and Dunblane and became rector of Dollar, Clackmannanshire where he founded a group of fellow Franciscan Tertiaries. After this he became Mission Priest at St Luke's in Wester Hailes until his elevation to the episcopate.

== Episcopacy ==
On 3 May 1994 MacGregor was elected Bishop of Moray, Ross and Caithness, a post he held for 4 years, when he resigned in 1998 after feeling that his use as Bishop of the Diocese was completed. He returned to Edinburgh, where he remained for the remaining years of his life. Five years prior to his death, he suffered a stroke which left him disabled. He died on 29 June 2003 in Ferryfield Nursing Home in Edinburgh.

== Notes ==
Religious titles
Preceded by George Minshull Sessford	Bishop of Moray, Ross and Caithness; 1994–1998	Succeeded by John Michael Crook
