= Charles Pressley Smith =

Anglican priest

Charles Pressley Smith was an Anglican priest.

Born into an ecclesiastical family in Fraserburgh in 1862, he was educated at Aberdeen University and ordained after a period of study at Edinburgh Theological College in 1885. Initially, he was a Curate at Edinburgh Cathedral and then Priest in charge of St Martin's, Edinburgh. He was Rector of St John's, Oban and in 1897 became its Dean until 1987, a post he held until 1930. He died on 9 September 1935.

== Notes ==
Religious titles
Preceded by Arthur John Maclean	Dean of Argyll and The Isles; 1897 – 1930	Succeeded by Alexander Stewart MacInnes
