= Clarence Wolfe =

English Anglican priest

Clarence Albert Edward Wolfe , MBE was an eminent Anglican priest in the mid 20th century. He was born on 24 February 1892, educated at Slade Grammar School, Bolton and Manchester University and ordained in 1917. He held curacies at Cheetham and St Annes-on-Sea. After this he was Chaplain of his old school,. He was Vicar of St Bartholomew's, Bolton after which he was Rector of St Margaret's, Aberlour. He was Dean of Moray, Ross and Caithness from 1946 until 1960.

He was the subject of This Is Your Life in 1960 when he was surprised by Eamonn Andrews at the BBC Television Theatre.

His last post was as Vicar of Glasson. He died on 2 February 1967.

== Notes ==
Religious titles
Preceded by Charles Robertson	Dean of Moray, Ross and Caithness; 1946 to 1960	Succeeded by William Gow
