= Bishop of Ross =

The Bishop of Ross can refer to:

- Bishop of Ross (Ireland), one of the historical episcopal sees of Ireland.
- Bishop of Ross (Scotland) one of the historical episcopal sees of Scotland.

== See also ==
- Bishop of Cork, Cloyne and Ross (Ireland)
- Bishop of Cork and Ross (Ireland)
- Bishop of Moray, Ross and Caithness (Scotland)
