= Charles Robertson (priest) =

Charles Robert Robertson (28 September 1873 – 16 December 1946) was an eminent Anglican priest in the first half of the 20th century.

Robertson was born on 28 September 1873, educated at Durham School and Durham University, and ordained in 1896. He held curacies in Glasgow, Bamburgh and Dumbarton; and incumbencies in Dumbarton, Fort William, Greenock and Dumfries. He was Dean of Moray, Ross and Caithness from 1935 until 1946. His last post was as Vicar of Glasson.He died on 2 February 1967.

Religious titles
Preceded by Walter Jenks	Dean of Moray, Ross and Caithness; 1935–1946	Succeeded by Clarence Wolfe
