= William Christie (dean of Moray, Ross and Caithness) =

William Christie (26 January 1817 – 12 December 1885) was a Scottish clergyman, inaugural Dean of the United Diocese of Moray, Ross, and Caithness, having been the Dean of Ross since 1860.

== Life ==
Christie was born in Monquhitter, the son of William Christie, dancing-master of Monquhitter, and his wife Mary (née Guthrie). He studied at King's College, Aberdeen. In addition to his ecclesiastical achievements, he was a folk song collector who published two volumes of songs entitled Traditional Ballad Airs, in 1876 and 1881.

== Death ==
He died in Fochabers.

Religious titles
New office	Dean of Moray, Ross and Caithness; 1864–1885	Succeeded by John Ferguson
