= Hay Wilson =

Anglican priest

William Hay Wilson was an eminent Anglican priest in the first quarter of the 20th century.

== Life ==
He was educated at the University of Edinburgh and ordained in 1885. He was Chaplain at Inverness Cathedral then Rector of St James’ Church, Dingwall. He was Dean of Moray, Ross and Caithness from 1912 until his death on 7 October 1925. His wife died three years later.

Religious titles
Preceded by John Archibald	Dean of Moray, Ross and Caithness; 1912 to 1925	Succeeded by Leofric Hay-Dinwoody
