= Philip Nicholson =

Philip Nicholson may refer to:

- Philip Nicholson (cricketer) (born 1973), English cricketer
- A. J. Quinnell, the pen name of the English thriller novelist Philip Nicholson
- Phil Nicholson (born 1951), Australian astronomer
