= Cliff Piper =

Clifford John Piper is the current dean of Moray, Ross and Caithness, a position he has held since 2009.

He was born in Tintagel, Cornwall, on 8 April 1953, educated at Aberdeen University and pursued a career in social work until the early nineties. After a period of study at the Theological Institute of the Scottish Episcopal Church he was ordained in 1993. He was an assistant curate at St Ninian's, Invergordon, and then priest in charge of St Andrew's, Tain. He was then a canon at St Andrew's Cathedral, Inverness from 2000 until his appointment as Dean of Moray, Ross and Caithness in 2009.

== Notes ==
Religious titles
| Preceded by Len Black | Dean of Moray, Ross and Caithness; 2009 to | Succeeded by Current incumbent |
