= Lasswade High School Centre =

Coordinates: 55.87378°N 3.1172°W

Lasswade High School

Location
- 11 Eskdale Drive; Bonnyrigg, Midlothian, EH19 2LA; Scotland

Information
- Type: State secondary
- Motto: Usque Conabor (I will strive to my utmost)
- Established: 17th century
- Head teacher: Campbell Hornell
- Faculty: 150+
- Years: S1 to S6
- Enrollment: 1,500
- Houses: St. Leonard's, St. Anne's, Mount Esk and Melville
- Colour: Strictly Black or White with school tie or school logo
- School Tie Colours: St Leonard's: black tie with green stripes St Anne's: black tie with red stripes Mount Esk: black tie with gold stripes Melville: black tie with blue stripes
- Website: lasswadehsc.mgfl.net

Lasswade High School is a non-denominational secondary state school in Bonnyrigg, Midlothian, Scotland. It has a roll in excess of 1500 students. The school's catchment area covers the towns of Bonnyrigg, Loanhead, Rosewell and surrounding villages.

== History ==
A parish school was first established in the village of Lasswade in 1615, run by the schoolmaster, Andrew Watson, from a cottage at the mouth of the Spout Burn. Over the following two-and-a-half centuries the school was administered with assistance from the kirk session. One of the most notable schoolmasters during this period was the poet and scholar William Tennant, who was appointed in 1816 and subsequently became Professor of Oriental Languages at the University of St Andrews. In the 1860s and 1870s, under the aegis of Robert Marshall, the school acquired a reputation for excellence as a higher-grade school, at a time when elementary education was made compulsory for all children between the ages of 5 and 13.

From this era onwards, the school frequently sought to cater for increasing pupil numbers by building new accommodation. In 1843 a two-room schoolhouse was opened, which the New Statistical Account of Scotland described as "a spacious and elegant building" where Latin, Greek, French and mathematics were taught (albeit at a fee that was "very considerable in amount"). Nearly forty years later, in 1881, the school moved premises to a much larger building at the top of School Brae, where the secondary-level pupils were instructed separately from the younger cohorts. In 1956, Lasswade Senior Secondary School (as it was now known) transferred to yet another new building, this time located in the nearby town of Bonnyrigg, with improvements and extensions opened in 1978 to provide classrooms for the Business Studies, Home Economics, Music, Art & Design, Science and Craft, Design & Technology departments, as well as a Library, Computer Room, Kitchen, Dining Room and Sports Centre. Lasswade was further developed as a community school in 1979, and a new Mathematics and Support wing was formally opened by the Education Minister, Jack McConnell, in 2000.

In 2009 it was announced that a new Lasswade High School Community Campus was to be built, with construction beginning in October 2011 on the site of the old school's playing fields. The school re-opened in 2013 as the Lasswade Centre, with ceremonial duties performed by the then First Minister of Scotland, Alex Salmond. The new building cost £38 million to complete, and contains 90 classrooms to accommodate around 1,500 pupils. The facility also has a purpose-built Sports Centre, which comprises a games hall, squash courts, fitness training rooms, activity movement studio, cafeteria, creche and spacious playing fields.

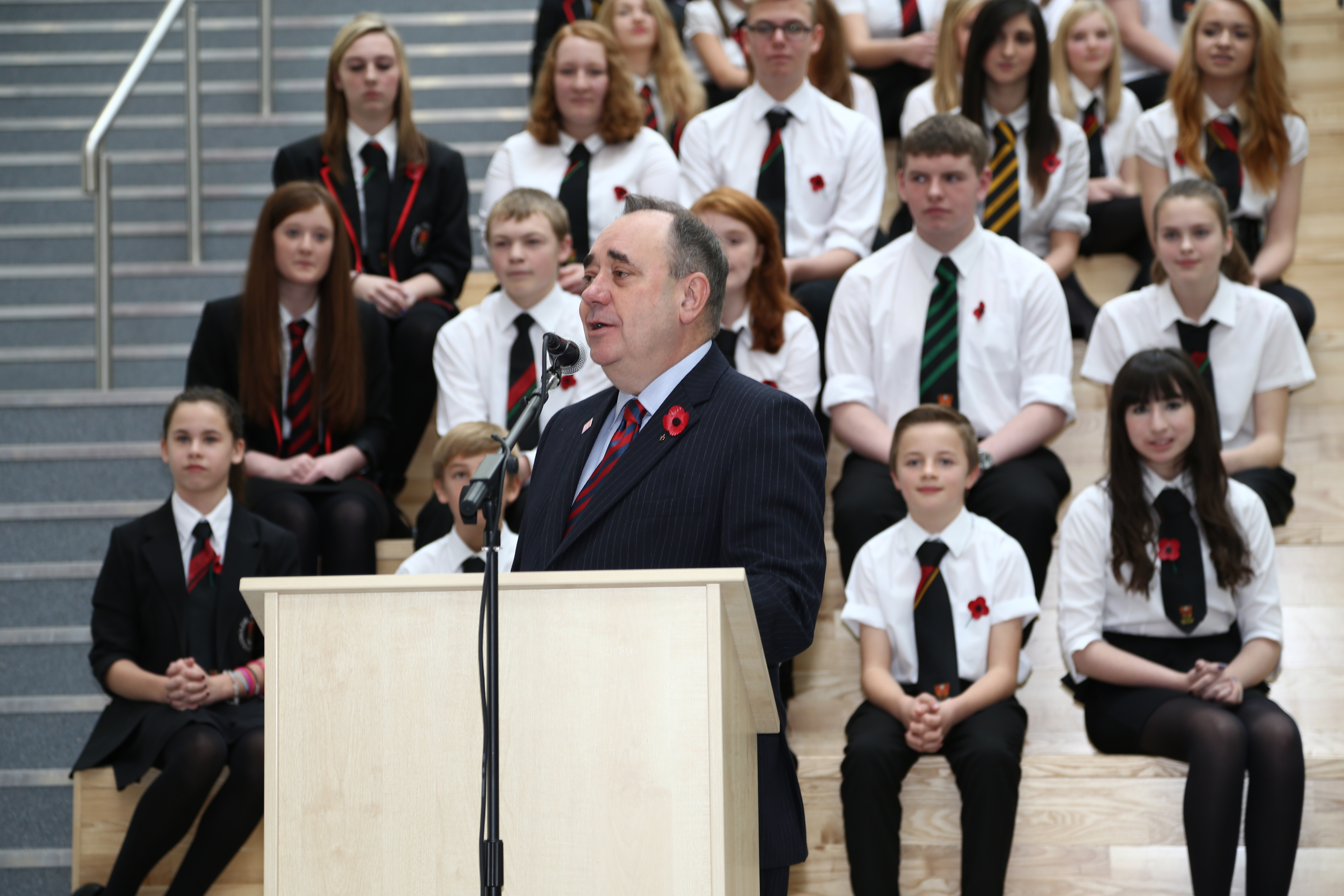
The Scottish First Minister, Alex Salmond, opens the new school campus in 2013.

== Fittest School in Britain 2009 ==
The school took the top prize in the Fitter Schools Challenge, in which 3,000 UK schools put their sporting prowess to the test. The school was presented with a trophy and £10,000 worth of sports equipment by Olympian Roger Black. The challenge was open to first and second year pupils at every school in the UK. Each school had to complete in three challenges which tested their skills and stamina. Pupils were asked to complete a shuttle run, which tested their ability to accelerate and change direction. They were also challenged to see how many star jumps they could do in a minute.

== Links with China and South Africa ==
In recent years, the school has developed educational links with Tianlin No 3 Middle School in Shanghai, People's Republic of China. The collaboration is part of a wider initiative to develop a closer relationship between Scotland and China, and will include teacher and pupil exchanges as well as using e-mail and the internet to develop joint projects.

== Eco-Schools ==
Following a visit by an Eco-Schools inspection team in 2008, Lasswade High was awarded the Green Flag environmental award.

== Notable former pupils ==
=== Lasswade Parish School ===
- James Edward Tierney Aitchison (1835–1898), surgeon and botanist
- Christopher Anderson (1782–1852), theologian.
- Paul Frederick de Quincey (1828–1894), soldier and politician in New Zealand; son of Thomas De Quincey
- Richard Baird Smith (1818–1861), army officer in the East India Company; chief engineer at the Siege of Delhi in 1857.

=== Lasswade Secondary School/Lasswade High School ===
- A. J. Aitken (1921–1998), lexicographer; scholar of the Scots language.
- Margaret-Ann Armour (1939–2019), chemist.
- Sean Fraser (born 1990), swimmer and bronze medallist at the 2008 Summer Paralympics in Beijing.
- Sir James Arnot Hamilton (1923–2012), aircraft designer; Director-General of the Concorde aviation project for the Ministry of Technology (1966–1970).
- Craig Hoy (born 1975), Conservative MSP since 2021.
- Gary Locke (born 1975), professional footballer.
- Canon Stewart Mallin (1924–2000), Episcopalian cleric, Dean of Moray, Ross and Caithness (1983–1991).
- Gary Mason (born 1979), professional footballer.
- Brian McCabe (born 1951), author and poet, editor of the Edinburgh Review (2004–2011).
- Paul F. McMillan (1956–2022), Sir William Ramsay Professor of Chemistry, University College London (2008–2022).
- Gary Naysmith (born 1978), professional footballer.
- Eleanor Pairman (1896–1973), mathematician.
- David Pryde (1890–1959), Labour MP, 1945–1959.
- Graeme Randall (born 1975), former World Judo champion (1999).
- Pat Semple (1939–2021), landscape artist.
- Craig Thomson (born 1991), professional footballer.
- Albert Watson (born 1942), fashion photographer.
- Steven Whittaker (born 1984), professional footballer.
- Peter Wright (born 1967), former rugby union international.
