= Mark Strange =

British Anglican bishop (born 1961)

The Most Reverend Mark Strange
- Bishop of Moray, Ross and Caithness; Primus of the Scottish Episcopal Church
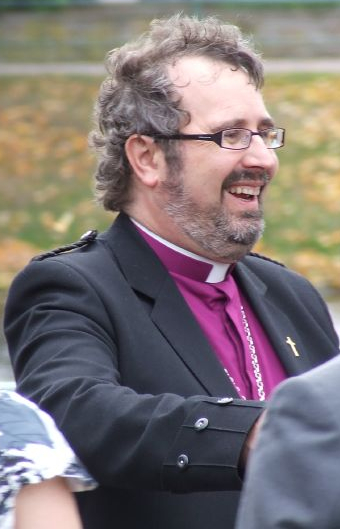
- Church: Scottish Episcopal Church
- Diocese: Moray, Ross and Caithness
- Installed: 13 October 2007
- Predecessor: John Crook

Orders
- Ordination: 1989
- Consecration: 13 October 2007 by Idris Jones

Personal details
- Born: 2 November 1961 (age 64)
- Denomination: Anglican
- Residence: St John's Arpafeelie
- Spouse: Jane
- Children: 3
- Education: University of Aberdeen

Mark Jeremy Strange (born 2 November 1961) is a British Anglican bishop. He is the current Bishop of Moray, Ross and Caithness in the Scottish Episcopal Church. He is the Primus of the Scottish Episcopal Church, having been elected at an Episcopal Synod in Edinburgh on 27 June 2017.

== Early life and education ==
He was educated at the University of Aberdeen; he was awarded a Licentiate of Theology in 1982. After working in one of the Licensed trades from 1982 to 1984, he continued his education at Lincoln Theological College, C.M.M. 1987.

== Ordained ministry ==
He was ordained in the Anglican ministry a deacon in 1989 and priest in 1990. His first pastoral appointment was as a curate at St Barnabas with Christ Church, Worcester (1989–92), then the Vicar of St Wulstan's, Warndon, Worcester (1992–98). He moved to Scotland, where, from 1998 to 2007, he was the Rector of Holy Trinity, Elgin and Priest in charge of the churches of St Margaret's, Lossiemouth, St Michael's, Dufftown and St Margaret's, Aberlour.

=== Episcopal ministry ===
He was elected Bishop of Moray, Ross and Caithness in June 2007, and consecrated and installed in a special service at St Andrew's Cathedral, Inverness on 13 October 2007. On 27 June 2017, he was elected Primus of the Scottish Episcopal Church.

== Honours ==
He was created a Companion of the Roll of Honour of the Memorial of Merit of King Charles the Martyr in 2017. As of 2026, he was both the Acting Registrar and Chaplain of the organisation.

Scottish Episcopal Church titles
| Preceded by John Michael Crook | Bishop of Moray, Ross and Caithness; 2007 to Present | Incumbent |
| Preceded by David Chillingworth | Primus of the Scottish Episcopal Church; 2017 to Present | Incumbent |
