= Colin Davis (disambiguation) =

Colin Davis (1927–2013) was an English conductor.

Other people named Colin Davis include:

- Colin Davis (racing driver) (1933–2012), English racing driver
- Colin Davis (philosopher) (born 1960), professor of French at Royal Holloway, University of London
- J. C. Davis (1940–2021), British historian
