= Margaret-Ann Armour =

Scottish-born Canadian chemist (1939–2019)

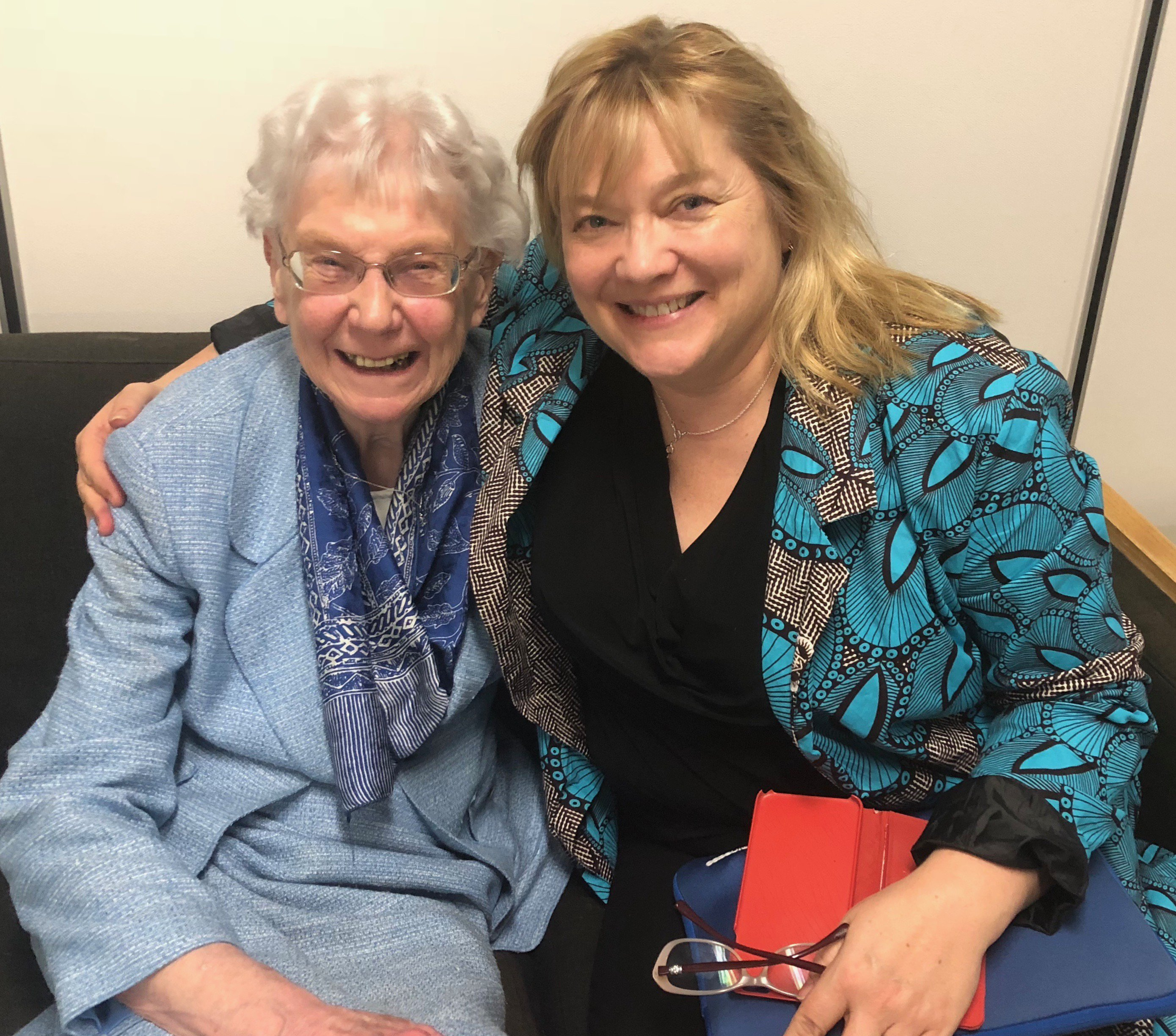
- Armour (left) and Imogen Coe (right) in 2018
- Born: 6 September 1939; Glasgow, Scotland, UK
- Died: 25 May 2019 (aged 79); Edmonton, Alberta, Canada
- Education: University of Edinburgh; University of Alberta
- Known for: Hazardous Waste Disposal; Advocacy for Women In Science
- Awards: Member of Order of Canada (2006); 3M Teaching Fellow (1996); Canada 150 Ambassador (2017)

Margaret-Ann Armour CM (6 September 1939 – 25 May 2019) was a Scottish-born Canadian chemist based at the University of Alberta. She is best known for her expertise in developing guidelines for hazardous lab waste disposal, and for being a vocal advocate for women in science. Armour founded the Women in Scholarship, Engineering, Science and Technology (WISEST) program, and served as the first and only Associate Dean of Science for Diversity at the University of Alberta. Among her many honors, she was named a member of the Order of Canada (2006), a 3M Teaching Fellow (1996) and a Canada 150 ambassador (2017).

== Early life and education ==
Armour was born in Glasgow, Scotland on 6 September 1939, Her father died during World War II, and she was raised by her mother (a teacher). Armour and her mother lived in a town between Dundee and Aberdeen, before moving to Penicuik, where Armour attended the nearby Lasswade Secondary School. Her natural curiosity for science was fostered there by her chemistry teacher Pop Davidson. Armour went on to pursue a Bachelor of Science at the University of Edinburgh, then spent five years working as research chemist in the paper-making industry at Penicuik, where her research into finding different paper coatings resulted in Armour being awarded a Master of Science from the University of Edinburgh.

In 1970, Armour completed her PhD in organic chemistry at the University of Alberta in Canada. She completed a post-doctoral fellowship at the University of Edinburgh, under the supervision of John Cadogan.

== Career ==
In 1979, Armour joined the University of Alberta's Department of Chemistry, where she was one of the few female professors in the university's Faculty of Science. Armour supervised undergraduate organic chemistry laboratory courses. Her research explored how to dispose of dangerous waste, where she published several guidelines including the Hazardous Laboratory Chemicals Disposal Guide.

In 1982, Armour was leading a committee to explore how to increase the number of women in science, which led her to found the Women in Scholarship, Engineering, Science and Technology (WISEST) program. WISEST initiatives seek to promote diversity in the STEM fields through engagement, education and application. WISEST's efforts have been recognized by various awards, including a Michael Smith Award for Science Promotion (1994), the Royal Society of Canada's McNeil Medal, and Alberta Science and Technology Awards Foundation's Excellence in Science and Technology Public Awareness Prize (1996).

Armour served as the assistant chair of the Department of Chemistry (1989–2005) before assuming the role of the University of Alberta's Associate Dean of Science for Diversity in 2005. Armour is the first and only person to serve as the Associate Dean of Science for Diversity in the university. In this position, Armour developed 13 initiatives, including Project Catalyst, which is a program to increase the representation of women in faculty positions within the University of Alberta's Faculty of Science. Since 2005, Armour oversaw the recruitment of 14 women (out of 37 faculty positions in total).

On April 6, 2006, Armour was named a member of the Order of Canada. Among her many awards, she has notably been recognized as a 3M Teaching Fellow (1996), one of the 100 Edmontonians of the Century and a Canada 150 ambassador by the Government of Canada in 2017. Armour has previously been recognized in Maclean's Ten Canadians Making a Difference list (2003), in the Who's Who of Canadian Women 1999–2000 book, and twice in Women's Executive Network's Top 100 Most Powerful Women in Canada. She has received honorary degrees from multiple universities, including the University of British Columbia, the University of Edinburgh, MacEwan University, and Memorial University of Newfoundland and Labrador.

Armour has previously served as a chair for the Canadian Coalition of Women in Science, Engineering, Trades and Technology (CCWESTT). In 2010, Armour established the Canadian Centre for Women in Science, Engineering, Trades and Technology (WinSETT Centre), where she served as president of the board.

In September 2016, a 600-student large public school (K–9) in Ambleside (an Edmonton neighbourhood) was named after Armour (titled the Dr. Margaret-Ann Armour Edmonton Public School). The school has since exceeded capacity. In addition, the University of Alberta's Working for Inclusivity in Chemistry group has launched a student-led speaker series in her name (Margaret-Ann Armour Lecture Series).

Armour died, aged 79, on 25 May 2019. One day before her death, Armour received an honorary degree from the Concordia University of Edmonton.

== Selected awards ==
- University of Alberta's Academic Women's Award (1995)
- 3M Teaching Fellow (1996)
- CITV Woman of Vision (1998)
- University of Alberta Board of Governor's Award of Distinction (1999)
- Governor General's Award in Commemoration of the Persons Case (2002)
- Maclean's Ten Canadians Making a Difference list (2003)
- Women's Executive Network's Top 100 Most Powerful Women in Canada
- American Chemical Society Award for Encouraging Women into Careers in the Chemical Sciences (2004)
- University of Alberta Alumni Association's Distinguished Alumni Award (2004)
- Edmontonian of the Century
- Chemical Institute of Canada's Montreal Medal
- Governor General's Award in Commemoration of the Persons Case
- Order of Canada (2006)
- Canada 150 ambassador by the Government of Canada (2017)

== Selected bibliography ==
- Margaret-Ann Armour. Chemical waste management and disposal. Journal of Chemical Education. 1988.
- Tadashi Hanaya, Akihiko Miyoshi, Ayashi Noguchi, Heizan Kawamoto, Margaret-Ann Armour, Alan M. Hogg, Hiroshi Yamamoto. A Convenient Synthesis of (2R)-1-Amino-1-Deoxy-1-Phosphinylglycerols. Bulletin of the Chemical Society of Japan. 1990.
- Tadashi Hanaya, Ryuji Okamoto, Yurij V. Prikhod'ko, Margaret-Ann Armour, Alan M. Hogg and Hiroshi Yamamoto . Synthesis of 6-deoxy-6-phenylphosphonoyl-D-fructopyranoses: the first phosphorus-in-the-ring analogues of a ketose. Journal of the Chemical Society. 1993.
- Margaret-Ann Armour. Hazardous Laboratory Chemicals Disposal Guide. 2003. Book. Boca Raton, FL: CRC Press. ISBN 9780429140754.
- MH Wong, MA Armour, R Naidu, M Man. Persistent toxic substances: Sources, fates and effects. 2012. Review. Reviews on Environmental Health.
- Margaret-Ann Armour. Building on Success: Increasing the Percentage of Women Faculty in the Sciences. Proceedings of the 12th CCWESTT conference. 2008
- Madill, Helen M.; Campbell, Rachel G.; Cullen, Dallas M.; Armour, Margaret-Ann; Einsiedel, Albert A.; Ciccocioppo, Anna-Lisa; Sherman, Jody; Stewin, Leonard L.; Varnhagen, Stanley; Montgomerie, T. Craig; Rothwell, Cynthia J.; Coffin, Wendy L.. Developing career commitment in STEM-related fields: myth versus reality. Women and Minorities in Science, Technology, Engineering and Mathematics: Upping the Numbers. Edited by Ronald J. Burke, Mary C. Mattis and Edward Elgar. ISBN 978-1-84542-888-4. Published by Edward Elgar Publishing, Inc., Northampton, MA, USA, 2007, p. 210.
