= Leofric Hay-Dinwoody =

20th-century Scottish Anglican priest

Leofric Matthew Hay-Dinwoody was an eminent Anglican priest in the first half of the 20th century.
He was successively Precentor of Inverness Cathedral, Rector of Holy Trinity, Elgin and Dean of Moray, Ross and Caithness from 1925 until 1932.

== Notes ==
Religious titles
Preceded by Hay Wilson	Dean of Moray, Ross and Caithness; 1925–1932	Succeeded by Walter Jenks
