= Hickford =

Hickford is a surname. Notable people with the surname include:

- Frederick Hickford (1862–1929), Australian politician
- John Hickford, British dancemaster. Owned Hickford's Long Room 1713 — c.1779.
- Michael Hickford (born 1953), British Anglican priest
