= James Kelly (bishop) =

English bishop (1832–1907)

The Right Reverend James Kelly
- Bishop of Moray, Ross and Caithness; Primus of the Scottish Episcopal Church
- Church: Scottish Episcopal Church
- Diocese: Diocese of Moray, Ross and Caithness
- Appointed: 1886
- In office: 1886–1904
- Predecessor: Robert Eden
- Successor: Arthur Maclean
- Other post: Primus of the Scottish Episcopal Church (1901–1904)
- Previous posts: Bishop of Newfoundland (1876–1877); Coadjutor Bishop of Moray and Ross (1885–1886)

Orders
- Ordination: 1856
- Consecration: 16 August 1876 by Archibald Campbell Tait
- Rank: Bishop

Personal details
- Born: 18 February 1832 England
- Died: 15 May 1907 (aged 75) Inverness, Scotland
- Buried: Tomnahurich Cemetery, Inverness
- Education: University of Cambridge

James Butler Knill Kelly (18 February 1832 – 15 May 1907) was a bishop of the Church of England active in the British colony of Newfoundland and Scotland. Kelly was a participant in the first Lambeth Conference, which was a crucial step in the creation of the Anglican Communion. He was also Primus of the Scottish Episcopal Church from 1901 to 1904.

== Early life and education ==
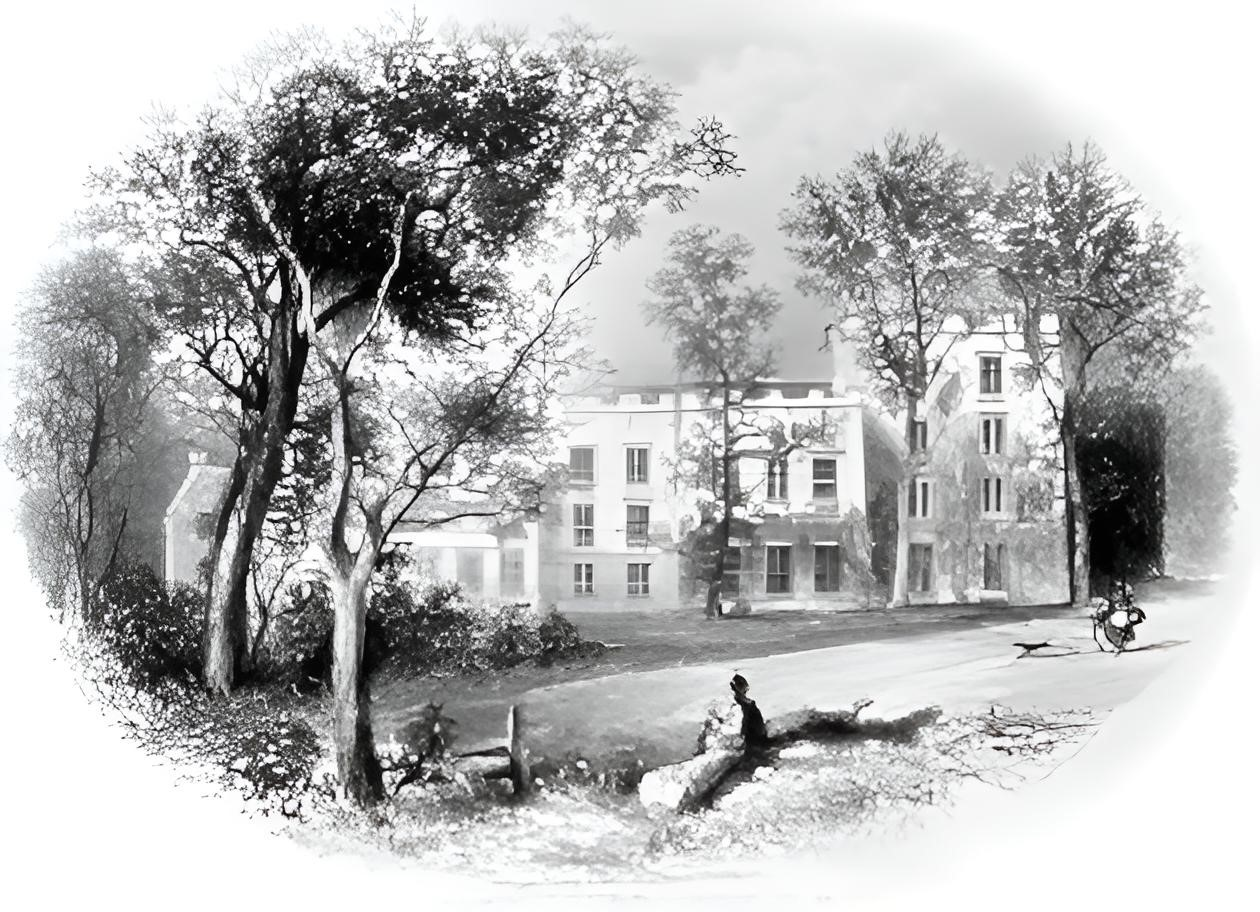
St. Nicholas-Bishop's Court circa 1860, when Kelly took over as vicar.

Kelly received his Bachelor of Arts and Master of Arts from the University of Cambridge, studying at Clare Hall (later renamed Clare College shortly after Kelly's graduation). However, Clare was in a period of academic decline during Kelly's time there.

In 1855, at the age of 23, Kelly was made deacon of the Anglican Church. A year later, in 1856, he was ordained priest. Kelly became curate of Abington, Northamptonshire, but left England for the Isle of Man, to serve as a domestic chaplain for Bishop of Sodor and Man, Horatio Powys. In 1860, upon the death of Joseph Brown, Kelly became registrar and vicar of the Kirkmichael parish on the Isle of Man, while continuing as chaplain to Powys. Kelly was the second vicar, after Brown, in the new (1858) parish church, St. Nicholas-Bishop's Court.

== Life in Newfoundland ==
In 1839 the Anglican Church had founded the See of Newfoundland, its second bishop, Edward Feild, appealed in 1864 for additional clergy to minister in the diocese, thus offering Kelly an opportunity in North America which he quickly seized, leaving the Isle of Man two years before it achieved Home Rule. In June, Kelly found himself appointed incumbent of the cathedral in St. John's, Newfoundland, and archdeacon.

1867 was a momentous year for Kelly. His ministry had proven a success, and Feild named Kelly his assistant bishop. Charles Thomas Longley, the Archbishop of Canterbury, performed the ceremony of consecration on 16 August. Kelly, thirty-five years old, received his Doctor of Divinity degree from Cambridge University, and attended the first Pan-Anglican conference of British, colonial and foreign bishops conference in Lambeth. The conference had been lobbied for by, among others, the Canadian synod, but much of the agenda focused on the controversy over John William Colenso, a missionary to the Zulu. Eleven advisory resolutions regarding colonial district administration were nevertheless passed.

The Anglican Diocese of Newfoundland also included the island of Bermuda. Kelly and Feild travelled aboard the diocesan ship The Star, and both nearly died in 1871 in a sailing accident that destroyed the ship. This was not the last occasion in which sea travel proved a hardship to Kelly; he became seriously ill in 1874 when travelling to coastal communities in Newfoundland and Labrador. Kelly's logs of his travels on The Star have been published as Journal of a visitation by the Right Reverend J. B. K. Kelly, DD, coadjutor bishop of Newfoundland, in the church ship Star, July–October, 1869, (London, 1870), and The voyage the churchship Star, 1870 (St.John's, 1973).

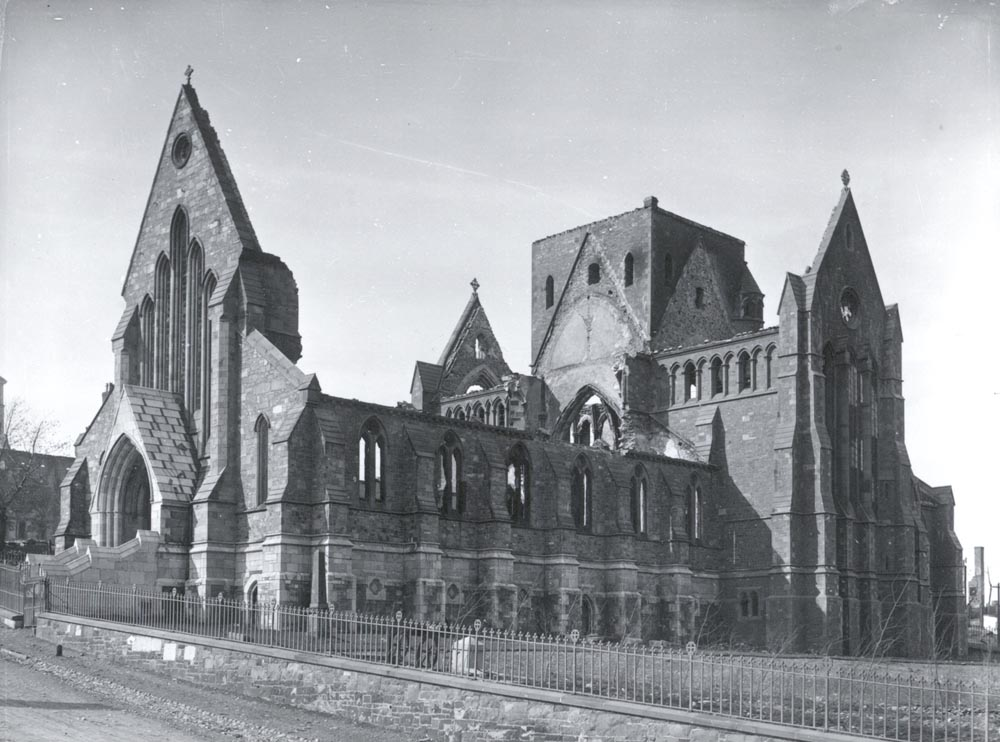
Cathedral of St. John the Baptist after the Great Fire of 1892

Kelly's trips did not distract him from projects at home. On 9 October 1871, he married Louisa Bliss, daughter of William Blowers Bliss, a prominent judge from Nova Scotia. Kelly took on leadership of the completion of the Cathedral of St. John the Baptist (not to be confused with the Basilica of St. John the Baptist). The cathedral's nave, finished in 1850, had been serving as the entire church. The cathedral was finished in 1885, but burned down in the Great Fire of 1892. Kelly organized its reconstruction. The Cathedral bears a memorial window dedicated to his memory.

Kelly became diocesan bishop in 1876, after Feild's death. His understandable aversion to sea travel, however, led him to resign the position in 1877 after a fruitless search for a coadjutor who could relieve him of its necessity.

== Return to the United Kingdom ==
In 1877 Kelly returned to his country of birth, where he became vicar of Kirkby, Lancashire, from 1877 to 1880, bishop-commissary for the Bishop of Chester (1879-1884) and Archdeacon of Macclesfield from 1880 to 1884. He later became Provost of Inverness Cathedral and Assistant Bishop of Moray, Ross and Caithness in 1885, becoming diocesan bishop in 1886 after Robert Eden. In 1901, he was unanimously elected Primus of the Scottish Episcopal Church and served in that capacity for three years until his retirement.

He died in Inverness in 1907.

== Notes and references ==
1. "Clare College: About Clare (History)". Archived from the original on 10 February 2011.
2. "1867 Lambeth Conference Resolutions".

Religious titles
Preceded by Edward Feild	Bishop of Newfoundland; 1876–1877	Succeeded by Llewellyn Jones
Preceded by Robert Eden	Provost of St Andrew's Cathedral, Inverness; 1885–1891	Succeeded by Herbert Mather
Preceded by Robert Eden	Bishop of Moray, Ross and Caithness; 1886–1904	Succeeded by Arthur John Maclean
Preceded by Hugh Willoughby Jermyn	Primus of the Scottish Episcopal Church; 1901–1904	Succeeded by George Howard Wilkinson
