= Michael Hickford =

Michael Francis Hickford was an Anglican priest in the late 20th and early 21st centuries.

He was born on 7 October 1953, educated at Gravesend Grammar School and ordained after a period of study at Edinburgh Theological College in 1986. He was Chaplain of St John's Cathedral, Oban from 1986 to 1989 and then Rector, St Mungo, Alexandria, West Dunbartonshire until 1995. He was priest in charge of St James the Great, Dingwall with St Anne, Strathpeffer; and from 1998 Dean of Moray, Ross and Caithness. From 2003 to 2004 he was Provost of St Andrew's Cathedral, Inverness and Hospital and Community Health Care Chaplain for NHS Highland since then.

== Notes ==
Religious titles
Preceded by Robin Forrest	Dean of Moray, Ross and Caithness; 1998 to 2003	Succeeded by Len Black
Preceded by Malcolm Grant	Provost of St Andrew's Cathedral, Inverness; 2003 to 2004	Succeeded by Alexander Ronald Gordon
