= John Crook (bishop) =

British bishop (born 1940)

The Right Reverend John Crook
- Bishop Emeritus of Moray, Ross and Caithness
- Church: Scottish Episcopal Church
- Diocese: Moray, Ross and Caithness
- Elected: 1999
- In office: 1999–2007
- Predecessor: Gregor MacGregor
- Successor: Mark Strange

Orders
- Ordination: 1965
- Consecration: 25 September 1999

Personal details
- Born: 11 June 1940 (age 85) England

John Michael Crook (born 11 June 1940) was Bishop of Moray, Ross and Caithness from 1999 to 2006.

== Biography ==
Crook was born on 11 June 1940 and educated at Dame Allan's School, Newcastle, William Hulme's Grammar School, Manchester, St David’s College, Lampeter and the College of the Resurrection, Mirfield. He was ordained in 1965. After curacies in Horninglow and Bloxwich he held incumbencies in Inverness (St Michael & All Angels), Callander, and Bridge of Allan. He was a canon residentiary at St Ninian's Cathedral, Perth until his elevation to the episcopate.

== Notes ==
Religious titles
Preceded by Gregor MacGregor	Bishop of Moray, Ross and Caithness; 1999–2007	Succeeded by Mark Strange
