= Edward Feild =

British bishop and educator (1801–1876)

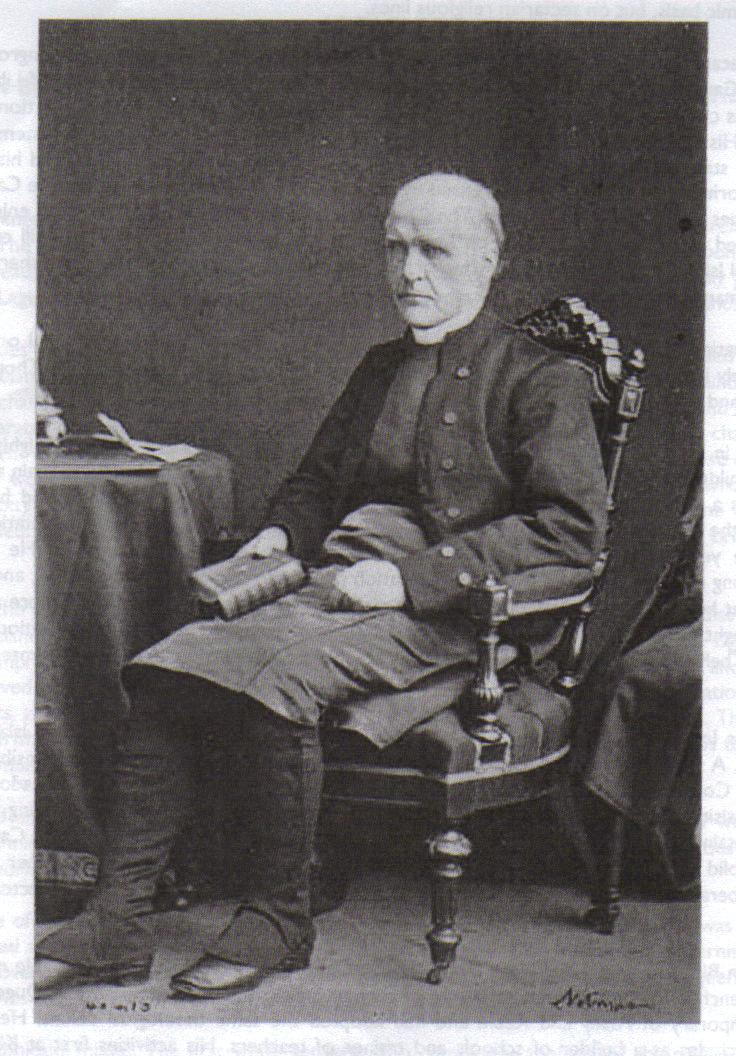
Bishop Feild

Edward Feild (7 June 1801 – 8 June 1876) was a university tutor, university examiner, Anglican clergyman, inspector of schools, and second Bishop of Newfoundland.

== Early years ==
Born in Worcester, England, Feild was educated at Rugby School and Queen's College, Oxford. As an exhibitioner at Queen's College (although he matriculated at Wadham College, Oxford he moved immediately to Queen's), he graduated in 1823 with first class honours in mathematics and second in classics, in 1825 becoming a Fellow. From 1823 to 1825 Feild studied divinity and attended lectures given by the Regius Professor of Divinity, Charles Lloyd, which undoubtedly influenced the formation of his High Church convictions. Feild tried unsuccessfully to become a Fellow of Oriel College, a more intellectually lively college than Queen's. The successful candidates were future Tractarians Hurrell Froude and Robert Isaac Wilberforce. So fierce was the competition, in fact, that one of Oriel's Fellows commemorated the event in Greek verse.

Feild was ordained a deacon in 1826, and a priest in 1827 by the Bishop of Oxford and combined work as a tutor at Queen's and university examiner with being curate in charge at Kidlington. There he stayed until 1835 when he accepted the living of English Bicknor. In both parishes Feild instituted considerable reform—rebuilding, starting schools, encouraging his parishioners to cultivate allotments on church land, and raising money from his friends. However, what brought him to prominence – and led to his being offered a bishopric – was his work as Inspector of Schools for the National Society and his subsequent published report which was widely discussed throughout the country.

Feild served as Bishop of Newfoundland from 1844 to 1876, also holding the posts of Archdeacon of Newfoundland and Archdeacon of Bermuda. He was considered for the See of Lincoln in 1851 and turned down the See of Montreal in 1868.

On arrival in Newfoundland, having already decided what he intended to do, he proceeded to build up a strong independent church with a distinctly high church tone. His first problem was to make the church self-financing and he tackled it by setting up a Church Society to receive money collected by missionaries from their parishioners. This proved hugely unpopular as the fishermen were used to a church which was financed by missionary societies which obtained their funds in England. Nor were missionaries easy to find, the SPG could produce few as Newfoundland lacked the glamour of Africa or New Zealand. Feild took recourse to his network of friends in England who recruited several able and highly educated volunteers, as well as some uneducated men of working class origin who became missionaries in return for education and the ordination impossible for them in England. They were educated at his theological college, fashioned out of an ineffective previous Theological Institute and called Queen's College, and grounded in Tractarian theology in a hardworking semi-monastic institution. He made it very clear that any missionaries who denied the doctrine of baptismal regeneration would be promptly suspended. This was attacked in England by the Evangelical paper "The Record" as "an ultra-Tractarian of the Exeter school".

Feild also built a cathedral, work beginning in 1846 guided by Sir George Gilbert Scott, a leading church architect in England who wrote detailed instructions to a Clerk of Works and team of masons in Newfoundland. By 1850 the nave had been built and services commenced. When completed it was thought to be one of the finest churches in North America. With the aid of the Revd William Grey, the diocesan architect, Feild had by 1855 built 27 new churches on the Gothic Revival pattern.

As his diocese also included the Bermudas, Feild bought a church ship and travelled a great deal, describing his journeys in a journal published in The Church in the Colonies. This, together with numerous publications, kept his doings in the public eye in England. He set up a boys' school, the precursor of Bishop Feild College of which so many influential Newfoundlanders were alumni, and a girls' school, as he was a firm believer in the education of women. He campaigned for thirty years for the grant given for education by the local legislature to Protestants to be divided so that Anglicans could be treated in the same way as the Roman Catholic Church. Nowhere else in the British colonies was a bishop to obtain such a denominational system of education. Although Feild disapproved of clergymen being politicians, he spoke out in defence of the Newfoundland fisheries, and in 1861 denounced the Newfoundland government. In 1867 he reorganised his diocese, acquired an assistant bishop, James Butler Knill Kelly (afterwards Primus of Scotland), and married Sophia, the widow of the Revd J.G. Mountain (one of his missionaries).

Never a man to compromise, despising popularity, who made no bones about his differences with Methodists and Roman Catholics, and trying hard to rid his church of evangelicals, he was at first unpopular. His engaging personality, absence of malice, and strong sense of principle eventually won Feild affectionate respect. Newfoundland was often compared to Ireland. Sectarian feeling ran high and could have led to extensive bloodshed had the Protestant ascendancy of the early nineteenth century been maintained. However it was shattered by Feild, as the Methodists disliked him as much as they did the Roman Catholics, so that in a community split three ways no one could be dominant. Not only did he unwittingly divide the population, but his insistence that educational grants be divided three ways provided an important precedent for a general division of all state patronage. This kept the peace.

== Later years ==
Feild was reputed to be never ill, although poor diet and the hardships of life in Newfoundland led to many deaths among his missionaries. Nonetheless in 1875 overwork and an exceptionally cold winter led to a severe illness and a journey to Bermuda to recuperate. There he died and was buried in Hamilton cemetery.

Feild's legacy includes his cathedral, Bishop Feild College in Newfoundland which bears his name, and Feild Hall, the postgraduate student residence of Memorial University of Newfoundland. In England, the local state school in Kidlington is called Edward Feild Primary School.

== In popular culture ==
Feild's affinity for children's exercise led to the creation of "Feild" days at schools in the English countryside. This is normally misspelled "Field Day" in American translations.

== See also ==
- List of people of Newfoundland and Labrador
- List of communities in Newfoundland and Labrador

Church of England titles
Preceded by Aubrey Spencer	Bishop of Newfoundland; 1844–1876	Succeeded by James Kelly
