= Charles Lloyd (priest) =

Charles Whitworth Robert Lloyd was an Anglican priest.
Born on 28 June 1879, educated at Christ Church, Oxford and ordained in 1913, his first post was as Curate at St Thomas, Eccleston.. After this he was Priest in charge of St Martin Dundee and then of St Paul, Kinlochleven. He was Dean of Argyll and The Isles from 1933 to 1940.

== Notes ==
Religious titles
Preceded by Alexander Stewart MacInnes	Dean of Argyll and The Isles; 1933 – 1940	Succeeded by James Courtney Bevin
