= David O. Carpenter =

American scientist (born 1937)

David O. Carpenter (born January 27, 1937) is a professor of environmental health sciences at the University at Albany, SUNY, where he is the director of the Institute for Health and the Environment. He is the co-editor-in-chief (along with Peter Sly) of the academic journal Reviews on Environmental Health; and co-editor-in-chief of the journal Environmental Pollution.

== Education ==
Carpenter received his MD from Harvard University in 1964.

== Scientific work ==
Carpenter has authored more than 370 peer-reviewed publications and six books. His research has included studies on adverse effects of hydraulic fracturing, farmed salmon, and electromagnetic fields, and he has said that "up to 15 percent" of cases of childhood cancer might be caused by exposure to magnetic fields from power lines.
