= James Bevin =

Scottish Anglican priest

James Courtney Bevin was an Anglican priest in the 20th century.

He was born in Dulverton, Somerset, in 1872 and died on 23 December 1946 and is commemorated on a stone in St Bride's Episcopal Church, North Ballachulish, Inverness-shire.

He was ordained in 1907 and was Dean of Argyll and The Isles from 1940 until his death in 1946. He was the great great uncle of the British Labour politician Ernest Bevin.

== Notes ==
Religious titles
Preceded by Charles Whitworth Robert Lloyd	Dean of Argyll and The Isles; 1940 – 1946	Succeeded by Duncan MacInnes
