= Colin Davis (philosopher) =

English philosopher (born 1960)

Colin Davis (born 1960) is professor of French at Royal Holloway, University of London. He is known for his research on French literature and Levinas's thought.

== Books ==
- Levinas: An Introduction, Cambridge: Polity Press, 1996
- After Poststructuralism: Reading, Stories and Theory, 2004
- Ethical Issues in Twentieth-Century French Fiction (2000)
- French Fiction in the Mitterrand Years (with Elizabeth Fallaize, 2000).
