= St Michael & All Angels, Inverness =

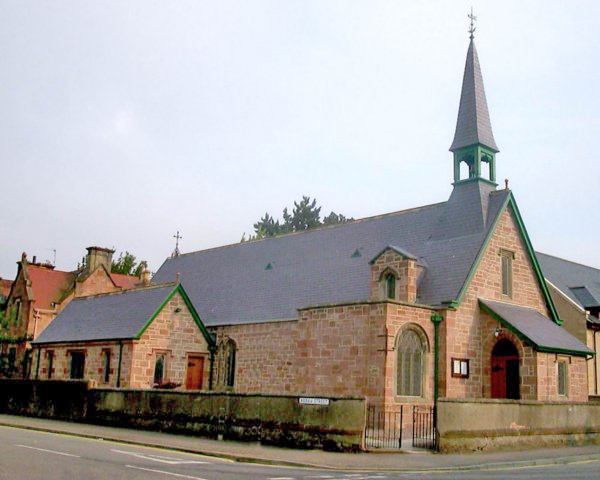
- St Michael & All Angels Church

- Location within Highland
- 57°28′55″N 4°14′16″W
- Denomination: Scottish Episcopal Church
- Churchmanship: High Church
- Website: www.stmichaelschurchinverness.org/

History
- Dedication: St Michael and All Angels

Administration
- Diocese: Moray, Ross & Caithness

Clergy
- Rector: Revd Canon Dr Iain Macritchie

St Michael & All Angels is a church of the Scottish Episcopal Church in the city of Inverness in Scotland on the west bank of the River Ness. It is in the Diocese of Moray, Ross and Caithness.

== History ==
The parish church, built on Abban Street in 1903, was a rebuilding of the mission chapel of the Holy Spirit (Alexander Ross, 1886) which had stood in Factory Street, on the opposite side (east) of the River Ness. In the rebuilding, the church was lengthened.

The architects were Ross and Macbeth, who were based in the city. However, extensive alterations were made to the church under the direction of Ninian Comper in 1904, 1905, 1923, 1924 and 1928, and the church has been called the "Comper Jewel in the Highlands of Scotland".

The church is a simple late-Gothic, three-bay aisleless nave, narthex and chancel, with vestry at north-east, Lady Chapel at north-west, and porch at west gable. It is built of snecked masonry, with a slate roof. There is a spired bellcote at the west end. Inside, there is a collar-braced waggon roof. The Lady Chapel and furnishings were by Comper whose father Reverend John Comper had served as an Episcopal priest in Inverness. The riddel posts with tester above the high altar; stone font with spired and crocketted timber cover; and stained-glass windows are all by Comper.

The church is a Category B listed building for its interior. The adjoining rectory in Abban Street is separately listed Category B; it was built in 1911 to designs by Alexander Ross and Son.

The church stands in the Anglo-Catholic tradition and is a member of Forward in Faith.

The Revd Canon Dr Iain Macritchie is currently the Rector of St Michael & All Angels, as of October 2021.

== See also ==
- Inverness Cathedral
- Len Black, former rector
- John Crook, former rector, Bishop of Moray, Ross and Caithness from 1999 to 2006
- Alexander MacEwen (1875 – 1941), provost of Inverness and first leader of the Scottish National Party (SNP), was a server and member of the vestry
