= Alexander MacInnes =

Alexander Stewart MacInnes (31 November 1850 – 20 June 1933) was a Gaelic-speaking Scottish Episcopalian priest in the "Non-juring Jacobite" tradition.

He was a native of Ballachulish, Scottish Highlands, and was educated at the University of Glasgow and Cumbrae Theological College. He was ordained deacon in 1888 and became a priest in 1891.

He was Rector of St Mary, Glencoe from 1889 to 1933 and Dean of Argyll and The Isles from 1930 to 1933.

Religious titles
Preceded by Charles Pressley Smith	Dean of Argyll and The Isles; 1930 – 1933	Succeeded by Charles Whitworth Robert Lloyd
