= Environmental Pollution (journal) =

- Discipline: Environmental science
- Language: English
- Edited by: David O. Carpenter, Eddy Y. Zeng

Publication details
- History: 1980–present
- Publisher: Elsevier
- Frequency: 15/year
- Impact factor: 8.071 (2020)

Standard abbreviations
- ISO 4: Environ. Pollut.

Indexing
- CODEN: ENPOEK
- ISSN: 0269-7491 (print); 1873-6424 (web)
- OCLC no.: 15211864

Links
- Journal homepage; Online access

Environmental Pollution is a peer-reviewed academic journal covering the biological, health, and ecological effects of environmental pollution. It was established in 1980 as two parts: Environmental Pollution Series A: Ecological and Biological and Environmental Pollution Series B: Chemical and Physical. These parts were merged in 1987 to form the journal under its current title. It is published by Elsevier and the editors-in-chief are David O. Carpenter (University at Albany, SUNY) and Eddy Y. Zeng (Jinan University). According to the Journal Citation Reports, the journal has a 2020 impact factor of 8.071.
