= Pat Semple =

Scottish landscape artist (1939–2021)

- Born: 3 July 1939; Bromley, Kent
- Died: 2 May 2021 (aged 81); Inverness, Scotland
- Education: Edinburgh College of Art
- Known for: Landscape artist

Patricia Frances Semple (3 July 1939 – 2 May 2021) was a Scottish landscape artist and teacher, known for a ' dramatic and visionary style'

== Early life ==
Pat Semple was born in Bromley, Kent, but her parents soon moved back to Scotland, where she spent the rest of her life. Her father was in the merchant navy, away at sea much of the time, and her mother spent periods in a nursing home, succumbing to tuberculosis when Semple was 11 years old. Semple spent most of her childhood with her paternal grandmother, Marion Semple, in a small seaside cottage on Saddell Bay, Kintyre.

She first attended the village school at Saddell, followed by St Margaret's Convent, Edinburgh and Lasswade Secondary School. In 1958, she studied painting and drawing at the Edinburgh College of Art, alongside artists John Bellany and Barbara Rae. Her teachers included John Maxwell, Anne Redpath, Robin Phillipson, Denis Peploe and Derek Clarke.

== Career ==
Semple started her teaching career in 1964 with a job at her old school. By 1980 she was exhibiting paintings and drawings in galleries in Aberdeenshire and Tain. She was elected a member of the Scottish Society of Artists and of the Royal Scottish Society of Painters in Watercolours. She focused on landscapes and seascapes of the Scottish Highlands. She worked in watercolour and oils, and was represented by Brown's Gallery in Tain and the Lost Gallery in Strathdon. Her work is included in the collections of the Scottish Arts Council, as well as in private collections around the world.

== Personal life ==
In 1973 Semple married sculptor Frank Pottinger, whom she had met in college. They moved to Torphins, and later to Strathdon, divorcing in 1989. She moved to Tain in the 1990s, where she met again Derek Clarke, her former teacher, now a widower with three children. They married in 1992, and although they later lived separately, are said to have remained friends, and when he died in 2014, Semple collected his MBE for services to art, granted by the Queen at Holyrood.
