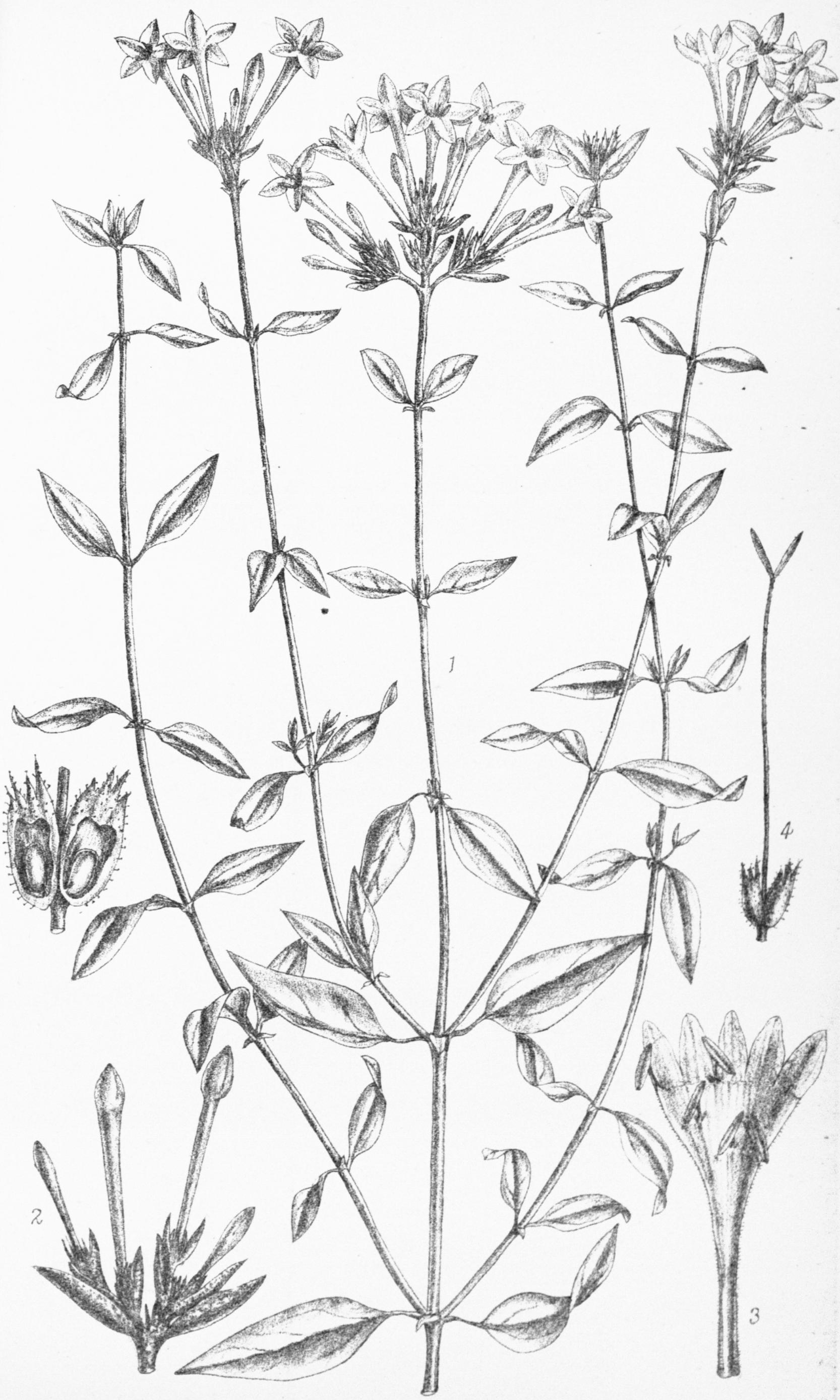

Scientific classification
- Kingdom: Plantae
- Clade: Tracheophytes
- Clade: Angiosperms
- Clade: Eudicots
- Clade: Asterids
- Order: Gentianales
- Family: Rubiaceae
- Genus: Aitchisonia; Hemsl. ex Aitch. (1882)
- Species: A. rosea

Binomial name
- Aitchisonia rosea Hemsl. ex Aitch. (1882)

Synonyms
- Plocama rosea (Hemsl. ex Aitch.) M.Backlund & Thulin

= Aitchisonia =

Species of plant

Aitchisonia rosea is a species of flowering plant in the family Rubiaceae. It is a subshrub native to south-central Iran, Afghanistan, and Pakistan. It is the sole species in genus Aitchisonia.

The species and genus were named in 1882. Based on a phylogenetic analysis, Backlund and Thulin synonymized Aitchisonia with genus Plocama, and renamed the species Plocama rosea. In 2022 Borbar et al. concluded that the specimen used in Backlund and Thulin's analysis was of Plocama dubia, and conducted a phylogenetic analysis of specimens newly collected in Iran. They confirmed the placement of Aitchisonia rosea in its own genus, and proposed a new monophyletic tribe, Aitchisonieae, to contain the genus.
