= James Edward Tierney Aitchison =

Surgeon, botanist (1835–1898)

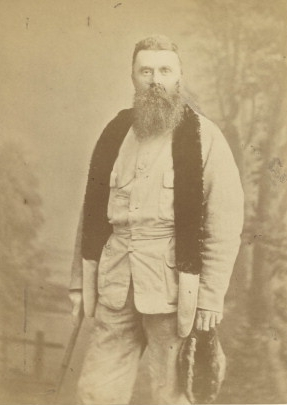
- Photograph from the Kew archives
- Born: 28 October 1835; Neemuch, India
- Died: 30 September 1898 (aged 62); Kew Green, London
- Occupations: surgeon and botanist

James Edward Tierney Aitchison MD LLD CIE FRSE FRS FRCSE (28 October 1835 – 30 September 1898) was a Scottish surgeon and botanist. He worked as British Commissioner to Ladakh, India, in 1872 and collected numerous specimens from the region and published catalogues of plants including those of economic interest. The plant genus Aitchisonia was named after him by Helmsley but the name is no longer in use. In authorship he is normally known as J. E. T. Aitchison.

== Life ==
Aitchison was born in Neemuch in central India the second son of Major James Aitchison of the East India Company of Scotland. His mother Mary Turner was the sister of John William Turner and through her he took an interest in plants at an early age. The family returned to Scotland where he was educated at Lasswade Parish School, Dalkeith Grammar School and the Edinburgh Academy. From 1853 his mother was living as a widow at 67 Great King Street, a huge Georgian townhouse in Edinburgh's Second New Town.

James obtained his doctorate in medicine at the University of Edinburgh in 1858, presenting his thesis 'Emphysema, one of the complications of parturition' and then entered the Bengal Medical Service. He worked as a civil surgeon at Amritsar, where he also helped establish a school. He suffered from a liver ailment and returned to England during which time he worked on a catalogue of the plants of Punjab and Sindh in 1869. In 1872 he was appointed Commissioner to Ladakh. He collected nearly 10000 specimens of 950 species of plant during his service in the 29th Punjab Regiment under Lord Roberts in the Kuram valley. In 1884 he was naturalist with the Afghan Boundary Commission, and on this expedition too he collected nearly 10000 specimens of 800 species. He was elected Fellow of the Royal Society of Edinburgh in 1881 and a Fellow of the Royal Society of London in 1883, and a Fellow of the Linnean Society in 1863. In 1883 he was created a Commander of the Order of the Indian Empire (CIE).

His herbaria are preserved in the Royal Botanic Gardens, Kew, and Calcutta.

He married Eleanor Carmichael, second daughter of Robert Craig, Esq., of Craigesk, in 1862. He stood as the Liberal Unionist candidate for Clackmannanshire and Kinross-shire in the 1892 General Election.

He died at Priory Terrace, Kew Green near London on 30 September 1898.

== Works ==
- A catalogue of the plants of the Punjab and Sindh (1869)
- The zoology of the Afghan Delimitation Commission (1888)
