= Reviews on Environmental Health =

- Discipline: Environmental health
- Language: English
- Edited by: David O. Carpenter, Peter Sly

Publication details
- History: 1972-present
- Publisher: Walter de Gruyter
- Frequency: Quarterly

Standard abbreviations
- ISO 4: Rev. Environ. Health

Indexing
- CODEN: REVHA3
- ISSN: 0048-7554 (print); 2191-0308 (web)
- LCCN: 73955644
- OCLC no.: 1790775

Links
- Journal homepage

Reviews on Environmental Health is a quarterly peer-reviewed review journal covering the field of environmental health. It was established in 1972 and was published by Freund Publishing House until 2011, when it moved to Walter de Gruyter. The editors-in-chief are David O. Carpenter and Peter Sly.

== Abstracting and indexing ==
The journal is abstracted and indexed in:

- AGRICOLA
- Chemical Abstracts Service
- CINAHL
- EBSCO databases
- Scopus
- Index Medicus/MEDLINE/PubMed
- BIOSIS Previews
