= Elizabeth Fallaize =

Elizabeth Fallaize (3 June 1950 – 6 December 2009) was a British academic who was Pro-Vice Chancellor of the University of Oxford and a French studies scholar.

Fallaize was educated at Dame Allan's School, Newcastle upon Tyne. After graduating with First Class honours in French from the University of Exeter in 1972, she was appointed in 1975 as a lecturer at the School of Languages at Wolverhampton Polytechnic, before moving to Birmingham University's French department in 1977. In 1989 she was appointed an Official Fellow of St John's College, Oxford, the first woman ever to hold this post.

She was a noted expert on the life and works of Simone de Beauvoir.

Fallaize died of motor neurone disease in 2009.

In 2025, a new public park area in the Oxford North innovation district was named Fallaize Park, in her honour. This park features the first permanent art installation by Icelandic artist, Olafur Eliasson, and was the location of a series of hands-on science and arts events during the 2025 Oxford Science and Ideas Festival.
