= Philip Nicholson (cricketer) =

English cricketer (born 1973)

Personal information
- Full name: Philip James Nicholson
- Born: 1 September 1973 (age 53); Newcastle upon Tyne, Northumberland, England
- Batting: Right-handed
- Role: Wicket-keeper

Domestic team information
- Years: Team
- 1990–2012: Northumberland
- 1997–1998: Minor Counties

Career statistics
Competition	List A
Matches	18
Runs scored	92
Batting average	6.57
100s/50s	0/0
Top score	1808
Catches/stumpings	10/4
- Source: Cricinfo, 30 June 2011

Philip James Nicholson (born 1 September 1973) is an English cricketer. Nicholson is a right-handed batsman and wicket-keeper. He was born in Newcastle upon Tyne, Northumberland. He was educated at Dame Allan's School and at Lancaster University.

Nicholson made his debut for Northumberland in the 1990 Minor Counties Championship against Cumberland. He played Minor counties cricket for Northumberland from 1990 to 2012, which has included 107 Minor Counties Championship matches and 60 MCCA Knockout Trophy matches.

He made his List A debut for the Minor Counties cricket team in the 1997 Benson & Hedges Cup against Derbyshire. He played 9 further List A matches for the team, the last of which came against Leicestershire in the 1998 Benson & Hedges Cup. In his 10 matches for the team, he scored 50 runs at an average of 5.55, with a high score of 15. Behind the stumps, he took 8 catches. He had to wait until the 1999 NatWest Trophy to make his first List A appearance for Northumberland, which came against Ireland. He made 7 further List A appearances for the county, the last of which came against Middlesex in the 2005 Cheltenham & Gloucester Trophy. In his 8 List A appearances for the county, he scored 42 runs at an average of 8.40, with a high score of 18 not out. Behind the stumps, he took 2 catches and made 4 stumpings.

Nicholson has also played for the Benwell Hill Cricket Club in the North East Premier League since 2000, having played a total of 339 matches as of September 2019.
