= All Saints' Church, St Andrews =

Church building in St Andrews, United Kingdom

Coordinates: 56.3410°N 2.7907°W

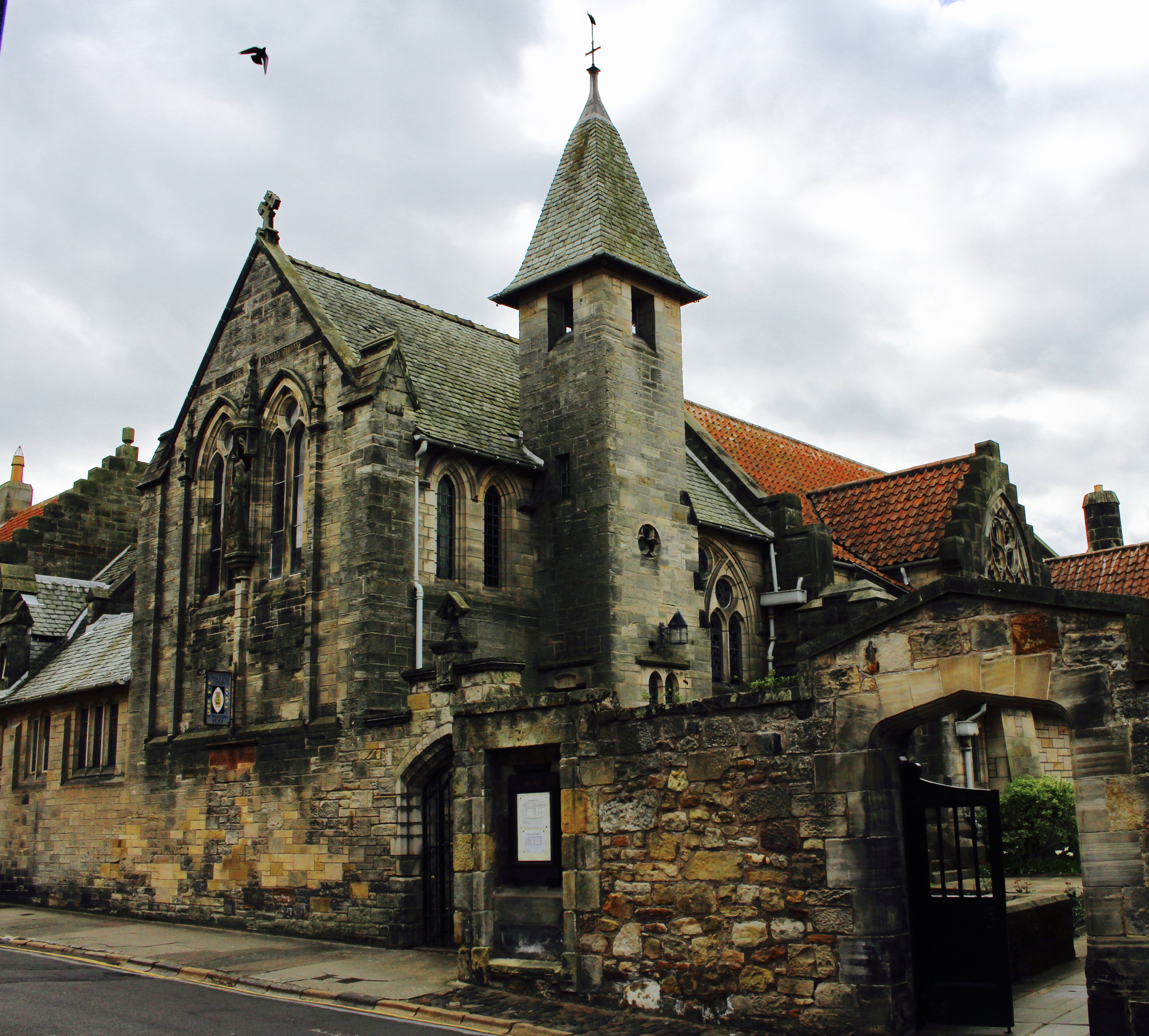
St Andrews, North Castle Street, All Saints Episcopal Church

All Saints' Church, St Andrews, is in North Castle Street, St Andrews, Fife, Scotland (grid reference NO512168). It is an active Scottish Episcopal Church and is a Category A listed building.

The first church building on the site was a temporary iron church made by Spiers of Glasgow in May 1903, which provided seating for 150 people. The foundation stone for a more permanent building was laid on 11 March 1907. In that year a chancel and belltower designed by the Chester architect John Douglas were built. The iron structure was moved to form the nave of the church. In June 1920 the foundation stone of a new nave was laid. This was designed by Paul Waterhouse and consecrated on 1 November 1923.

The current rector is Alasdair Coles.

== See also ==
- List of church restorations, amendments and furniture by John Douglas
