= Arpafeelie =

Coordinates: 57.523°N 04.321°W

Arpafeelie: Scottish Gaelic: Arpa Phìlidh
- Location within the Ross and Cromarty area
- OS grid reference: NH6150
- Council area: Highland
- Country: Scotland
- Sovereign state: United Kingdom
- Police: Scotland
- Fire: Scottish
- Ambulance: Scottish
- UK Parliament: Ross, Skye and Lochaber
- Scottish Parliament: Skye, Lochaber and Badenoch

Arpafeelie (Scottish Gaelic: Arpa Phìlidh) is a hamlet on the Black Isle, in Ross and Cromarty, in the Highland council area of Scotland. It is situated 4 km north-west of the village of North Kessock, and 8 km north-west of the city of Inverness. The A9 road, the main road north from Inverness, passes by to the east of Arpafeelie.

It is the location of St John's Church, part of the Scottish Episcopal Church. Completed in 1816, St John's is the oldest church in the diocese of Moray, Ross and Caithness.
