= Tomnahurich Cemetery =

Victorian cemetery in Inverness, Scotland

Tomnahurich Cemetery Hill
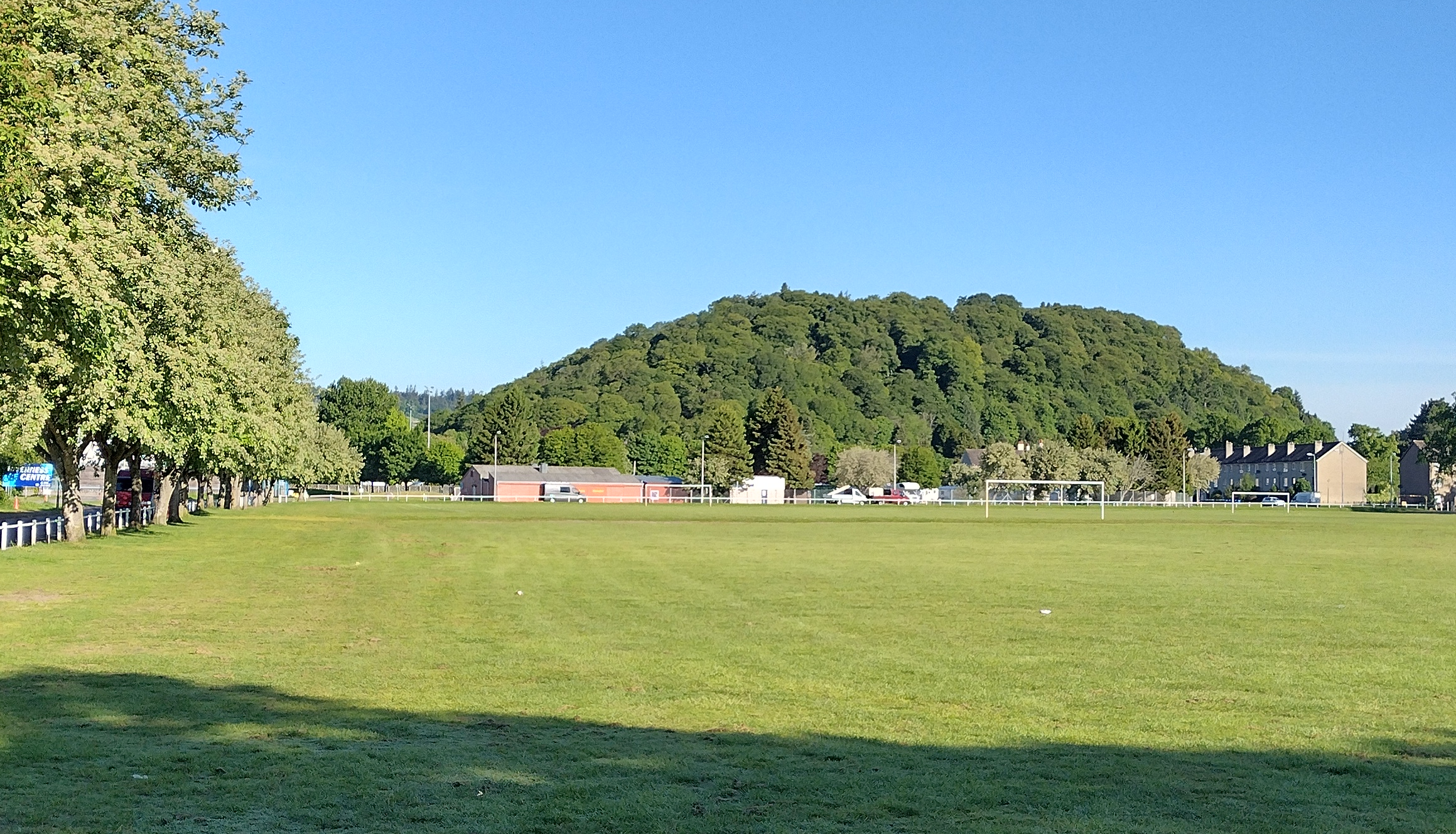
- SW view of the hill
- Interactive map of Tomnahurich Cemetery Hill

Details
- Established: 1864
- Location: Inverness
- Country: Scotland
- Coordinates: 57.46687°N 4.242654°W
- Type: Public

Inventory of Gardens and Designed Landscapes in Scotland
- Official name: Tomnahurich Cemetery
- Designated: 30 March 2003
- Reference no.: GDL00374

The Tomnahurich Cemetery is a Victorian cemetery lying on and around a wooded hill in Inverness, Scotland.

== Etymology ==
Tomnahurich is a Scottish Gaelic place-name which means "hill of the yew wood", tom na h-iubhraich, as was pointed out by Professor W. J. Watson in his magisterial and ground-breaking work of 1926, The Celtic Place-Names of Scotland. Watson himself is actually buried in the cemetery here, under a fine monument. The name does not mean 'hill of the fairies', as has been suggested. There is, however, a local Gaelic story Aonghas Mòr Thom na h-Iubhraich agus na Sìthichean ("Big Angus of Tomnahurich and the Fairies"), so there is a folk story about fairies associated with the hill.

== Features ==
The cemetery is on a low but very prominent hill 1.5 km SW of the city centre, between the Caledonian Canal and the River Ness. The hilltop is at 70 m, and its topographic prominence is 53 m. The cemetery consists in two areas: a formal graveyard on the upper plateau, which also hosts a war memorial, and the Lower Cemetery, occupying the low ground around the hill. Some footpaths connect these two burial areas. The hillside is covered in woodland and provides a convenient habitat to several bird species. The hilltop offers a wide panorama on Inverness city, the Moray Firth and on the Ness Valley. The Tomahurich itself, as seen from the surrounding plain, is an important landmark.

== History ==
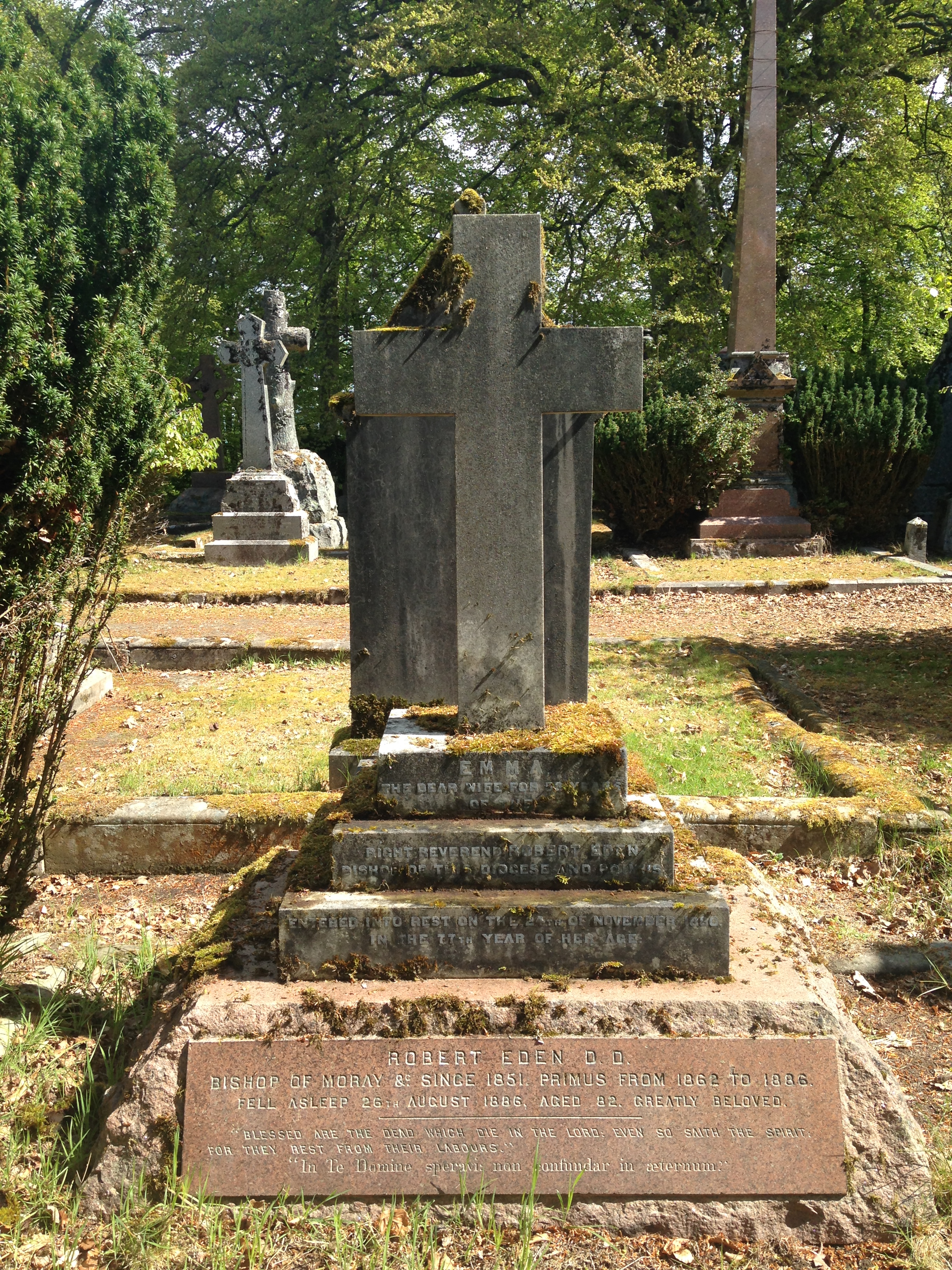
Grave of Bishop Robert Eden

Before its use as a cemetery the hill, due to its prominent location, hosted various social events such as an annual horse race, which used to take place around the hill on the 24–25th May. In 1753 the hill, which ground was considered too poor in quality for agriculture, was planted with trees, mainly Pinus sylvestris. The views offered from the hilltop were praised by artists and scientists. For instance Thomas Pennant climbed the Tomnahurich in the 18th century, reporting its name as Tommin heurich. In the second half of the 19th century the Inverness Cemetery Company, a joint-stock company, developed the present-day cemetery and opened it in 1864. Although its design is attributed to Charles Heath Wilson, a great deal of the work was done by George Grant Mackay, a Scottish civil engineer. The cemetery gradually expanded also around the hill, and in 1909 it was acquired by the Borough of Inverness. During the Second World War lots of metallic chains and iron parts were removed from the cemetery, to contribute in the national war effort.

== Artworks ==
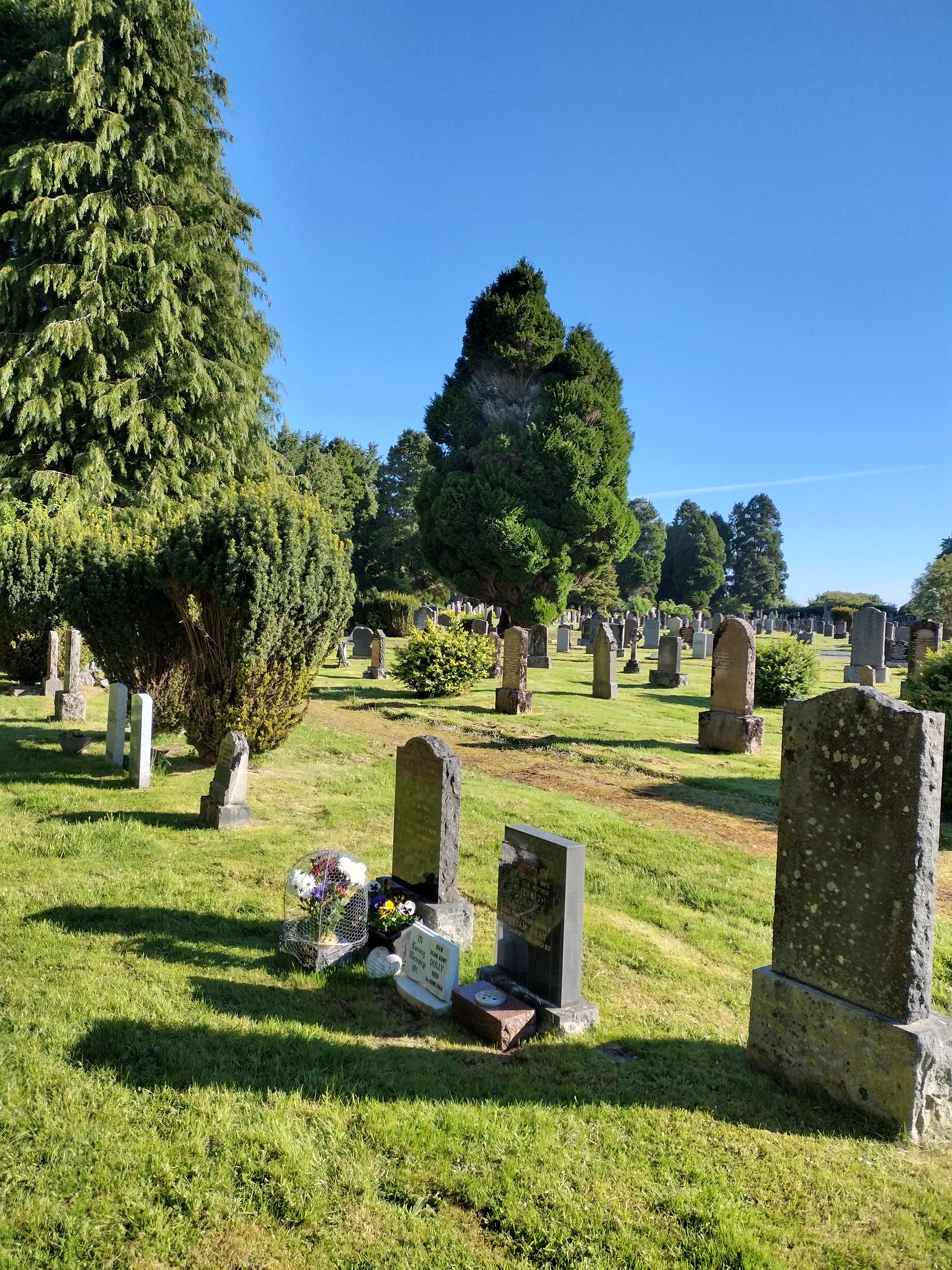
Low cemetery

Many tombstones and structures of the cemetery are of historic and architectural interest. Among them can be remembered the memorial monument to Mary Anne Lyall, of Andrew Davidson's (1841–1925), or the mausoleum of Henry Christie, with an armed angel statue guarding its marble door. Close to the main entrance stands a lodge designed by Alexander Ross in 1877.

== War graves ==
The cemetery contains 169 war graves of service personnel registered and maintained by the Commonwealth War Graves Commission, 89 from World War I and 80 from World War II, including 6 Polish personnel.

== See also ==
- Glasgow Necropolis
- Inventory of Gardens and Designed Landscapes in Scotland
