= Bishop of Moray, Ross and Caithness =

Diocesan bishop in the Scottish Episcopal Church

- Bishopric

anglican
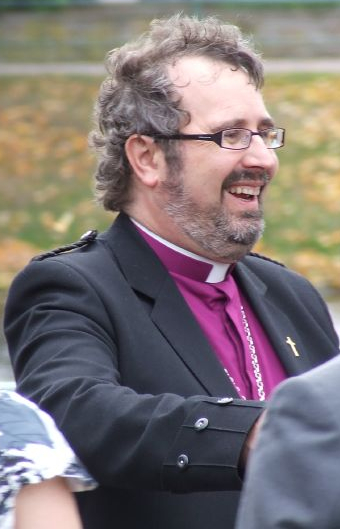
- Incumbent: Mark Strange

Location
- Ecclesiastical province: Scotland

Information
- Established: 1864
- Diocese: Moray, Ross and Caithness
- Cathedral: St Andrew's, Inverness

The Bishop of Moray, Ross and Caithness is the ordinary of the Scottish Episcopal Diocese of Moray, Ross and Caithness.

The bishop's seat (cathedra) is located at the Cathedral Church of St Andrew, Inverness, Scotland. The current bishop is Mark Strange who was elected on 2 June 2007 and consecrated and installed on 13 October 2007.

== Past and present bishops ==
Bishops of Moray, Ross and Caithness
| From | Until | Incumbent | Notes |
|---|---|---|---|
| 1864 | 1886 | Robert Eden | Consecrated as Bishop of Moray and Ross on 9 March 1851, became Bishop Moray, Ross and Caithness in 1864. Died in office on 26 August 1886. |
| 1886 | 1904 | James Kelly | Formerly Bishop of Newfoundland (1876–77). Appointed coadjutor bishop of Moray, Ross and Caithness in 1885 and succeeded as diocesan bishop in 1886. Also served as Provost of St Andrew's Cathedral, Inverness (1885–91) and Primus (1901–04). Retired as Primus on 27 May 1904 and bishop on 28 August 1904. Died on 15 May 1907. |
| 1904 | 1943 | Arthur Maclean | Consecrated on 21 December 1904. Also served as Primus (1935–1943). Died in office on 24 February 1943. |
| 1943 | 1952 | Piers Holt Wilson | Previously Dean of St Andrews, Dunkeld and Dunblane (1940–1943). Consecrated on 29 June 1943. Retired in 1952 and died on 3 February 1956. |
| 1953 | 1970 | Duncan MacInnes | Previously Dean of Argyll and The Isles (1946–1953). Consecrated on 13 January 1953. Died in office on 9 August 1970. |
| 1970 | 1993 | George Sessford | Formerly Rector of Forres. Elected and consecrated in 1970. Resigned in 1993 and died on 21 July 1996. |
| 1994 | 1998 | Gregor MacGregor | Consecrated on 3 September 1994. Retired in 1998 and died on 29 June 2003. |
| 1999 | 2007 | John Crook | Consecrated on 25 September 1999. Retired in 2007. |
| 2007 | present | Mark Strange | Formerly Rector of Elgin (1998–2007). Elected in June 2007 and consecrated on 13 October 2007. |
