= Edinburgh Theological College =

Coordinates: 55.9469°N 3.2204°W

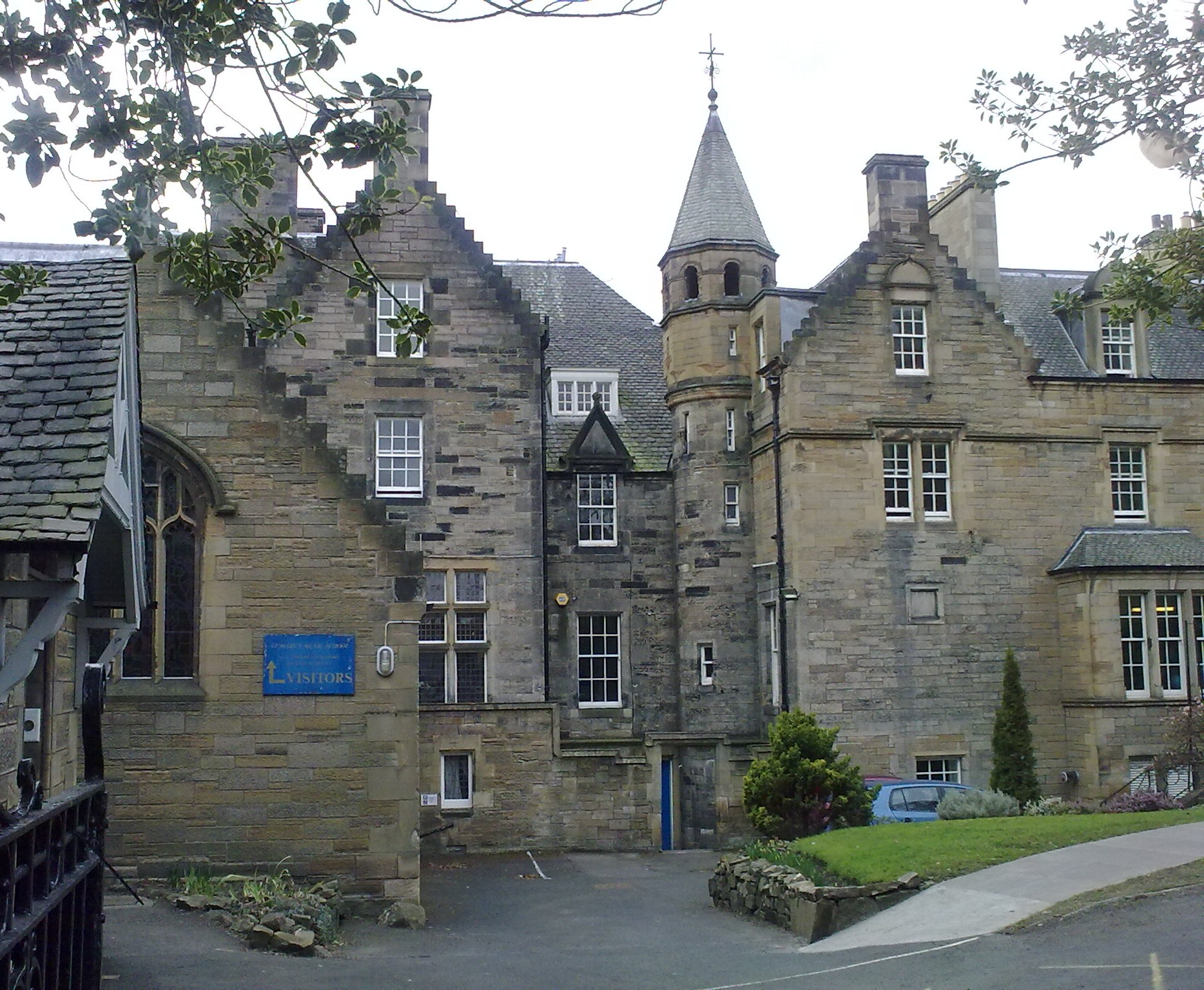
- The college buildings, now St Mary's Music School
- Active: 1810–1994
- Affiliations: Scottish Episcopal Church
- Location: Edinburgh
- Colours: Black & thistle green

The Edinburgh Theological College was founded in 1810 to train Anglican clergy to serve in the Scottish Episcopal Church. In 1891 the college moved to Coates Hall in Rosebery Avenue where it gradually expanded to include residential accommodation and a library. The college’s academic hood was black lined with thistle green. The college closed in 1994 and the site is now used by St Mary's Music School.

The Edinburgh Theological College was succeeded by the Theological Institute of the Scottish Episcopal Church (TISEC) in 1995, which was itself succeeded by the Scottish Episcopal Institute (SEI) in 2015.

== See also ==
- Alumni of Edinburgh Theological College
