= Diocese of Moray, Ross and Caithness =

Anglican diocese of the Scottish Episcopal Church

Coordinates: 57.477°N 4.231°W

Diocese of Moray, Ross and Caithness Dioecesis Moraviensis, Rossensis et Cathanensis

Location
- Country: Scotland
- Territory: Caithness, Sutherland, Ross and Cromarty, Inverness-shire, Nairnshire, Moray, Banffshire
- Ecclesiastical province: Scotland

Statistics
- Congregations: 39

Information
- Denomination: Scottish Episcopal Church
- Cathedral: St Andrew's Cathedral, Inverness

Current leadership
- Bishop: Mark Strange

Map
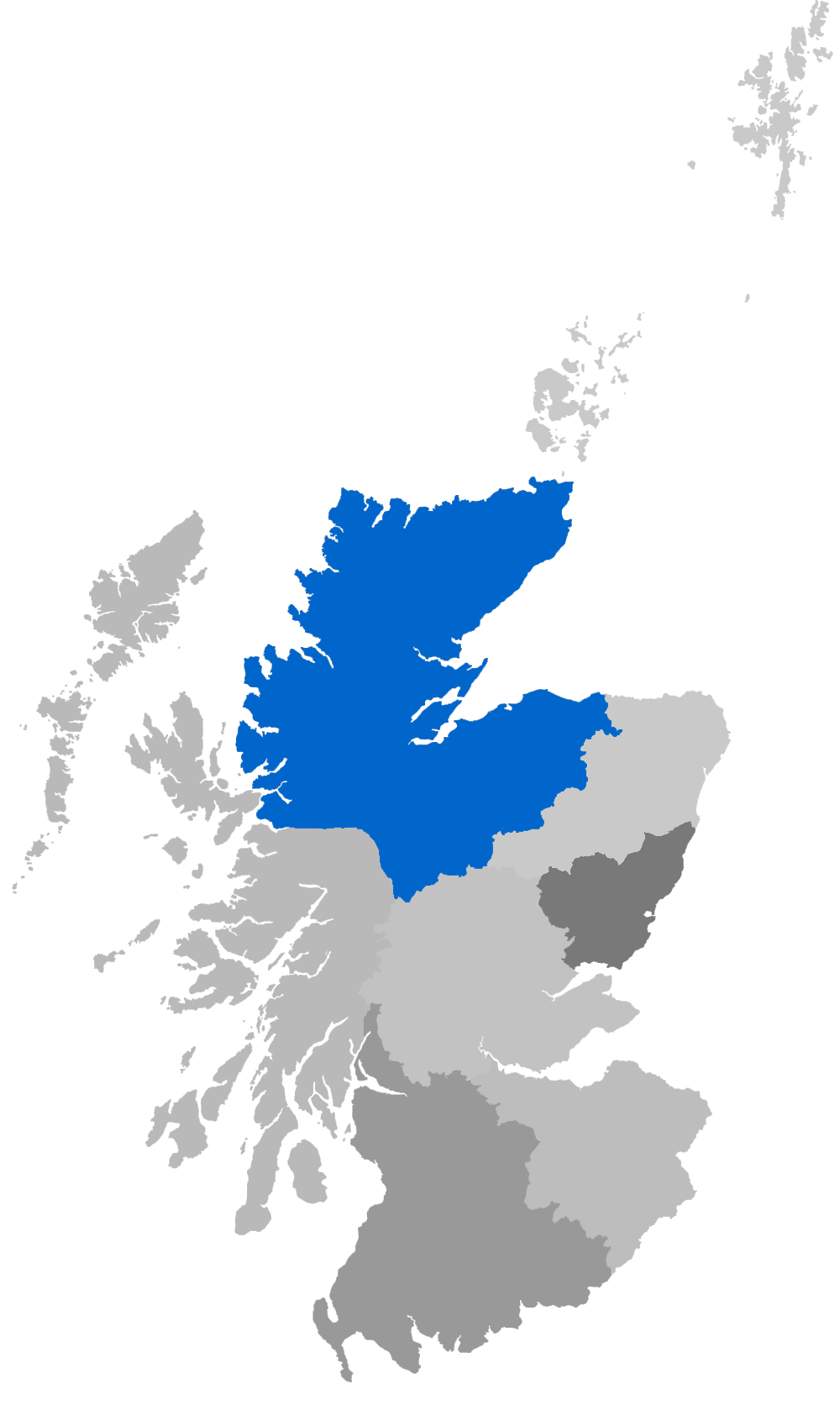
- Map showing Moray, Ross & Caithness Diocese within Scotland

Website
- moray.anglican.org

The Diocese of Moray, Ross and Caithness is one of the seven dioceses of the Scottish Episcopal Church. It covers Caithness and Sutherland (the old Diocese of Caithness), mainland Ross and Cromarty (the old Diocese of Ross), and mainland Inverness-shire, Nairnshire, Moray and Banffshire (the old Diocese of Moray). The diocesan centre is St Andrew's Cathedral in Inverness. The see is currently occupied by Mark Strange.

== History ==
The three old dioceses united in the modern diocese were all founded during the 12th century. Moray was founded by Gregory in 1114, Ross by Macbeth in 1131 and Caithness by Aindréas of Caithness in 1146. Being more removed from the centre of political power during the Scottish Reformation, each of the dioceses managed to continue an unbroken line of bishops. However, its remoteness also caused problems for the appointment of new bishops under the period of the penal laws. For part of the 17th century, both Ross and Caithness were without a bishop, and, at the beginning of the 18th century, the Diocese of Orkney was united with Caithness. In 1707, Alexander Rose, Bishop of Edinburgh and the first Primus, united Moray with his diocese for reason of practical oversight. John Fullarton, Rose's successor in both roles, continued to oversee Moray until 1725, when it was felt more practical to combine it with the Diocese of Aberdeen, led by James Gadderar. However, in 1727, the new Primus, Andrew Lumsden, appointed William Dunbar as sole Bishop of Moray and Ross, combining the vacant northern see with Moray. In 1777, William Falconar, also Primus, united Orkney, Moray, Ross and Caithness under his rule. In 1819, David Low was appointed Bishop of Ross by itself, but, from 1838 he administered the entire former union and the see officially returned to the union in 1851. In 1857, Orkney was separated to unite with the Diocese of Aberdeen. Mark Strange was elected as the new bishop on 2 June 2007 and was consecrated and installed on 13 October 2007. In 2020, Synod Clerk Rev Canon Michael Last reported an increase in membership and in number of communicants.

== Area and population ==
The diocese covers the historic counties of Caithness (population 26,500), Sutherland (population 13,000), mainland Ross and Cromarty (population 57,500), Inverness-shire except the Hebridean parts and Lochaber (population 88,500), Nairnshire (population 12,500), Morayshire (population 68,000), the Dufftown, Keith and Aberchirder areas of Banffshire (population 16,500), and the Huntly area of Aberdeenshire (population 8,000).

This total population of approximately 290,500 gives the diocese a ratio of one priest to every 18,200 inhabitants and one church to every 7,300 inhabitants.

== List of churches ==
The diocese currently has 16 stipendiary clergy and 40 church buildings.

Parish	Churches	Founded	Link	Stipendiary clergy
Aberchirder	St Marnan, Aberchirder	1824		Michael Last
Keith	Holy Trinity, Keith	1688		Michael Last
Huntly	Christ Church, Huntly	1719		Michael Last
Fochabers Gordon Chapel	Gordon Chapel of St Elizabeth, Fochabers	1834		Michael Last
Dufftown	St Michael, Dufftown			Michael Last
Aberlour	St Margaret of Scotland, Aberlour	1875		Vacant since 2012
Elgin with Lossiemouth	Holy Trinity, Elgin	c. 1700		Tembu Rongong
Elgin with Lossiemouth	St Margaret, Lossiemouth	1853		Tembu Rongong
Elgin with Lossiemouth	Burghead Mission			Tembu Rongong
Rothiemurchus	St John the Baptist, Rothiemurchus	1904		Vacant since 2001
Grantown-On-Spey	St Columba, Grantown-on-Spey	1870		Vacant since 2010
Forres	St John the Evangelist, Forres	1841		Hamilton Inbadas
Nairn	St Columba, Nairn	1853		Alison Simpson
Inverness Cathedral	St Andrew's Cathedral, Inverness	1853		Sarah Murray John Cuthbert Laura Symon Ross Royden
Inverness (St John the Evangelist)	St John the Evangelist, Inverness	1691		John Cuthbert
Inverness (St Michael & All Angels)	St Michael & All Angels, Inverness	1881		John Cuthbert
Culloden	St Mary-in-the-Fields, Culloden	1973		Vacant since 2012
Strathnairn	St Paul, Strathnairn	1688		Alison Simpson
Glenurquhart	St Ninian, Glenurquhart	1853		Rob Hardwick
Gordonstoun	St Christopher's Chapel & Michael Kirk			
Fortrose	St Andrew, Fortrose	1688		Alex Lane
Arpafeelie	St John the Evangelist, Arpafeelie	1688		Alex Lane
Cromarty	St Regulus, Cromarty	1877		Alex Lane
Poolewe	St Maelrubha, Poolewe	1950		Vacant since 2013
Kishorn Chapel	Courthill Chapel, Kishorn	1901		Vacant since 2013
Lochalsh	St Donnan, Lochalsh	1943		Vacant since 2013
Strathpeffer	St Anne, Strathpeffer			Julia Boothby
Dingwall	St James the Great, Dingwall	1704		Julia Boothby
Invergordon	St Ninian, Invergordon	1915		Julia Boothby
Lochinver	St Gilbert's Mission, Kinlochbervie			Clare Caley
Lochinver	St Gilbert of Caithness, Lochinver			Clare Caley
Ullapool	St Mary the Virgin, Ullapool	1975		Clare Caley
Ullapool	St Boniface of Ross, Achiltibuie			Clare Caley
Tongue	St Mary-by-the-Cross, Tongue	2003		Simon Scott
Dornoch	St Finnbarr, Dornoch	1903		Simon Scott
Tain	St Andrew, Tain	1877		Simon Scott
Lairg	St Maelrubha's Mission, Lairg			Simon Scott
Brora	St Columba of Iona, Brora	1909		Simon Scott
Thurso	St Peter & Holy Rood, Thurso	1884		
Wick	St John the Evangelist, Wick	1870		

== See also ==
- Bishop of Moray, Ross and Caithness
