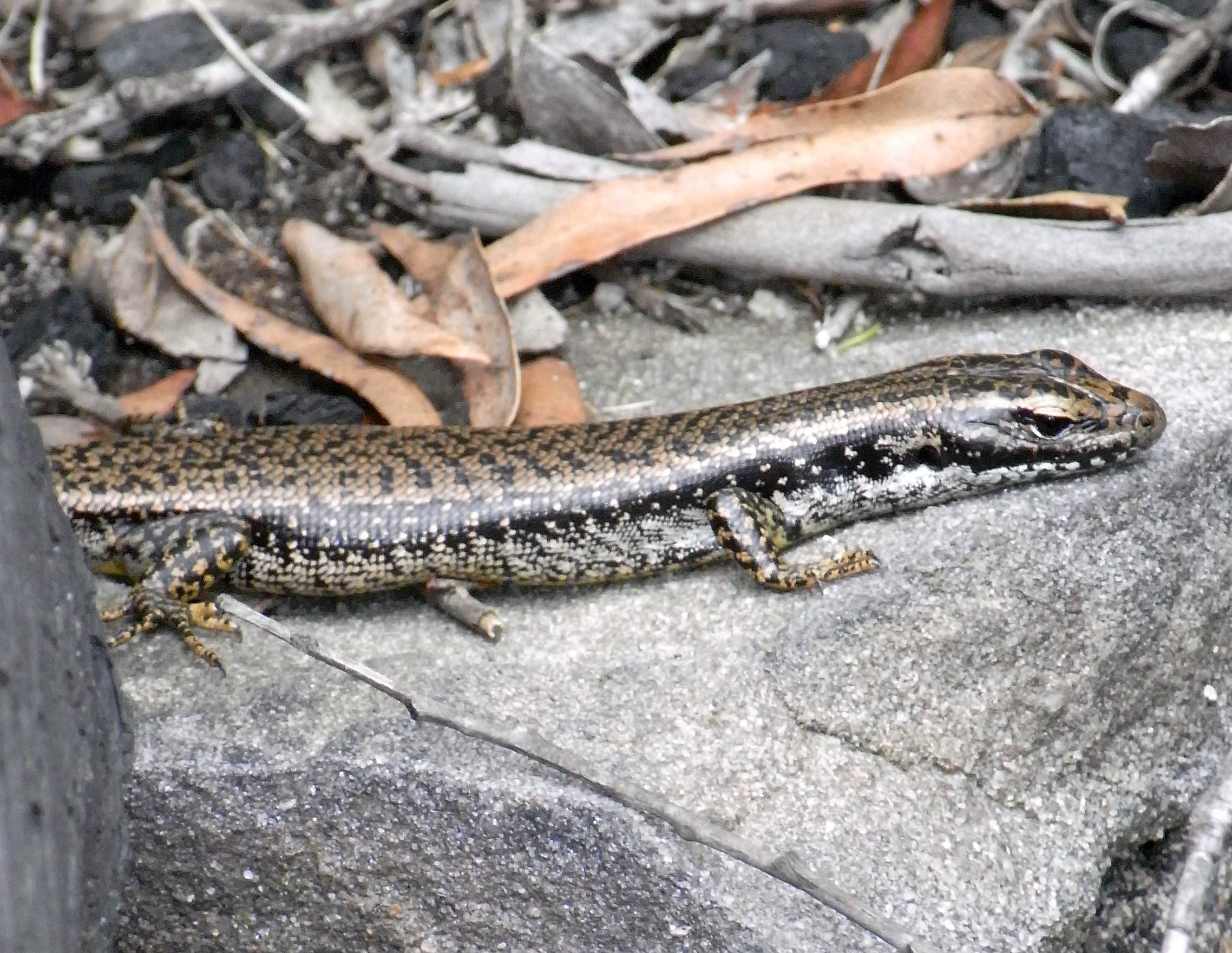
- Eulamprus quoyii (golden water skink)

Scientific classification
- Kingdom: Animalia
- Phylum: Chordata
- Class: Reptilia
- Order: Squamata
- Family: Scincidae
- Subfamily: Sphenomorphinae
- Genus: Eulamprus; Fitzinger, 1843

Species
- Five, see text.

= Eulamprus =

Genus of lizards

Eulamprus is a genus of lizards, commonly known as water skinks, in the subfamily Sphenomorphinae of the family Scincidae. The genus is native to Australia.

== Taxonomy ==
The genus Eulamprus belongs to a clade in the Sphenomorphus group that contains other genera such as Ctenotus and Anomalopus. The molecular phylogenetic studies of O'Connor and Moritz (2003) and Skinner et al. (2013) found that species assigned to Eulamprus comprised four independent lineages within the Australian Sphenomorphus group and did not form a clade. The genus Eulamprus was restricted to the water skinks, with other species assigned to Concinnia (including species formerly in the monotypic genera Gnypetoscincus and Nangura), Silvascincus and Tumbunascincus.

== Species ==
The following five species are recognized as being valid.

- Eulamprus heatwolei Wells & Wellington, 1983 – warm-temperate water-skink, Heatwole's water skink
- Eulamprus kosciuskoi (Kinghorn, 1932) – alpine meadow-skink, alpine water skink
- Eulamprus leuraensis Wells & Wellington, 1983 – Blue Mountains water skink, Blue Mountain swamp-skink
- Eulamprus quoyii (A.M.C. Duméril & Bibron, 1839) – golden water skink, eastern water-skink, eastern water skink
- Eulamprus tympanum (Lönnberg & Andersson, 1915) – southern water skink, cool-temperate water-skink, highland water skink, Dreeite water skink

Nota bene: A binomial authority in parentheses indicates that the species was originally described in a genus other than Eulamprus.

== Species formerly placed in Eulamprus ==
- Concinnia ampla (Covacevich & McDonald, 1980) – lemon-barred forest-skink
- Concinnia brachyosoma (Lönnberg & Andersson, 1915) – northern barsided skink
- Concinnia frerei (Greer, 1992) – stout barsided skink
- Concinnia martini Wells & Wellington, 1983 – dark barsided skink
- Concinnia sokosoma (Greer, 1992) – stout barsided skink
- Concinnia tenuis (Gray, 1831) bar-sided forest-skink, barred-sided skink
- Concinnia tigrina (De Vis, 1888) – yellow-blotched forest-skink, rainforest water-skink
- Silvascincus murrayi (Boulenger, 1887) – blue-speckled forest-skink
- Silvascincus tryoni (Longman, 1918) – Border Ranges blue-spectacled skink, forest skink, Tryon's skink
- Tumbunascincus luteilateralis (Covacevich & McDonald, 1980) – orange-speckled forest-skink
