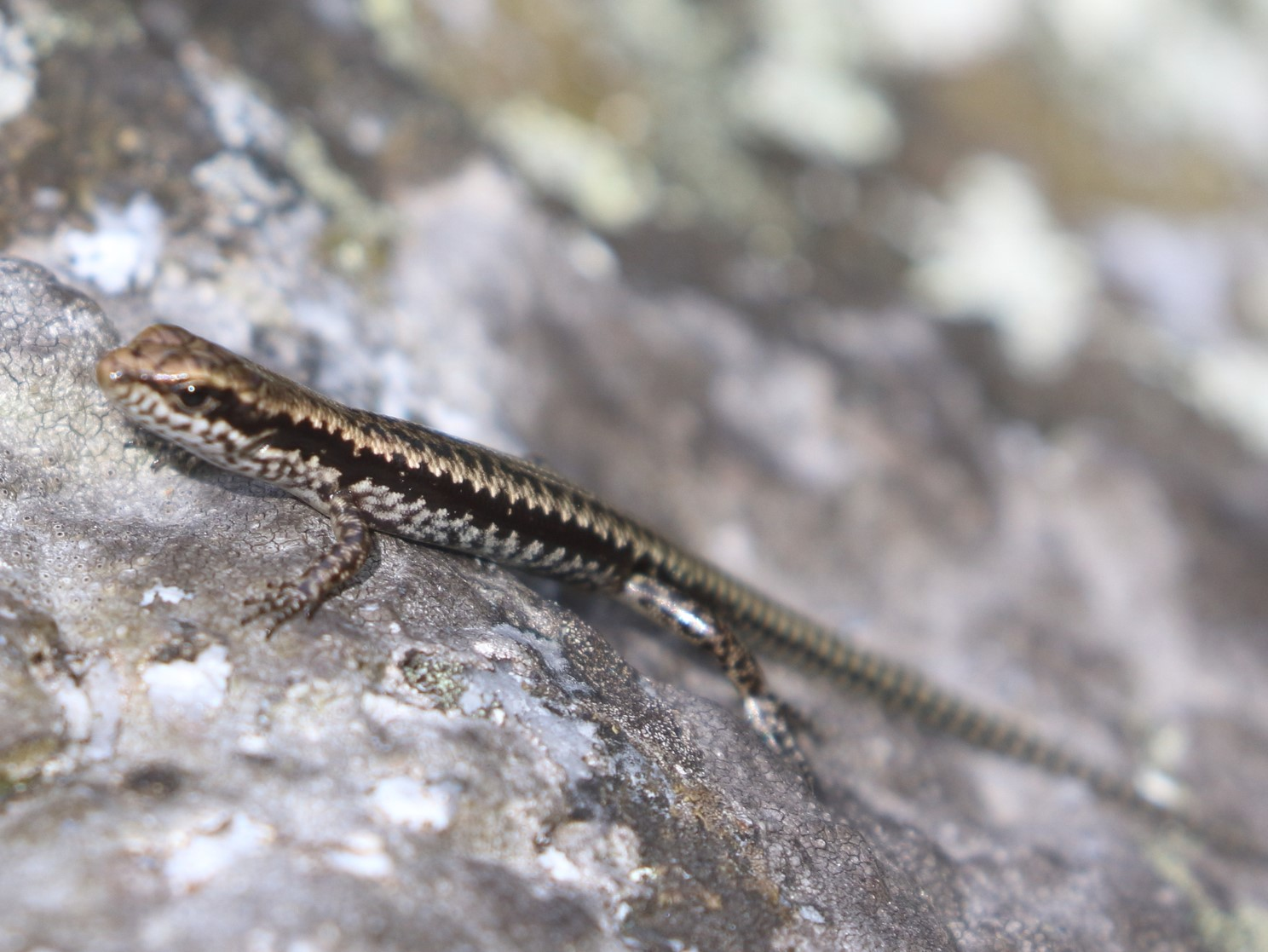
- Concinnia martini

Scientific classification
- Kingdom: Animalia
- Phylum: Chordata
- Class: Reptilia
- Order: Squamata
- Family: Scincidae
- Subfamily: Sphenomorphinae
- Genus: Concinnia; Wells and Wellington, 1983

Species
- 7, see text

= Concinnia =

Genus of lizards

Concinnia is a genus of skinks in the subfamily Sphenomorphinae.

== Taxonomy and systematics ==
The genus Concinnia belongs to the Australian Sphenomorphid clade that contains other genera such as Ctenotus, Anomalopus and the Eulamprus water skinks. This genus was raised by Skinner et al.(2013) based on molecular phylogenetic analysis of mitochondrial and nuclear DNA sequences, which showed that five sampled species from the Eulamprus tenuis group formed a well supported clade with the then monotypic genera Gnypetoscincus and Nangura. Wells and Wellington (1983) coined the name Concinnia and applied it to the Eulamprus tenuis group delimited by Greer (1989). Although this tenuis group may form a clade it did not receive strong support in molecular phylogenetic analyses, with C. amplus and C. frerei forming deep lineages of uncertain position relative to C. queenslandiae and C. spinosus. Consequently, Skinner et al. (2013) united the well supported broader clade, including Gnypetoscincus and Nangura in Concinnia, including C. frerei and C. sokosoma based on the work of O'Connor and Moritz (2003). Skinner et al. (2013) further restricted the genus Eulamprus to the water skinks assigned by Greer (1989) to the Eulamprus quoyii group and created two new genera, Silvascincus for species in Greer's (1989) Eulamprus murrayi group (including E. murrayi and E. tryoni), and Tumbunascincus for Eulamprus luteilateralis.

== Species ==
There are currently 7 recognized species:

- Concinnia ampla Covacevich & McDonald, 1980 – lemon-barred forest-skink
- Concinnia brachyosoma (Lönnberg and Andersson, 1915) – northern barsided skink
- Concinnia frerei Greer, 1992 – stout barsided skink
- Concinnia martini Wells & Wellington, 1983 – dark barsided skink
- Concinnia sokosoma Greer, 1992 – stout barsided skink
- Concinnia tenuis (Gray, 1831) bar-sided forest-skink, barred-sided skink
- Concinnia tigrina (De Vis, 1888) – yellow-blotched forest-skink, rainforest water-skink

Hinulia elegans, described by Gray in 1838, is an unidentified lygosomine that may be Concinnia tenuis.
