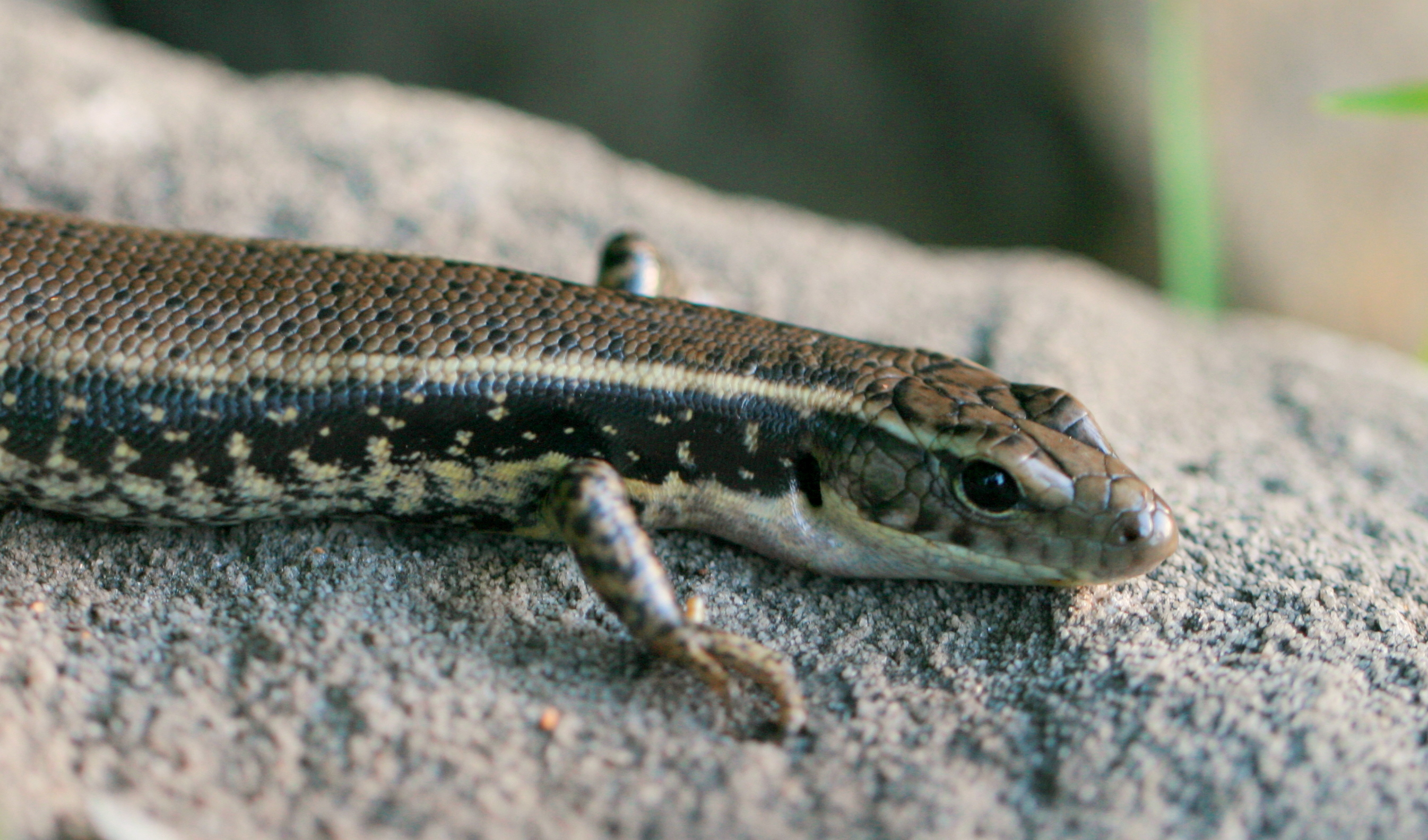
- Facial detail of a Sydney individual

Conservation status
- Least Concern (IUCN 3.1)

Scientific classification
- Kingdom: Animalia
- Phylum: Chordata
- Class: Reptilia
- Order: Squamata
- Family: Scincidae
- Genus: Eulamprus
- Species: E. quoyii

Binomial name
- Eulamprus quoyii (A.M.C. Duméril & Bibron, 1839)

Synonyms
- Scincus vittatus Quoy & Gaimard, 1824 (not S. vittatus Olivier, 1804); Lygosoma quoyii A.M.C. Duméril & Bibron, 1839 (nomen novum); Hinulia gastrosticta Günther, 1875; Sphenomorphus quoyi — Barbour, 1914; Lygosoma (Sphenomorphus) quoyi — M.A. Smith, 1937; Sphenomorphus quoyii — Cogger, 1983; Eulamprus quoyii — Cogger, 1983

= Eulamprus quoyii =

Species of lizard

Eulamprus quoyii, more commonly known as the eastern water skink, eastern water-skink, or golden water skink, is a viviparous species of diurnal skink. Eulamprus quoyii belongs to the family Scincidae and is considered a common garden animal in Australia. The skink is endemic to Australia and found only along the east coast of the country. It makes its home in creekside habitats along the east coast of Australia and in urban garden areas with high amounts of moisture. The species can be identified by the twin, long yellow stripes that run along its body from the top of the eye, as well as by several more specific character derived states. The pale yellow dorsolateral stripes are most likely where its common name, the golden water skink, is derived. Like other ectotherms, the skink can often be seen basking in the sun on rocky outcroppings in order to regulate its body temperature. Its diet mainly consists of both aquatic and terrestrial insects, tadpoles and small amounts of plant matter. The skink both hunts for food and scavenges when necessary and is considered an opportunistic feeder. It is prey to larger lizards, snakes, cats and birds and so will often be seen moving quickly into hiding when other organisms are present.

== Etymology ==
The genus name Eulamprus is derived from the Latin meaning "good-beautiful". The specific name, quoyii, is in honor of French zoologist Jean René Constant Quoy.

== Taxonomy ==
Eulamprus quoyii belongs to the genus Eulamprus which is a part of the subfamily Lygosominae of the family Scincidae. The genus, among others such as Ctenotus and Anomalopus, falls within a clade in the Sphenomorphus group. Phylogenetic research into the genus revealed that the Eulamprus assigned species were four independent lineages, causing the Eulamprus genus to be confined to water skinks alone. Other species previously categorised within the Eulamprus genus were assigned to Concinnia, Silvascincus and Tumbunascincus. Eulamprus quoyii has several derived character states which separate the species from other species within the genus. However, there are few if any differences in preferred habitat selection within the E. quoyii group, implying a strong evolutionary consequence for the species due to previous environmental changes.

== Description ==
Eulamprus quoyii is a large water skink that can grow to approximately 115mm in snout-vent length (SVL). They have sharply defined, narrow, pale-yellow dorsolateral stripes that start from above the eye and extend down the body but lack the typical black vertebral stripe of other species in the genus. Its body is medium-sized and has a long slender tail. It has a blackish upper lateral zone with pale spots and its head and snout are moderately acute. Each of its two front limbs have five fingers while the two back limbs have five toes. Its ventral area is cream in colour with some randomly scattered darker spots that differ between individuals. Its throat is white with darker black patches.

There is minor sexual dimorphism within the species resulting in the females having a slightly longer snout-vent length and the males to have proportionately longer limbs and heads. The difference in SVL between females and males is not statistically significant. There is a significant difference in shape between sexes of both adult and neonate E. quoyii. In adult male water skinks the distance between the forelimbs and hindlimbs, or the trunk length, are typically shorter than females. Males are known to have longer limbs, wider heads and a greater mass than females of the species. In male E. quoyii specimens; forelimb length, head width and overall mass all increase significantly more quickly with increased SVL growth than in females. However, this does not apply to hindlimbs or trunk length which both increase at the same rate in females and males as the SVL increases. In neonates, body shape is much more similar between the sexes with the exception of the female trunk length which is significantly longer than the male counterparts.

Within the Eulamprus complex several features are shared by all species including E. quoyii. Individual organisms' nasal passages are separated medially while they do not have any supranasal and postnasal scales. Individuals have two subequal loreal scales and a single preocular scale with a moveable lower scaly eyelid. The iris and pupil are both black and are indistinguishable from each other during the skinks life. The Eastern water skink has three presubocular scales, one of which penetrates downwards in front of the scales on the upper lip and upper jaw. The Eulamprus species show two or three scales beneath the eye and four above the eye, these are called subocular and supraocular scales respectively. Some of the supraoculars will be in contact the frontal scales. Two or three postocular scales lie behind but in contact with the eye and sit between the posterior supraciliary scale and the parietal eye.

The E. quoyii species group specifically shares four derived character states that separate it from other species within the Eulamprus genus. The first of which is a third pair of chin shields separated by five smaller scales. Secondly, E. quoyii do not have inguinal fat bodies in both males and females that is commonly seen in other Scincidae species. This is what causes the species slender, elongated appearance. The third character state is the single row of distal supradigital scales seen on E. quoyii as opposed to the usual two or more rows observed in other species. Lastly, each lamellae on the underside of the toes are grooved and divided at the base.

== Behaviour ==
=== Breeding and reproduction ===
When Eulamprus quoyii breed, male and females of the species mate in Spring and will give birth to up to nine babies per clutch in the Summer. Unlike many other reptile species, the Eastern Water Skink is a viviparous species and will give birth to live young following their long gestation periods. Due to the length of these gestation periods, it is common for female E. quoyii individuals to mate only once a year. Male individuals differ from the females in that they can be classified into two categories: Territorial/Resident males and Floater Males. Resident males are suspected to be more active over a longer period, producing clutches with a higher yield of offspring. Floater males are predicted to have larger home ranges and move greater distances while active, leading to fewer clutches and offspring per year. Sexual selection in the E. quoyii species is not believed to have a direct correlation to performance and fitness traits such as bite force or speed as it does in other lizard species. Previous research has shown that there does seem to be a correlation between SVL and sexual selection in E. quoyii, however, due to the adoption of alternate reproductive tactics (ART) in the species, there is the chance that specific performance traits are correlated with other unmeasured behavioural, morphological or physiological traits.

=== Nesting ===
Depending on the urban landscape and habitat, the nesting habits of the eastern water skink will change from area to area. When found in a highly urban areas including backyards or city parks, E. quoyii will often create nests in moist soil areas and under logs or rocks in the garden, Outside of these urban areas E. quoyii have similar nesting habits to other species in the Scincidae family. Despite being ground dwellers, they have been known to nest above ground level, on sandstone outcrops in the narrow, broken crevices that are available. They choose areas with a low canopy openness in order to avoid predation and actively choose sites with lower UV radiation which still have very high humidity levels. All nesting areas are found in close proximity to small bodies of water or in areas where water and moisture are highly available. The Eastern water skink has also been known to nest in both communal and solitary nesting sites.

=== Diet ===
Eulamprus quoyii are by nature opportunistic predators and feed on both aquatic and terrestrial prey. Their diet consists of, but is not limited too: water beetles and other aquatic insects, snails, tadpoles, spiders, small fish and smaller lizards. The Eastern water skink has also been known to feed on native fruit and other plant materials when available. Like others in the Scincidae family, Eastern Water Skinks have no need to eat every day but will do so when the conditions are favourable. Their range of dietary options for are extensive due to favourable habitat selection factors and the presence of small bodies of water in their chosen habitats. This leads to a more active ecosystem and offers a wider variety of food options available for both scavenging and predation by the skink.

=== Predation ===
E. quoyii are both predators and scavengers when meeting their own dietary requirements. They are known to also be prey to a number of larger terrestrial organisms such as birds, big lizards, snakes, turtles and cats. A common predator of the Eastern Water Skink is the Australian Laughing Kookaburra, Dacelo novaeguineae. It is unknown whether the Eastern Water Skink is also preyed upon by any larger aquatic animals, yet it is suspected that crayfish are a minor predator of the species. The eastern water skink has strong behavioural tendencies towards flight when provoked or threatened by predators. Despite the territorial nature of some males, due to the relative body size of the species and the high number of predators in waterside habitats, the skink is known to race away from basking sites at the first sense of danger.

== Habitat ==
The Eastern Water Skink can be found in creekside habitats, estuaries or near small to medium-sized bodies of water as well as in moist urban garden areas along Australia's East Coast cities. Outside of the urban environment, E. quoyii population densities are highest in open, rocky creek areas compared to creek or water areas with thick vegetation or cool forest conditions. Areas with rocky outcroppings and high availability of sunlight have a direct correlation with the abundance of E. quoyii populations. E. quoyii habitat selection is not chosen through abundance or lack of outcroppings and vegetation, but is selected through substrate temperature and necessary thermoregulation factors for the species.

== Distribution ==
As the common name implies, the Eastern Water Skink is most often found in areas along Australia's temperate east coast. They have been known to be found in the Australian Capital Territory, New South Wales, Queensland, South Australia and Victoria. Australia's east coast has contained temperate, moist patches of rainforest that have changed over the course of millions of years and is hypothesised to have covered a much broader area of the continent prior to the arid conditions in the mid-Miocene period. The contraction, expansion and fragmentation of these swathes of rainforest are believed to have fundamentally altered the distribution of the E. quoyii species to the current specific regions along the east coast. Through phylogenetic studies into the mtDNA sequences of the E. quoyii and a comparison of the landscape evolution in Eastern Australia their distribution is suspected to be controlled by biogeographic barriers. Breaks in their population correlate with areas where the Great Escarpment is absent, this suggests that topographically low areas and the accompanying dry forestry surrounding them act as a barrier for the distribution of the Eastern Water Skink populations.
