= Anomalopus mackayi =

Conservation status
- Least Concern (IUCN 3.1)

Scientific classification
- Kingdom: Animalia
- Phylum: Chordata
- Class: Reptilia
- Order: Squamata
- Family: Scincidae
- Genus: Anomalopus
- Species: A. mackayi

Binomial name
- Anomalopus mackayi Greer & Cogger, 1985

Species of lizard

Anomalopus mackayi, commonly known as the five-clawed worm skink, the long-legged worm skink, and Mackay's burrowing skink, is a species of smooth-scaled burrowing skink, a lizard in the subfamily Sphenomorphinae of the family Scincidae. The species is endemic to eastern Australia.

== Etymology ==
The specific name, mackayi, is in honor of Australian herpetologist Roy D. Mackay.

== Behaviour and habitat ==
Anomalopus mackayi generally burrows in areas with black soil and few trees.

== Description ==
Anomalopus mackayi usually grows to a snout-to-vent length (SVL) of about 10 cm (3.9 in). A. mackayi is similar to A. leuckartii but with distinctly didactyle (having two digits) hindlimbs, a central dark spot within each individual scale, and is yellow-green below with darker flecks (Cogger 2000).

== Reproduction ==
Adult females of Anomalopus mackayi give birth to live young by ovoviviparity.

== Conservation status ==
Anomalopus mackayi is listed as "Least Concern" under the 2018 IUCN Red List, and as "Endangered" under Queensland's Nature Conservation Act 1992.
