= Stout barsided skink =

There are two species of lizard named stout barsided skink:

- Concinnia frerei
- Concinnia sokosoma
