= Leptoseps osellai =

Conservation status
- Least Concern (IUCN 3.1)

Scientific classification
- Kingdom: Animalia
- Phylum: Chordata
- Class: Reptilia
- Order: Squamata
- Family: Scincidae
- Genus: Leptoseps
- Species: L. osellai

Binomial name
- Leptoseps osellai (Böhme, 1981)

Synonyms
- Larutia osellai Böhme, 1981

Species of lizard

Leptoseps osellai, also known commonly as Osella's skink, is a species of lizard in the subfamily Sphenomorphinae of the family Scincidae. The species is endemic to Thailand.

== Etymology ==
The specific name osellai is in honor of Italian entomologist Giuseppe Osella.

== Description ==
Leptoseps osellai has four digits on each of its four feet. It has 18 rows of scales around the body at midbody.

== Geographic distribution ==
Leptoseps osellai is found in Chiang Mai province, Thailand.

== Habitat ==
The preferred natural habitat of Leptoseps osellai is forest, at elevations of 500–600 m (1,600–2,000 ft).

== Behavior ==
Leptoseps osellai is terrestrial, sheltering under logs from fallen trees.

== Reproduction ==
The mode of reproduction of Leptoseps osellai is unknown.
