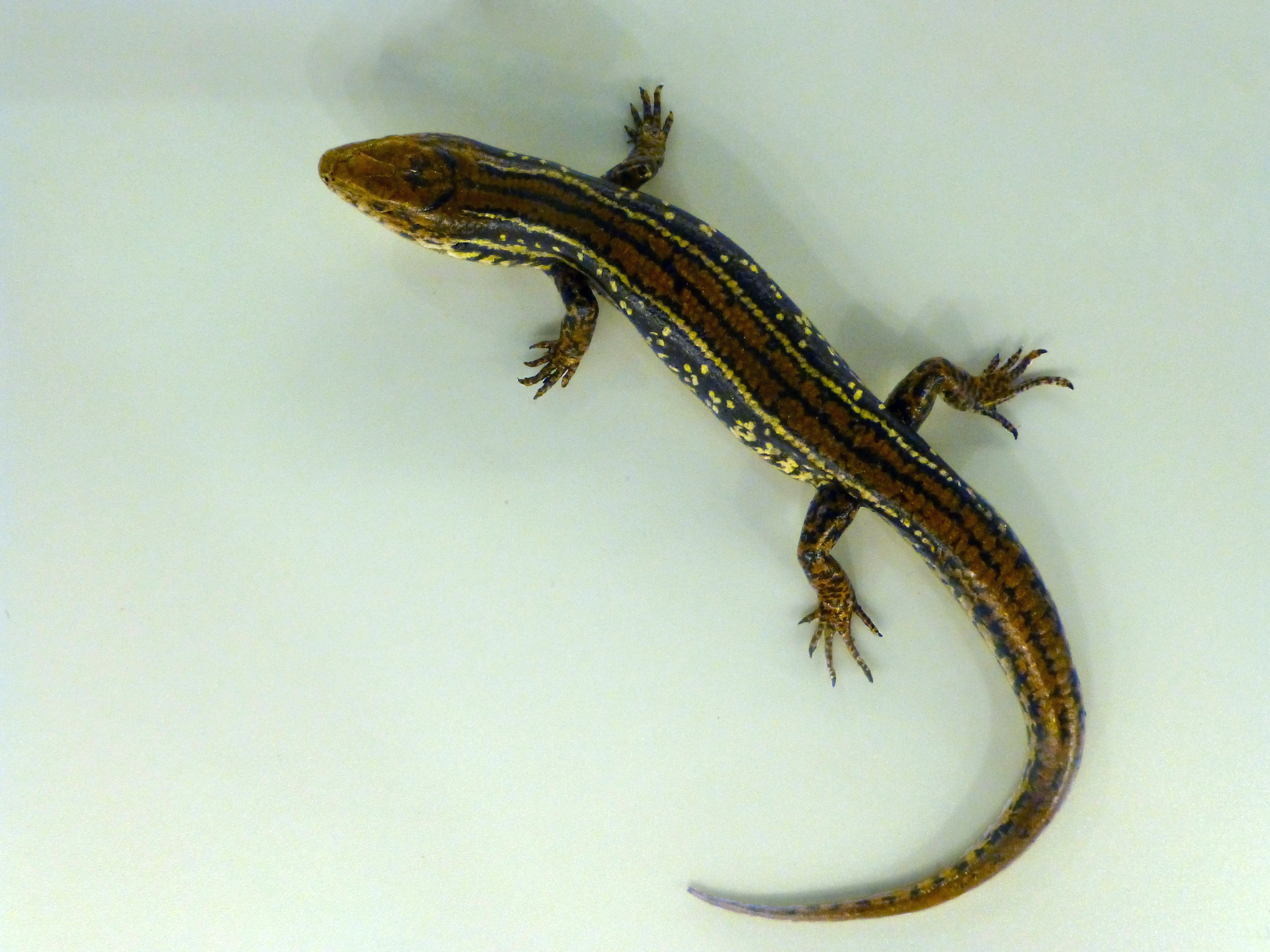

Conservation status
- Least Concern (IUCN 3.1)

Scientific classification
- Kingdom: Animalia
- Phylum: Chordata
- Class: Reptilia
- Order: Squamata
- Family: Scincidae
- Genus: Eulamprus
- Species: E. kosciuskoi

Binomial name
- Eulamprus kosciuskoi (Kinghorn, 1932)

Synonyms
- Lygosoma quoyi kosciuskoi Kinghorn, 1932; Sphenomorphus kosciuskoi (Kinghorn, 1932)

= Eulamprus kosciuskoi =

Species of lizard

Eulamprus kosciuskoi, also known commonly as the alpine meadow-skink and the alpine water skink, is a species of lizard in the subfamily Sphenomorphinae of the family Scincidae. The species is native to eastern Australia.

== Etymology ==
The specific name, kosciuskoi, refers to Mount Kosciuszko, Australia's highest mountain, where the holotype was collected.

== Description ==
E. kosciuskoi may attain a snout-to-vent length (SVL) of 8.5 cm (3.3 in). It has a narrow black vertebral stripe and yellow dorsolateral stripes.

== Geographic range ==
E. kosciuskoi is found in the Australian states of New South Wales, Queensland, and Victoria.

== Habitat ==
The preferred natural habitats of E. kosciuskoi are forest, shrubland, grassland, and freshwater wetlands, at altitudes above 1,000 m (3,300 ft).

== Reproduction ==
E. kosciuskoi is ovoviviparous.
