= N. spinosa =

N. spinosa may refer to:

- Nangura spinosa, a skink species in the genus Nangura
- Naraoia spinosa, a trilobite species
- Neocteniza spinosa, a spider species in the genus Neocteniza
- Nepenthes spinosa, a tropical pitcher plant species
- Nephroselmis spinosa, an alga species in the genus Nephroselmis
- Nezumia spinosa, a fish species in the genus Nezumia

== See also ==
- Spinosa (disambiguation)
