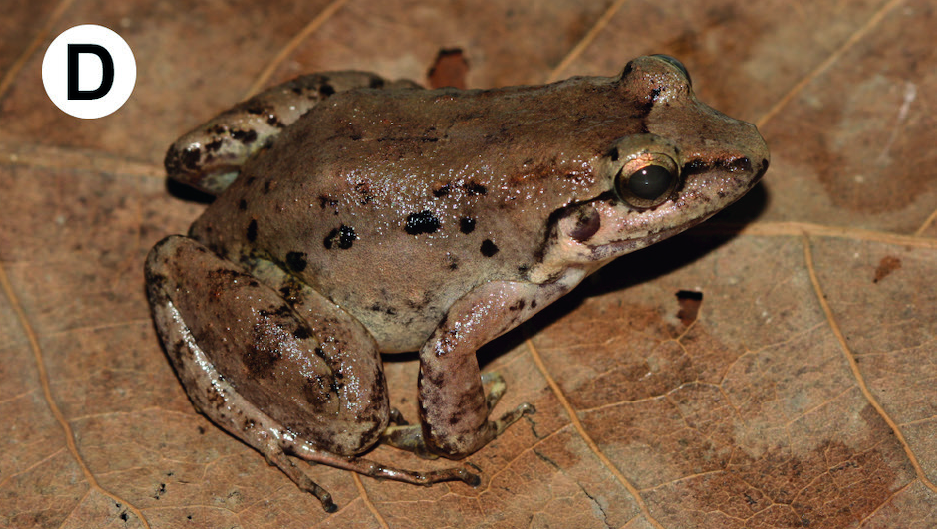
- Amapá, Brazil

Conservation status
- Least Concern (IUCN 3.1)

Scientific classification
- Kingdom: Animalia
- Phylum: Chordata
- Class: Amphibia
- Order: Anura
- Family: Leptodactylidae
- Genus: Leptodactylus
- Species: L. leptodactyloides

Binomial name
- Leptodactylus leptodactyloides (Andersson, 1945)

Synonyms
- Eleutherodactylus leptodactyloides Andersson, 1945; Leptodactylus leptodactyloides Heyer, 1994

= Leptodactylus leptodactyloides =

Species of frogs

Leptodactylus leptodactyloides is a species of frogs in the family Leptodactylidae. It is endemic to the greater Amazon biome.

== Taxonomy and etymology ==
The first description of the species was published in 1945 by Lars Gabriel Andersson, who placed it in the genus Eleutherodactylus and gave it the specific name leptodactyloides; Leptodactylus, from the Greek leptos ('fine', 'slender', 'thin') and daktylos ('digits', 'fingers'), with the generic Latin suffix -us replaced with -oides, derived from the Greek -oeidēs ('resembling', 'form of'). The species was moved to Leptodactylus by Ronald Heyer in 1994, resulting in the tautology Leptodactylus leptodactyloides.

== Description ==
Male L. leptodactyloides usually have snout–vent lengths length of 28–48 mm (1.1–1.9 in) and females to 35–57 mm (1.4–2.2 in).

== Reproduction ==
The frogs builds foam nests for their eggs. The female frog has shown parental care; if the tadpoles deplete the food in one pool of water, she will dig a channel to another.

== Distribution and habitat ==
L. leptodactyloides is endemic to the Amazon biome, being found in Bolivia, Brazil, Colombia, Ecuador, French Guiana, Guyana, Peru, Suriname and Venezuela. It can be found in both the Amazon rainforest, including in floodplain and Várzea forest areas, and in the outer areas of the greater biome, including peripheral forest and savannas. It can also be found in areas affected by human disturbances, such as in secondary forest, pastures and gardens. It has been sighted at elevations of 15–400 m (50–1,310 ft).

L. leptodactyloides is subject to localized habitat loss, but is as of its 2021 IUCN Red List assessment considered a least-concern species.
