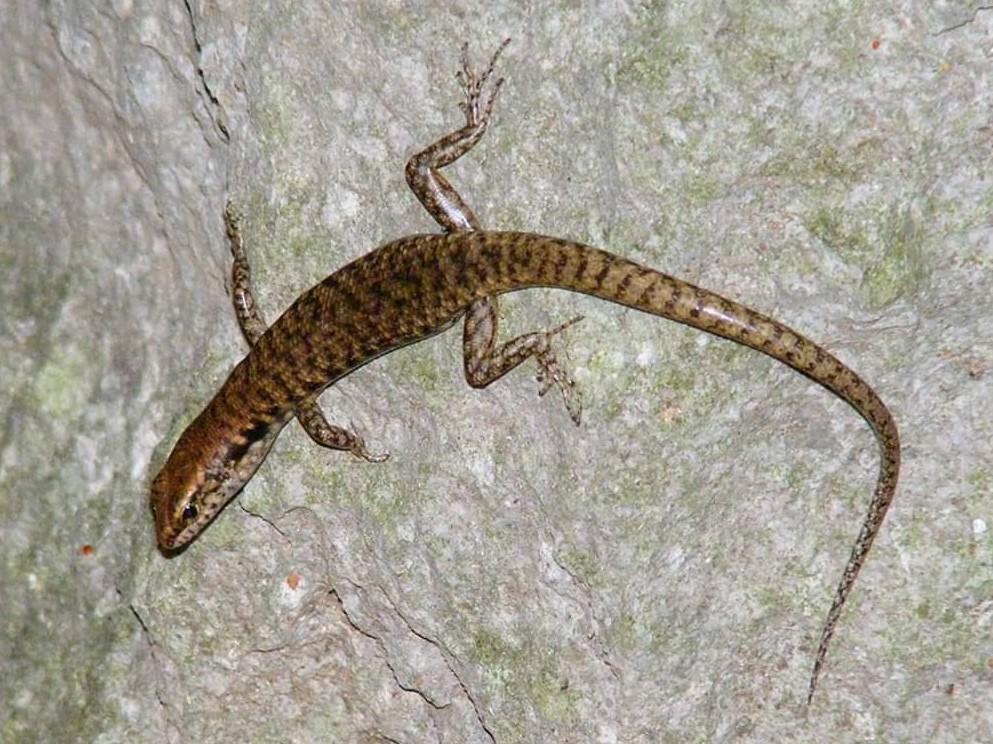

Conservation status
- Least Concern (IUCN 3.1)

Scientific classification
- Kingdom: Animalia
- Phylum: Chordata
- Class: Reptilia
- Order: Squamata
- Suborder: Scinciformata
- Infraorder: Scincomorpha
- Family: Sphenomorphidae
- Genus: Concinnia
- Species: C. brachyosoma

Binomial name
- Concinnia brachyosoma (Lönnberg & Andersson, 1915)

= Concinnia brachyosoma =

Species of lizard

The northern barsided skink (Concinnia brachyosoma) is a species of skink found in Queensland in Australia.
