= Rodondo Island =

Island in Tasmania, Australia

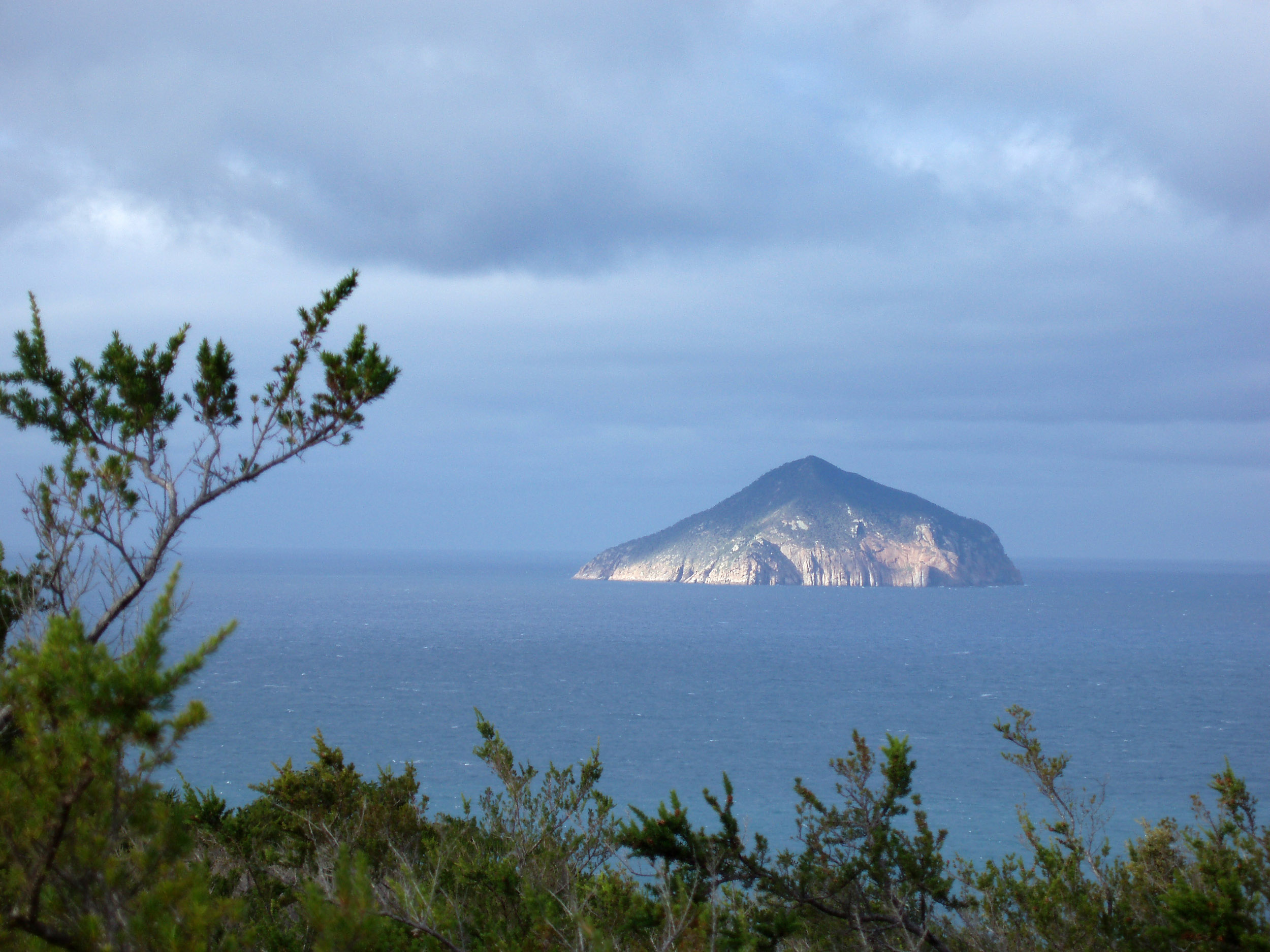
- Rodondo Island from South Point, 10 km distant

- Location within Tasmania
- Etymology: Redonda

Geography
- Location: Bass Strait
- Coordinates: 39°13′48″S 146°23′15″E
- Area: 1.06 km^{2} (0.41 sq mi)
- Highest elevation: 350 m (1150 ft)

Administration
- Australia
- State: Tasmania

Rodondo Island is a granite island, part of the Rodondo Group, lying in northern Bass Strait, within the state boundaries of Tasmania, Australia. The island is located only 10 kilometres (6.2 mi) south of Wilsons Promontory in Victoria, and 2' of latitude (2 nautical miles (3.7 km)) south of the Victoria-Tasmania border at latitude 39°12'S. Rodondo Island is ringed by steep cliffs up to 200 metres (660 ft) high, with an area of 106 hectares (260 acres) and a maximum elevation of 350 metres (1,150 ft) above sea level.

== Flora and fauna ==
It is a nature reserve with a breeding colony of over one million mutton birds or short-tailed shearwaters.

Rodondo's vegetation communities include Disphyma herbfield, Stipa tussock grassland, Poa poiformis tussock grassland, Melaleuca armillaris low closed forest, Allocasuarina verticillata low open forest, clifftop shrubland, and Eucalyptus globulus open forest.

As well as the shearwaters, recorded breeding seabird and wader species include little penguin, fairy prion, Pacific gull and sooty oystercatcher. White-bellied sea-eagles have nested on the island. The island is part of the Wilsons Promontory Islands Important Bird Area, identified as such by BirdLife International because of its importance for breeding seabirds. Reptiles present include the metallic skink, White's skink and southern water skink, Rodondo being the only place the latter has been recorded on Tasmanian territory.

== History ==
The island was sighted by Lieutenant James Grant on 9 December 1800 from the survey brig HMS Lady Nelson and named "from its resemblance to that rock, well known to all seamen in the West Indies", presumably Redonda, between the islands of Montserrat and Nevis.

The first landing was in January 1947 when a party led by John Béchervaise spent a week exploring the island and surveying its natural history.

== See also ==
- List of islands of Tasmania
