= Calyptotis scutirostrum =

Conservation status
- Least Concern (IUCN 3.1)

Scientific classification
- Kingdom: Animalia
- Phylum: Chordata
- Class: Reptilia
- Order: Squamata
- Suborder: Scinciformata
- Infraorder: Scincomorpha
- Family: Sphenomorphidae
- Genus: Calyptotis
- Species: C. scutirostrum

Binomial name
- Calyptotis scutirostrum (Peters, 1874)

Species of lizard

The scute-snouted calyptotis (Calyptotis scutirostrum) is a species of skink found in New South Wales and Queensland in Australia.
