= Ophioscincus cooloolensis =

Conservation status
- Least Concern (IUCN 3.1)

Scientific classification
- Kingdom: Animalia
- Phylum: Chordata
- Class: Reptilia
- Order: Squamata
- Suborder: Scinciformata
- Infraorder: Scincomorpha
- Family: Sphenomorphidae
- Genus: Ophioscincus
- Species: O. cooloolensis

Binomial name
- Ophioscincus cooloolensis Greer & Cogger, 1985

Species of lizard

The Cooloola snake-skink (Ophioscincus cooloolensis) is a species of skink found in Queensland in Australia.
