= Ophioscincus ophioscincus =

Conservation status
- Least Concern (IUCN 3.1)

Scientific classification
- Kingdom: Animalia
- Phylum: Chordata
- Class: Reptilia
- Order: Squamata
- Suborder: Scinciformata
- Infraorder: Scincomorpha
- Family: Sphenomorphidae
- Genus: Ophioscincus
- Species: O. ophioscincus

Binomial name
- Ophioscincus ophioscincus Boulenger, 1887

Species of lizard

The yolk-bellied snake-skink (Ophioscincus ophioscincus) is a species of skink found in Queensland in Australia.
