= Gastrotheca microdiscus =

Conservation status
- Least Concern (IUCN 3.1)

Scientific classification
- Kingdom: Animalia
- Phylum: Chordata
- Class: Amphibia
- Order: Anura
- Family: Hemiphractidae
- Genus: Gastrotheca
- Species: G. microdiscus

Binomial name
- Gastrotheca microdiscus (Andersson, 1910)

Synonyms
- Nototrema microdiscus Andersson In Lönnberg and Andersson, 1910; Opisthodelphis microdiscum Miranda-Ribeiro, 1926; Gastrotheca microdisca Cochran, 1955 "1954"; Gastrotheca (Opisthodelphys) microdiscus Dubois, 1987 "1986"; Gastrotheca (Australotheca) microdiscus Duellman, 2015; Gastrotheca (Alainia) microdiscus Duellman and Cannatella, 2018; Alainia microdiscus Dubois, Ohler, and Pyron, 2021

Species of amphibian

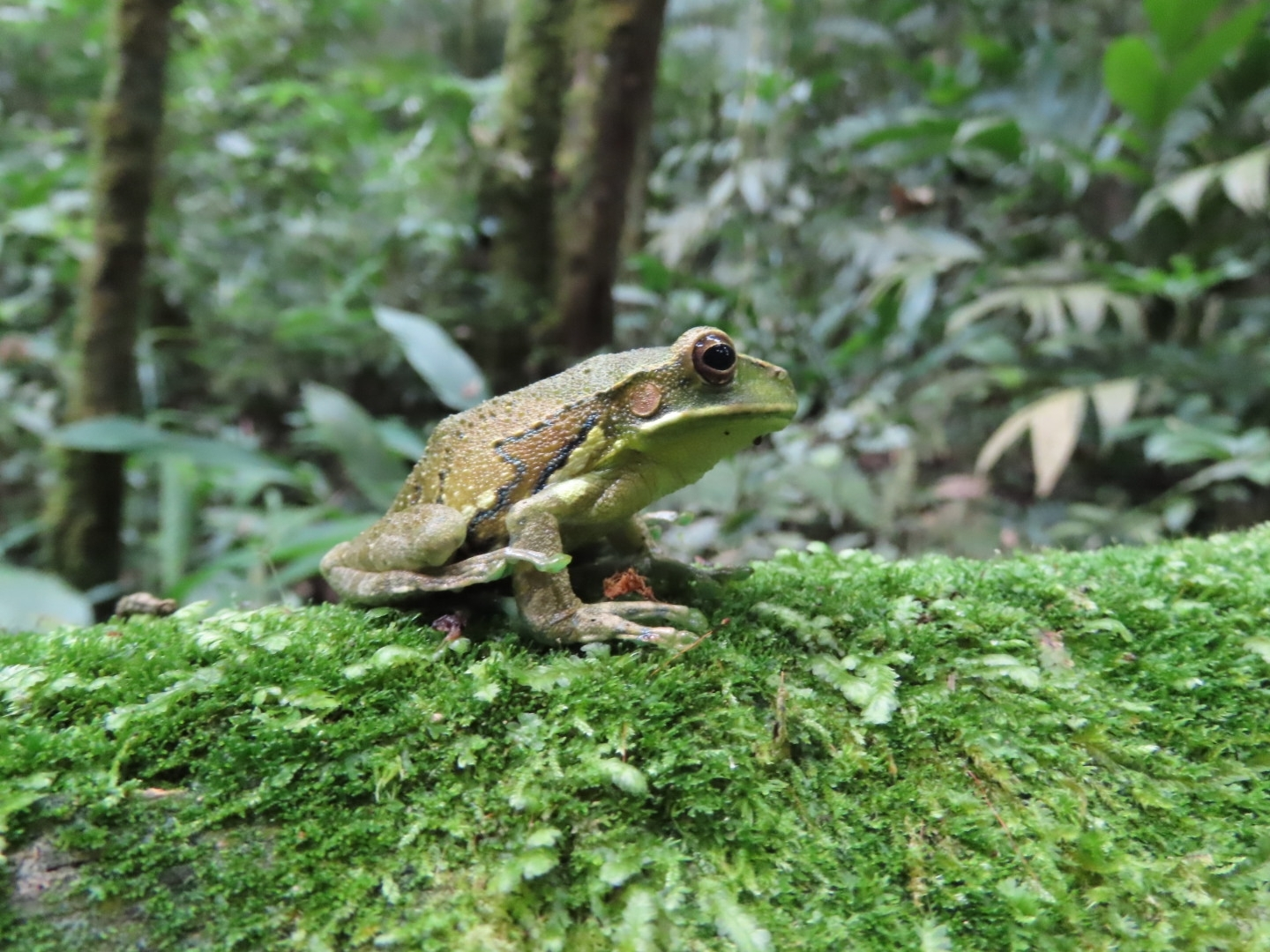
Gastrotheca microdiscus in Brazil

Gastrotheca microdiscus is a frog species in the frog family Hemiphractidae. It is endemic to southeastern Brazil between southern São Paulo and Santa Catarina states.

== Habitat ==
This canopy-dwelling arboreal frog lives only in primary forest with significant numbers of bromeliads, with which the frogs associate. The frog has been reported between 800 and 1,500 m (2,600 and 4,900 ft) above sea level and has been reported in formally protected areas.

== Reproduction ==
The female frog carries her eggs in a pouch on her back. The eggs hatch into small froglets, which develop in bromeliad plantss.

== Danger ==
The IUCN classifies this frog as least concern of extinction. What threat it faces comes from habitat loss in favor of agriculture, silviculture, and cattle grazing. Collection of orinmental bromeliads may also affect this frog.
