= Calyptotis lepidorostrum =

Conservation status
- Least Concern (IUCN 3.1)

Scientific classification
- Kingdom: Animalia
- Phylum: Chordata
- Class: Reptilia
- Order: Squamata
- Suborder: Scinciformata
- Infraorder: Scincomorpha
- Family: Sphenomorphidae
- Genus: Calyptotis
- Species: C. lepidorostrum

Binomial name
- Calyptotis lepidorostrum Greer, 1983

Species of lizard

The cone-eared calyptotis (Calyptotis lepidorostrum) is a species of skink found in Queensland in Australia.
