= Papuascincus morokanus =

Conservation status
- Least Concern (IUCN 3.1)

Scientific classification
- Kingdom: Animalia
- Phylum: Chordata
- Class: Reptilia
- Order: Squamata
- Suborder: Scinciformata
- Infraorder: Scincomorpha
- Family: Sphenomorphidae
- Genus: Papuascincus
- Species: P. morokanus

Binomial name
- Papuascincus morokanus (Parker, 1936)

Species of lizard

Papuascincus morokanus is a species of skink found in Papua New Guinea.
