= Leptoseps =

Scientific classification
- Kingdom: Animalia
- Phylum: Chordata
- Class: Reptilia
- Order: Squamata
- Family: Scincidae
- Subfamily: Sphenomorphinae
- Genus: Leptoseps; Greer, 1997

Genus of lizards

Leptoseps is a genus of rare skinks, lizards in the family Scincidae. The genus is endemic to Southeast Asia.

== Geographic range ==
Species in the genus Leptoseps are found in Thailand and Vietnam.

== Species ==
The following two species are recognized as being valid.

- Leptoseps osellai (Böhme, 1981) – Osella's skink (Thailand)
- Leptoseps poilani (Bourret, 1937) – (Vietnam)
