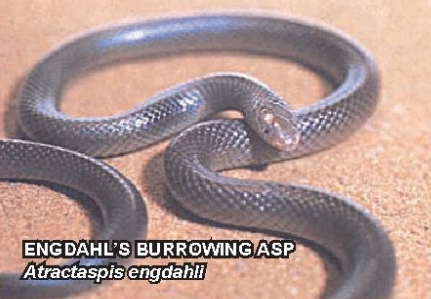

Conservation status
- Least Concern (IUCN 3.1)

Scientific classification
- Kingdom: Animalia
- Phylum: Chordata
- Class: Reptilia
- Order: Squamata
- Suborder: Serpentes
- Family: Atractaspididae
- Genus: Atractaspis
- Species: A. engdahli

Binomial name
- Atractaspis engdahli Lönnberg & Andersson, 1913

= Atractaspis engdahli =

Species of snake

Atractaspis engdahli, also known commonly as Engdahl's burrowing asp, Engdahl's burrowing viper, and the mole viper, is a species of venomous snake in the family Atractaspididae. The species is endemic to Africa.

== Etymology ==
The specific name, engdahli, is in honor of Swedish missionary Theodor Engdahl, who collected the holotype.

== Geographic range ==
A. engdahli is found in north-eastern Kenya and in Somalia.

== Habitat ==
The preferred natural habitats of A. engdahli are savanna, shrubland, and grassland, at altitudes from sea level to 500 m (1,600 ft).

== Behaviour ==
A. engdahli is terrestrial and nocturnal. It is often found in termite nests and in holes in the ground.

== Reproduction ==
A. engdahli is oviparous.
