= Calyptotis =

Scientific classification
- Domain: Eukaryota
- Kingdom: Animalia
- Phylum: Chordata
- Class: Reptilia
- Order: Squamata
- Family: Scincidae
- Subfamily: Sphenomorphinae
- Genus: Calyptotis; De Vis, 1886

Genus of lizards

Calyptotis is a genus of skinks, a type of lizard, found in Australia.

== Species ==
The following four species are recognized as being valid.

- Calyptotis lepidorostrum (Greer, 1983) – cone-eared calyptotis
- Calyptotis ruficauda (Greer, 1983) – red-tailed calyptotis
- Calyptotis scutirostrum (Peters, 1873) – scute-snouted calyptotis
- Calyptotis temporalis (Greer, 1983) – broad-templed calyptotis
