= Papuascincus phaeodes =

Conservation status
- Data Deficient (IUCN 3.1)

Scientific classification
- Kingdom: Animalia
- Phylum: Chordata
- Class: Reptilia
- Order: Squamata
- Suborder: Scinciformata
- Infraorder: Scincomorpha
- Family: Sphenomorphidae
- Genus: Papuascincus
- Species: P. phaeodes

Binomial name
- Papuascincus phaeodes (Vogt, 1932)

Species of lizard

Papuascincus phaeodes is a species of skink found in Papua New Guinea and Indonesia.
