= Anomalopus leuckartii =

Conservation status
- Least Concern (IUCN 3.1)

Scientific classification
- Kingdom: Animalia
- Phylum: Chordata
- Class: Reptilia
- Order: Squamata
- Family: Scincidae
- Genus: Anomalopus
- Species: A. leuckartii

Binomial name
- Anomalopus leuckartii (Weinland, 1862)

Synonyms
- Brachymeles leuckartii Weinland, 1862; Lygosoma leuckartii (Weinland, 1862)

Species of lizard

Anomalopus leuckartii, also known commonly as Leuckart's burrowing skink and the two-clawed worm-skink, is a species of lizard in the subfamily Sphenomorphinae of the family Scincidae. The species is native to eastern Australia.

== Etymology ==
The specific name, leuckartii, is in honor of German zoologist Karl Georg Friedrich Rudolf Leuckart.

== Description ==
A. leuckartii has very small front legs. Each front leg has two toes, each of which has a claw. The rear legs are even smaller, each a mere clawless stub. Adults have a snout-to-vent length (SVL) of about 13.5 cm (5.3 in).

== Geographic range ==
A. leuckhartii is found in the Australian states of New South Wales and Queensland.

== Habitat ==
The preferred natural habitat of A. leuckartii is forest, but it has also been found in gardens.

== Behaviour ==
A. leuckartii is terrestrial and fossorial.

== Reproduction ==
A. leuckartii is oviparous.
