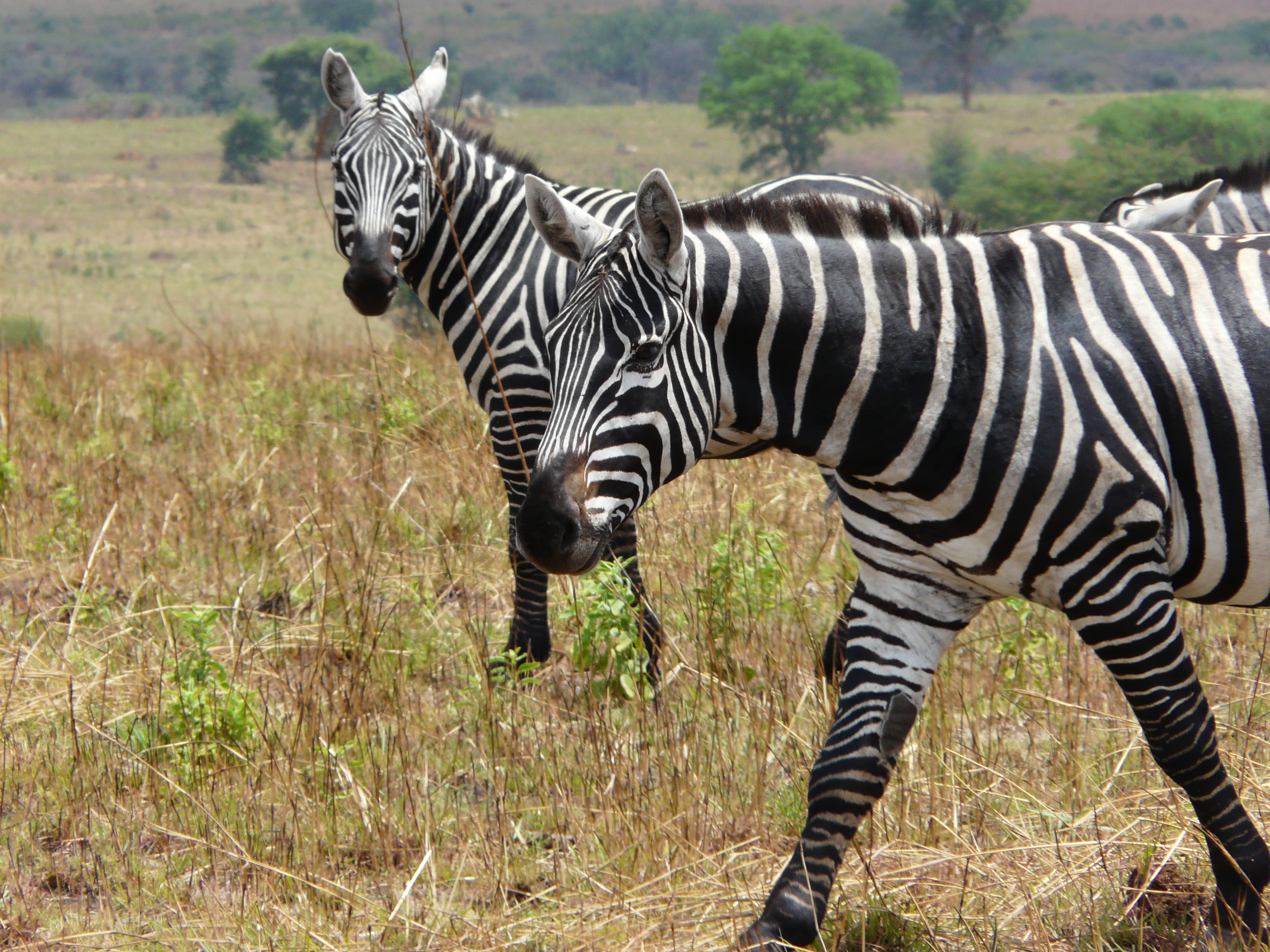
- Maneless zebras at Kidepo Valley National Park in Uganda

Scientific classification
- Kingdom: Animalia
- Phylum: Chordata
- Class: Mammalia
- Order: Perissodactyla
- Family: Equidae
- Genus: Equus
- Species: E. quagga
- Subspecies: E. q. borensis

Trinomial name
- Equus quagga borensis Lönnberg, 1921
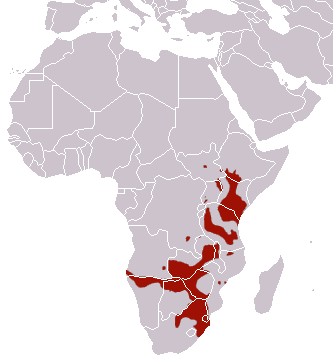

= Maneless zebra =

Subspecies of zebra

The half-maned or maneless zebra (Equus quagga borensis) is a subspecies of the plains zebra characterized by a tufty or absent mane in adult males, but otherwise resembling the Grant’s zebra. It is the northernmost subspecies of the plains zebra, ranging from northwestern Kenya (from Uasin Gishu and Lake Baringo) to the Karamoja district of Uganda. It is also found in eastern South Sudan, east of the White Nile (for example, in Boma National Park). The last remaining substantial population is in Kidepo Valley National Park.

== Taxonomy ==
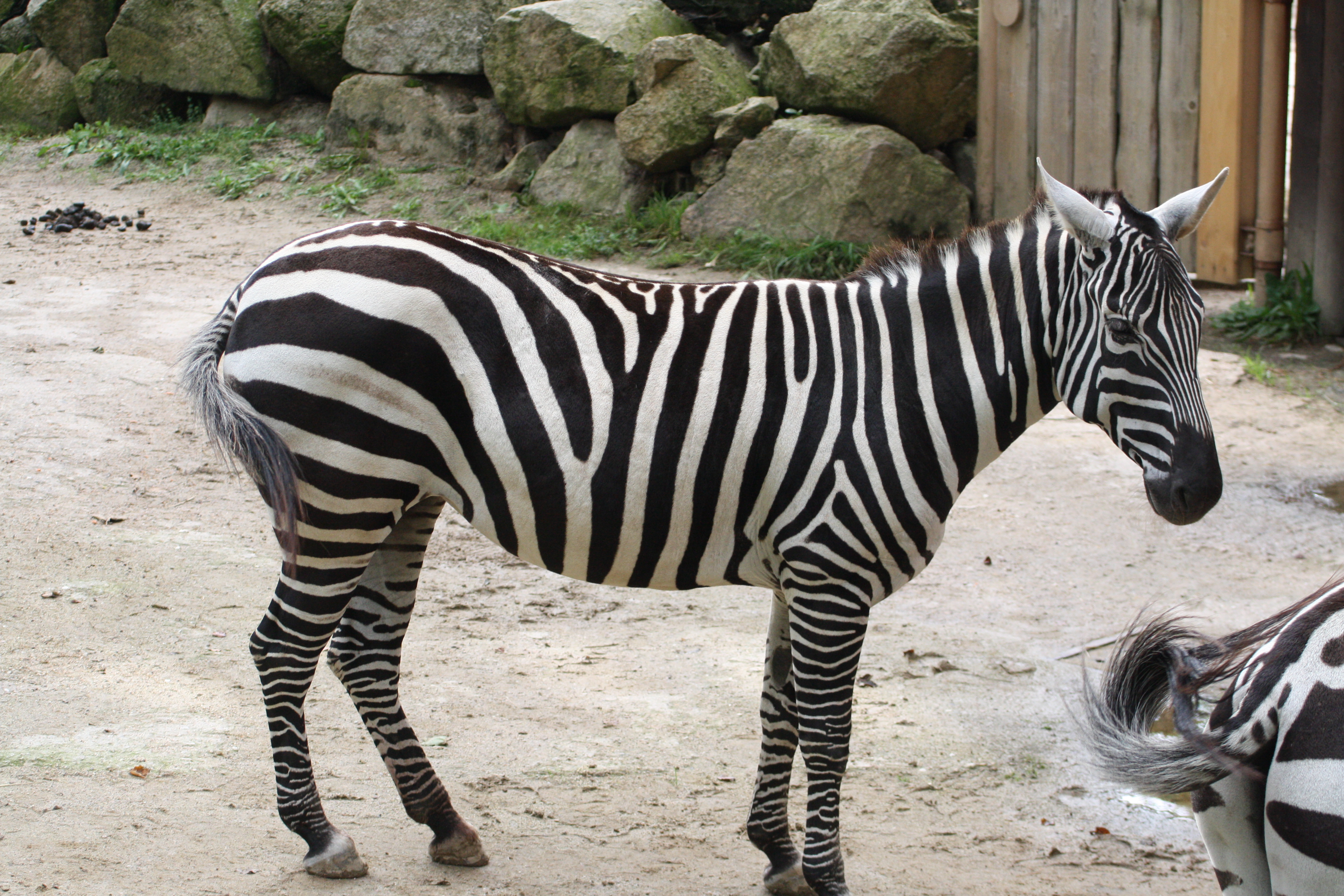
Maneless zebra (Equus quagga borensis) in Liberec Zoo

The maneless zebra was first described in 1921 by the Swedish zoologist Einar Lönnberg. He gave it the name Equus borensis based on a type specimen collected near the town of Bor, South Sudan. Later the maneless zebras have been described by several others. Also in 1954 by Tony Henley, then a ranger in the Game Department of the Protectorate of Uganda based in Moroto and in charge of Karamoja District. Recently, the animals in the Kidepo Valley National Park have been studied by the Kidepo Wildlife Foundation.

Research in 2006 conducted by J. Pluháček, L. Bartoš and J. Vichová, found that out of four plain zebra subspecies, the maneless zebra was the only subspecies that male infanticides were not found.

Testing of mitochondrial DNA in 2008 showed little genetic differentiation in plains zebra, despite the morphological differences described above.
