= Behavioral syndrome =

In behavioral ecology, a behavioral syndrome is a correlated suite of behavioral traits, often (but not always) measured across multiple contexts. The suite of traits that are correlated at the population or species level is considered the behavioral syndrome, while the phenotype of the behavioral syndrome an individual shows is their behavioral type. For example, a population may show a behavioral syndrome that includes a positive correlation between foraging behavior and mating behavior. An individual may be more or less aggressive than another individual within this behavioral syndrome, and this aggressive or passive phenotype is that individual's behavioral type.

For example, the lizards Eulamprus heatwolei show a behavioral syndrome with two behavioral types. There is a correlated relationship between how territorial an individual is, how likely they are to explore their environment, and what strategy they use to avoid predation. This behavioral syndrome has also been shown to influence the mating system of this species; territorial males are more likely to sire offspring with territorial females, and larger territorial males compete less with other males for mates. However, less territorial, or "floater", males and females produce consistently larger offspring than territorial parents or hybrids.

== History ==
Behavioral syndrome is a term that originated in the psychology literature. It was originally used to describe human behavioral disorders, including nervous and stereotypical behaviors. These often included pacing, involuntary muscle twitches, and repetitive self-mutilation.

The term became less popular in the late 1970s and 80s. Through the 90s, it was infrequently used analogously for "personality" in some behavioral ecology literature, but it was still primarily used in psychology literature to describe inter-individual differences in behavior to model systems like rodents and primates.

While a behavioral syndrome is a concept still used in multiple disciplines, the term was adopted by behavioral ecologists and re-defined in 2004. It has become a popular field of study, both empirically and theoretically.

== Evolutionary implications ==
Often, behavior is considered infinitely plastic and can easily be adapted to changing environmental conditions. However, the nature of behavioral syndromes implies that there can be constraints on the behavior of an individual. This can (though it is not required to) lead to the non-optimal behavior that has long been puzzling to behavioral ecologists (e.g., attacking a predator when fleeing is a better option).

Given that behavioral syndromes come with perceived costs, it would be expected for evolution to have selected against them. As such, there are four primary reasons for the persistence of behavioral syndromes: (1) pleiotropy, linkage disequilibrium, or other mechanistic restrictions; (2) the benefit of consistency to mitigate against errors; (3) the benefits of specialization; and (4) the benefits of predictability in social interactions.

It is important to emphasize that while these may mitigate the costs associated with limited behavioral plasticity, behavioral syndromes themselves do not necessarily imply they create sub-optimal behavior. See Misconceptions.

== Mechanisms ==
The field of behavioral syndromes often focuses on describing behavioral types. However, the phenotypic correlations that form behavioral types do not necessarily signify that they have a genetic basis. While behavioral syndromes are theoretically not required to be the byproduct of genetics, understanding if a specific syndrome is genetically based may be important, as this determines heritability. Without a genetic basis, behavioral syndromes must be the result of environmental conditions. Recent studies have shown that some behavioral syndromes have a genetic basis. Additionally, some of these genetic correlations that shape behavioral syndromes can evolve. For example, researchers were able to separate the genetically determined traits of body size, nest size, and foraging behavior in laboratory mice.

The simplest way for a behavioral syndrome to form is through a genetic polymorphism, meaning two or more alleles at the same locus. In one of the best documented examples of this, a single gene (for) controls the foraging distance and a suit of related traits in Drosophila melanogaster. "Rover" individuals forage farther distances as larvae, have an increased activity rates in adulthood and an increased likelihood of encapsulating parasitic wasp eggs. "Sitter" individuals show a relatively decreased response in all of these same categories.

Pleiotropic interactions (where one gene may influence multiple traits) is another likely mechanism. Recently, the proteins transcribed across the whole genome (the transcriptome) of stickleback fish were compared in two different tests: exposed or not exposed to predators. They found that fish exposed to predators showed up- and down-regulation of different genes, compared to those not exposed. Those exposed to predation also developed a behavioral syndrome, while those not exposed to predation did not, suggesting that this change in gene expression may be related to the development of behavioral syndromes.

Non-genetic behavioral syndromes have received almost no focus in recent years, although studies of associated traits that appear to be environmentally determined are not uncommon under other names.

== Misconceptions ==
Though behavioral syndromes were simply intended to be defined as a correlated suite of behavioral traits, some misconceptions are frequent in the literature. Misconceptions include the ideas that behavioral syndromes:

- must be the same from birth to death,
- must be genetically based,
- must always include more than one behavior or more than one context,
- must not be based on physical traits like size or dominance rank, such as being an "alpha" individual,
- must show multiple or discrete behavioral types (rather than a continuum), and
- cause individuals to show sub-optimal behavior.

While all of these things may be associated with behavioral syndromes and may be interesting avenues to study when they are noted, the definition of behavioral syndromes was not meant to imply any of these things to be necessary. The stability, persistence or a minimum requirement of traits are not in part of the definition. At its core, a behavioral syndrome is simply a statistical measure of correlated behavioral traits.
