= Papuascincus =

Scientific classification
- Kingdom: Animalia
- Phylum: Chordata
- Class: Reptilia
- Order: Squamata
- Family: Scincidae
- Subfamily: Sphenomorphinae
- Genus: Papuascincus; Allison & Greer, 1986

Genus of lizards

Papuascincus is a genus of skinks endemic to New Guinea.

== Species ==
The following 4 species are recognized as being valid:

- Papuascincus buergersi (T. Vogt, 1932)
- Papuascincus morokanus (Parker, 1936)
- Papuascincus phaeodes (T. Vogt, 1932)
- Papuascincus stanleyanus (Boulenger, 1897)

Nota bene: A binomial authority in parentheses indicates that the species was originally described in a genus other than Papuascincus.

Papuascincus buergersi (T. Vogt, 1932) is a synonym of Emoia atrocostata (Lesson, 1830).
