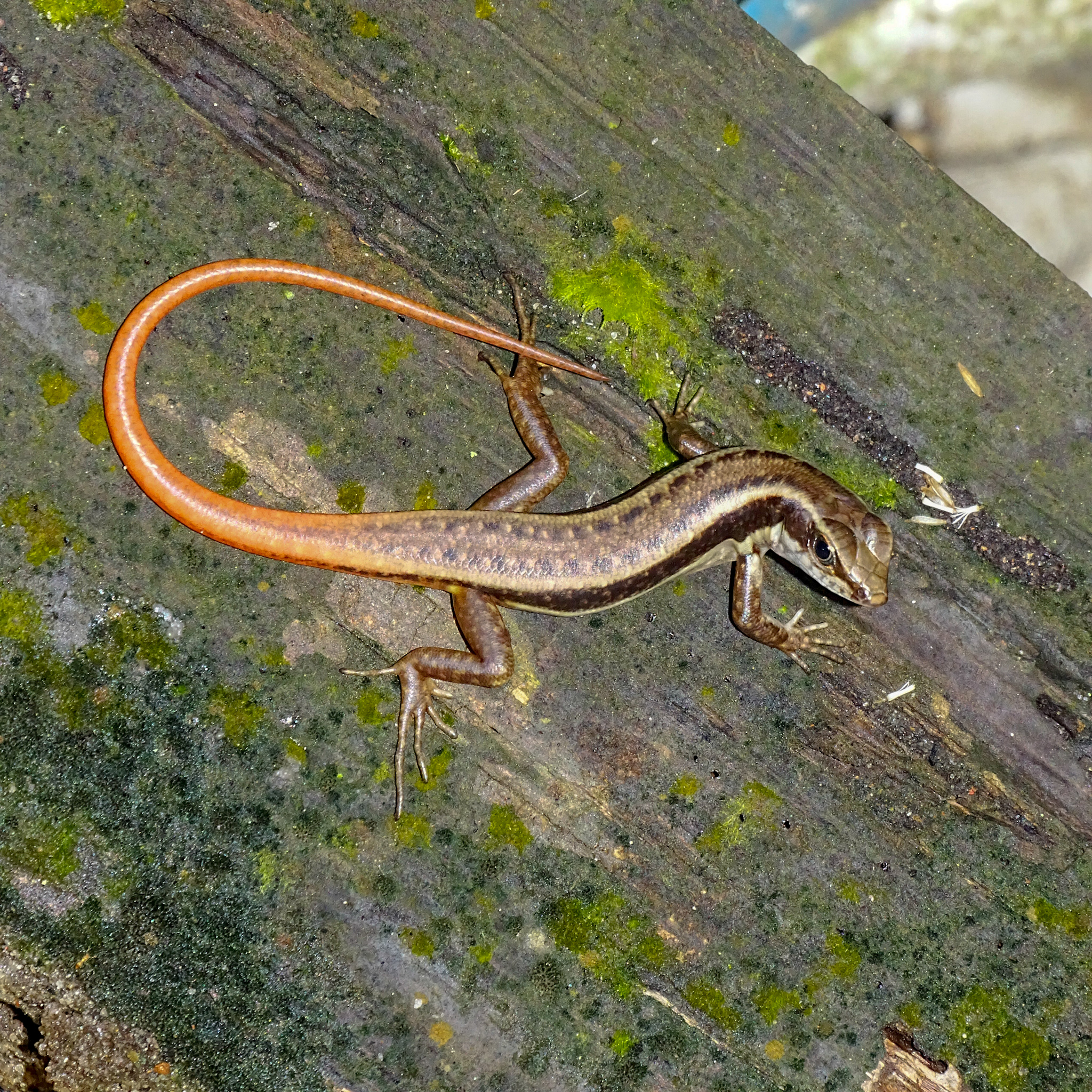
- Sphenomorphus dussumier

Scientific classification
- Kingdom: Animalia
- Phylum: Chordata
- Class: Reptilia
- Order: Squamata
- Family: Scincidae
- Subfamily: Sphenomorphinae

= Sphenomorphinae =

Subfamily of skinks

Sphenomorphinae is a large subfamily of skinks, lizards within the family Scincidae. The genera in this subfamily were previously found to belong to the Sphenomorphus group in the large subfamily Lygosominae.

== Genera ==
The subfamily Sphenomorphinae contains 591 species in 41 genera.

- Anomalopus (4 species)
- Asymblepharus (3 species)
- Calorodius (1 species)
- Calyptotis (4 species)
- Coeranoscincus (2 species)
- Coggeria (1 species)
- Concinnia (7 species)
- Ctenotus (103 species)
- Eremiascincus (15 species)
- Eulamprus (5 species)
- Fojia (1 species)
- Glaphyromorphus (11 species)
- Gnypetoscincus (1 species)
- Hemiergis (7 species)
- Insulasaurus (4 species)
- Isopachys (4 species)
- Kaestlea (5 species)
- Lankascincus (10 species)
- Larutia (9 species)
- Leptoseps (2 species)
- Lerista (97 species)
- Lipinia (28 species)
- Nangura (1 species)
- Notoscincus (2 species)
- Ophioscincus (3 species)
- Ornithuroscincus (9 species)
- Orosaura (1 species)
- Palaia (1 species)
- Papuascincus (4 species)
- Parvoscincus (24 species)
- Pinoyscincus (5 species)
- Praeteropus (4 species)
- Prasinohaema (5 species)
- Ristella (4 species)
- Saiphos (1 species)
- Scincella (38 species)
- Sepsiscus (1 species)
- Silvascincus (2 species)
- Sphenomorphus (113 species)
- Tropidophorus (29 species)
- Tumbunascincus (1 species)
- Tytthoscincus (23 species)
