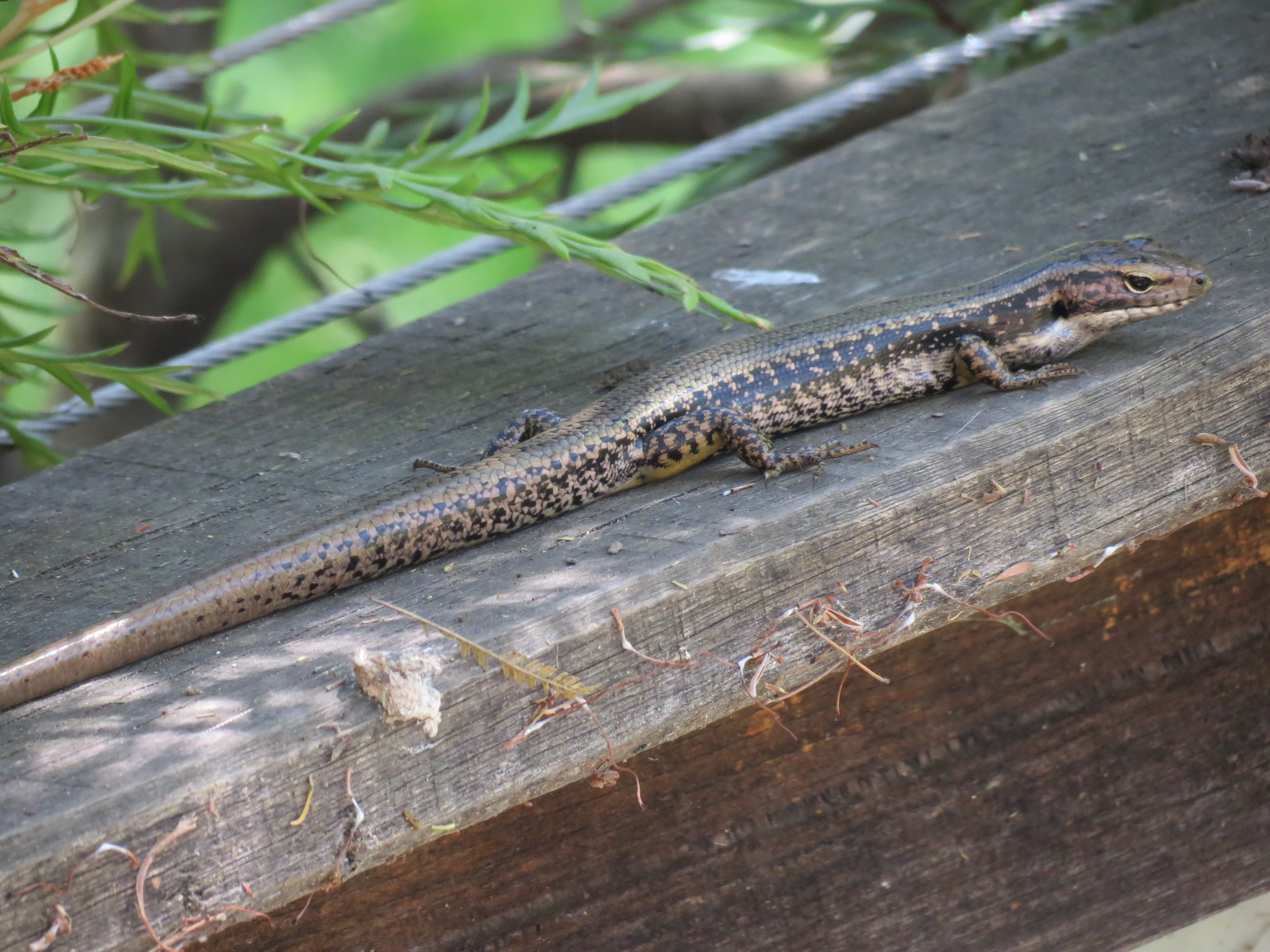

Conservation status
- Least Concern (IUCN 3.1)

Scientific classification
- Kingdom: Animalia
- Phylum: Chordata
- Class: Reptilia
- Order: Squamata
- Suborder: Scinciformata
- Infraorder: Scincomorpha
- Family: Sphenomorphidae
- Genus: Eulamprus
- Species: E. tympanum

Binomial name
- Eulamprus tympanum (Lönnberg & Andersson,1915)

Synonyms
- Sphenomorphus tympanum

= Southern water skink =

Species of lizard

The southern water skink, cool-temperate water-skink, highland water skink, or Dreeite water skink (Eulamprus tympanum) is a medium-sized (maximum snout-vent length c. 100 mm) species of skink that is endemic to Australia. These skinks are found in New South Wales, South Australia, Victoria as well as on Tasmania's Rodondo Island in the Bass Strait. They are viviparous, mating in spring, and giving birth to live young in mid to late summer.

== Description ==
The southern water skink is a medium-sized skink with a snout-to-vent length of up to 85 mm (3.3 in). The head and body are mainly olive-brown, with darker speckles. The flanks are olive-brown with pale speckling.

== Distribution and habitat ==
This species is native to southeastern Australia. It is found in the states of New South Wales, Victoria, the eastern part of Southern Australia and Tasmania, where it only occurs on Rodondo Island. Its habitat is in the vicinity of fresh water and its altitudinal range extends from sea level to near the top of Mount Kosciuszko.

== Ecology ==
The skink usually lives near small creeks, hunting for small prey such as invertebrates, tadpoles, small frogs and other small skinks. Its metabolic rate increases after feeding to about 2.4 times its pre-feeding level, and remains elevated for up to 48 hours. This is probably typical for an active lizard that feeds relatively frequently and is greater than that found in an ambush predatory species.

Reproduction is viviparous, producing live young in mid to late summer. It has been found that the female can select the sex of her offspring by regulating her temperature; she does this by increasing or decreasing the time she spends basking in the sunshine, though what cues are involved in her decision making process are not fully understood. When adult males are scarce, the litters contain more male offspring and when they are plentiful, more female offspring are produced.
