= Anomalopus swansoni =

Conservation status
- Least Concern (IUCN 3.1)

Scientific classification
- Kingdom: Animalia
- Phylum: Chordata
- Class: Reptilia
- Order: Squamata
- Family: Scincidae
- Genus: Anomalopus
- Species: A. swansoni

Binomial name
- Anomalopus swansoni Greer & Cogger, 1985

Species of lizard

Anomalopus swansoni, also known commonly as the punctate worm-skink or Swanson's burrowing skink, is a species of lizard in the family Scincidae. The species is endemic to Australia.

== Etymology ==
The specific name, swansoni, is in honor of Australian herpetologist, Stephen Swanson.

== Geographic range ==
A. swansoni is found between the Hawkesbury River and the Hunter River in eastern New South Wales.

== Description ==
A. swansoni is pinkish-brown on top, with fine dark speckles, and a creamy-pink belly. Unlike other species of Anomalopus, A. swansoni completely lacks limbs.

== Habitat ==
The preferred natural habitats of A. swansoni are supralittoral zone, grassland, shrubland, and forest.

== Behaviour ==
A. swansoni shelters in soil, wood and rocks, and is rarely seen unless disturbed.

== Reproduction ==
A. swansoni is viviparous.
