= Papuascincus buergersi =

Conservation status
- Data Deficient (IUCN 3.1)

Scientific classification
- Kingdom: Animalia
- Phylum: Chordata
- Class: Reptilia
- Order: Squamata
- Family: Scincidae
- Genus: Papuascincus
- Species: P. buergersi

Binomial name
- Papuascincus buergersi (T. Vogt, 1932)

Synonyms
- Lygosoma buergersi T. Vogt, 1932; Emoia buergersi — M.A. Smith, 1937; Lobulia buergersi — Greer, 1974; Papuascincus buergersi — Allison & Greer, 1986

Species of lizard

Papuascincus buergersi is a species of skink, a lizard in the family Scincidae. The species is endemic to Papua New Guinea.

== Etymology ==
The specific name, buergersi, is in honor of German zoologist Theodore Joseph Bürgers (1881–1954).

== Geographic range ==
P. buergersi is found in the Sepik River basin, Papua New Guinea.

== Behavior ==
P. buergersi is terrestrial.

== Reproduction ==
P. buergersi is oviparous.
