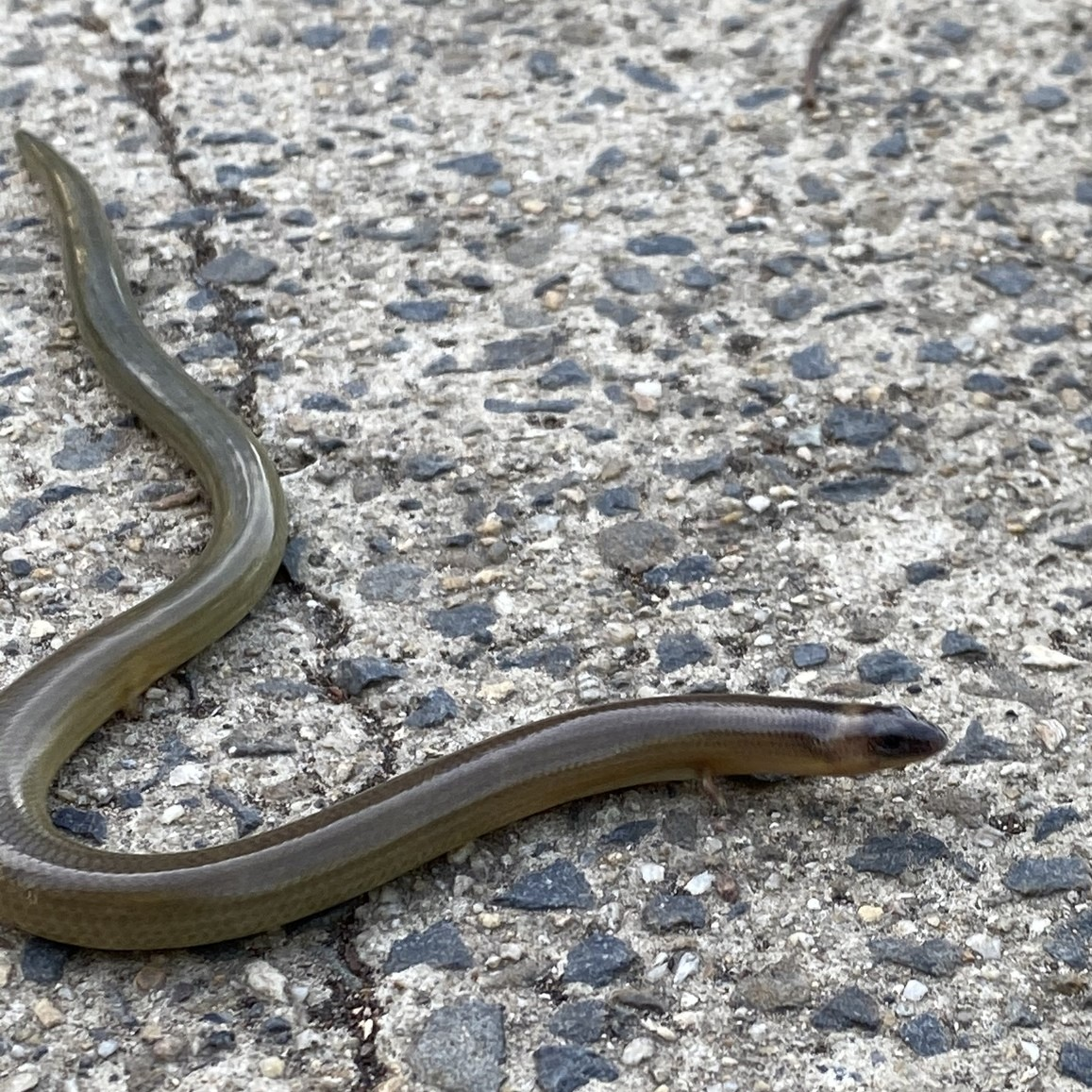

Conservation status
- Least Concern (IUCN 3.1)

Scientific classification
- Kingdom: Animalia
- Phylum: Chordata
- Class: Reptilia
- Order: Squamata
- Family: Scincidae
- Genus: Anomalopus
- Species: A. verreauxii

Binomial name
- Anomalopus verreauxii A.M.C. Duméril & A.H.A. Duméril, 1851

Synonyms
- Anomalopus verreauxii A.M.C. Duméril & A.H.A. Duméril, 1851; Siaphus simplex Cope, 1864; Anomalopus godeffroyi W. Peters, 1867; Chelomeles pseudopus Günther, 1873; Lygosoma verreauxi — M.A. Smith, 1937; Anomalopus verreauxii — Cogger, 1983

= Anomalopus verreauxii =

Species of lizard

Anomalopus verreauxii, also known commonly as the three-clawed worm-skink or Verreaux's skink, is a species of lizard in the family Scincidae. The species is endemic to Australia.

== Etymology ==
The specific name, verreauxii (masculine, genitive, singular), is in honor of one of the Verreaux brothers, Édouard Verreaux and Jules Verreaux, who were French naturalists and taxidermists.

== Geographic range ==
A. verreauxii is found in New South Wales and Queensland, Australia.

== Habitat ==
The preferred natural habitat of A. verreauxii is forest.

== Description ==
A. verreauxii has three clawed toes on the front leg, and it has no toes on the back leg.

== Reproduction ==
A. verreauxii is oviparous.
