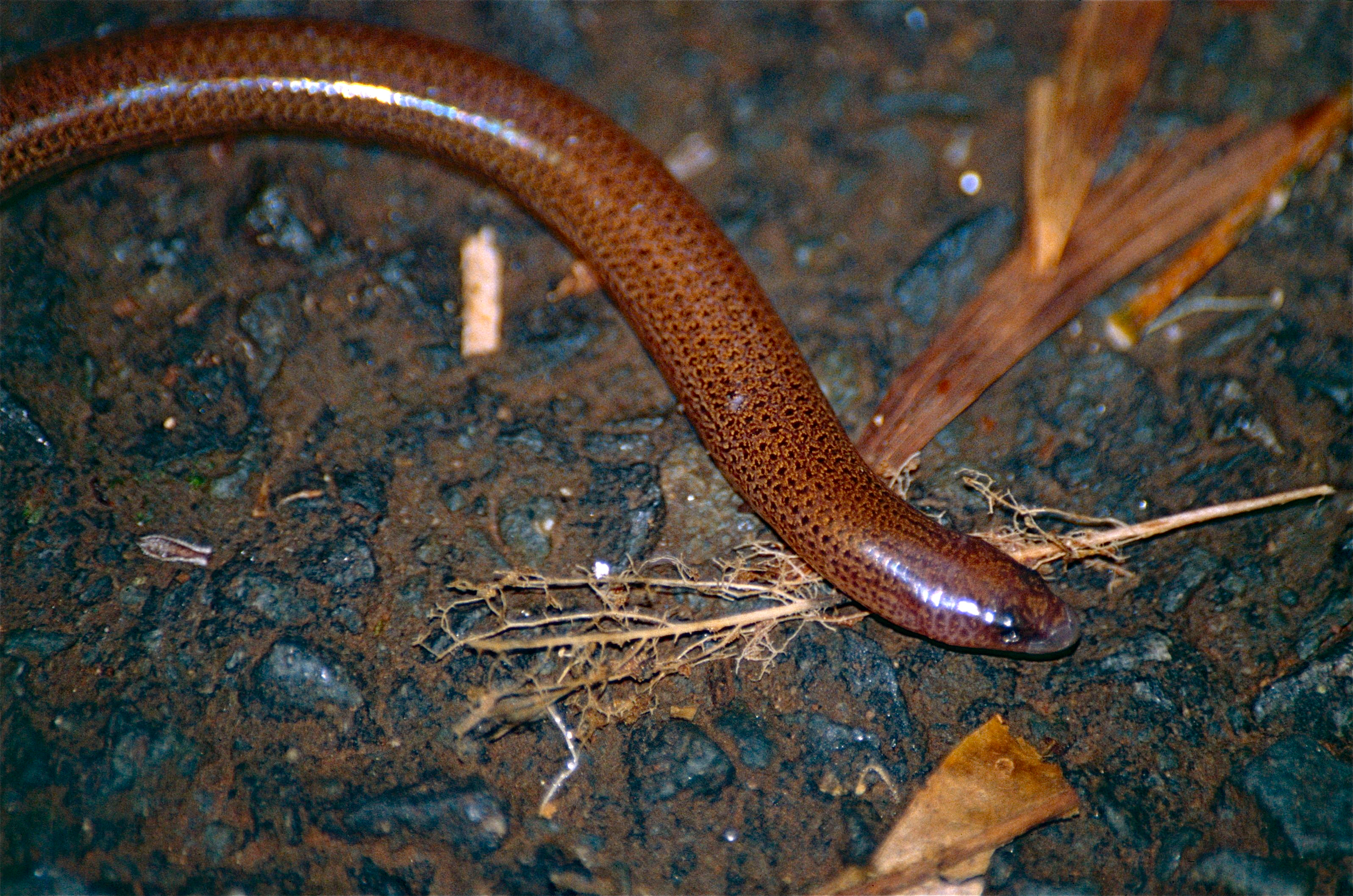

Conservation status
- Least Concern (IUCN 3.1)

Scientific classification
- Kingdom: Animalia
- Phylum: Chordata
- Class: Reptilia
- Order: Squamata
- Family: Scincidae
- Genus: Ophioscincus
- Species: O. truncatus

Binomial name
- Ophioscincus truncatus (Peters, 1876)

= Ophioscincus truncatus =

Species of lizard

Ophioscincus truncatus, the short-limbed snake-skink, is a species of burrowing short-limbed snake-skink that is endemic to the coastal areas and islands of New South Wales and Queensland, in Australia.

== Classification ==
Subspecies

- Ophioscincus truncatus truncatus (Peters 1876)
- Ophioscincus truncatus monswilsonensis (Copland, 1952)
