= Calyptotis temporalis =

Scientific classification
- Domain: Eukaryota
- Kingdom: Animalia
- Phylum: Chordata
- Class: Reptilia
- Order: Squamata
- Family: Scincidae
- Genus: Calyptotis
- Species: C. temporalis

Binomial name
- Calyptotis temporalis Greer, 1983

Species of lizard

The broad-templed calyptotis (Calyptotis temporalis) is a species of skink found in Queensland in Australia.
