= Calyptotis ruficauda =

Conservation status
- Least Concern (IUCN 3.1)

Scientific classification
- Kingdom: Animalia
- Phylum: Chordata
- Class: Reptilia
- Order: Squamata
- Suborder: Scinciformata
- Infraorder: Scincomorpha
- Family: Sphenomorphidae
- Genus: Calyptotis
- Species: C. ruficauda

Binomial name
- Calyptotis ruficauda Greer, 1983

Species of lizard

The red-tailed calyptotis (Calyptotis ruficauda) is a species of skink found in New South Wales in Australia. They are oviparous reptiles, and they are a part of the scincidae family.
