= Leptoseps poilani =

Conservation status
- Data Deficient (IUCN 3.1)

Scientific classification
- Kingdom: Animalia
- Phylum: Chordata
- Class: Reptilia
- Order: Squamata
- Suborder: Scinciformata
- Infraorder: Scincomorpha
- Family: Sphenomorphidae
- Genus: Leptoseps
- Species: L. poilani

Binomial name
- Leptoseps poilani (Bourret, 1937)

Synonyms
- Siaphos poilani Bourret, 1937

Species of lizard

Leptoseps poilani is a species of skink found in Vietnam.

== Taxonomy ==
It was first formally named by René Léon Bourret in 1937 as Siaphos poilani. The specific name poilani is in honor of French botanist Eugène Poilane (1887–1964).
