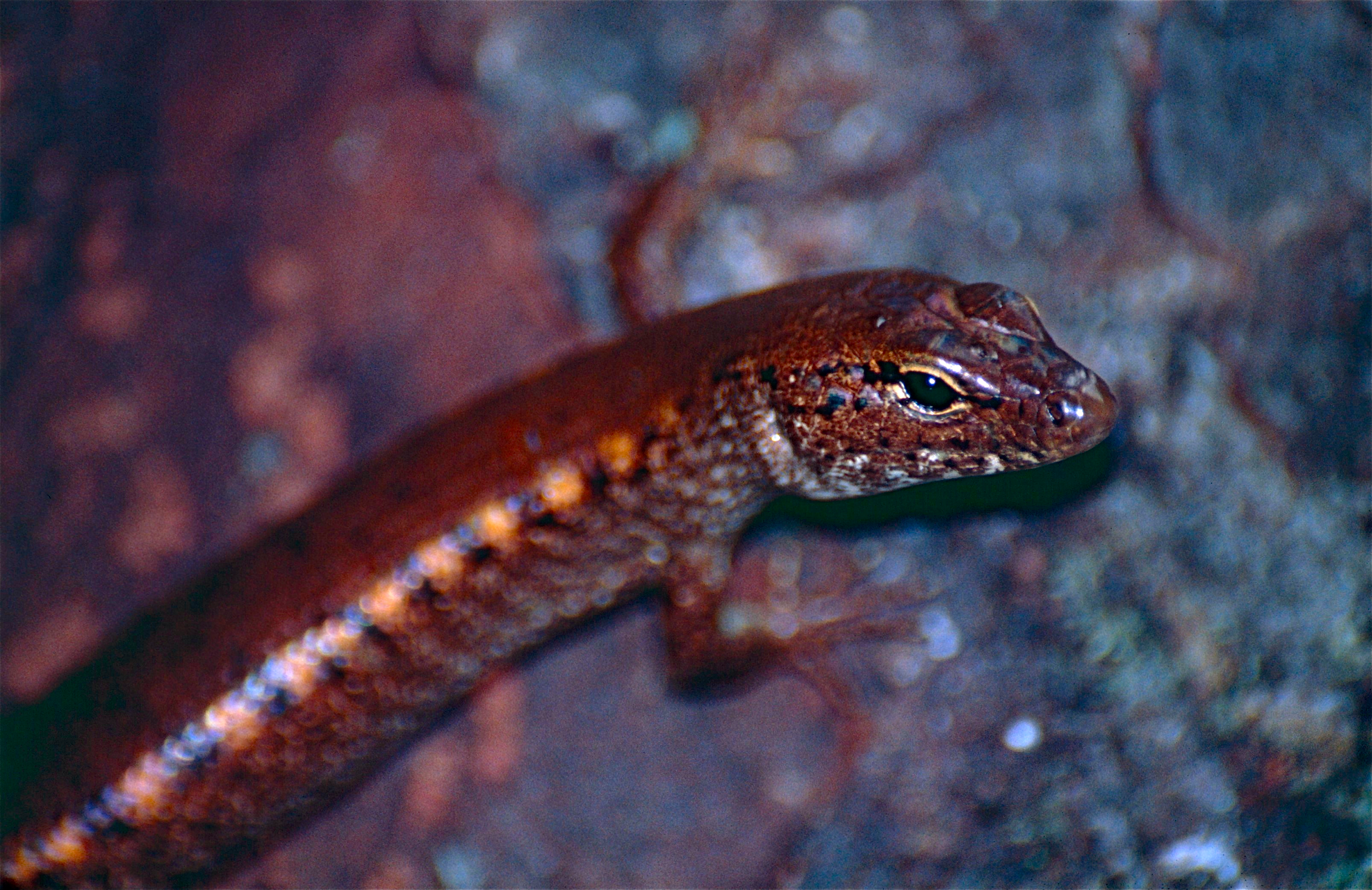

Conservation status
- Least Concern (IUCN 3.1)

Scientific classification
- Kingdom: Animalia
- Phylum: Chordata
- Class: Reptilia
- Order: Squamata
- Suborder: Scinciformata
- Infraorder: Scincomorpha
- Family: Sphenomorphidae
- Genus: Concinnia
- Species: C. tigrina

Binomial name
- Concinnia tigrina (De Vis, 1888)

= Concinnia tigrina =

Species of lizard

The yellow-blotched forest-skink or rainforest water-skink (Concinnia tigrina) is a species of skink found in Queensland in Australia.
