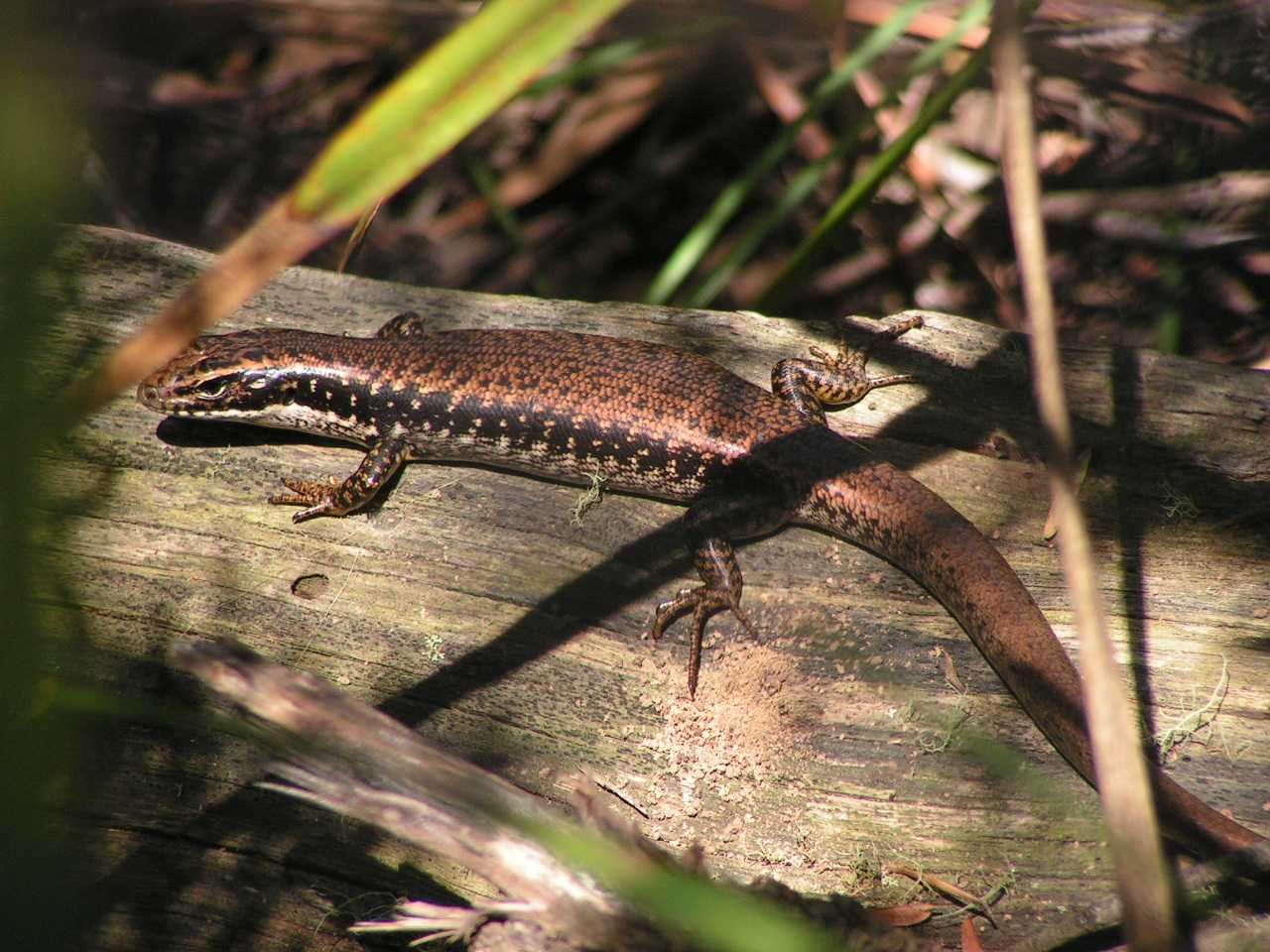

Conservation status
- Least Concern (IUCN 3.1)

Scientific classification
- Kingdom: Animalia
- Phylum: Chordata
- Class: Reptilia
- Order: Squamata
- Suborder: Scinciformata
- Infraorder: Scincomorpha
- Family: Sphenomorphidae
- Genus: Eulamprus
- Species: E. heatwolei

Binomial name
- Eulamprus heatwolei Wells & Wellington, 1983

= Eulamprus heatwolei =

Species of lizard

The warm-temperate water-skink, Heatwole's water skink or yellow-bellied water skink (Eulamprus heatwolei) is a species of skink found in New South Wales and Victoria in Australia. It lives in rocky habitats, preferring those near water such as bogs, swamps, creek and river margins. It can also be found on dry and wet forests, open woodlands and heathlands, commonly seen basking on waterside logs and rocks.
