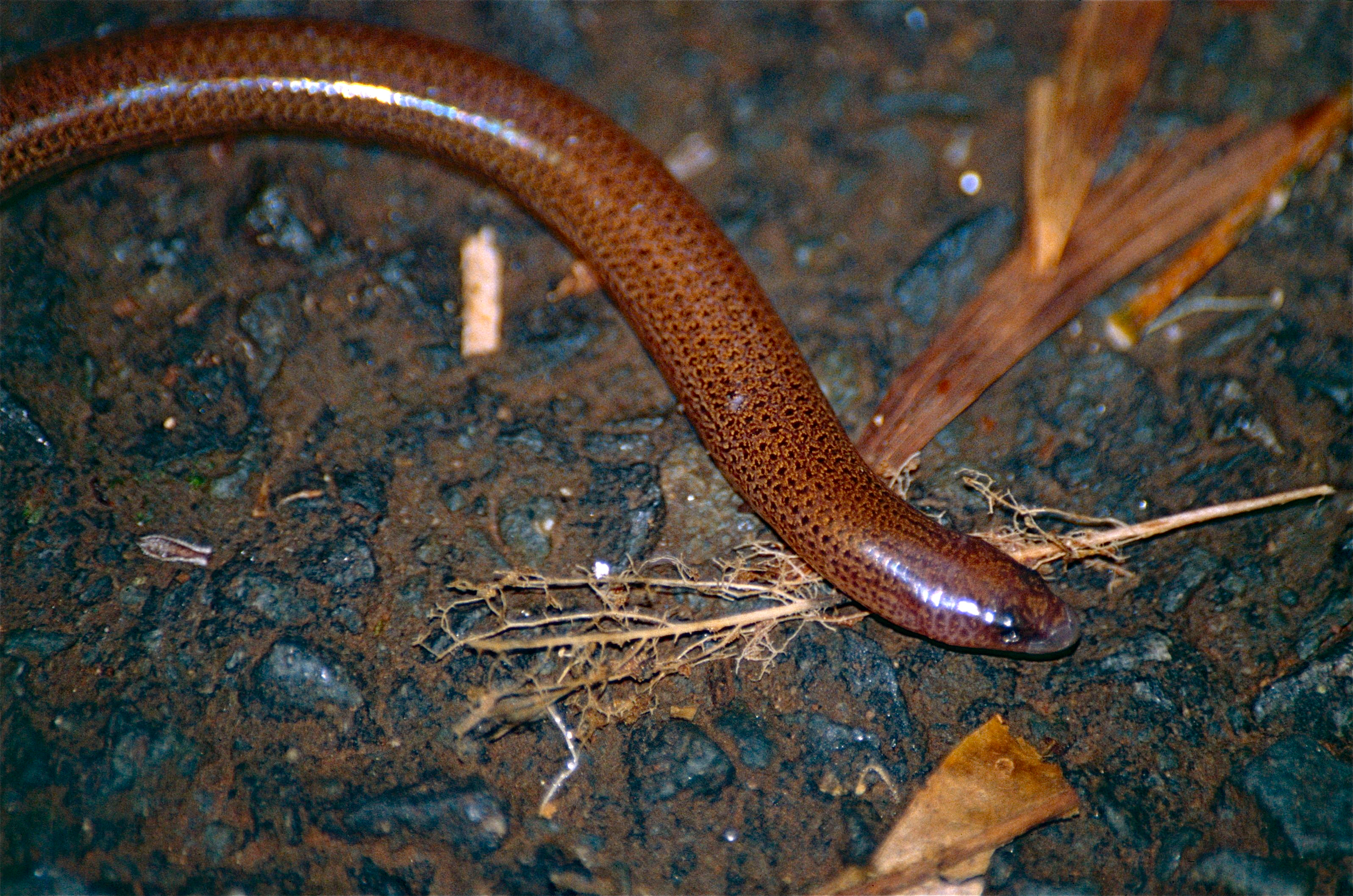
- Short-limbed Snake-skink (Ophioscincus truncatus)

Scientific classification
- Kingdom: Animalia
- Phylum: Chordata
- Class: Reptilia
- Order: Squamata
- Suborder: Scinciformata
- Infraorder: Scincomorpha
- Superfamily: Lygosomoidea
- Family: Sphenomorphidae
- Genus: Ophioscincus; Peters, 1874

= Ophioscincus =

Genus of lizards

Ophioscincus is a genus of skink found in Australia.

== Classification ==
- Ophioscincus cooloolensis Greer & Cogger, 1985 Cooloola snake-skink
- Ophioscincus ophioscincus (Boulenger, 1887) Yolk-bellied snake-skink
- Ophioscincus truncatus (Peters, 1876) Short-limbed snake-skink
