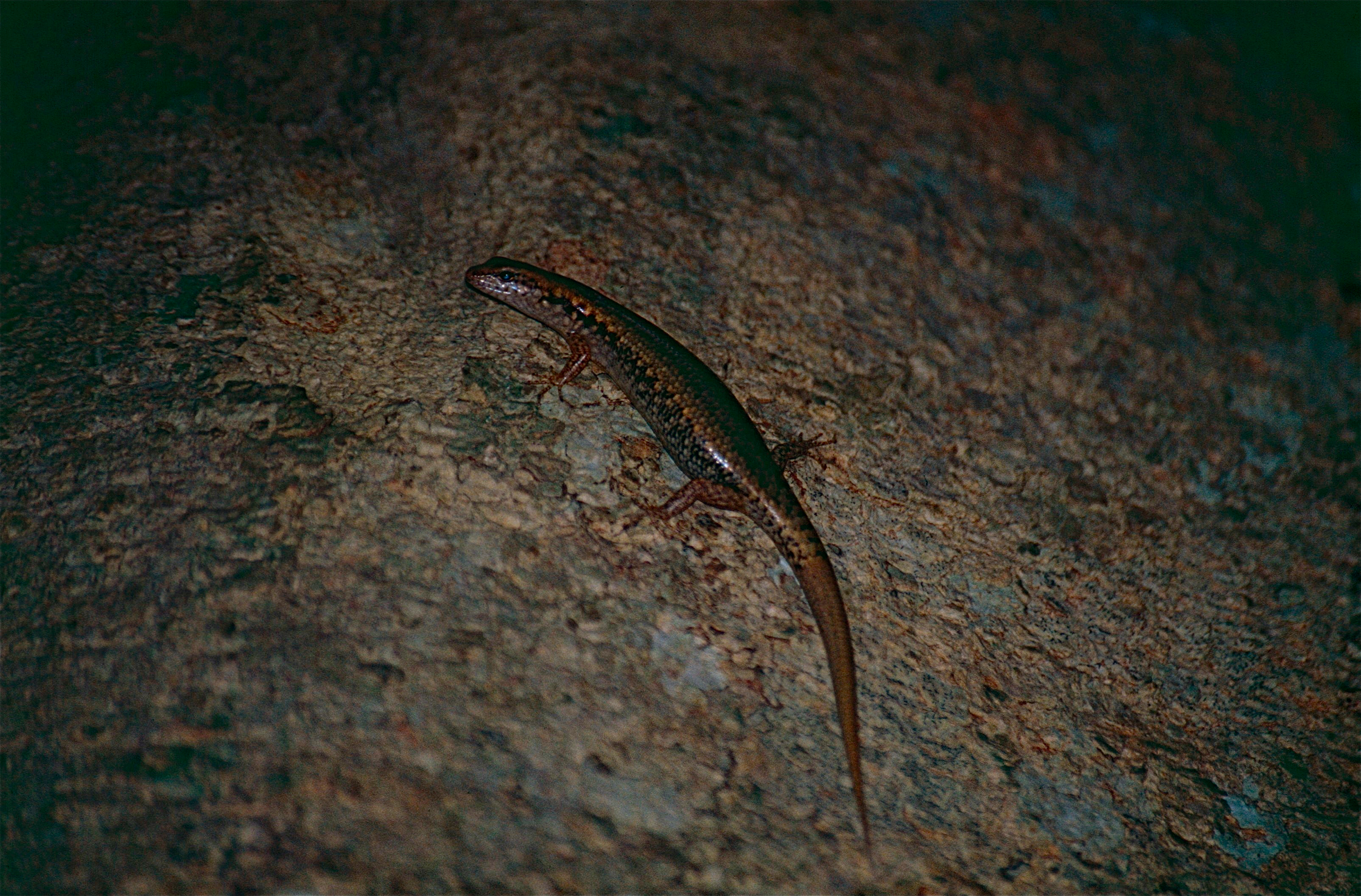

Conservation status
- Least Concern (IUCN 3.1)

Scientific classification
- Kingdom: Animalia
- Phylum: Chordata
- Class: Reptilia
- Order: Squamata
- Suborder: Scinciformata
- Infraorder: Scincomorpha
- Family: Sphenomorphidae
- Genus: Concinnia
- Species: C. tenuis

Binomial name
- Concinnia tenuis (Gray, 1831)

= Concinnia tenuis =

Species of lizard

The bar-sided forest-skink or barred-sided skink (Concinnia tenuis) is a species of skink found in New South Wales and Queensland in Australia.
