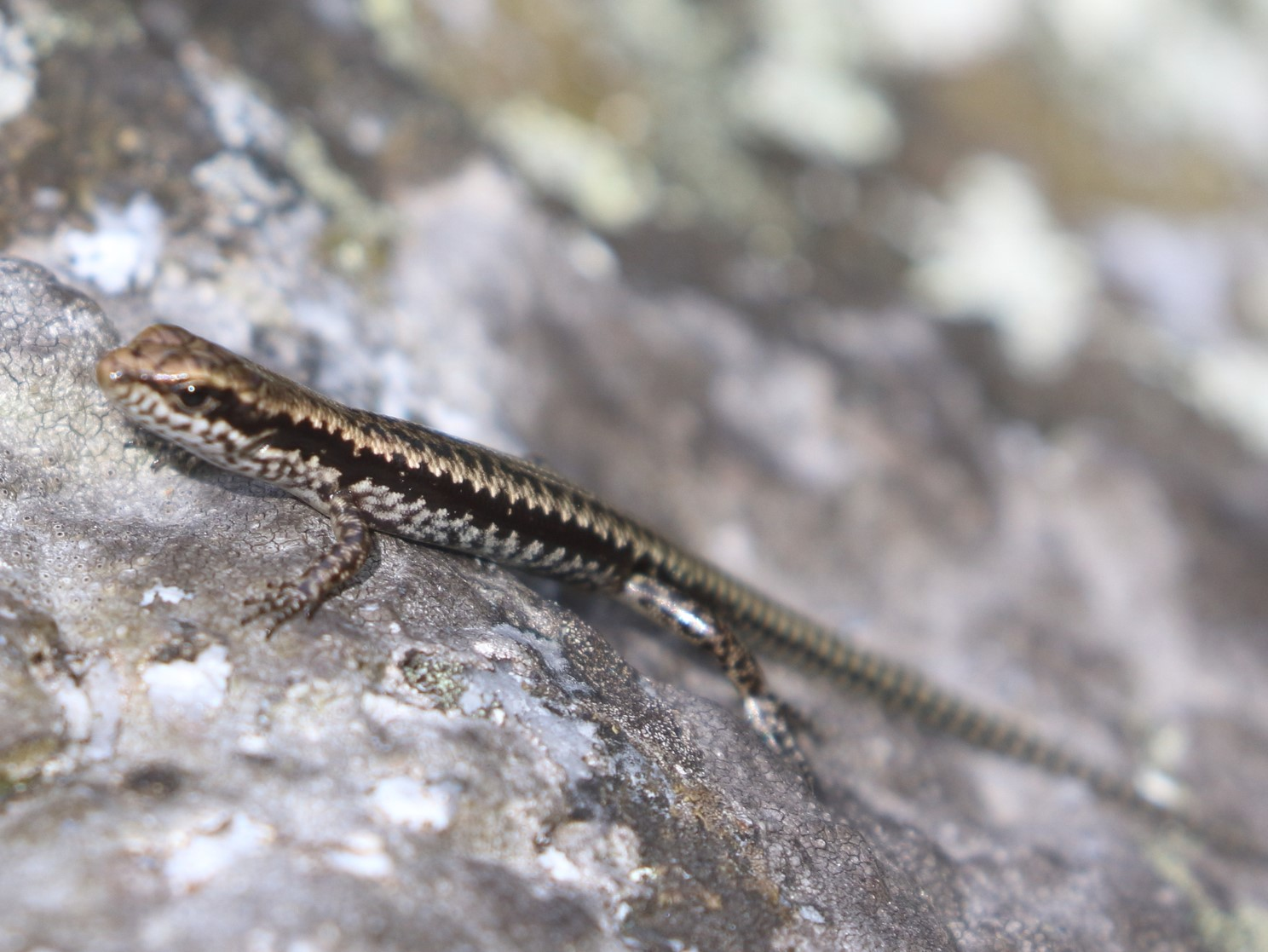

Conservation status
- Least Concern (IUCN 3.1)

Scientific classification
- Kingdom: Animalia
- Phylum: Chordata
- Class: Reptilia
- Order: Squamata
- Suborder: Scinciformata
- Infraorder: Scincomorpha
- Family: Sphenomorphidae
- Genus: Concinnia
- Species: C. martini

Binomial name
- Concinnia martini Wells & Wellington, 1985

= Concinnia martini =

Species of lizard

The dark barsided skink (Concinnia martini) is a species of skink found in Queensland and New South Wales in Australia.
