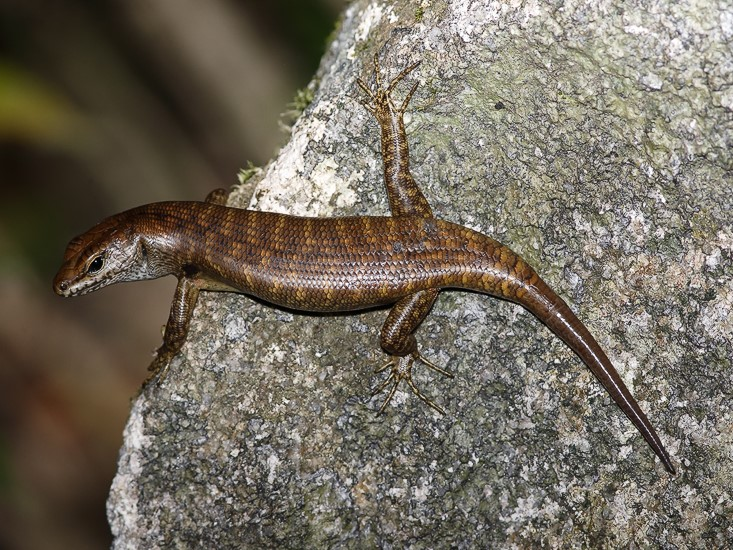

Conservation status
- Least Concern (IUCN 3.1)

Scientific classification
- Kingdom: Animalia
- Phylum: Chordata
- Class: Reptilia
- Order: Squamata
- Family: Scincidae
- Genus: Concinnia
- Species: C. ampla

Binomial name
- Concinnia ampla (Covacevich & McDonald, 1980)

= Concinnia ampla =

Species of lizard

The lemon-barred forest-skink (Concinnia ampla) is a species of skink found in Queensland, Australia. It is commonly found in montane forest or rainforest, among rock outcrops, rocks or tree roots that are associated with streams. The skink is known to sleep on exposed rock faces at night. It is one of the few skinks which produce sounds when captured.
