= Concinnia sokosoma =

Conservation status
- Least Concern (IUCN 3.1)

Scientific classification
- Kingdom: Animalia
- Phylum: Chordata
- Class: Reptilia
- Order: Squamata
- Suborder: Scinciformata
- Infraorder: Scincomorpha
- Family: Sphenomorphidae
- Genus: Concinnia
- Species: C. sokosoma

Binomial name
- Concinnia sokosoma (Greer, 1992)
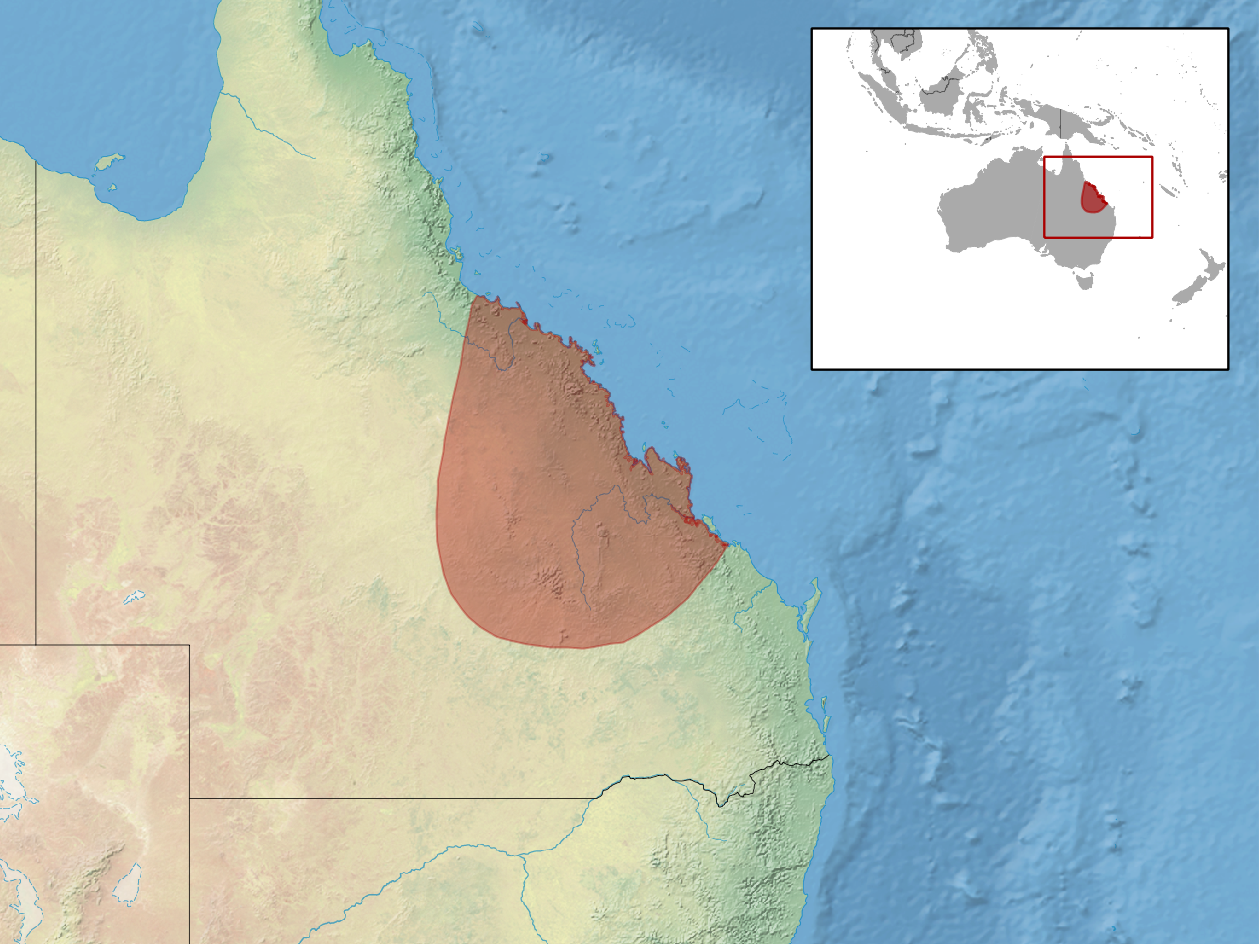

Synonyms
- Eulamprus sokosoma

Species of lizard

The stout barsided skink (Concinnia sokosoma) is a species of skink found in Queensland in Australia.
