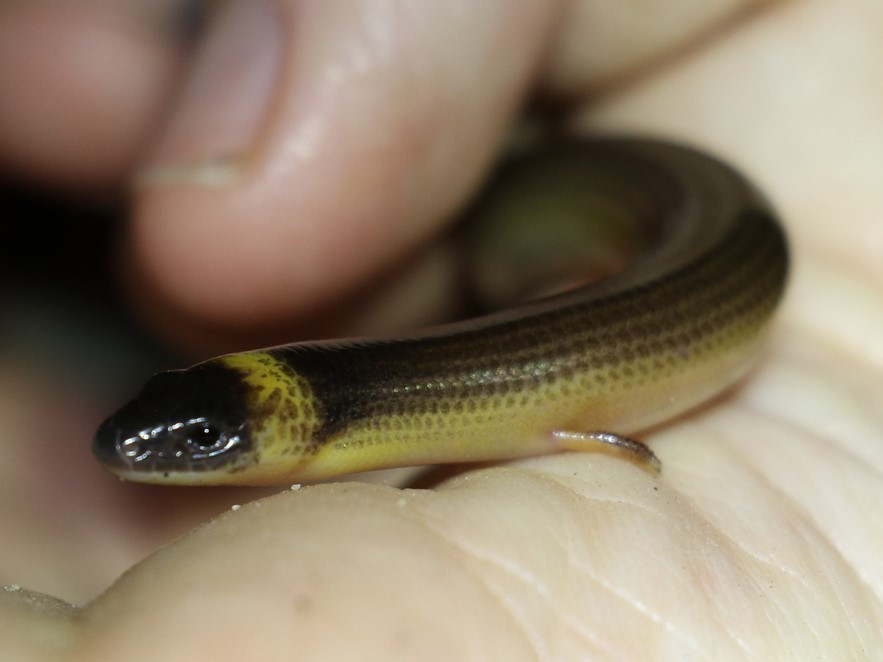
- Anomalopus verreauxii

Scientific classification
- Kingdom: Animalia
- Phylum: Chordata
- Class: Reptilia
- Order: Squamata
- Family: Scincidae
- Subfamily: Sphenomorphinae
- Genus: Anomalopus; A.M.C. Duméril & A.H.A. Duméril, 1851

Species
- Four, see text.

= Anomalopus =

Genus of lizards

Anomalopus is a genus of worm-skinks, smallish smooth-scaled burrowing lizards in the subfamily Sphenomorphinae of the family Scincidae. The genus is endemic to the eastern half of Australia. The genus belongs to a clade in the Sphenomorphus group which contains such genera as Ctenotus and the close relatives Eulamprus and Gnypetoscincus (Austin & Arnold 2006).

== Species ==
The following species are recognized as being valid.

- Anomalopus leuckartii (Weinland, 1862) – two-clawed worm-skink (eastern Australia)
- Anomalopus mackayi Greer & Cogger, 1985 – five-clawed worm-skink (eastern Australia)
- Anomalopus swansoni Greer & Cogger, 1985 – punctate worm-skink (eastern coastal Australia)
- Anomalopus verreauxii A.M.C. Dumeril & A.H.A. Dumeril, 1851 – three-clawed worm-skink

Nota bene: A binomial authority in parentheses indicates that the species was originally described in a genus other than Anomalopus.
