= Einar Lönnberg =

Swedish zoologist and conservationist

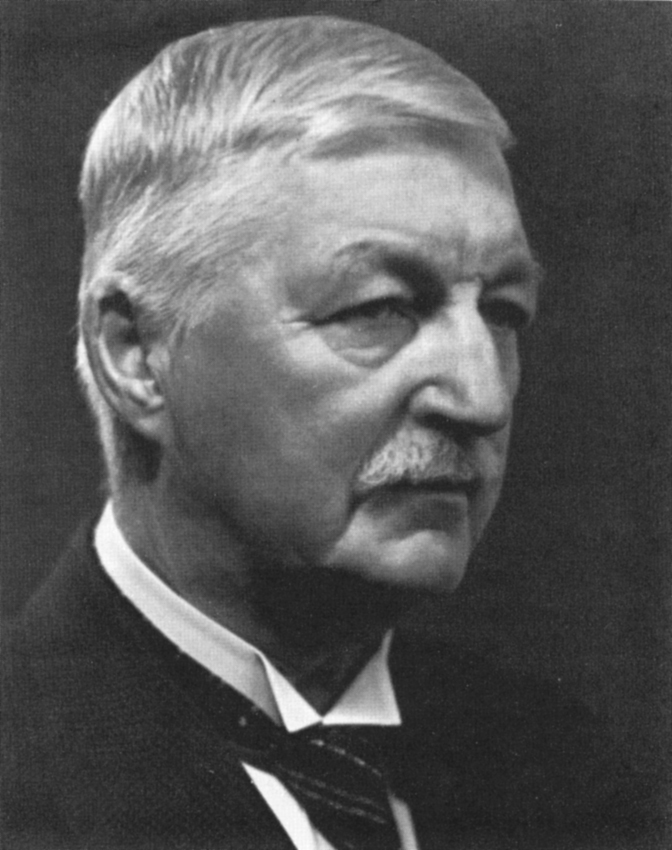
- Born: 24 December 1865
- Died: 21 November 1942 (aged 76)

Axel Johann Einar Lönnberg (24 December 1865 – 21 November 1942) was a Swedish zoologist and conservationist. Lönnberg was born in Stockholm. He was head of the Vertebrate Department of the Naturhistoriska Riksmuseet (Swedish Natural History Museum) from 1904 to 1933.

In 1891 he obtained his PhD from the University of Uppsala, spending the next twelve years as an inspector in the fisheries service. During this time-frame he made scientific trips to Florida (1892 – 1893) and the Caspian Sea (1899). In 1904 he was appointed head of the department of vertebrates at the Naturhistoriska Riksmuseet in Stockholm. In 1910 – 1911 he participated in an expedition to East Africa. From 1925 to 1942 he served as prefect of the Kristineberg Marina Forskningsstation (Kristineberg Marine Zoological Station).

In regard to his zoological research, his primary focus dealt with mammals, birds and fish, but he also made significant contributions in his studies of reptiles and amphibians. He was the binomial authority of numerous taxa, and has several species named after him, such as Onykia loennbergii (Japanese hooked squid) and a subspecies of the Brown Skua. The Belgian-British zoologist George Albert Boulenger named a small, secretive, venomous, endemic New Guinea elapid snake Apisthocalamus loennbergii in his honour, although this species is now synonymised with Toxicocalamus loriae (Loria's forest snake). In his obituary in the ornithological journal, Ibis, it was written: "that since the days of Linnaeus hardly anyone has known so much about so many branches of zoology as Lönnberg".

In 1904 he founded the influential journal of biology, Fauna och Flora. As a conservationist he campaigned for laws protecting waterfowl and reindeer. In 1922 he became an honorary member of the British Ornithologists' Union.

== Some species that Lönnberg described ==
Reptiles

- Tupinambis duseni now Salvator duseni 1910 (yellow tegu)
- Isopachys gyldenstolpei 1916 (Gyldenstolpe's snake skink)
- Mabuya irregularis now Trachylepis irregularis 1922 (alpine meadow skink)

Mammals (subspecies)

- Equus quagga borensis 1921 (Maneless zebra)
- Orycteropus afer erikssoni 1906 (North Congo aardvark)

Fish

- Artedidraco mirus 1905 (South Georgian plunderfish)

Co-authored with Lars Gabriel Andersson

- Aipysurus tenuis 1913 (Arafura seasnake)
- Atractaspis engdahli 1913 (Engdahl's burrowing asp)
- Lygosoma graciloides now Eroticoscincus graciloides 1913 (elf skink)
- Oedurella taeniata now Strophurus taeniatus 1913 (phasmid striped gecko)
- Lygosoma brachyosoma now Concinnia brachyosoma 1915 (northern bar-sided skink)
- Lygosoma tympanum now Eulamprus tympanum 1915 (highland water skink)
- Lygosoma mjobergi now Glaphyromorphus mjobergi 1915 (Atherton Tableland skink)

== Written works by Lönnberg that have been published in English ==
- "Linnean type-specimens of birds, reptiles, batrachians, and fishes in the Zoological Museum of the Royal University of Upsala", 1896
- "Is the Florida box tortoise a distinct species", 1897
- "Reptiles and batrachians collected in German New Guinea by the late Dr Erik Nyman", 1900
- "Peter Artedi : a bicentenary memoir : written on behalf of the Swedish Royal Academy of Science", 1905
- "Contributions to the fauna of South Georgia, 1906
- "Mammals", 1908
- "A new lizard and a new frog from Paraná", 1910 (co-author L. G. Andersson)
- "Birds collected by the Swedish Zoological Expedition to British East Africa 1911", 1911
- "Reptiles, batrachians and fishes collected by the Swedish Zoological Expedition to British East Africa 1911", 1911
- "Mammals collected by the Swedish Zoological Expedition to British East Africa 1911", 1912
- "Results of Dr. E. Mjöbergs Swedish Scientific Expeditions to Australia 1910-13. III. Reptiles", 1913 (co-author L. G. Andersson)
- "On a collection of reptiles from Kismayu", 1913 (co-author L. G. Andersson)
- "Results of Dr. E. Mjöberg's Swedish Scientific Expeditions to Australia 1910-1913. VII. Reptiles collected in northern Queensland", 1915 (co-author L. G. Andersson)
- "Zoological results of the Swedish Zoological Expeditions to Siam 1911-1912 and 1914. 2. Lizards", 1916
- "Mammals collected in Central Africa by Captain E. Arrhenius, 1917
- "On a new fossil porcupine from Henan with some remarks about the development of the Hystridae, 1924
- "Some speculations on the origin of the North American ornithic fauna", 1927.

== Geographic feature named for Lönnberg ==
Lönnberg Valley is an ice-free valley along the north coast of South Georgia. It cuts southwest from the base of Hound Bay to Nordenskjöld Glacier inland, and was surveyed by the SGS between 1951 and 1957.

== See also ==
- Category:Taxa named by Einar Lönnberg
