= Concinnia frerei =

Conservation status
- Vulnerable (IUCN 3.1)

Scientific classification
- Kingdom: Animalia
- Phylum: Chordata
- Class: Reptilia
- Order: Squamata
- Family: Scincidae
- Genus: Concinnia
- Species: C. frerei

Binomial name
- Concinnia frerei (Greer, 1992)

Synonyms
- Eulamprus frerei Greer, 1992; Concinnia frerei — Skinner, Hutchinson & M.S.Y. Lee, 2013

Species of lizard

Concinnia frerei, also known commonly as the stout bar-sided skink or the stout barsided skink, is a species of lizard in the family Scincidae. The species is endemic to Queensland in Australia.

== Etymology ==
The specific name, frerei, refers to Mount Bartle Frere where the holotype was collected.

== Geographic range ==
C. frerei is found in northeastern Queensland.

== Habitat ==
The preferred natural habitat of C. frerei is rocky mountaintops, at altitudes of 1,210–1,622 m (3,970–5,322 ft).

== Description ==
C. frerei has five digits on each of its four feet. The holotype, an adult male, has a snout-to-vent length of 6.6 cm (2.6 in), plus a tail length of 8.2 cm (3.2 in).

== Reproduction ==
C. frerei is ovoviviparous.
