= Nangura =

Nangur spiny skink

Conservation status
- Endangered (IUCN 3.1)

Scientific classification
- Kingdom: Animalia
- Phylum: Chordata
- Class: Reptilia
- Order: Squamata
- Family: Scincidae
- Genus: Nangura; Covacevich, Couper, & James, 1993
- Species: N. spinosa

Binomial name
- Nangura spinosa Covacevich, Couper, & James, 1993

Synonyms
- Concinnia spinosa Covacevich, Couper & James, 1993

Genus of lizards

Nangura spinosa, the Nangur spiny skink or Nangur skink, is a lizard known from two patches of dry-rainforest in South East Queensland, Australia. It was formerly placed in the monotypic genus Nangura but was moved to Concinnia following the molecular phylogenetic studies of O'Connor & Moritz (2003) and Skinner and co-authors (2013). It was returned to Nangura in 2018. This species is known only from two localities; the type locality, now in Nangura National Park, and a much smaller isolated population in Oakview National Park and adjacent Oakview State Forest. The total distribution spans just 42 square kilometers, within which this species occupies less than 4 square kilometers, with an estimated population size of less than 200 individuals. It is threatened by invasive species including cats, pigs, dogs, foxes and cane toads, by the invasive plant species Lantana camara, which increases fire risk and changes forest structure, and in some sites by logging and road maintenance. Consequently, it is listed as critically endangered under the Australian Environment Protection and Biodiversity Conservation Act 1999 It resembles Gnypetoscincus queenslandiae in its spiny scales and like that species it is live bearing. Along with minor differences in scalation, the Nangur spiny skink differs from other Australian Sphenomorphid skinks in its karyotype of 2n=28 chromosomes, where most others have 2n=30. It is also unlike related species in that it lives in burrows, which occur in small colonies through the dry rainforest habitat. There is some indication of parental care in this species, with adults sharing burrows with juveniles.
