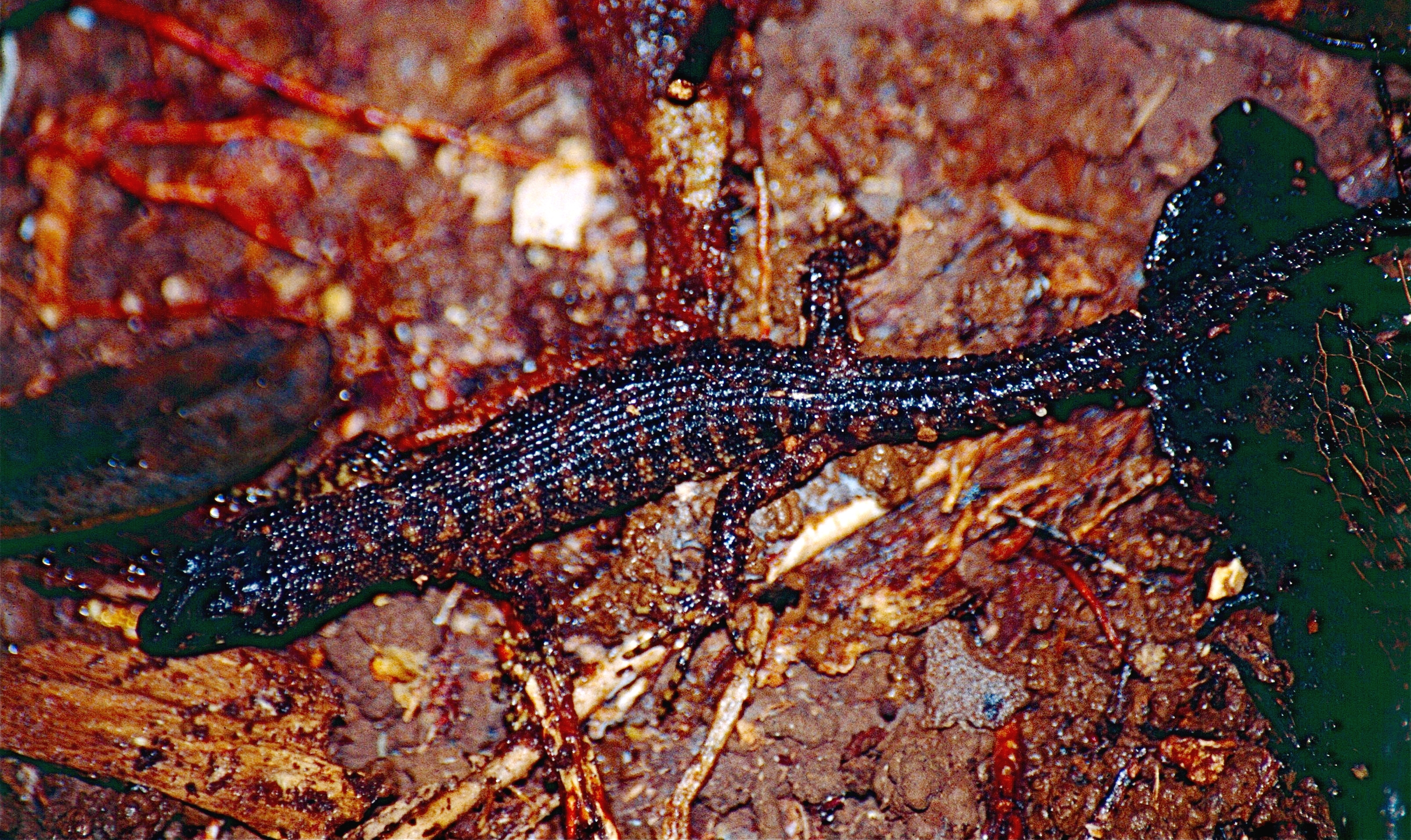

Conservation status
- Least Concern (IUCN 3.1)

Scientific classification
- Kingdom: Animalia
- Phylum: Chordata
- Class: Reptilia
- Order: Squamata
- Family: Scincidae
- Genus: Gnypetoscincus; Wells & Wellington, 1983
- Species: G. queenslandiae

Binomial name
- Gnypetoscincus queenslandiae (De Vis, 1890)

Synonyms
- Tropidophorus queenslandiae De Vis, 1890; Gnypetoscincus queenslandiae Wells & Wellington, 1983; Concinnia queensladiae Skinner et al., 2013

= Prickly forest skink =

Species of reptile

The prickly skink, or prickly forest skink (Gnypetoscincus queenslandiae), is a morphologically and genetically distinctive species of skink endemic to rainforests of the Wet Tropics of Queensland World Heritage Area, in north-eastern Australia. Unlike most small skinks, which have smooth scales, this species has rough, ridged and pointed scales. These keeled scales may be an adaptation to its high-rainfall habitat, to its microhabitat in rotting logs, or to camouflage it when moving through forest leaf-litter.

== Taxonomy ==
This species is a member of the Australian "Sphenomorphid" group of skinks (family Scincidae), which includes such genera as Ctenotus, Anomalopus and Eulamprus. It is monotypic in the genus Gnypetoscincus.

== Distribution and life History ==
The prickly skink is a habitat specialist restricted to closed canopy forest in high rainfall areas (rainforests) of the Australian Wet Tropics, extending from lowland tropical rainforest to montane forests on the adjacent hills and tablelands. Within these rainforests the prickly skink occurs within rotting logs and leaf litter and although locally abundant in some areas, it is rarely seen without searching. This is a well buffered environment with very low seasonality. This species is ovoviviparous, and despite living in an equable climate, reproduction is seasonal, with females giving birth to 2-5 young in February - April. Animals mature at a snout-vent length (SVL) of around 50 mm (2.0 in) and grow to a maximum SVL of 85 mm (3.3 in), with no obvious difference in external morphology or size between females and males. A skeletochronological study suggested that this corresponds with an age of 5 years at maturity and a maximum life-span around 10 years. Unlike most skinks this is a vocal species with high-pitched but audible calls recorded in the field and in captivity, associated with handling and with aggressive interactions among females.

== Phylogeography and Population Biology ==
Extensive upland areas of the Australian Wet Tropics, such as the Atherton Tableland, were cleared for farming, largely between 1940 and 1990, leaving many scattered pockets of rainforest surrounded by open pasture. The prickly skink is abundant throughout this area and has become a research subject for studies on the effect of habitat fragmentation on genetic diversity, gene flow and adaptation in a rainforest dependent species. A 1993 phylogeographic study by Moritz and co-authors using allozyme electrophoresis and restriction mapping of mitochondrial DNA (mtDNA) genomes found distinct genetic lineages in populations from the northern and southern wet tropics. These areas are currently connected by a ribbon of rainforest habitat, around 15 km (9.3 mi) wide, known as the Black Mountain Corridor or BMC, but historical climate modeling suggest that rainforests in the northern and southern wet tropics were separated by around 50 km (31 mi) of dry habitats in this area during Pleistocene glacial climate periods. However, the deep divergence between these lineages suggests much longer genetic isolation, with an estimated separation time of over five million years, and these populations may represent different species. Further study of mtDNA and allozyme variation from sites around the Atherton Tablelands (within the Southern Lineage) revealed additional phylogeographic structure, with a divergence between populations around the Bellenden Ker / Wooroonooran Range, east of the Atherton Tableland, and those in the central and southern tablelands. The late-Pleistocene divergence between these lineages (>0.5% across the mtDNA genome) is an order of magnitude less than that between the Northern and Southern Wet Tropics but is indicative of emergence from separate glacial refugia. The larger Wooroonooran refugium maintained higher diversity through the glacial period than the southern Tableland refugium and this natural historical difference in genetic diversity is much greater than any more recent, human induced, effects of forest clearing and fragmentation. More detailed study of genetic variation in populations from the Atherton tableland, using mtDNA sequences and microsatellite loci, revealed a slight reduction in allelic diversity and in the pattern of isolation by distance among populations. Also, Sumner found relatedness among males within fragments was lower in isolated forest fragments than within continuous forests, possibly reflecting greater dispersal within fragments due to lower habitat quality. However, these relatively slight differences show the difficulty of detecting effects of recent habitat fragmentation in a species with relatively low local population size and limited dispersal. Sumner and co-authors did find other ecological effects of fragmentation; skink abundance was higher in continuous forest sites than in fragments, and was lower in small habitat patches than in large patches, and on average, skinks from fragments were smaller than those from continuous forests. Estimates of population density and dispersal distances from capture-recapture methods and from genetic data are broadly consistent, with a density varying from 65 - 136 individuals per ha, and a dispersal distance of 404 – 843 m^{2}, respectively. Genetic estimates of relatedness among individuals found under the same log revealed that juveniles tend to stay with their parents for 1–2 years and subsequently disperse to other logs, with marked individuals observed 0–80 m (0–262 ft) away from their initial capture site over three years.
