= Lars Gabriel Andersson =

Swedish herpetologist (1868–1951)

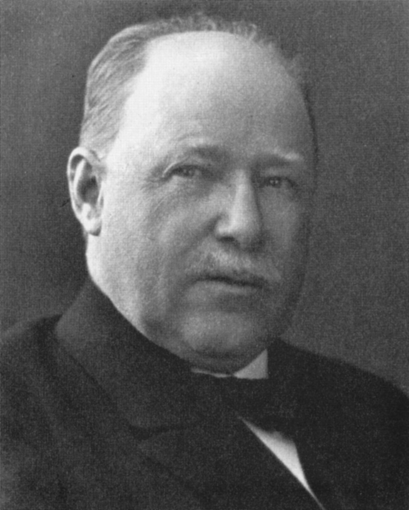
- Lars Gabriel Andersson (ca. 1935)
- Born: 22 February 1868; Vagnhärad
- Died: 13 February 1951 (aged 82); Lidingö
- Occupation: Swedish herpetologist

Lars Gabriel Andersson (22 February 1868 – 13 February 1951) was a Swedish schoolteacher and herpetologist.

== Education and career ==
He studied at Uppsala University and earned his PhD in 1909. During his long career he taught classes at several schools in and near Stockholm. In 1894–95 and from 1897 to 1902 he worked as an assistant in the vertebrate department at the Naturhistoriska riksmuseet in Stockholm.

== Taxa ==
With zoologist Einar Lönnberg he described the following herpetological species:

- Aipysurus tenuis, 1913
- Atractaspis engdahli, 1913
- Eulamprus brachyosoma, 1915.
- Eulamprus tympanum, 1915
- Gastrotheca microdiscus, (Andersson in Lönnberg and Andersson, 1910).
- Glaphyromorphus mjobergi, 1915
- Strophurus taeniatus, 1913.

On his own, he described:

- Didynamipus sjostedti, 1903

== Works by Andersson that have been published in English ==
- "Catalogue of Linnean type-specimens of snakes in the Royal Museum in Stockholm", 1899.
- "Catalogue of Linnean type-specimens of Linnaeus's reptilia in the Royal Museum in Stockholm", 1900.
- "Some new species of snakes from Cameroon and South America, belonging to the collections of the Royal museum in Stockholm", 1901.
- "Reptiles, batrachians and fishes collected by the Swedish zoological expedition to British East Africa 1911", (with Einar Lönnberg), 1911.
- "Batrachians from Queensland", 1913.
- "Results of Dr. E. Mjöbergs Swedish Scientific Expeditions to Australia 1910–1913", part 4. Batrachians. (in reference to Swedish zoologist and ethnographer Eric Mjöberg).
- "Reptiles collected in Northern Queensland", 1915 (with Einar Lönnberg).
- "Notes on the reptiles and batrachians in the Zoological museum at Gothenburg, with an account of some new species", 1916.
- "A new salamander from Sakhalin", 1917.
- "Reptiles and batrachians from the Central Sahara", 1935.
