= Orange-speckled forest-skink =

Conservation status
- Data Deficient (IUCN 3.1)

Scientific classification
- Kingdom: Animalia
- Phylum: Chordata
- Class: Reptilia
- Order: Squamata
- Family: Scincidae
- Genus: Tumbunascincus; Skinner, Hutchinson, & Lee, 2013
- Species: T. luteilateralis

Binomial name
- Tumbunascincus luteilateralis (Covacevich & McDonald, 1980)

Synonyms
- Sphenomorphus luteilateralis; Concinnia luteilateralis; Eulamprus luteilateralis

Species of lizard

The orange-speckled forest-skink (Tumbunascincus luteilateralis), monotypic in the genus Tumbunascincus, is endemic to Queensland in Australia.
