= List of reptiles of Tasmania =

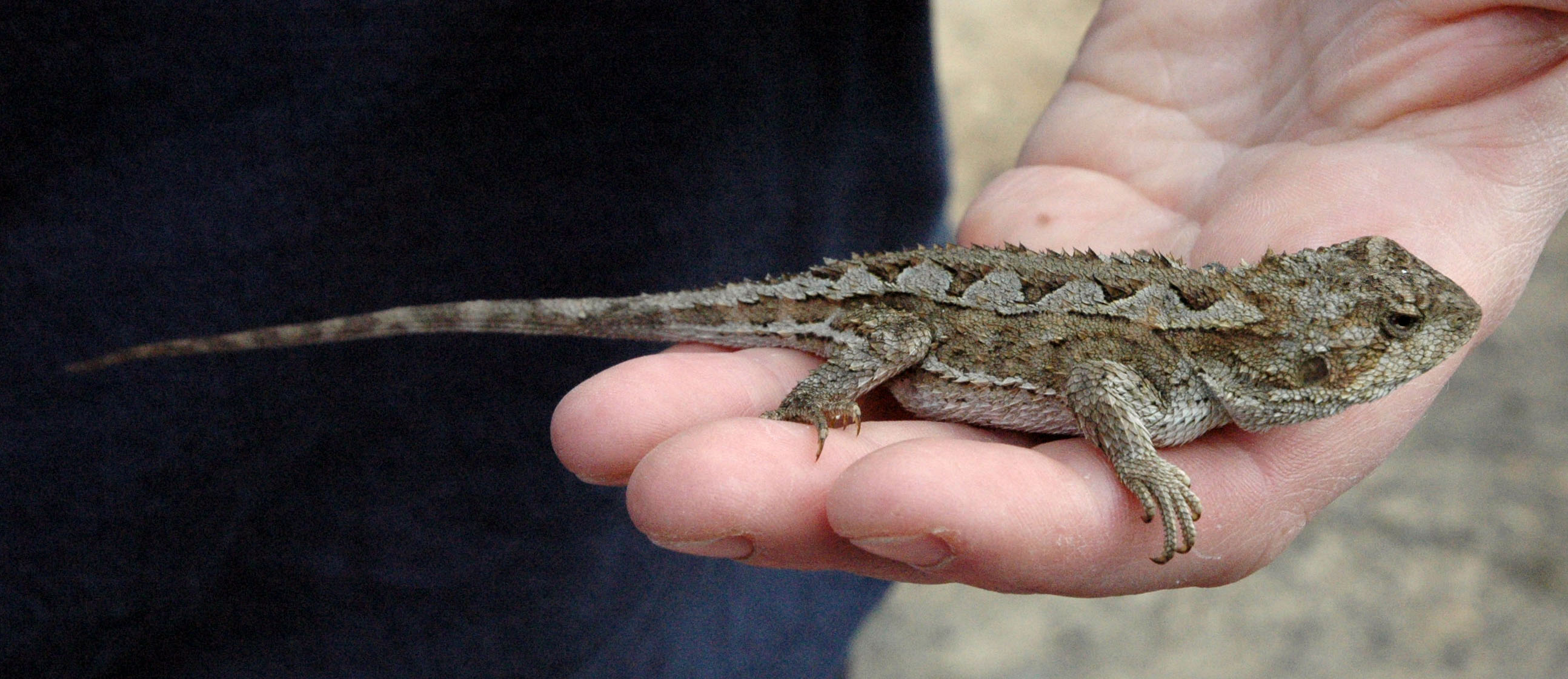
Rankinia diemensis

This is a list of reptiles occurring in Tasmania:

== Order: Squamata (lizards and snakes) ==
=== Lizards ===
Image	Scientific name	Distribution
	Rankinia diemensis, mountain dragon	
	Bassiana duperreyi, eastern three-lined skink	
	Cyclodomorphus casuarinae, she-oak skink	Tasmania
	Egernia whitii, White's skink	
	Eulamprus tympanum, southern water skink	New South Wales, Victoria and Rodondo Island, Tasmania
	Lampropholis delicata, delicate skink	Eastern Australia, including Tasmania. Accidentally introduced to New Zealand, Hawaii, and Lord Howe Island.
	Lerista bougainvillii, Bougainville's skink	South-eastern Australia, including north-eastern Tasmania
	Carinascincus ocellatus, spotted skink	Tasmania
	Carinascinus microlepidotus, southern snow skink	Tasmania
	Carinascinus greeni, alpine cool-skink	Tasmania
	Carinascinus metallicus, metallic skink	Southern Victoria and Tasmania
	Carinascinus orocryptus, Tasmanian mountain skink	Tasmania
	Carinascinus palfreymani, Pedra Branca skink	Pedra Branca, Tasmania
	Pseudomoia entrecasteauxii, southern grass skink	
	Pseudemoia pagenstecheri, southern grass tussock skink	
	Pseudemoia rawlinsoni, glossy grass skink	New South Wales, South Australia, Victoria and Tasmania
	Tiliqua nigrolutea, blotched blue-tongued lizard	New South Wales, South Australia, Victoria, Australian Capital Territory, and Tasmania

=== Snakes ===
Image	Scientific name	Distribution
	Austrelaps superbus, lowland copperhead	South-eastern Australia, including Tasmania
	Drysdalia coronoides, white-lipped snake	South-eastern Australia, including Tasmania
	Hydrophis platurus, yellow-bellied sea snake	Tropics. Reported sightings in colder waters such as California, New Zealand, and Tasmania.
	Notechis scutatus, tiger snake	Western Australia, South Australia, Victoria, New South Wales and Tasmania

== Order: Testudines (turtles and tortoises) ==
Image	Scientific name	Distribution
	Caretta caretta, loggerhead sea turtle	
	Chelodina longicollis, eastern-long necked turtle	East Australia, introduced to Tasmania
	Chelonia mydas, green sea turtle	
	Dermochelys coriacea, leatherback sea turtle	
