= Lampropholis isla =

Scientific classification
- Kingdom: Animalia
- Phylum: Chordata
- Class: Reptilia
- Order: Squamata
- Family: Scincidae
- Genus: Lampropholis
- Species: L. isla

Binomial name
- Lampropholis isla Hoskin, 2025

Species of skink

Lamphropholis isla, also known as the Scawfell Island sunskink, is a species of skink belonging to the subfamily Eugongylinae. It is endemic to the rainforest areas of Scawfell Island off the coast of Queensland, Australia.

It is a robust species with the head and body being continuous with almost narrowing of the neck. The snout is rounded and its nasals are widely separated. Their bodies are mostly a uniform light brown color with the occasional darker flecks. A pale faint and narrow strip can be seen starting from the ear and extending to the midbody. Males tend to have a copper color on the dorsal surface of their heads. They also have prominent lateral orange markings.

== Discovery ==
This species was discovered by Professor Conrad Hoskin during a reptile survey of Scawfell Island that occurred from the 16–19 of November in 2021. In the year 1994, two specimens were collected and assigned to the species Lampropholis delicata.

== Taxonomy ==
Lampropholis isla is possibly a sister species to Lampropholis couperi which together possibly form a group with Lampropholis adonis. However the genetic evidence to support this is weak.
