= Carinascincus microlepidotus =

Conservation status
- Vulnerable (IUCN 3.1)

Scientific classification
- Kingdom: Animalia
- Phylum: Chordata
- Class: Reptilia
- Order: Squamata
- Family: Scincidae
- Genus: Carinascincus
- Species: C. microlepidotus

Binomial name
- Carinascincus microlepidotus (O'Shaughnessy, 1874)

Synonyms
- Niveoscincus microlepidotus

Species of lizard

Carinascincus microlepidotus, commonly known as the boulder cool-skink or southern snow skink, is a member of the family Scincidae. Endemic to Tasmania, Australia, this diurnal species basks on the exposed rock faces of the alpine boulder fields they inhabit.

== Classification ==
The species was previously known as Niveoscincus microlepidotus but was since reclassified as Carinascincus along with other members of the genus.

Other species within the genus Carinascincus include:

- Carinascincus coventryi
- Carinascincus greeni
- Carinascincus metallicus
- Carinascincus ocellatus
- Carinascincus orocrypus
- Carinascincus palfreymani
- Carinascincus pretiosus

== Description ==
Carinascincus microlepidotus is grey or olive-brown in colour, with dark, narrow stripes running along either side of the body. Their backs are flecked dark brown or black. They have small scales, hence the name microlepidotus, with 'micro' meaning 'small' and 'lepidotus' meaning 'scaled' in Greek.

C. microlepidotus can be distinguished from other species of Carinascincus by the absence of both a black vertebral stripe and pale stripes along the sides of the body.

The maximum length and weight of C. microlepidotus is 6.9 centimetres, and 5 grams. The species lives up to 13 years.

== Habitat and Distribution ==
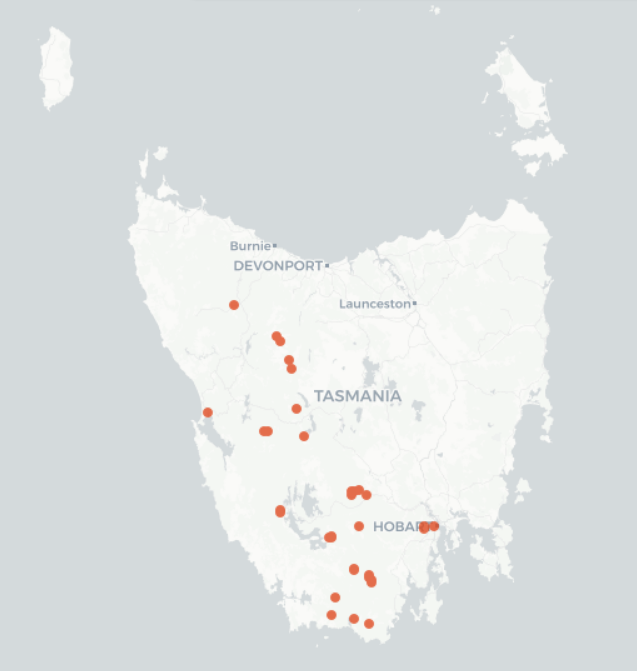
Carinascincus microlepidotus distribution across Tasmania. Source: Atlas of Living Australia.

Carinascincus microlepidotus is an alpine species, found in the Highlands of central and Southern Tasmania at an elevation of 800-1270 metres. The species is numerous upon kunanyi/Mount Wellington but is found as far north as Cradle Mountain.

Within these regions, their preferred microhabitat is dolerite boulder fields, where they bask on exposed rocks. During winter, individuals seek shelter under rock crevices and within vegetation to avoid extreme cold.

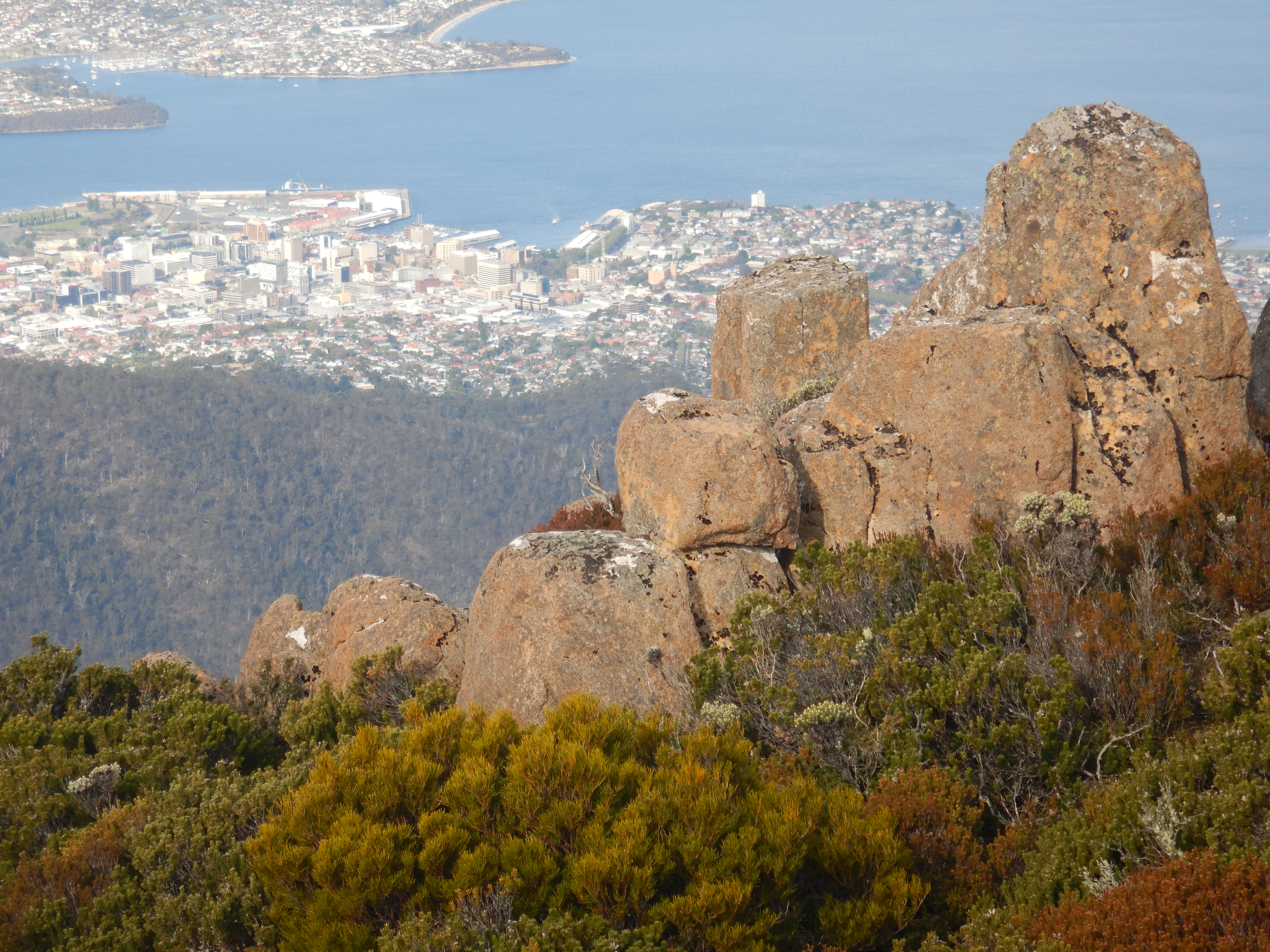
Carinascincus microlepidotus commonly bask on the dolerite boulders of kunanyi Mount Wellington.

Where they co-occur with Carinascincus greeni, C. microlepidotus instead occupies heathland and basks on top of cushion plants. This is because C. greeni competitively excludes C. microlepidotus from the optimal boulder field habitat. Heathland is a sub-optimal microhabitat as it provides fewer ideal basking areas, therefore skinks occupying these areas have a smaller than average body size.

Territory competition also occurs within-species. C. microlepidotus males have overlapping territories, as they move through one another's home ranges in search of prey and mates. Encounters between males result in conflict over territory.

== Diet ==
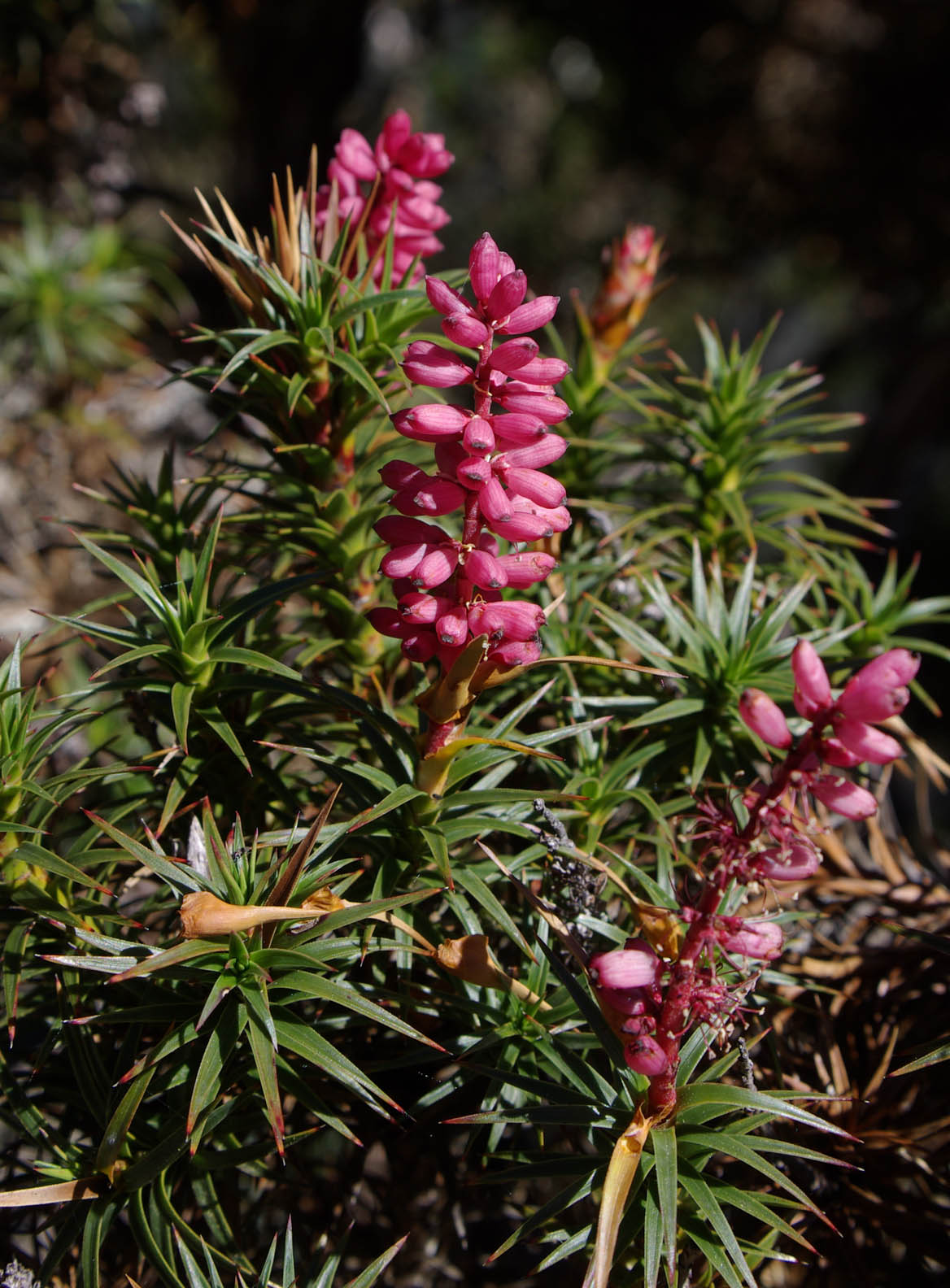
Richea scoparia flowers near Lake Dobson, Mount Field National Park, Tasmania. Carinascincus microlepidotus feed on the flowers, which assists the alpine plants' reproductive cycle.

Carinascincus microlepidotus is predominately an insectivorous species, however they feed on Richea scoparia (Honey Bush) plants during the flowering season of December to March. This interaction is mutually beneficial to both species. The skinks tear off and chew on the fused petals (calyptrum) of the flower (inflorescence) to feed on the nectar. Tearing the calyptrum exposes the reproductive organs of the inflorescence which assists with successful cross pollination. As high skink activity coincides with mild weather, removal of the calyptra typically occurs during favourable conditions for pollination. Further, seed release is increased by 87%.

Other species which feed on R. scoparia are not similarly beneficial. For example, the introduced bumblebee Bombus terrestris feeds on the calyptrum without fully removing it, hence providing no benefit to the reproductive cycle of the plant. Therefore, the relationship with C. microlepidotus is key to the reproduction of R. scoparia in the unpredictable environmental conditions of alpine Tasmania.

== Reproduction ==
Carinascincus microlepidotus is viviparous, meaning females give birth to live young. Litters are produced biennially (every two years), with litters of 1-5 individuals.

During the mating season of summer to early autumn, males and females form month-long mate pairings. Females carry sperm within their oviducts until they ovulate in spring, and embryos are fully developed by early autumn. Females continue to carry fully developed young over winter, and do not give birth until the following spring.

Pregnant females under cold spring conditions can delay birth by a further four weeks, whereas warm conditions result in birth just four months post fertilisation. This suggests prolonged gestation and flexibility in birth time is an adaptation to climate. Delaying birth until spring ensures young have the greatest chance of survival due to the mild weather and abundance of food. Young born in autumn cannot survive the harsh conditions of winter in alpine Tasmania.

== Threats ==
Carinascincus microlepidotus is listed as 'Vulnerable' under the IUCN Red List. The major threat is climate change, resulting in an increase in severe weather events such as drought, as well as a reduction in the overall amount and quality of suitable habitat. Under current climate change projections, up to 60% of the species' current habitat may be lost by 2050.

As the climate becomes warmer, lowland species including Carinascincus metallicus and Carinascincus ocellatus encroach upon C. microlepidotus habitat. Slow reproduction and low fecundity make C. microlepidotus sensitive to increased competition, as they may quickly become outnumbered by the lowland species and therefore unable to compete for increasingly limited resources.

Further, C. microlepidotus has a high rate of evaporative water loss, meaning they rapidly lose water from their bodies. This makes the species drought sensitive. Rainfall and snowfall in alpine Tasmania are expected to continue declining, as they have over the past several decades.
