= Praeteropus =

Scientific classification
- Kingdom: Animalia
- Phylum: Chordata
- Class: Reptilia
- Order: Squamata
- Family: Scincidae
- Subfamily: Sphenomorphinae
- Genus: Praeteropus; Hutchinson, Couper, Amey, & Wilmer, 2021

Species
- 4, see text.

Genus of lizards

Praeteropus is a genus of worm-skinks, smallish smooth-scaled burrowing lizards in the family Scincidae. The genus is endemic to the eastern half of Australia. The genus belongs to a clade in the Sphenomorphus group which contains such genera as Ctenotus and the close relatives Eulamprus and Gnypetoscincus (Austin & Arnold 2006).

== Species ==
The following species are recognized as being valid.

- Praeteropus auxilliger Hutchinson, Couper, Amey & Wilmer, 2021
- Praeteropus brevicollis Greer & Cogger, 1985 – short-necked worm-skink (northeastern Australia)
- Praeteropus gowi Greer & Cogger, 1985 – Gow's burrowing skink, speckled worm-skink (northeastern Australia)
- Praeteropus monachus Hutchinson, Couper, Amey & Wilmer, 2021

Nota bene: A binomial authority in parentheses indicates that the species was originally described in a genus other than Praeteropus.
