= Praeteropus brevicollis =

Conservation status
- Least Concern (IUCN 3.1)

Scientific classification
- Kingdom: Animalia
- Phylum: Chordata
- Class: Reptilia
- Order: Squamata
- Family: Scincidae
- Genus: Praeteropus
- Species: P. brevicollis

Binomial name
- Praeteropus brevicollis (Greer & Cogger, 1985)

Synonyms
- Anomalopus (Vermiseps) brevicollis Greer & Cogger, 1985; Anomalopus brevicollis Cogger, 2000

Species of lizard

The short-necked worm-skink (Praeteropus brevicollis) is a species of skink in the family Scincidae. It is endemic to Queensland, Australia. A completely limbless, fossorial lizard, it has an elongated, worm-like body and burrows through soil and leaf litter in forests across central and south-east Queensland.

== Taxonomy ==
The species was first described in 1985 by Allen Eddy Greer and Harold Cogger in a revision of the reduce-limbed and limbless skinks assigned to the genus Anomalopus, published in the Records of the Australian Museum. The holotype, collected by A. Greer and P. Greer on 21 August 1976, is from a site 1.0 km east of Frenchville Road via Pilbeam Drive on Mount Archer, Queensland. In that 1985 paper, Greer and Cogger argued that Anomalopus was polyphyletic and subdivided it into three genera, one with two subgenera; they placed this species in the subgenus Vermiseps as Anomalopus (Vermiseps) brevicollis. Later authors treated the subgenera as synonyms, referring to the species simply as Anomalopus brevicollis.

In 2021, Mark N. Hutchinson, Patrick Couper, Andrew Amey, and Jessica Worthington Wilmer published a major revision using new DNA sequence data and micro-CT scanning of skeletons, which corroborated earlier molecular phylogenetic studies showing that Anomalopus as traditionally defined comprised three distinct clades. They elevated the limbless species formerly placed in Vermiseps to the new genus Praeteropus, resulting in the current combination Praeteropus brevicollis.

=== Etymology ===
The specific name brevicollis is derived from the Latin brevis ("short") and collum ("neck"), referring to the species' reduced number of cervical vertebrae — eight instead of the nine typical of related skinks.

== Description ==
Praeteropus brevicollis is a completely limbless skink with a smooth, elongated body that gives it a resemblance to an earthworm. It reaches a maximum total length of about 16 cm, with a snout–vent length of up to 80 mm and a tail of similar length. The upper body is pale brown, with the colouration darkening towards the head and tail; the tip of the tail is uniformly black. The dorsal scales are flecked with brown, and these flecks tend to align along the body, giving the impression of faint longitudinal stripes. The underside is white or flesh-coloured, and the chin and throat are spotted with dark brown.

The species has movable, scaly eyelids and lacks external ear openings. It is distinguished from all other members of the former Anomalopus by its complete lack of limbs, nasals in broad contact, and 84–102 paravertebral scales. It is also unique in having the first sternal rib arising from the eighth presacral vertebra rather than the ninth, and unique among species formerly placed in Vermiseps in having the frontal and maxilla bones in contact, thereby separating the prefrontal and nasal. Like most skinks, it is capable of tail autotomy as a defensive mechanism; the detached tail wriggles to distract predators while the animal escapes.

== Distribution and habitat ==
Praeteropus brevicollis is endemic to Queensland. Its range extends from the Mount Abbot and Bowen area on the central coast southward to the Gladstone area and south-east Queensland, and inland to Clermont and Theodore.

The species inhabits well-mulched, friable soil under logs, rocks, and leaf litter in a range of habitats from open dry sclerophyll forest to rainforest, including vine scrub, semi-evergreen vine thicket, and monsoon forest. It is found on sandy and cracking clay soils as well as rock outcrops, and shows some preference for habitat ecotones — areas where two habitat types meet — at elevations of 250 to 1,000 m above sea level.

== Behaviour and ecology ==
The short-necked worm-skink is fossorial and highly cryptic. When disturbed, it burrows deep into soft substrates or retreats into rock crevices. Related species in the genus are known to create systems of permanent burrows. It forages in dense mulch beneath the shelter of rocks and logs and is assumed to feed on terrestrial arthropods.

== Reproduction ==
Praeteropus brevicollis is oviparous. Females lay clutches of one to two eggs between August and September.

== Conservation ==
The species is assessed as Least Concern on the IUCN Red List. In Queensland, it is listed as Rare under the Nature Conservation Act 1992. Suspected threats include habitat destruction from land clearing, livestock grazing, and inappropriate fire regimes; disturbance to microhabitat through removal of surface rocks and damage by feral pigs; and in vine thicket habitats, soil compaction and removal of understorey by black-striped wallabies. Surveys of the Brigalow Belt bioregion have been recommended to better assess the distribution and conservation needs of this and other threatened reptile species in the region.
