= Satinay sand skink =

Conservation status
- Least Concern (IUCN 3.1)

Scientific classification
- Kingdom: Animalia
- Phylum: Chordata
- Class: Reptilia
- Order: Squamata
- Family: Scincidae
- Genus: Coggeria; Couper, Covacevich, Marsterson & Shea, 1996
- Species: C. naufragus

Binomial name
- Coggeria naufragus Couper, Covacevich, Marsterson & Shea, 1996

Species of lizard

The Satinay sand skink (Coggeria naufragus), also known commonly as the Fraser Island sand skink, is a species of lizard in the family Scincidae. The species is native to Australia.

== Taxonomy ==
C. naufragus is the type species of the monotypic genus Coggeria.

== Etymology ==
The generic name, Coggeria, is in honor of Australian herpetologist Harold Cogger.

The specific name, naufragus, means "shipwrecked" or "castaway" in Latin.

== Geographic range ==
C. naufragus is endemic to Fraser Island, Queensland, Australia.

== Habitat ==
The preferred natural habitat of C. naufragus is forest.

== Description ==
C. naufragus has an elongated body and very small legs. There are three digits on each front foot, and three digits on each hind foot.

== Behavior ==
C. naufragus is terrestrial and fossorial.

== Reproduction ==
The mode of reproduction of C. naufragus is unknown.
