= Lampropholis bellendenkerensis =

Scientific classification
- Kingdom: Animalia
- Phylum: Chordata
- Class: Reptilia
- Order: Squamata
- Family: Scincidae
- Genus: Lampropholis
- Species: L. bellendenkerensis

Binomial name
- Lampropholis bellendenkerensis Singhal, Hoskin, Couper, Potter & Moritz, 2018

Species of lizard

Lampropholis bellendenkerensis is a species of skink, a lizard in the family Scincidae. The species is endemic to Australia.
