= Praeteropus gowi =

Conservation status
- Least Concern (IUCN 3.1)

Scientific classification
- Kingdom: Animalia
- Phylum: Chordata
- Class: Reptilia
- Order: Squamata
- Family: Scincidae
- Genus: Praeteropus
- Species: P. gowi

Binomial name
- Praeteropus gowi (Greer & Cogger, 1985)

Synonyms
- Anomalopus gowi Greer & Cogger, 1985; Praeteropus gowi — Hutchinson et al., 2021

Species of lizard

Praeteropus gowi, also known commonly as Gow's burrowing skink and the speckled worm-skink, is a species of lizard in the family Scincidae. The species is endemic to Queensland in Australia.

== Etymology ==
The specific name, gowi, is in honor of Australian herpetologist Graeme Francis Gow.

== Habitat ==
The preferred natural habitats of P. gowi are forest and shrubland.

== Description ==
P. gowi is limbless. It has scaly, movable eyelids. It does not have external ear openings.

== Reproduction ==
P. gowi is oviparous.
