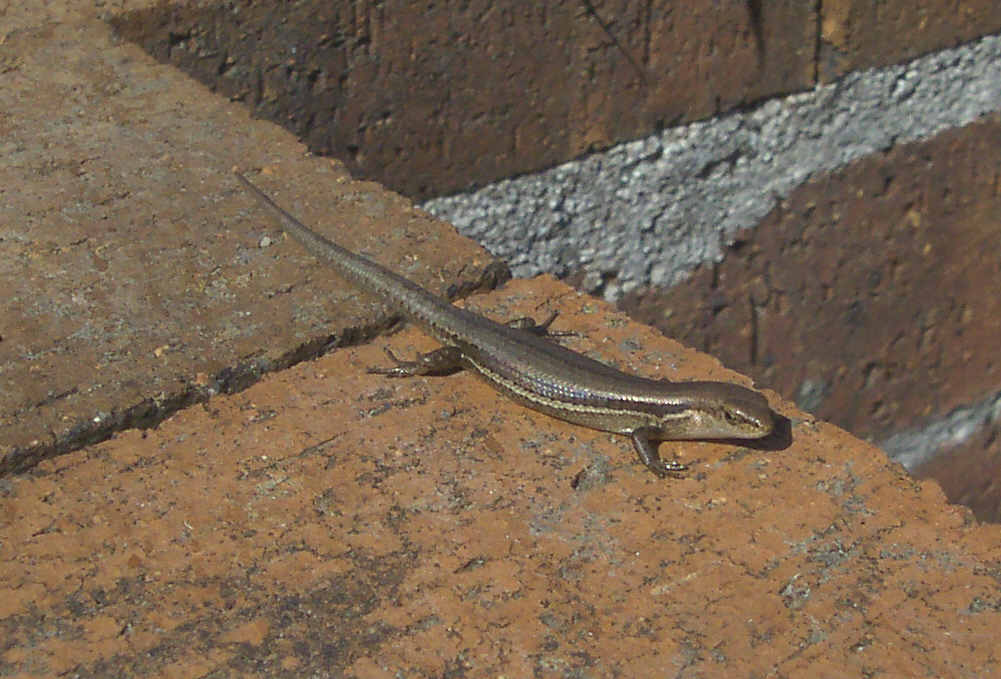
- Lampropholis guichenoti, common garden skink

Scientific classification
- Kingdom: Animalia
- Phylum: Chordata
- Class: Reptilia
- Order: Squamata
- Family: Scincidae
- Subfamily: Eugongylinae
- Genus: Lampropholis; Fitzinger, 1843

Species
- 15, see text

= Lampropholis =

Genus of lizards

Lampropholis is a genus of skinks, commonly known as sunskinks, in the lizard subfamily Eugongylinae of the family Scincidae. The genus Lampropholis was previously found to belong to a clade with the genera Niveoscincus, Leiolopisma and others of the Eugongylus group within Lygosominae. All species of Lampropholis are endemic to Australia. For similar skinks see genera Bassiana, Pseudemoia, and Niveoscincus.

== Diet ==
Sunskinks feed on invertebrates such as crickets, moths, slaters (woodlice), earthworms, and cockroaches.

== Species ==
The following 15 species are recognized as being valid.

- Lampropholis adonis Ingram, 1991 – diamond-shielded sunskink, Ingram's litter skink
- Lampropholis amicula Ingram & Rawlinson, 1981 – friendly sunskink
- Lampropholis bellendenkerensis Singhal, Hoskin, Couper, Potter & Moritz, 2018
- Lampropholis caligula Ingram & Rawlinson, 1981 – montane sunskink
- Lampropholis coggeri Ingram, 1991 – northern rainforest sunskink
- Lampropholis colossus Ingram, 1991 – Bunya sunskink
- Lampropholis couperi Ingram, 1991 – plain-backed sunskink
- Lampropholis delicata (De Vis, 1888) – delicate skink, rainbow skink, garden skink, delicate grass skink
- Lampropholis elliotensis Singhal, Hoskin, Couper, Potter & Moritz, 2018
- Lampropholis elongata Greer, 1997 – long sunskink, elongate sunskink
- Lampropholis guichenoti (A.M.C. Duméril & Bibron, 1839) – common garden skink, pale-flecked garden sunskink, grass skink, Guichenot's grass skink
- Lampropholis isla (Hoskin, 2025)
- Lampropholis mirabilis Ingram & Rawlinson, 1981 – saxicoline sunskink
- Lampropholis robertsi Ingram, 1991 – grey-bellied sunskink
- Lampropholis similis Singhal, Hoskin, Couper, Potter & Moritz, 2018 – southern rainforest sunskink

Nota bene: A binomial authority in parentheses indicates that the species was originally described in a genus other than Lampropholis.
