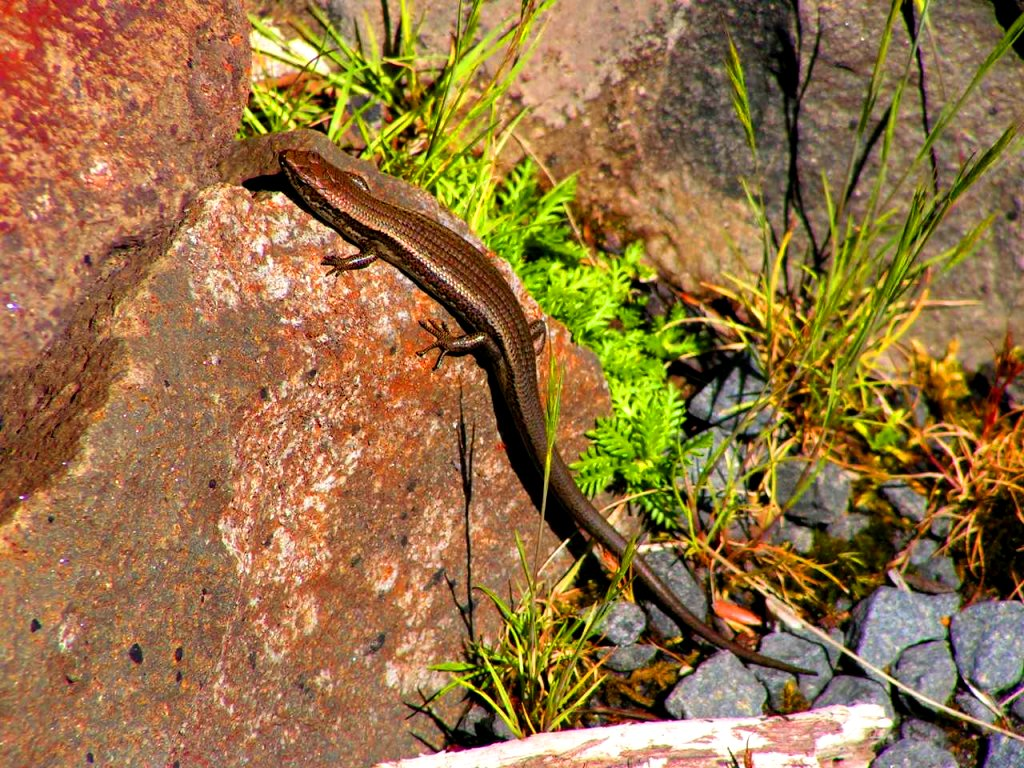
- Carinascincus metallicus, metallic skink, near Cradle Mountain, Tasmania

Scientific classification
- Kingdom: Animalia
- Phylum: Chordata
- Class: Reptilia
- Order: Squamata
- Family: Scincidae
- Subfamily: Eugongylinae
- Genus: Carinascincus; Wells & Wellington, 1985

Species
- Eight, see text.

Synonyms
- Niveoscincus Hutchinson et al., 1990

= Carinascincus =

Genus of lizards

Carinascincus is a genus of lizards, commonly called snow skinks or cool-skinks, in the subfamily Eugongylinae of the family Scincidae. Species in the genus Carinoscincus are native mainly to Tasmania or Victoria, Australia. Then recognised as the genus Niveoscincus, it was found to belong to a clade with the genera Carlia, Lampropholis and others of the Eugongylus group within Lygosominae. Cogger has rejected the use of the junior name Niveoscincus and recognizes the valid senior generic name Carinascincus for the group. For similar skinks see genera Pseudemoia, Lampropholis, and Bassiana. These skinks have adapted to the cooler weather of southern Australia and particularly Tasmania, hence the common names.

== Species ==
- Carinascincus coventryi (Rawlinson, 1975) – southern forest cool-skink
- Carinascincus greeni (Rawlinson, 1975) – alpine cool-skink or northern snow skink
- Carinascincus metallicus (O'Shaughnessy, 1874) – metallic skink or metallic cool-skink
- Carinascincus microlepidotus (O'Shaughnessy, 1874) – boulder cool-skink or southern snow skink
- Carinascincus ocellatus (Gray, 1845) – spotted skink, ocellated cool-skink, or ocellated skink
- Carinascincus orocryptus (Hutchinson, Schwaner & Medlock, 1988) – Tasmanian mountain skink, heath cool-skink, or mountain skink
- Carinascincus palfreymani (Rawlinson, 1974) – Pedra Branca skink, Pedra Branca cool-skink, or red-throated skink
- Carinascincus pretiosus (O'Shaughnessy, 1874) – Tasmanian tree skink or agile cool-skink
