= Praeteropus monachus =

Scientific classification
- Domain: Eukaryota
- Kingdom: Animalia
- Phylum: Chordata
- Class: Reptilia
- Order: Squamata
- Family: Scincidae
- Genus: Praeteropus
- Species: P. monachus

Binomial name
- Praeteropus monachus Hutchinson, Couper, Amey, & Wilmer, 2021

Species of lizard

Praeteropus monachus is a species of skink found in Queensland in Australia.
