= Lampropholis similis =

Scientific classification
- Kingdom: Animalia
- Phylum: Chordata
- Class: Reptilia
- Order: Squamata
- Family: Scincidae
- Genus: Lampropholis
- Species: L. similis

Binomial name
- Lampropholis similis Singhal, Hoskin, Couper, Potter, & Moritz, 2018

Species of lizard

The Southern Rainforest Sunskink (Lampropholis similis) is a species of skink, a lizard in the family Scincidae. The species is endemic to Queensland in Australia.
