= Praeteropus auxilliger =

Scientific classification
- Kingdom: Animalia
- Phylum: Chordata
- Class: Reptilia
- Order: Squamata
- Family: Scincidae
- Genus: Praeteropus
- Species: P. auxilliger

Binomial name
- Praeteropus auxilliger Hutchinson, Couper, Amey, & Wilmer, 2021

Species of lizard

Praeteropus auxilliger, more commonly known as the sandstone legless skink or the sandstone worm-skink, is a species of skink endemic to Central Queensland in Australia, particularly around Lake Elphinstone.
