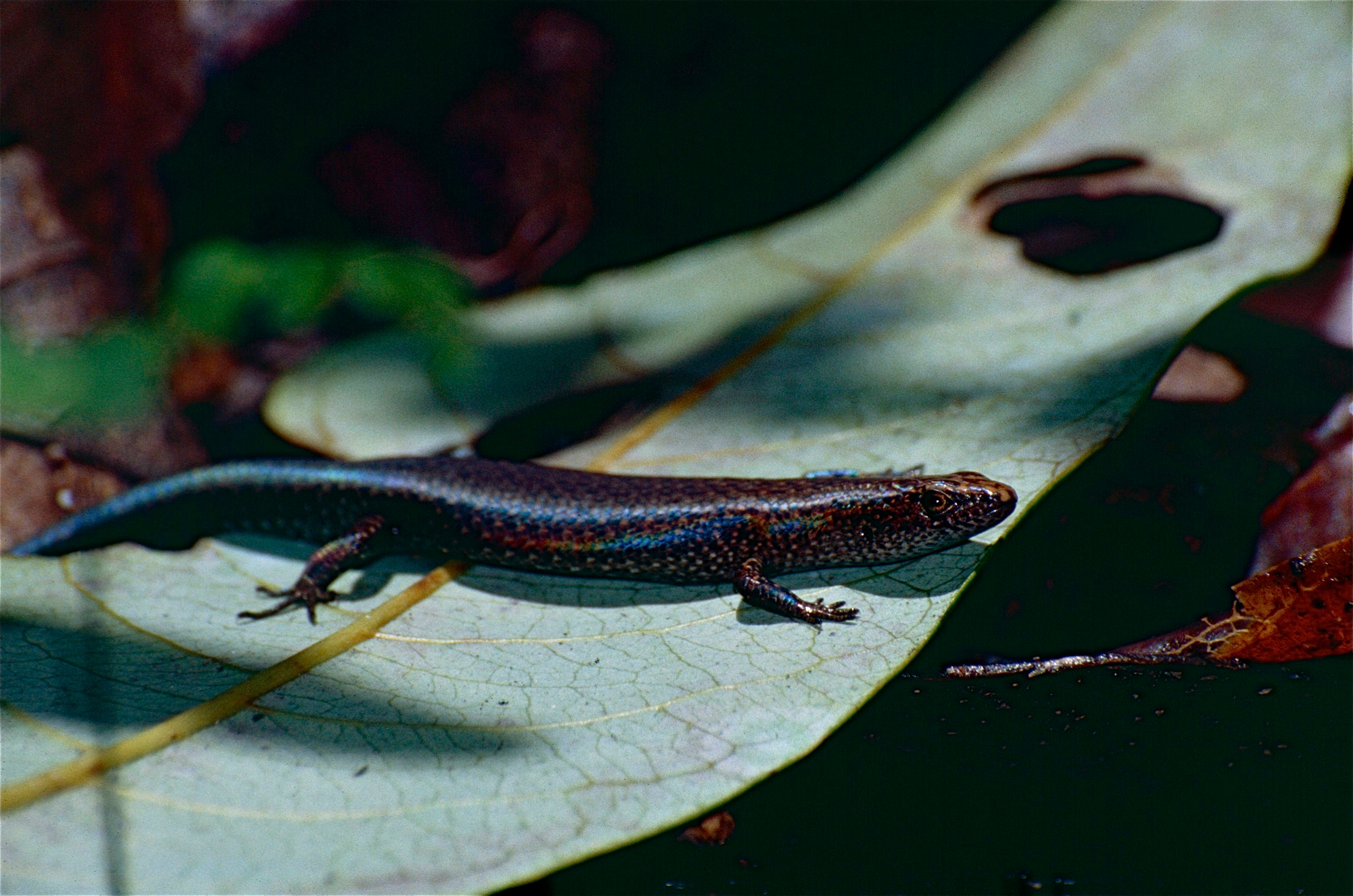

Conservation status
- Least Concern (IUCN 3.1)

Scientific classification
- Kingdom: Animalia
- Phylum: Chordata
- Class: Reptilia
- Order: Squamata
- Family: Scincidae
- Genus: Lampropholis
- Species: L. coggeri

Binomial name
- Lampropholis coggeri Ingram, 1991

= Lampropholis coggeri =

Species of lizard

Lampropholis coggeri, also known commonly as the northern sun skink and the rainforest sunskink, is a species of lizard in the family Scincidae. The species is endemic to Queensland in Australia.

== Etymology ==
The specific name, coggeri, is in honor of Australian herpetologist Harold Cogger.

== Habitat ==
The preferred natural habitat of L. coggeri is forest, at altitudes from sea level to 1,100 m (3,600 ft).

== Description ==
Adults of L. coggeri have a snout-to-vent length (SVL) of 3.2–4.4 cm (1.3–1.7 in). There are five digits on each of the four feet.

== Behavior ==
L. coggeri is a terrestrial species, living and foraging on the forest floor, and basking in sunny areas.

== Reproduction ==
L. coggeri is oviparous.
