= Lampropholis elongata =

Conservation status
- Data Deficient (IUCN 3.1)

Scientific classification
- Kingdom: Animalia
- Phylum: Chordata
- Class: Reptilia
- Order: Squamata
- Family: Scincidae
- Genus: Lampropholis
- Species: L. elongata

Binomial name
- Lampropholis elongata Greer, 1997

Species of lizard

Lampropholis elongata, the long sunskink or elongate sunskink, is a species of skink, a lizard in the family Scincidae. The species is endemic to eastern Australia.
