= Lampropholis adonis =

Conservation status
- Least Concern (IUCN 3.1)

Scientific classification
- Kingdom: Animalia
- Phylum: Chordata
- Class: Reptilia
- Order: Squamata
- Family: Scincidae
- Genus: Lampropholis
- Species: L. adonis

Binomial name
- Lampropholis adonis Ingram, 1991

Synonyms
- Lampropholis adonis Ingram, 1991; Ndurascincus adonis — Wells, 2002; Lampropholis adonis — Couper, 2006

Species of lizard

Lampropholis adonis, also known commonly as the diamond shielded sunskink and Ingram's litter skink, is a species of skink, a lizard in the family Scincidae. The species is endemic to Queensland in Australia.

== Etymology ==
The specific name, adonis, refers to the Greek mythological god Adonis.

== Habitat ==
The preferred natural habitats of L. adonis are forest and freshwater wetlands.

== Reproduction ==
L. adonis is oviparous.
