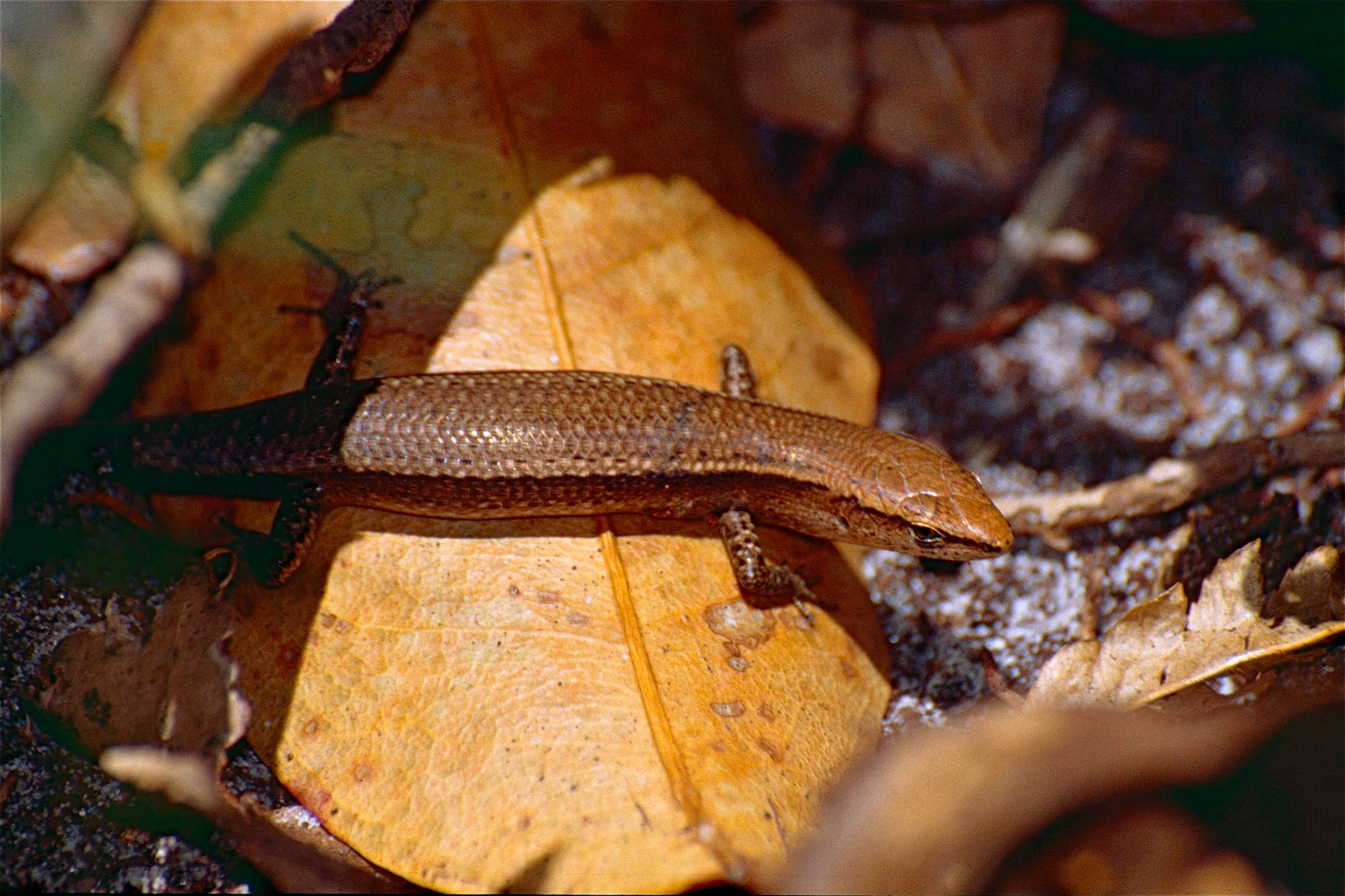

Conservation status
- Least Concern (IUCN 3.1)

Scientific classification
- Kingdom: Animalia
- Phylum: Chordata
- Class: Reptilia
- Order: Squamata
- Family: Scincidae
- Genus: Lampropholis
- Species: L. amicula

Binomial name
- Lampropholis amicula Ingram & Rawlinson, 1981

= Lampropholis amicula =

Species of lizard

Lampropholis amicula, the friendly sunskink, is a species of skink, a lizard in the family Scincidae. The species is endemic to Queensland and New South Wales in Australia.
