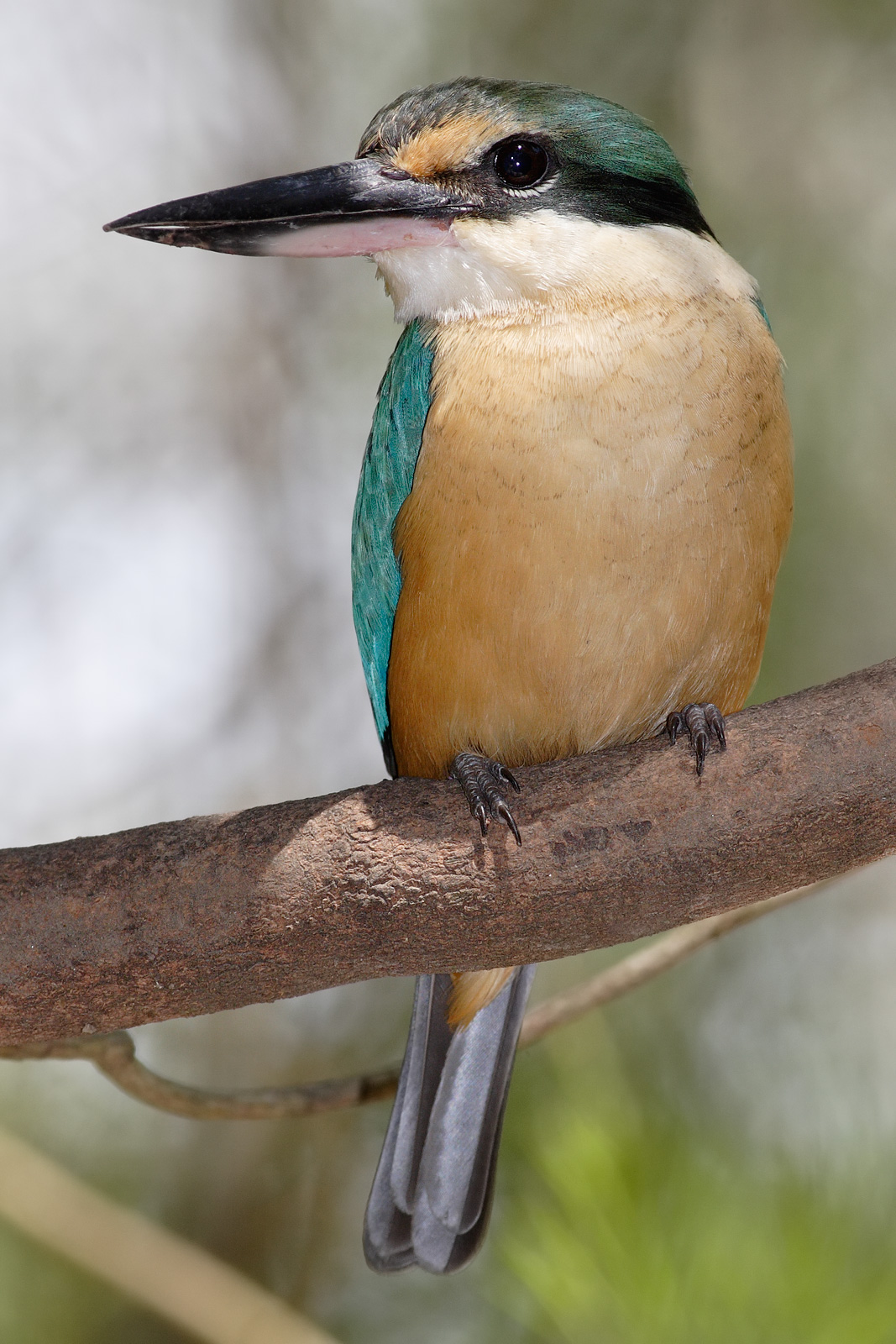
- Male

Conservation status
- Least Concern (IUCN 3.1)

Scientific classification
- Kingdom: Animalia
- Phylum: Chordata
- Class: Aves
- Order: Coraciiformes
- Family: Alcedinidae
- Subfamily: Halcyoninae
- Genus: Todiramphus
- Species: T. sanctus

Binomial name
- Todiramphus sanctus (Vigors & Horsfield, 1827)

Synonyms
- Halcyon sancta

= Sacred kingfisher =

Species of bird

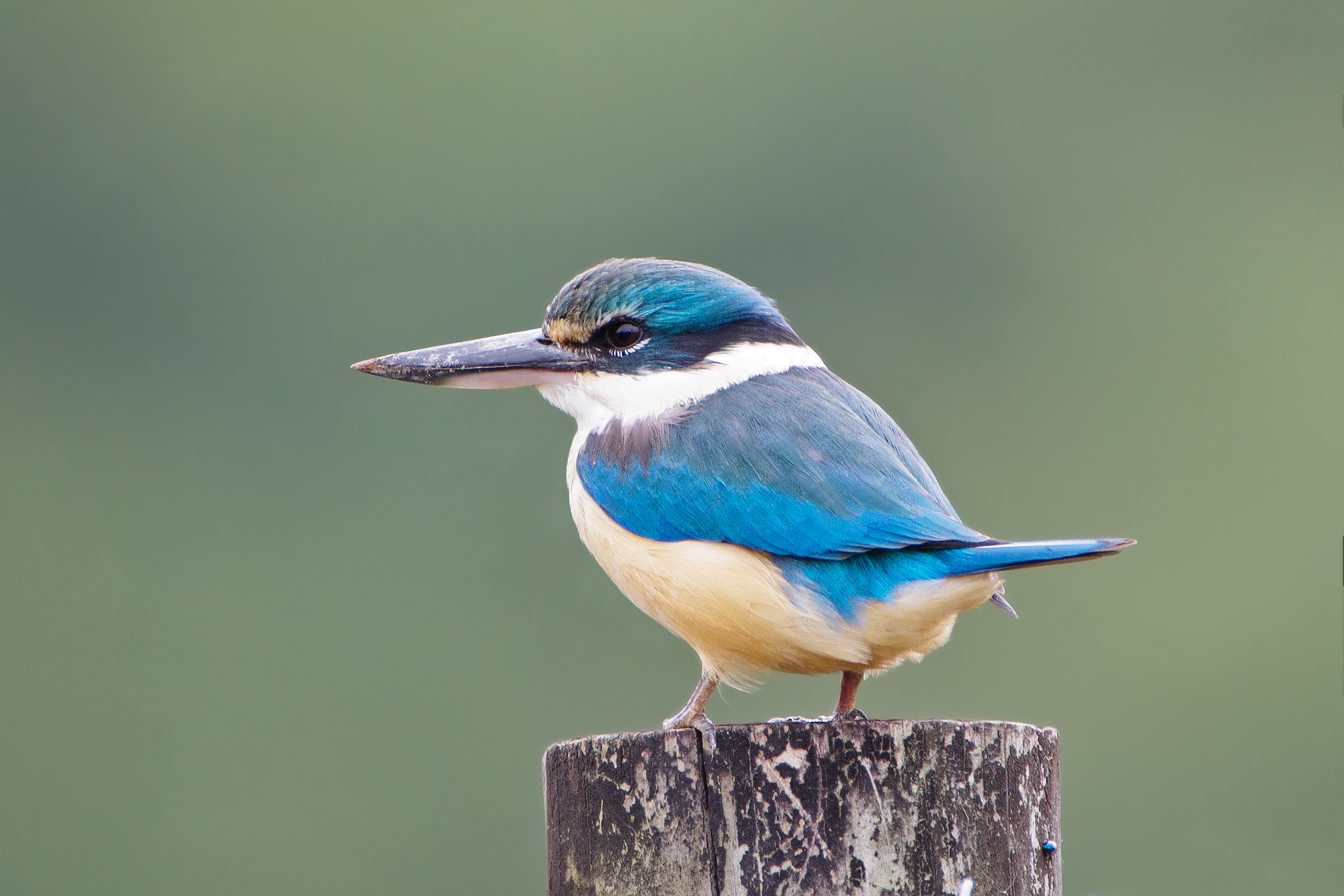
Wonga, Queensland, Australia

The sacred kingfisher (Todiramphus sanctus) is a medium-sized woodland kingfisher that inhabits mangroves, woodlands, forests and river valleys in Australia, New Zealand and other parts of the western Pacific.

== Taxonomy ==
The binomial name Halcyon sanctus was introduced by Nicholas Aylward Vigors and Thomas Horsfield in 1827 who described a sacred kingfisher zoological specimen from New Holland, Australia. Vigors and Horsfield compare it with Alcedo sacra described by Johann Friedrich Gmelin in 1788. Gmelin in turn based his description on John Latham's "Sacred King's Fisher" published in 1782. Latham described several varieties, one of which was illustrated in Arthur Phillip's The Voyage of Governor Phillip to Botany Bay published in 1789. The genus Halcyon was split and the sacred kingfisher was placed in the genus Todiramphus that had been erected by the French surgeon and naturalist René Lesson in 1827. The generic name is derived from the genus Todus (Brisson, 1760), 'tody' (a West Indian insectivorous bird) and Ancient Greek rhamphos (ῥάμφος), 'bill'. The specific epithet is the Latin sanctus 'sacred'.

Five subspecies are recognised:

- T. s. sanctus (Vigors & Horsfield, 1827) – Australia to eastern Solomon Islands, New Guinea and Indonesia
- T. s. vagans (Lesson, 1828) – New Zealand, Lord Howe Island and Kermadec Islands
- T. s. norfolkiensis (Tristram, 1885) – Norfolk Island
- T. s. canacorum (Brasil, L, 1916) – New Caledonia
- T. s. macmillani (Mayr, 1940) – Loyalty Islands

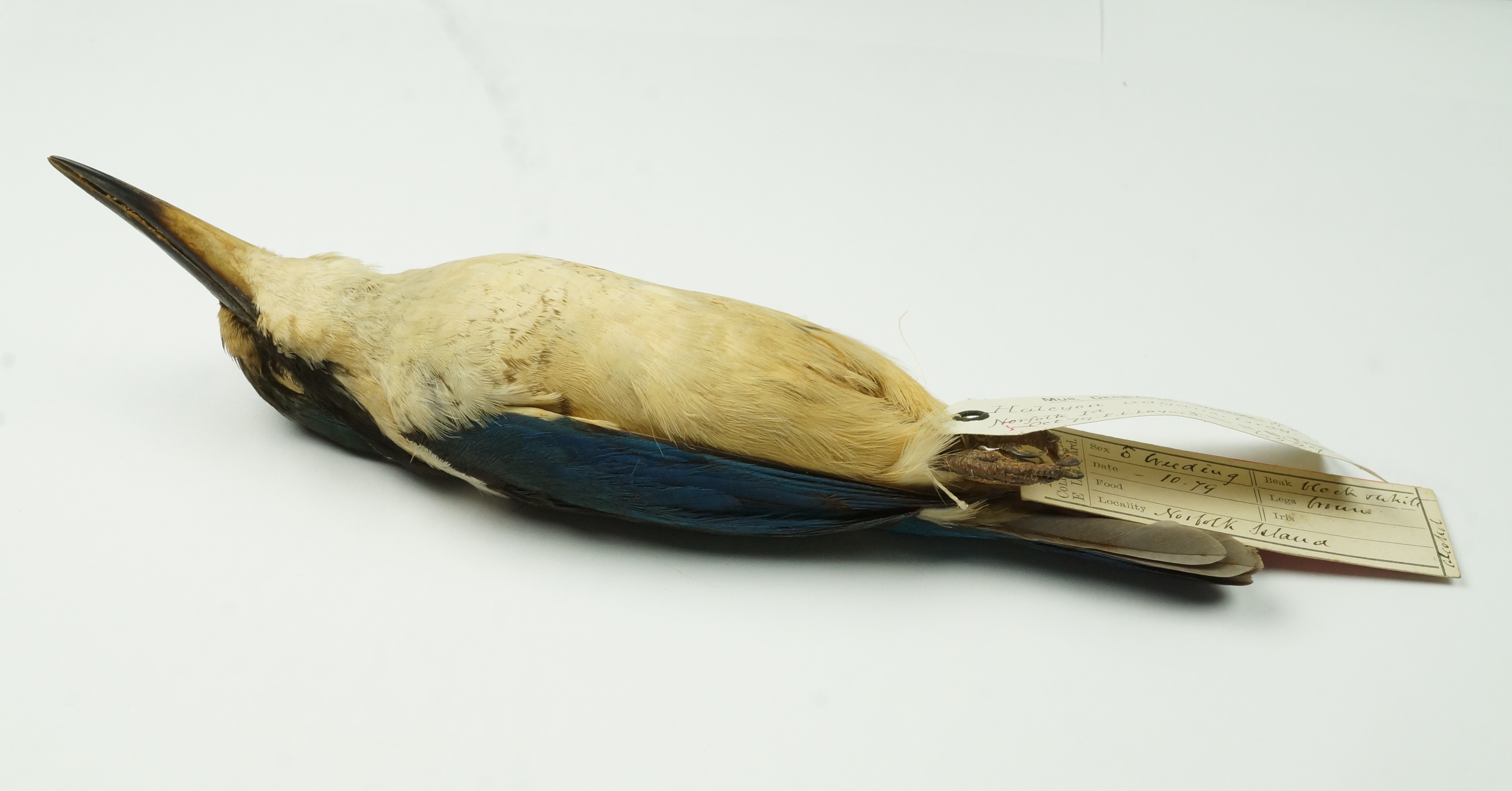
Holotype of Halcyon norfolkiensis Tristram (NML-VZ T6527) held at World Museum, National Museums Liverpool

The holotype of Halcyon norfolkiensis Tristram is an adult male held in the vertebrate zoology collection of National Museums Liverpool at World Museum, with accession number NML-VZ T6527. The specimen was collected in Norfolk Island in October 1879 by E. L. Layard and came to the Liverpool national collection through the purchase of Canon Henry Baker Tristram's collection by the museum in 1896.

== Etymology ==
The name "sacred kingfisher" can be traced back to Latham's 1782 description of the species and what he called the "Respected Kingsfisher" of the Friendly Isles (now Tonga), and the "Venerated Kingsfisher" of the Society Islands (both collared kingfishers). Latham claims, citing Parkinson's journals, that all three kingfishers were held in "superstitious veneration" by the natives on account of frequently inhabiting marae and burial grounds, and were not allowed to be taken or killed. Later sources claim Polynesians venerated it for having the power of control over the waves.

== Description ==
The sacred kingfisher is mostly blue-green to turquoise above with white underparts and collar feathers, a black mask and buff lores. Both sexes are similar, but females are usually greener, duller and less buff beneath, and juveniles have buff or mottled brown edges on the collar, underparts and upper-wing coverts. Adults are 20–23 cm (7.9–9.1 in) long. Males weigh 28–61 g (1.0–2.2 oz) and females 28–56 g (1.0–2.0 oz).

== Distribution and habitat ==
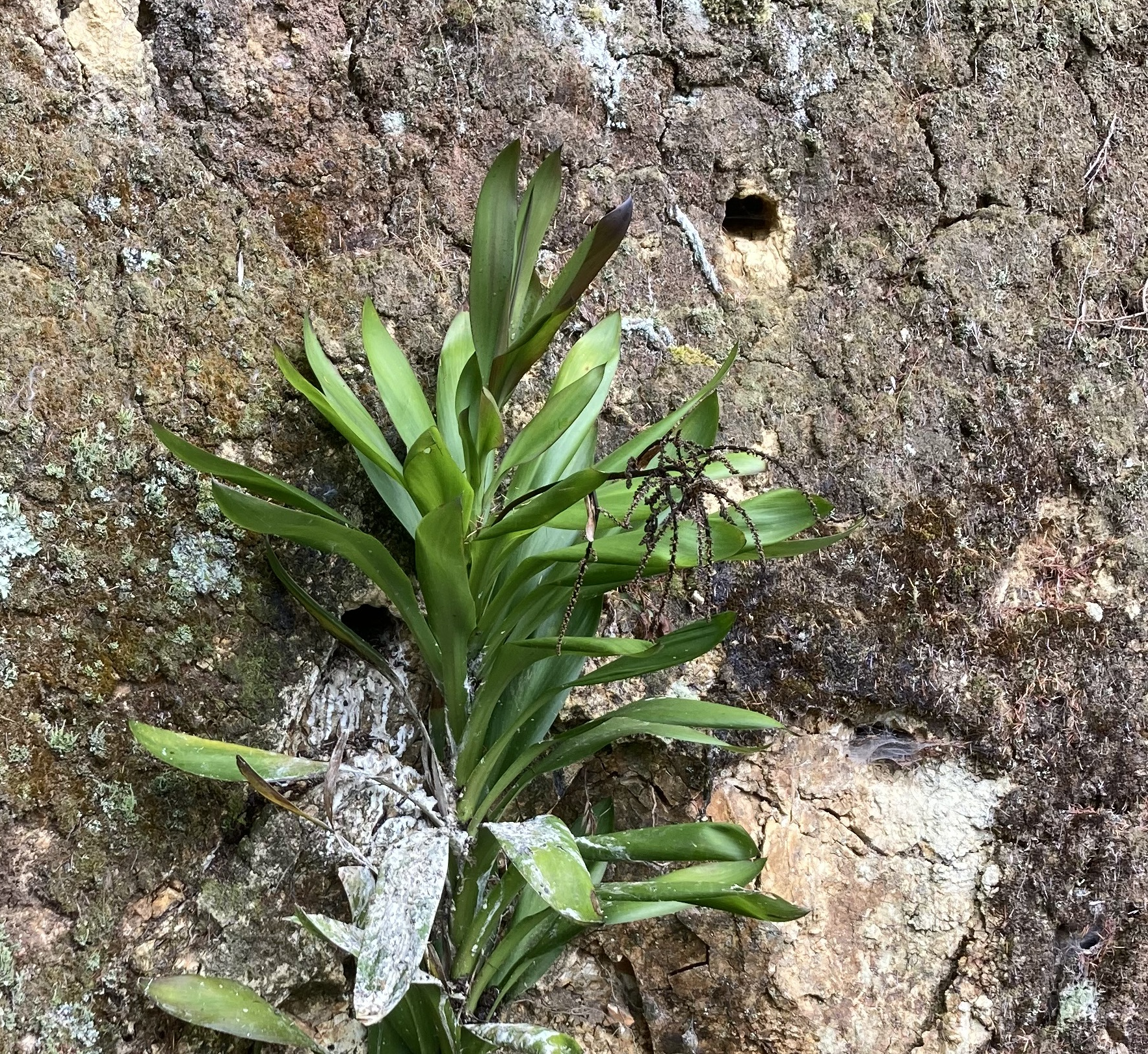
Two kingfisher burrows in a bank near Te Wahapu Inlet, near Russell, Bay of Islands, New Zealand

The sacred kingfisher is distributed in Australia, New Zealand, Lord Howe Island, Norfolk Island, New Guinea, eastern Indonesia, much of northern and western Melanesia, and the Kermadec Islands. This species breeds throughout much of Australia (except the dry interior), New Zealand, New Caledonia and locally, New Guinea. Populations in the southern two-thirds of Australia migrate northwards at the end of the breeding season to New Guinea, east to the eastern Solomon Islands and west to Indonesia becoming uncommon to very sparse westwards to Sumatra. Birds move south again to Australia in August and September. It has also occurred as a vagrant on Christmas Island in the Indian Ocean, Malaysia, the Marshall Islands, the Federated States of Micronesia, and Nauru. A pair were spotted in Pampanga, Philippines in April / May 2016.

In Australia, it inhabits open eucalypt forests, melaleuca swamps, mangroves, mudflats, wetlands and river or lake margins, farmland, parks and gardens. In New Zealand, T. sanctus vagans shows altitudinal migration, with post-breeding movement from higher altitudes to the coast and also from forest to coast and open lands.

== Behaviour and ecology ==
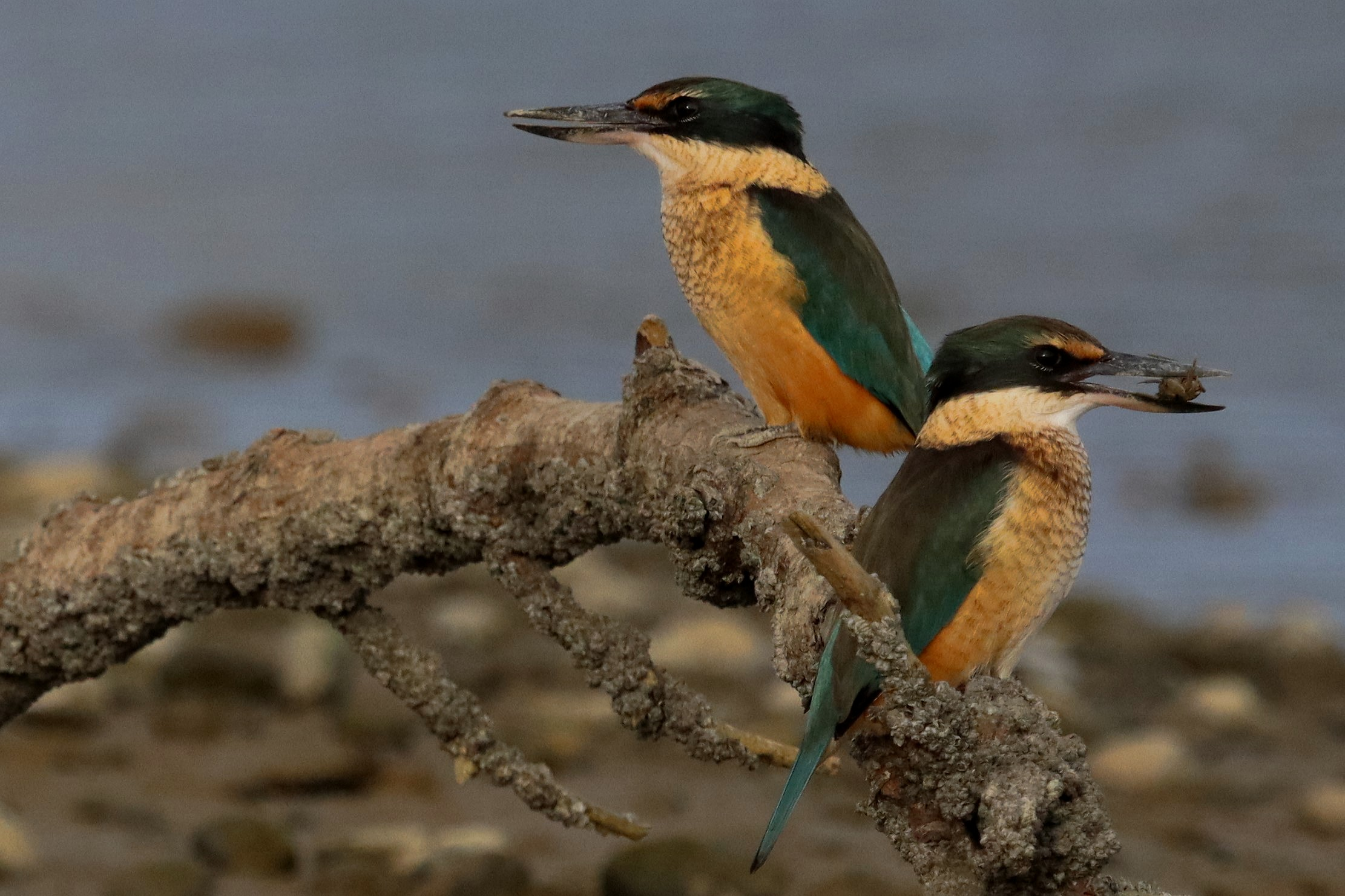
Kingfishers feeding at Pauatahanui Inlet

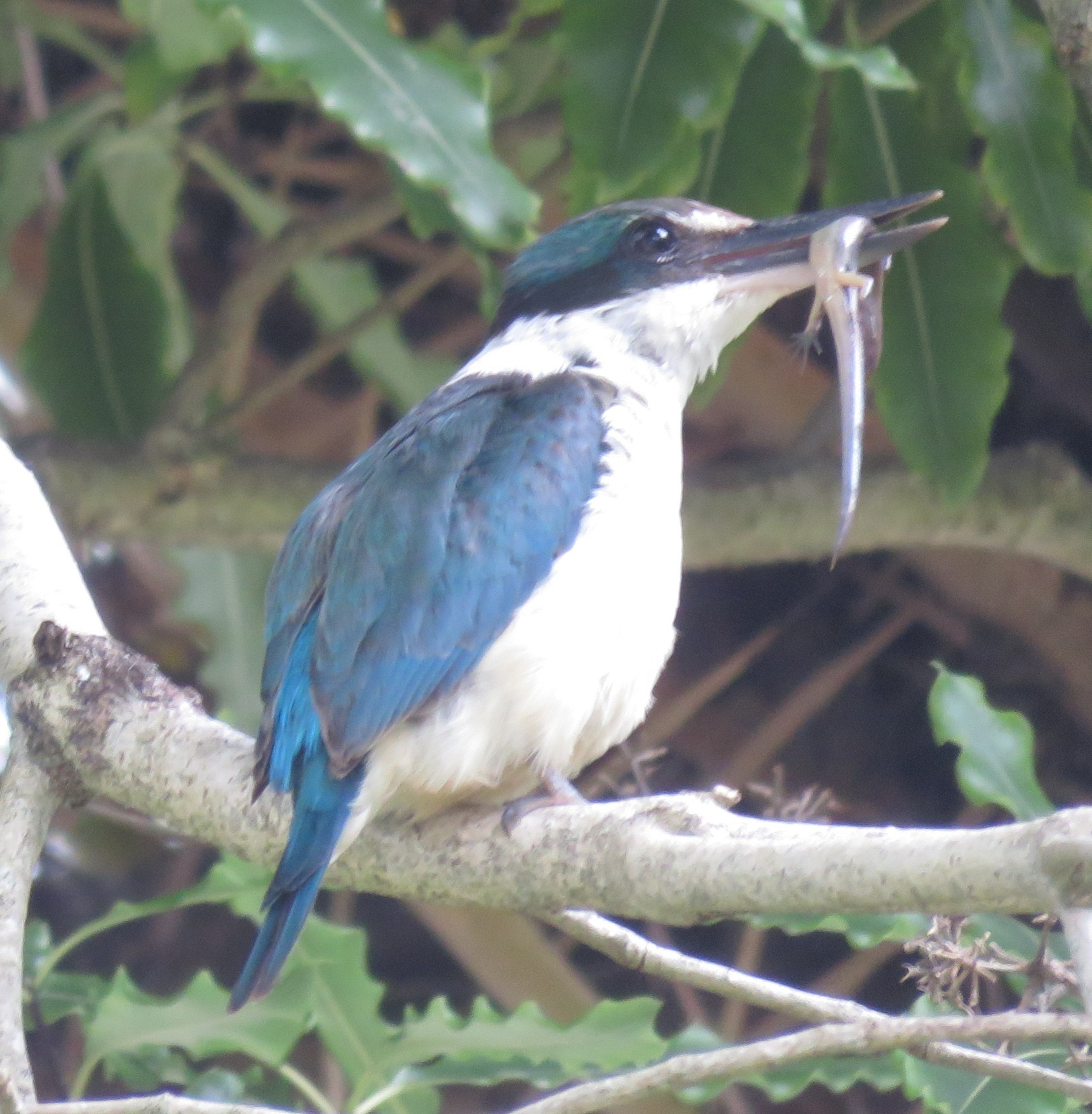
T. s. vagans eating a dark-flecked garden sunskink

=== Feeding ===
The sacred kingfisher feeds on a wide variety of invertebrates (particularly insects and spiders), small crustaceans, fish (infrequently), frogs, small rodents and reptiles, and there are a few reports of them eating finches and other small birds. Usually, the sacred kingfisher will sit on a low branch and wait for prey to pass by. It swoops down to grab the prey by briefly landing (sally-pounce) or hovering (sally-strike), and then returns to its perch to eat its catch by beating and swallowing.

=== Breeding ===
The breeding season is from August to March (mostly September to January), often with two broods. Once a pair of birds has mated, both members of the pair dig the nest; a burrow in a river bank, a hollow in a large branch or a termite mound are prime examples of nest location. The female lays a clutch of 3 to 6 glossy white, rounded eggs, measuring 25 mm × 22 mm (0.98 in × 0.87 in), which are incubated for 17–18 days by both parents (mainly female). Both parents (and possibly helpers) feed the nestlings for up to 4 weeks, and for a further 7–10 days after fledging.

== Conservation ==
The sacred kingfisher has a wide distribution and the population trend is increasing, and it is classed as least concern on the IUCN Red List.

== In culture ==
In New Zealand, the sacred kingfisher is also known by the Māori-language name kōtare (rendered as Ghotarré by Latham in 1782). The Yuwaalaraay people of northern New South Wales use the name bunduun to refer to this species.
