= Lampropholis robertsi =

Conservation status
- Least Concern (IUCN 3.1)

Scientific classification
- Kingdom: Animalia
- Phylum: Chordata
- Class: Reptilia
- Order: Squamata
- Family: Scincidae
- Genus: Lampropholis
- Species: L. robertsi

Binomial name
- Lampropholis robertsi Ingram, 1991

Species of lizard

Lampropholis robertsi, the grey-bellied sunskink, is a species of skink, a lizard in the family Scincidae. The species is endemic to Queensland in Australia.
