= Lampropholis colossus =

Conservation status
- Data Deficient (IUCN 3.1)

Scientific classification
- Kingdom: Animalia
- Phylum: Chordata
- Class: Reptilia
- Order: Squamata
- Family: Scincidae
- Genus: Lampropholis
- Species: L. colossus

Binomial name
- Lampropholis colossus Ingram, 1991

Species of lizard

Lampropholis colossus, the Bunya sunskink, is a species of skink, a lizard in the family Scincidae. The species is endemic to Queensland in Australia.
