= List of reptiles of Australia =

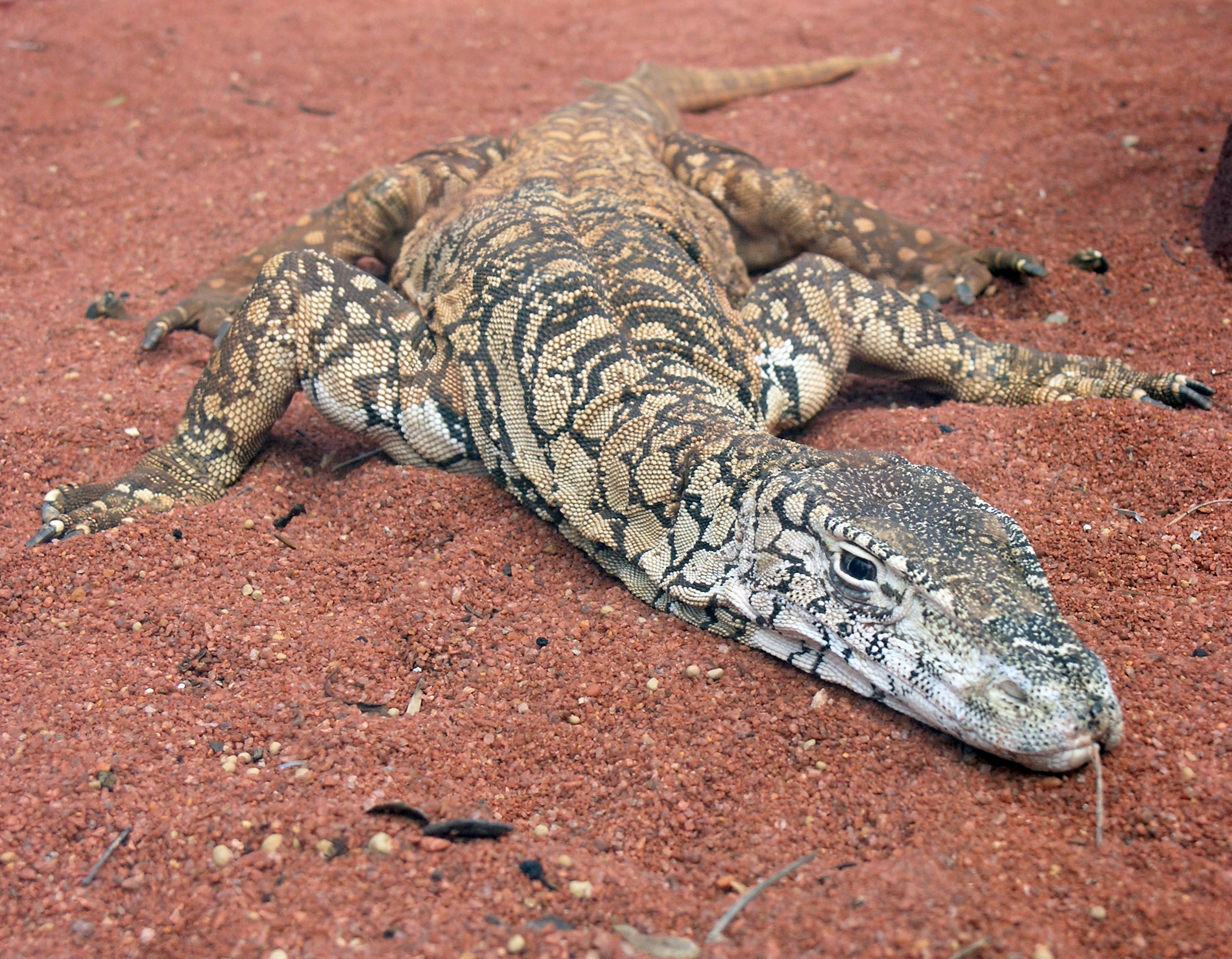
The perentie (Varanus giganteus) is Australia's largest lizard.

The non-avian reptiles of Australia are a diverse group of animals, widely distributed across the continent. Three of the four reptile orders are represented: Testudines, Squamata and Crocodilia. The only missing extant order is Sphenodontia, containing the tuataras, which are endemic to New Zealand. Australia has over 860 species, a large number in comparison to other continents; for example, North America's total is about 280. The most species-rich group is Squamata, the snakes and lizards. They are especially diverse in the arid areas of Australia, where other fauna are scarcer. Spinifex grass is a major habitat which allows them to remain in a relatively cool, moist area.

Australia has a large array of reptiles which can be dangerous to humans. The world's largest reptile, the saltwater crocodile (Crocodylus porosus), is native to the continent's north coastal area.

== Australian reptile families ==
Testudines – 4 families
| Family | Common names | Example species | Example photo |
| Cheloniidae | Sea turtles | Green sea turtle (Chelonia mydas) | |
| Dermochelyidae | Leatherback sea turtle | Leatherback sea turtle (Dermochelys coriacea) | |
| Chelidae | Austro-American side-necked turtles | Common snakeneck turtle (Chelodina longicollis) | |
| Carettochelyidae | Pig-nosed turtle | Pig-nosed turtle (Carettochelys insculpta) | |
Squamata – 12 families
| Family | Common names | Example species | Example photo |
| Gekkonidae | Geckos | Thick-tailed gecko (Underwoodisaurus milii) | |
| Pygopodidae | Legless lizards | Burton's legless-lizard (Lialis burtonis) | |
| Agamidae | dragon lizards | Eastern bearded dragon (Pogona barbata) | |
| Varanidae | Monitors or goannas | Lace monitor (Varanus varius) | |
| Scincidae | Skinks | Western blue-tongued skink (Tiliqua occipitalis) | |
| Typhlopidae | Blind snakes | Proximus blind snake (Ramphotyphlops proximus) | - |
| Pythonidae | Pythons | Green tree python (Morelia viridis) | |
| Colubridae | Colubrid snakes | Brown tree snake (Boiga irregularis) | |
| Elapidae | - | Common death adder (Acanthophis antarcticus) | |
| Hydrophiidae | Sea snakes | - | - |
| Laticaudidae | Sea kraits | - | - |
| Acrochordidae | File snakes | Arafura file snake (Acrochordus arafurae) | |
Crocodilia – 1 family
| Family | Common names | Example species | Example photo |
| Crocodylidae | Crocodiles | Freshwater crocodile (Crocodylus johnstoni) | |

== See also ==
- List of reptiles of Tasmania
- List of reptiles of Western Australia
- List of Australian and Antarctic dinosaurs
