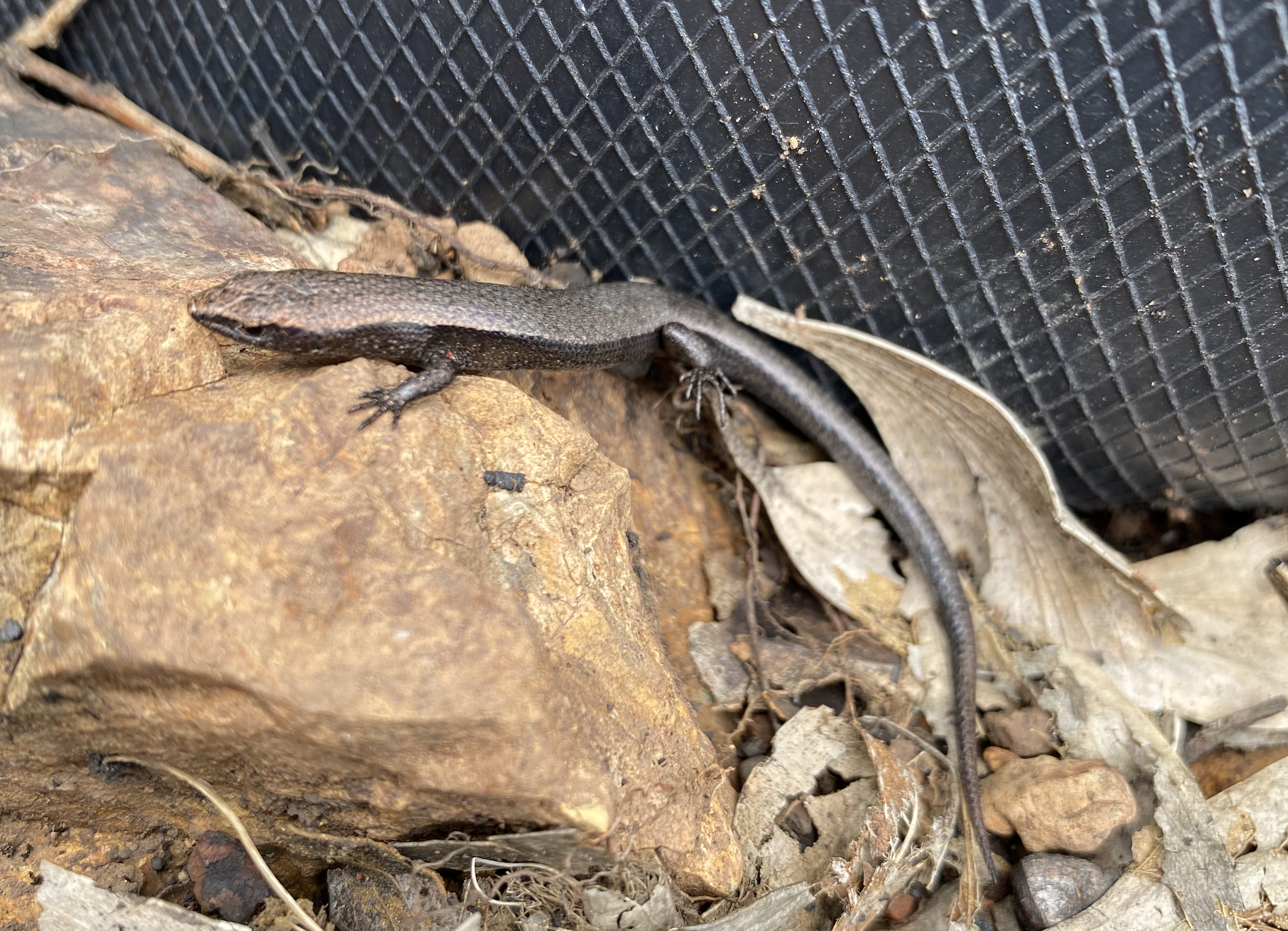

Conservation status
- Least Concern (IUCN 3.1)

Scientific classification
- Kingdom: Animalia
- Phylum: Chordata
- Class: Reptilia
- Order: Squamata
- Family: Scincidae
- Genus: Carinascincus
- Species: C. coventryi

Binomial name
- Carinascincus coventryi (Rawlinson, 1975)

Synonyms
- Leiolopisma coventryi Rawlinson, 1975; Niveoscincus coventryi — Hutchinson et al., 1990; Pseudemoia coventryi — Frank & Ramus, 1995; Harrisoniascincus coventryi — Greer, 2005; Carinascincus coventryi — Couper et al., 2006

= Carinascincus coventryi =

Species of lizard

Carinascincus coventryi, also known commonly as Coventry's window-eyed skink and the southern forest cool-skink, is a species of lizard in the subfamily Eugongylinae of the family Scincidae. The species is endemic to Australia.

== Etymology ==
The specific name, coventryi, is in honor of Australian herpetologist Albert John Coventry.

== Geographic range ==
Carinascincus coventryi is found in the Australian states of Victoria and southern New South Wales.

== Habitat ==
The preferred natural habitat of Carinascincus coventryi is forest, at altitudes of 600–1,500 m (2,000–4,900 ft).

== Description ==
Carinascincus coventryi may attain a snout-to-vent length (SVL) of 5 cm (2.0 in), with a long tail which is about one and a third times SVL.

== Behavior ==
Carinascincus coventryi is terrestrial.

== Reproduction ==
Carinascincus coventryi is viviparous.
