= Lampropholis caligula =

Conservation status
- Least Concern (IUCN 3.1)

Scientific classification
- Kingdom: Animalia
- Phylum: Chordata
- Class: Reptilia
- Order: Squamata
- Family: Scincidae
- Genus: Lampropholis
- Species: L. caligula

Binomial name
- Lampropholis caligula Ingram & Rawlinson, 1981

Species of lizard

Lampropholis caligula, also known commonly as the montane sunskink or the montane sun skink, is a species of lizard in the family Scincidae. The species is endemic to New South Wales in Australia.

== Etymology ==
The specific name, caligula, refers to the Roman emperor, Caligula.

== Habitat ==
The preferred natural habitats of L. caligula are forest, shrubland, and freshwater wetlands.

== Reproduction ==
L. caligula is oviparous.
