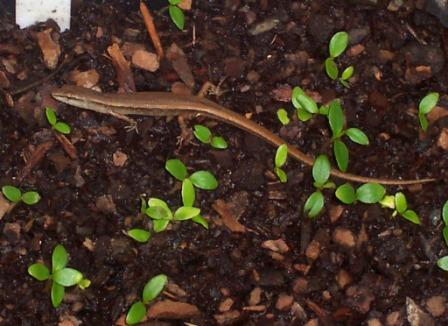

Conservation status
- Least Concern (IUCN 3.1)

Scientific classification
- Kingdom: Animalia
- Phylum: Chordata
- Class: Reptilia
- Order: Squamata
- Family: Scincidae
- Genus: Lampropholis
- Species: L. delicata

Binomial name
- Lampropholis delicata (De Vis, 1888)

= Lampropholis delicata =

Species of lizard

Lampropholis delicata, the delicate skink, dark-flecked garden sun skink, garden skink, delicate garden skink, rainbow skink or plague skink, or the metallic skink is native to Australia and invasive in New Zealand and Hawaii where it is commonly found in gardens. The species is known for their color dimorphism between males and females; striped morphs and non-striped morphs exist in this species, however the stripe is less pronounced in males. This species' diet consists of a wide range of prey, such as spiders, bees, larvae, and termites. Mating occurs in the late summer and generally one clutch of 2 to 4 eggs are laid per year by each female.

== Description and identification ==
The delicate skink is more common in suburban gardens than in adjacent native bushland. It has a moderate body with a medium length, slender tail. Its scales are smooth. The back and sides are greyish-brown to rich brown, often with darker and paler flecks. A narrow yellowish-brown stripe is usually present on the outer edge of the back. The species can also have two distinct forms: a prominent white stripe and a less prominent white stripe. This dimorphism is not strictly distinguished by gender.

Lampropholis delicata were accidentally introduced into Lord Howe Island, a remote oceanic island between Australia and New Zealand, in the 1980s and subsequently introduced into the Hawaiian islands. Upon introduction, these lizards have rapidly spread themselves across the islands. On Lord Howe Island specifically, they reside in low-elevation vegetation communities. They are a diurnal species whose activity varies seasonally, in which activity peaks during the months of November and December. Sexual dimorphism is present in L. delicata, in which males have broader, longer heads and females have larger abdomen and body sizes. Female reproduction takes place in the spring season and more commonly in the late summer, ranging between the months of September and February. A positive correlation exists between the clutch size and body size of the female, and although it is common for clutch sizes to vary between 1 and 7 eggs, the average clutch size is between 2 and 4. Communal egg nests are also common, with anywhere between 11 and over 200 eggs. Tail loss and subsequent regeneration occurs frequently with these lizards but is observed most commonly in females and adults.

== Physiology ==
=== Autotomy and spinal cord regeneration ===
Autotomy is the ability for organisms, such as L. delicata, to intentionally shed an appendage or limb, and this ability has independently evolved in many vertebrates such as other reptiles, fish, and amphibians. Caudal autotomy has developed as a last resort anti-predator behavior, when other anti-predator behaviors like fleeing and crypsis fail. By detaching their tails, lizards are able to flee from their predators quicker, while the thrashing of the detached tails post-autotomy serves to distract the predator and allow the lizard to successfully escape. These lizards are able to shed their tail at any point along the length of it, as most of their caudal vertebrae have fracture planes. Although the immediate survival benefits are evident, the subsequent lack of a tail hinders locomotion, interferes with habitat use and activity, and increases an individual's susceptibility to future encounters with predators. After losing their tails, L. delicata cannot utilize their caudal autotomy capabilities as a defense strategy again until their tail regrows to a sufficient length. Furthermore, the benefits of a long tail include increased stride lengths, which become significantly smaller with the loss of their tail, thus hindering locomotor performance and enhancing future predation risks. The tails also serve as fat reserves, so the length of the tail discarded correlates to the amount of energy storage lost due to autotomy. Additionally, because lizards become less active after autotomy, they increase the amount of time spent in shelters or microhabitats, which may decrease their vulnerability to predators in the short term, but impacts their foraging ability, thermoregulatory mannerisms, and tail regeneration efficiency.

Biological evidence suggests that tail regrowth is stimulated by a regenerating spinal cord. These lizards' spinal cords consist primarily of ependymal cells that group around a tubular central canal containing cerebrospinal fluid. Axons are interspersed between these ependymal cells and encased in collagenous leptomeninges, and although their exact origin is unknown, it is hypothesized that the axons come from differentiated cells in the regenerate or from neuronal somata in the tail stump. Within the spinal cords of regenerating tails, specialized types of cells known as cerebral spinal fluid contacting neurons (CSFCN) have been observed, and they grow in a pear-like shape and are about the size of or bigger than their neighboring ependymal cells. Some distinct biomolecular features of CSFCNs include the mitochondria with few tube-like invaginations and the network of microtubules. Fingerlike luminal protrusions, large amounts of cytoskeletal elements, and the contact between fingerlike projections of receptor cell dendrites and Reissner fibres allow for the regeneration of secretory, mechanical, and sensory functions of the tail respectively.

== Habitat and distribution ==
Lampropholis delicata is a skink of the subfamily Lygosominae, originally from Eastern Australia. Accidentally introduced and invasive in New Zealand, Hawaii, and Lord Howe Island.

=== Phylogeographic divergence in eastern Australia ===
As a result of topographic and dry habitat barriers, Lampropholis delicata have evolved to demonstrate a complex mosaic of non-overlapping, geographically oriented clades and subclades. Since the accidental introduction of L. delicata into eastern Australian habitats, many biogeographic barriers and climatic oscillations have contributed to the evolutionary history of these lizards. They reside over a vast array of moist habitats, including woodland and heaths, sclerophyll forests, and rainforests, while also making appearances in suburban gardens near the eastern coast. L. delicata can be classified into nine main clades, which diverged during the late Miocene through Pliocene epochs. This divergence correlates to a period of a drying climate in the rainforest habitats, which restricted the rainforests to a series of disjunct remnants. L. delicata, which resides on the fringes of the rainforest, thus probably also encountered similar fragmentation and reduction. Dry habitat corridors suggest that drier vegetation served as effective barriers to enable these mesic-adapted lizards to disperse, and high elevation areas—which are patchy remnants of the moist rainforests—located more inland have also created such geographic isolation, as they offer a wetter and cooler refuge for these lizards. Additionally, the phylogeographic breaks demonstrated by L. delicata along with many other lizard species is believed to be caused by cycles of marine inundation experienced by the area since the Miocene epoch.

== Behavior ==
=== Diet and foraging behavior ===
Lampropholis delicata can be classified as diurnal, terrestrial, arthropod feeders, and they consume a wide range of prey. An in depth analysis of L. delicata gut samples—taken from their foregut, hindgut, and stomach—reveals the wide variety of prey taxa and size classes incorporated into their diets. These gut samples are taken from L. delicata that reside in the Mumbulla State Forest, a region with a vast history of fires and logging. As a result of intense fires, several canopies and ground vegetation have ceased to sustain the lizard population, resulting in a primarily carnivorous diet. L. delicata primarily consumes spiders, insects, snails, and crustaceans. Gut analysis after a major fire in 1980 reveals that these lizards ate limited amounts of invertebrates, and they had a preference for bees, wasps, and springtails over beetles, termites, and ants relative to their related species L. guichenoti, which also reside in the Mumbulla State Forest.

L. delicata are characterized as general feeders, and their prey can be described as aerial and arboreal (i.e. bugs, beetles), slow-moving (i.e. larvae), concentrated (i.e. termites, ants), concealed (i.e. crickets, cockroaches), and active (i.e. spiders). These lizards demonstrate foraging behavior and employ "active foraging" and "sit-and-wait" strategies to capture their prey. Because their environment is prone to fires and droughts, L. delicata have adapted flexibility into their foraging ecology. They practice opportunistic foraging in that they consume a wide variety of prey and adapt to whatever food becomes available, rather than following a foraging pattern and consuming similar prey. As a result of droughts, arthropods become less abundant; however, L. delicata are not dependent on resident invertebrates, like those that reside in litters, and instead forage after a broader range of insects spanning both aerial-arboreal invertebrates and ground-dwelling invertebrates.

=== Microhabitat selection ===
With selecting a habitat, animals must consider the cost and benefit trade-offs of acquiring shelter and food while evading competitors and predators. Because lizards are ectothermic, thermal conditions and subsequent impacts on physiological performance must also be taken into consideration for habitat selection. Thus deciding the degree of exposure or insulation, canopy or ground cover, structure of litter layer, or amount of grasses, forbs, rocks, and woody debris within the shelter remain prevalent considerations for lizard habitats. For small lizards like L. delicata, the structure of the leaf litter layer influences thermoregulation, feeding, and refuge seeking, making it an influential factor in microhabitat selection.

Experimental evidence suggests that L. delicata prefer leaf litters to bare substrate, with more nuanced preferences for different types of leaves, as they adjust the structure, depth, and distribution of their litter layer accordingly. Generally, these lizards select more open structures. Such open structure makes thermoregulation more effective, as lizard individuals can move into different positions within their habitat to avoid overheating or raise their temperature to more optimal levels. Achieving optimum temperature levels influences their efficiency in avoiding predators and capturing prey, thus making open habitats conducive to many other behavioral characteristics. Furthermore, open litters allow for more effective foraging movements and also provide lizards with more access points and space to move, which is necessary when accessing refuge for predator avoidance. The abundance of L. delicata in an area may also be influenced by habitat modifications that vary the structure of their litter layers.

== Reproduction and life cycle ==
Although the biological mechanisms of reproductive cycles between male and female L. delicata lizards differ, they align seasonally such that mating can occur in the late summer. Typically, these lizards produce a single clutch per year of about two to four eggs. In a study analyzing the reproductive cycles in male and female L. delicata over a two-year period, it has been found that, in males, the testes contain very few mature sperm during the late autumn and winter months, and during this period, spermatogonia are predominantly present as germ cells while the seminiferous tubules are at their smallest in diameter. However, spermatogenesis begins during the early spring months, allowing for the development of primary and secondary spermatocytes. Nearing the end of September, mature sperm will pack the now expanded seminiferous tubules, and the sperm will deplete during the months of October and November. In the summer, a second wave of spermatogenesis persists to produce more mature sperm during February, which depletes from the seminiferous tubules in spring and then again during autumn presumably for mating reasons, although only mating during the late summer has been observed.

In females, the autumn and winter months between February and July are defined by quiescent ovaries, and only during the late winter and spring months between August and October, follicles begin growing into notable sizes. In October or November, one or two follicles per ovary become vitellogenic and ovulated. After ovulation, the corpora lutea forms and maintains until oviposition occurs about a month later. Following ovulation, many other growing follicles become vitellogenic, although they may not ovulate and may regress after the mating period during the late summer. In females, many of these ovarian events parallel ovarian weights.

Although growing oocytes are not commonly found in young adult females, young adult males of all ages undergo spermatogenesis. Observation of L. delicata suggests that they produce no more than one clutch per season; however, some evidence suggests that young female lizards may produce a clutch in the season following their birth, which aligns with male lizards' ability to mate during both the spring and late summer. Though temperature and photoperiod are hypothesized to induce reproductive activity in lizards, more evidence suggests the influence of rain patterns on lizard reproduction cycles. With lower annual rainfall, annual vegetation productivity, and arthropod availability, food becomes relatively scarce for these lizards. As a result, it may influence the follicular development in female lizards, in particular the vitellogenesis cycle, although decreased rainfall may be insufficient to influence male testicular patterns.

Female Lampropholis delicata lizards tend to reproduce in the spring and summer seasons (September–February). It was found that there is a positive relationship between body size and clutch size. Clutch size typically ranges between 1 and 7 (mean 3.4). Communal egg nests (11–200+ eggs) are common.

== Color dimorphism ==
Individuals of the Lampropholis delicata species have a distinct color dimorphism. As of now, two morphs are known: a prominent white stripe and absence of the stripe along the lateral to midsection of the body. However, expression of the stripe is reduced in males, so that the stripe in males is dull compared to striped females. The continuation of each morph is often linked to its fitness advantage in crypsis but varies for each sex and temperature exposure. The presence of the stripe can confer a fitness advantage in females but in males the coloration may cause exposure to predation therefore males are far more commonly plain than striped and their stripe is less distinct. However the ultimate cause of this color dimorphism is not entirely conclusive for each sex but may be attributed geographical distribution, natural barriers, habitat preference, and sexual selection.

Since the Lampropholis delicata species is not native to the area in which they are found, it is possible that the resulting morphs are caused by the exposure to a new environment and climate as this particular species' activity level is temperature dependent. The most active males are found in lower temperature microhabitats and display a higher number of individuals with indistinct stripes. This could be a result of anti-predation tactics. Females of this species do not display the same activity level as their male counterparts so the number of females with the less distinct morphs remain lower. Sexual selection also plays a role on the continuation of this dimorphism because females seem to choose the males with higher fitness traits, in this case they favor the highly active less distinct striped males.

Aside from the variation in climate, Eastern Australia also provides different ground cover substrates as potential habitats. The species prefers an open substrate environment because the ground cover and loose leaf litter allows for thermoregulation, protection and optimal foraging conditions. Females and males remain sheltered in the leaf litter and their cryptic coloration adds an additional camouflage element but it is inconclusive as to whether the habitat distribution directly caused the color dimorphism.

Environmental factors greatly influence the change within the Lampropholis delicata species and continue to preserve each distinct variation. These polymorphisms have the potential to greatly affect survival in each niche, especially because the Lampropholis delicata is an invasive species, creating more need for adaptations.

== Predation ==
The predation of small reptiles and amphibians by terrestrial arthropods is very common in Australia, more so than other continents. More specifically, small lizards and snakes commonly become entangled in webs of female red-back spiders, or Latrodectus hasseltii. A typical account of predation involves a dead adult L. delicata entangled in the usually irregular web of a mature adult female L. hasseltii. If the lizards' tails are not autotomised, an angular point in the curved tail may suggest a partial break around the mid-tail level. Commonly, rigor mortis is present in these lizards.

== Pest status ==
Known in New Zealand as "rainbow skink", or more recently "plague skink", it was accidentally introduced in the early 1960s presumably as eggs in garden plant potting mix and is extremely common in the top third of the North Island, found in several other parts of the North Island, and also in the top of the South Island around Blenheim. Considered an invasive species as it competes with native lizards for food and habitat. High populations densities of this introduced skink may also impact native lizard species by artificially increasing the population of lizard-focused predators such as the sacred kingfisher.

Called "metallic skink" in Hawaii where it was accidentally introduced in the early 1900s, it was misidentified as Lygosoma metallicum and has since been reclassified as Lampropholis delicata. It is reportedly now the most numerous skink on the main Hawaiian Islands.

It was accidentally introduced to Lord Howe Island in the 80s, where it quickly colonised the whole island.

=== L. delicata in Hawaii ===
Lampropholis delicata was accidentally imported to the Hawaiian islands from Australia around the 1900s via shipments of plant materials and lumber. It was noted as an unreported specimen taken on the Oahu island and identified as a Lipinia noctua at that time, then later reclassified as Lygosomoa metallicum (the metallic skink) because of its physical appearance. L. Metallicum does not occur in Hawaii, however, and is instead a misidentification of L. delicata. L. delicata are most common on the Oahu island but are also present on other islands in Hawaii, including the main island and Kauai. These lizards bear great importance in Hawaiian zoogeography because they have established high-altitude records amidst all the Hawaiian reptiles at 1220 meters on the Kauai island and 1130 meters on the main island. In fact, these lizards prefer and thrive at much higher and wetter altitudes in Hawaii and other species of lizards. Because these lizards are semi-mountainous and found in dry to wet sclerophyll forests, they are distributed throughout the dry lowland and wet upland.

The three populations of L. delicata found on the main island, Oahu, and Kauai differ with respect to their average body length and in the numbers of eggs they produce. Female lizards at a sexually mature age are larger on the big island and Kauai relative to those on Oahu. The Oahu females average about 38.6 millimeters in body length while those from the main island and Kauai average a length of 41.2 millimeters and 41.8 millimeters respectively. It is theorized that Oahu females grow to a relatively smaller body size because of their higher population densities, thus creating competition amongst individuals for food and space availability. Competition against other species might also be a possibility, and the inter and intraspecific competition experienced by Oahu females may also serve to explain the reduced egg production, as generally body size correlates to clutch size (smaller individuals with less internal body capacity lay fewer eggs than larger individuals). As such, Oahu females have a lower average number of eggs per clutch relative to the sexually mature female lizards on the main island and Kauai. Female lizards from Oahu have an average of 2.9 eggs, while the main island females average 4.7 eggs per clutch and Kauai females average 4.1 eggs per clutch.

== Gallery ==
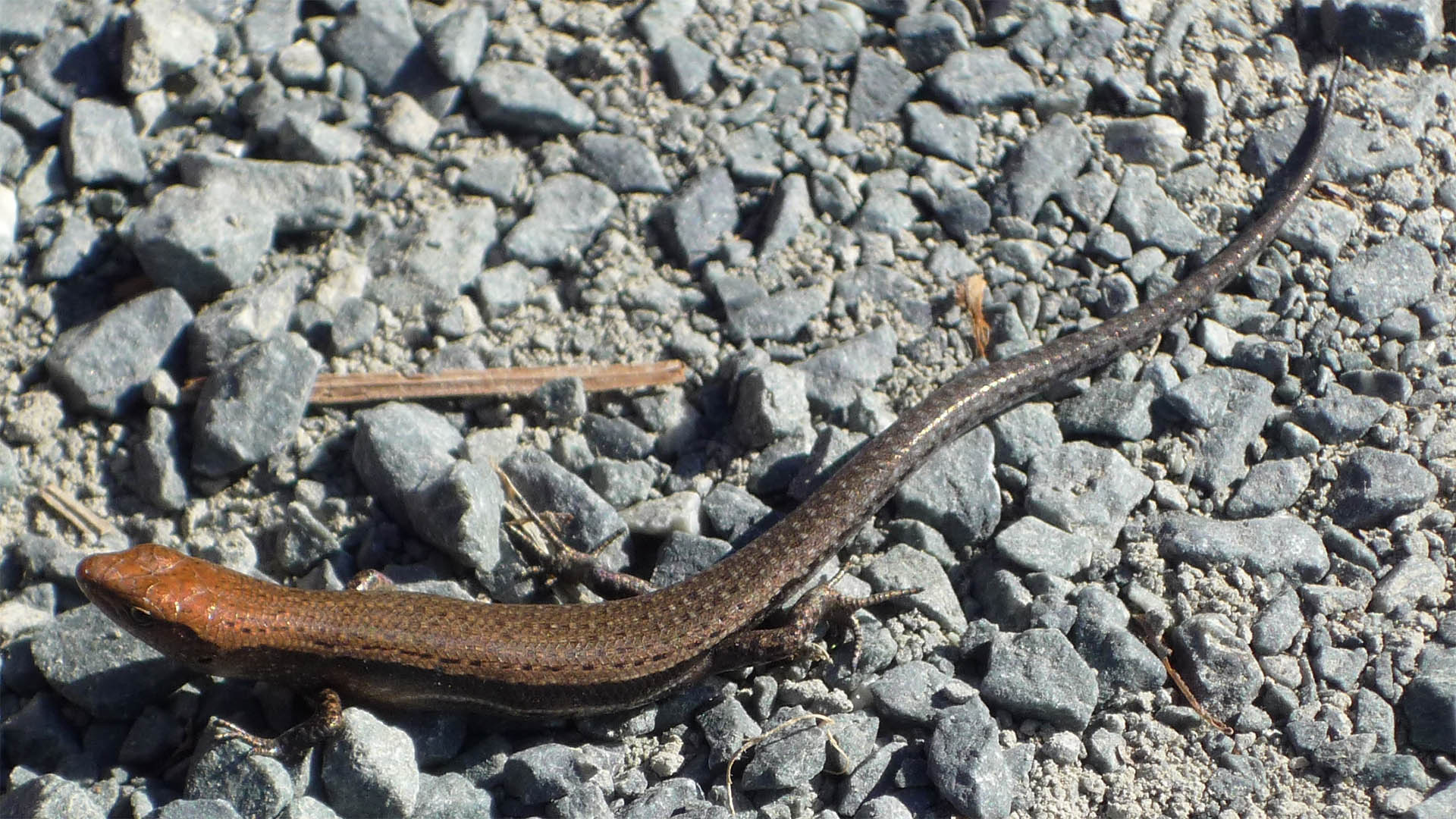
Naturalised rainbow skink in Raglan, New Zealand

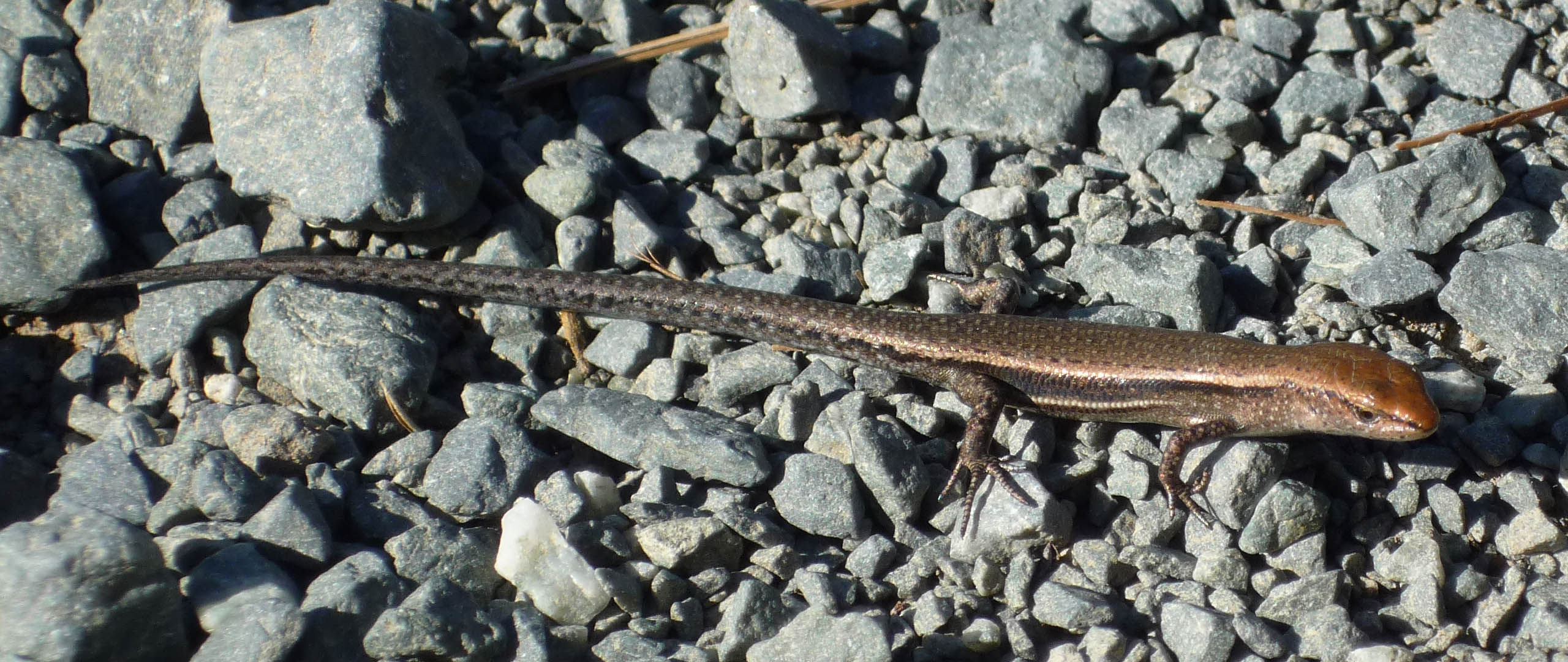
Note the yellowish stripe on the side.
