= Carinascincus orocryptus =

Conservation status
- Vulnerable (IUCN 3.1)

Scientific classification
- Kingdom: Animalia
- Phylum: Chordata
- Class: Reptilia
- Order: Squamata
- Family: Scincidae
- Genus: Carinascincus
- Species: C. orocryptus

Binomial name
- Carinascincus orocryptus (Hutchinson, Schwaner & Medlock, 1988)

Synonyms
- Leiolopisma orocryptum Hutchinson, Scwaner & Medlock, 1988; Niveoscincus orocryptus (Hutchinson, Schwaner & Medlock, 1988)

Species of lizard

Carinascincus orocryptus, commonly known as the heath cool-skink, the mountain skink, and the Tasmanian mountain skink, is a species of alpine skink, a lizard in the subfamily Eugongylinae of the family Scincidae. The species is endemic to South West Tasmania, Australia. Taxonomically, this species has also been previously known as Niveoscincus orocryptus, Leiolopisma orocryptum, and Pseudemoia orocrypta.

== Description ==
Carinascincus orocryptus is a small, long-limbed skink with a snout-to-vent length (SVL) of up to approximately 65 mm (2.6 in). It has a brown dorsal surface and a pale grey or occasionally bright red ventral surface or underbelly. Its body features pale brown dorsolateral stripes, a black vertebral stripe running from head to tail, a greyish white midlateral stripe extending from the lip to the hind limbs, and grey or black flecks on the lower flanks.

Due to similarities in colourations amongst all mountain skink species within alpine regions of Tasmania (such as Carinascincus microlepidotus and Carinascincus pretiosus), the Tasmanian mountain skink is distinguished through the presence of a black vertebral stripe and greyish white midlateral stripes. Due to interbreeding, particularly amongst Carinascincus orocryptus and Carinascincus microlepidotus, locality is also used to assist the identification between the species. The pressures of climate change also increase the likelihood of interbreeding amongst mountain (low elevation) and alpine species (high elevation).

== Habitat and distribution ==
As a mountain-dwelling lizard within the family Scincidae, Carinascincus orocryptus is found in alpine areas with elevations above 1,000 m (3,300 ft) within western and south-western Tasmania, where it inhabits dense alpine eucalyptus woodlands with heath understory. This includes areas such as Mt Eliza, Mt Field, Algonkian Mountain, Mt Hartz and Lake Seal. Primarily saxicolous and found in rocky areas, subpopulations of the Tasmanian mountain lizard in Mt Hartz have also been observed to be arboreal. Although this species is present within a range of 12,500 km^{2} (4,800 sq mi), its reliance on specific microhabitats and temperatures restricts it to a smaller, more confined area.

== Ecology ==
Carinascincus orocryptus is a diurnal insectivore that forages within shrub foliage and at the base of trees within alpine mountain regions. It frequently basks on rocks to thermoregulate and retain the mobility to transverse low shrubs and bushes. Interestingly, as a viviparous species it gives birth to live young instead of laying eggs like most reptiles. Females are perceived to give birth during late summer, usually of litters consisting of three to four offspring, with mating occurring shortly thereafter from late summer to early autumn. The mountain skink also has "reproductive adaptations" that "restrict it to cold sites" to be able to handle and thrive within cooler climate conditions.

== Cultural significance ==
The Tasmanian mountain skink is recognized to inhabit areas that are part of traditional lands, and skinks and other lizards are often tied to dreamtime stories that offer guidance and teaching relating to lore, morals, and kinship. Lizards hold a prominence within ceremony, art, totems, fire management stewardship, and provide a source of food and medicine.

== Threats and conservation ==
Climate change is the primary threat to the continuation of the species Carinascincus orocryptus due to habitat loss, and other assorted resources, due to interspecies competition. Although all reptiles rely on temperature to regulate physiological processes such as locomotion, metabolism, growth, and reproduction, alpine species are particularly vulnerable because they have a narrow thermal range and are highly sensitive to temperature changes. Climate change and altered climate regimes also affects the skinks behavior, subsequently impacting individual fitness and contributing to population declines. As a result, rising temperatures drive low-elevation species to migrate upslope, encroaching on the habitats of high-elevation alpine species and thereby increasing competition between the species.

Although current population statistics and allocated trends have been difficult to determine, the Australian government has now classified this species as endangered under the EPBC Act 1999. The IUCN status of this species, listed as vulnerable in 2017, should be updated to reflect its current conservation status issued by the Australian Commonwealth.
