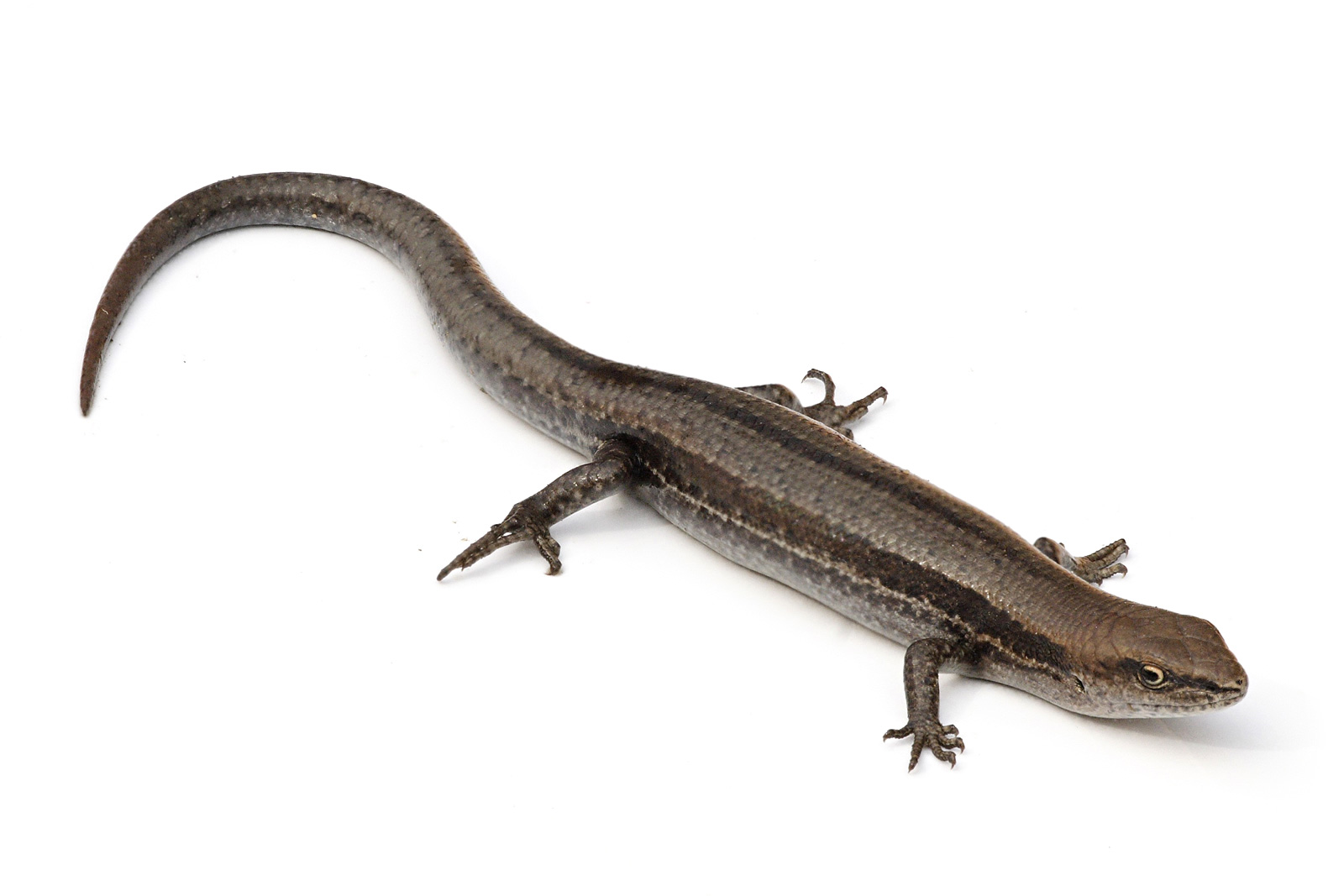

Conservation status
- Least Concern (IUCN 3.1)

Scientific classification
- Kingdom: Animalia
- Phylum: Chordata
- Class: Reptilia
- Order: Squamata
- Family: Scincidae
- Genus: Lampropholis
- Species: L. guichenoti

Binomial name
- Lampropholis guichenoti (A.M.C. Duméril & Bibron, 1839)

Synonyms
- Lygosoma guichenoti A.M.C. Duméril & Bibron, 1839; Lygosoma duperreyii A.M.C. Duméril & Bibron, 1839 (part); Lygosoma (Mocoa) guttulatum W. Peters, 1881; Lygosoma (Leiolopisma) guichenoti — M.A. Smith, 1937; Lampropholis guichenoti — Greer, 1974

= Common garden skink =

Species of lizard endemic to Australia

The common garden skink (Lampropholis guichenoti) is a small species of lizard in the family Scincidae. The species is endemic to Australia. Additional common names for L. guichenoti include grass skink, Guichenot's grass skink, pale-flecked garden sunskink, and penny lizard.

== Etymology ==
The specific name, guichenoti, is in honor of French zoologist Antoine Alphonse Guichenot.

== Geographic range ==
In Australia, L. guichenoti is often seen in suburban gardens in Adelaide, Melbourne, Perth, Sydney, Canberra and Brisbane, but also is common across most of Southern Australia, Tasmania, and some of New South Wales.

== Description ==
L. guichenoti can grow to a maximum length, including its tail, of 14 cm (5.5 in), but the average total length is 8–10 cm (3.1–3.9 in). The average common garden skink lives for 2–3 years. It usually has a browny black colour and may appear a dark shade of red when bathing in the sun. The lighter its colour, the more energetic it is. It has small sharp teeth which easily slice through smaller prey. Even wild individuals are very docile, and rarely bite humans when touched or picked up.

The female pale-flecked garden sunskink has a yellowish, almost orange tinge to her underside, however the males have a light grey tinge to their underside. Females are often bigger than the males in size.

Capable swimmers, skinks have been known to dive under water to evade predators and remain submerged for several minutes until a threat has passed.

== Diet ==
The common garden skink feeds on invertebrates, including crickets, moths, slaters, earthworms, flies, grubs and caterpillars, grasshoppers, cockroaches, earwigs, slugs, small spiders, ladybeetles and many other small insects. Its diet also consists of dandelions. In captivity, it can also fed fruit and vegetables, but the latter must be cooked in order for skinks to consume them. Their diet also consists of bananas, strawberries and blueberries etc. (no citrus fruit). The common garden skink relies purely on the movement of its prey when hunting. When hunting, the skink will either hide and wait for prey to come by or actively pursue it, depending on its hunger levels. Once it has caught its prey, it shakes it around vigorously to kill it before swallowing it whole. Once it has had one meal, it begins to actively pursue prey for a short while with its newfound energy. The common garden skink only needs one prey item per four or five days, which has led to it being kept as a pet for small children.. It can also be fed earthworms if the soil is drained out of them with salt water.</ref>

== Habitat ==
Although L. guichenoti is often seen under leaves, in long grass and under rocks so that it can watch its prey, it also prefers hiding in logs where it is out of reach of larger predators. It prefers being around rock tumbles, due to the crevices serving as hiding spots. As with most reptiles, the common garden skink is cold-blooded and may be seen on top of rocks or paths in the morning trying to warm its blood. It prefers large areas with a lot of leaves and soft soil. It is normally found around dry areas that have spots to hide in.

== Predators ==
The common garden skink's predators are mainly birds and cats. It is also preyed upon by small birds, such as robins. Larger lizards and snakes are also predators. Like many other skinks, its tail will drop if grasped roughly. The disconnected tail will twitch vigorously for a while, capturing the attention of the predator while the lizard makes its escape. This survival tactic may seem hard for the skink to tolerate, but it is quite the opposite. Although it may cost the skink some energy, the skink's tail will eventually grow back to normal.

== Eggs ==
The common garden skink is oviparous and lays small white eggs between summer and mid autumn. The female usually lays about six eggs, often in communal clutches that may contain as many as 250 eggs altogether, usually under a cluster of rocks to keep them safe from predators. The eggs hatch in a matter of weeks after they are laid. Most eggs are around 10 mm (0.39 in).
