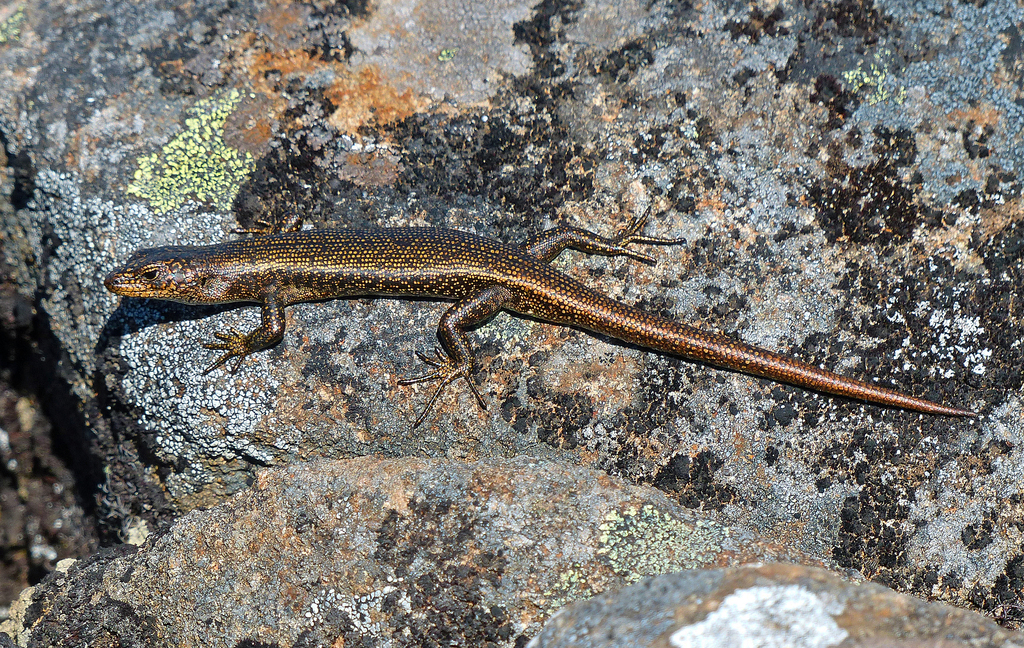

Conservation status
- Vulnerable (IUCN 3.1)

Scientific classification
- Kingdom: Animalia
- Phylum: Chordata
- Class: Reptilia
- Order: Squamata
- Family: Scincidae
- Genus: Carinascincus
- Species: C. greeni

Binomial name
- Carinascincus greeni (Rawlinson, 1975)

Synonyms
- Leiolopisma greeni Rawlinson, 1975; Carinascincus greeni — Wells & Wellington, 1985; Niveoscincus greeni — Hutchinson et al., 1990; Pseudemoia greeni — Frank & Ramus, 1995; Niveoscincus greeni — Melville & Swain, 2000; Carinascincus greeni — Greer, 2005; Niveoscincus greeni — Wilson & Swan, 2013; Carinascincus greeni — Cogger, 2014

= Alpine cool-skink =

Species of lizard

The alpine cool-skink (Carinascincus greeni), also known commonly as the northern snow skink, is a species of lizard in the subfamily Eugongylinae of the family Scincidae. It is endemic to Tasmania, Australia where it mainly occurs within the north of the state.

== Etymology ==
The specific name, greeni, is in honor of Tasmanian ornithologist Robert "Bob" Green.

== Classification ==
This species was previously known as Niveoscincus greeni, however it has been reclassified as Carinascincus, along with several other species from the genus Niveoscincus.

== Description ==
Carinascincus greeni is an alpine skink which has small dark scales with pale green to bronze spots. The head is sometimes paler than the body, with larger spots. C. greeni has been found to grow to a snout-to-vent length (SVL) of up to 7.5 cm (3.0 in), with midbody scales in 40–44 rows around the body.

== Habitat and geographic distribution ==
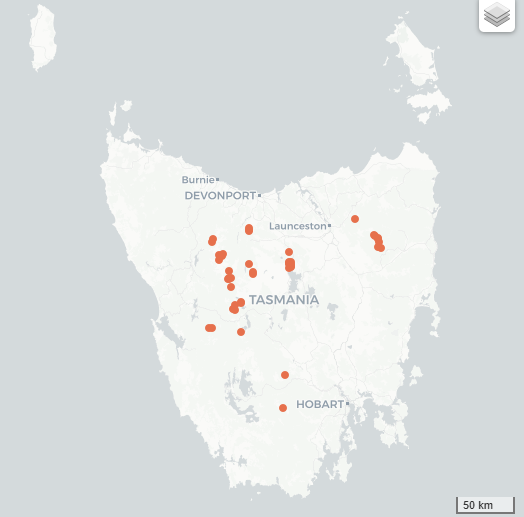
Distribution of Carinascincus greeni from Atlas of Living Australia)

Carinascincus greeni is skink species endemic to alpine areas of Tasmania above 1,000 m (3,300 ft) of elevation. The species is mostly observed around Cradle Mountain and the central plateau, however it is found as far east as Ben Lomond National Park and as far south as Mt Field.

It is restricted to rocky banks of streams and swamps, as well as boulder fields where it can often be found basking. Where it co-occurs with other species within the same genus such as Carinascincus microlepidotus, C. greeni has been found to competitively exclude the other species from the optimal basking spots of exposed rocks and boulders.

== Reproduction ==
Carinascincus greeni has adapted to the cooler climate of high altitudes by evolving viviparity, retaining its eggs during the gestation process and giving birth to live young. Retaining its eggs during gestation is what has allowed C. greeni to protect its eggs from the rapid changes in temperature the eggs would otherwise be exposed to in the alpine environments it inhabits. This skink species gives birth to a litter of 2–4 young around March, and only reproduces biannually; females can store sperm over the winter and fertilize their eggs during spring.

== Threats ==
Carinascincus greeni is listed as "Vulnerable" under the IUCN Red List, with the main threat being climate change, which is likely to reduce the extent of cool habitats the species relies on. In addition, climate change may cause lowland skink species such as Carinascincus metallicus and Carinascincus ocellatus to encroach on the limited habitat that C. greeni occupies. This threat is compounded by the fact that these lowland species reproduce annually instead of biannually like C. greeni.
