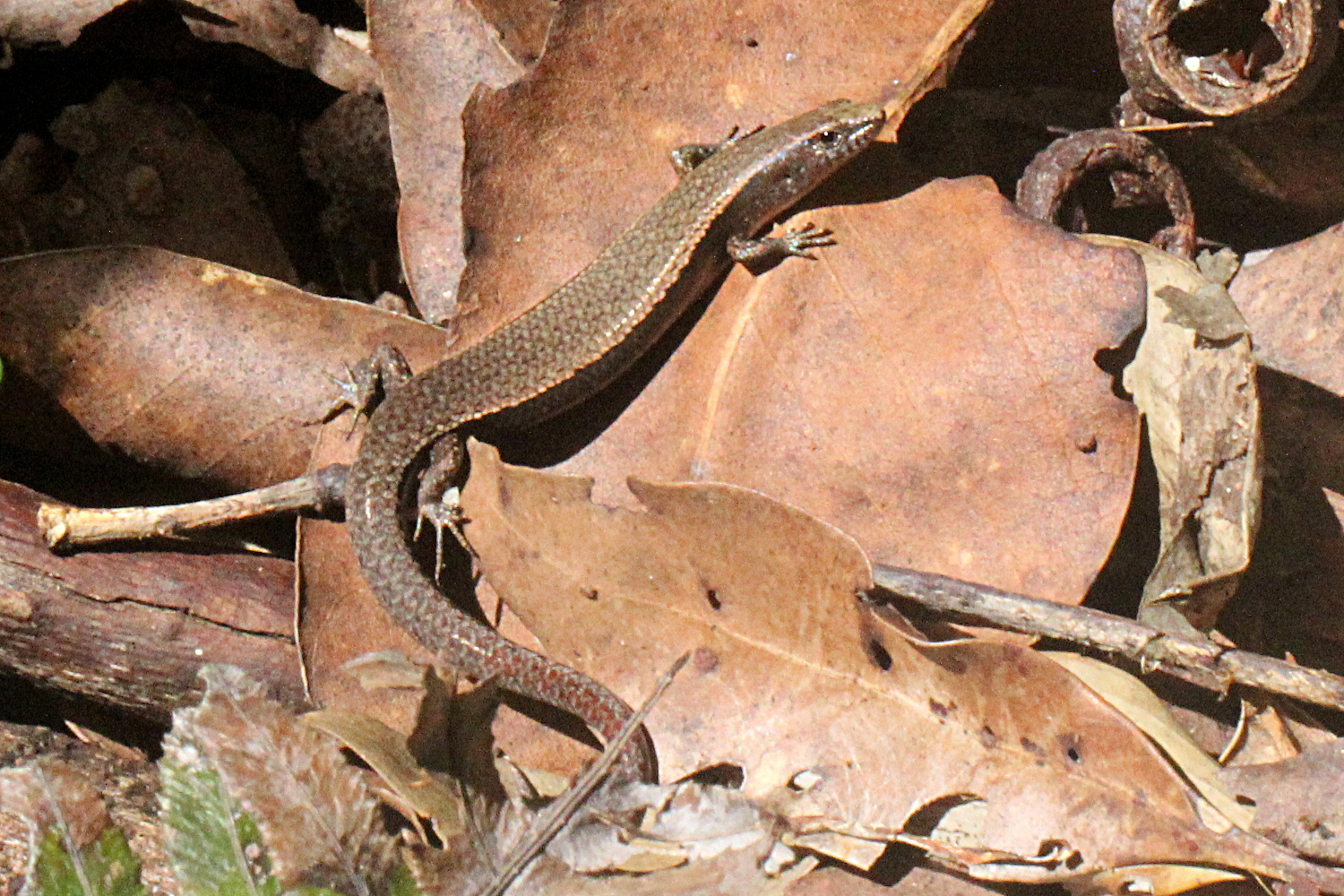

Conservation status
- Least Concern (IUCN 3.1)

Scientific classification
- Kingdom: Animalia
- Phylum: Chordata
- Class: Reptilia
- Order: Squamata
- Family: Scincidae
- Genus: Lampropholis
- Species: L. couperi

Binomial name
- Lampropholis couperi Ingram, 1991

= Lampropholis couperi =

Species of lizard

Lampropholis couperi, commonly known as the plain-backed sunskink, is a species of skink, a lizard in the family Scincidae. The species is endemic to Queensland, Australia.

== Etymology ==
The specific name, couperi, is in honour of Australian herpetologist Patrick J. Couper.

== Habitat ==
The preferred natural habitat of L. couperi is forest.

== Reproduction ==
L. couperi, is oviparous.
