= Pedra Branca skink =

Conservation status
- Vulnerable (IUCN 3.1)

Scientific classification
- Kingdom: Animalia
- Phylum: Chordata
- Class: Reptilia
- Order: Squamata
- Family: Scincidae
- Genus: Carinascincus
- Species: C. palfreymani

Binomial name
- Carinascincus palfreymani (Rawlinson, 1974)

Synonyms
- Pseudemoia palfreymani Rawlinson, 1974; Leiolopisma palfreymani — Greer, 1974; Niveoscincus palfreymani — Hutchinson et al., 1990; Carinascincus palfreymani — Cogger, 2014

Species of lizard

The Pedra Branca skink (Carinascincus palfreymani) also known commonly as Palfreyman's window-eyed skink, the Pedra Branca cool-skink, and the red-throated skink, is a species of lizard in the subfamily Eugongylinae of the family Scincidae. The species is endemic to Australia, and is restricted to the windswept Pedra Branca, an island off southern Tasmania of only 2.5 ha (6.2 acres), where it is dependent on the seabird colonies. It is the only lizard species found on the island.

== Etymology ==
The specific name, palfreymani, is in honor of Mr. A.E. Palfreyman who collected the first specimens of this species.

== Description ==
Adults of Carinascincus palfreymani have a head and body length of 6–10 cm (2.4–3.9 in). Adults weigh about 14 grams (0.49 oz), while pregnant females can weigh up to 22 grams (0.78 oz). Adults are a glossy charcoal colour, while juveniles are more lightly coloured.

== Biology ==
The Pedra Branca skink feeds on small invertebrates such as insects, spiders and isopods. It has also been observed to feed on fish scraps dropped or regurgitated by seabirds on the island, and to feed as well on seabird eggs. However, these foods are only available to the skink on a seasonal basis.

There are six separate colonies of the Pedra Branca skink on the island with a total population that fluctuates between 250 and 600 lizards, depending on food availability. The skink is preyed upon by silver gulls. The movement of silver gull colonies into areas where the skinks are living has recently led to the decline of some skink colonies.

The Pedra Branca skink lives in crevices in the rocks, which provide protection from wind, salt spray and waves. Adult skinks defend their burrows against intrusion by other skinks. However, they are only active when air temperatures are above 15 °C (59 °F).

The Pedra Branca skink is a long-lived species. It does not mature until about 6 to 8 years of age. It can live at least 10 years, possibly up to 15 years.

Like most endemic Tasmanian skinks, the Pedra Branca skink bears live young.

== Status ==
Carinascincus palfreymani is considered to be vulnerable due to the restricted range and multiple threats including seabird predation, fluctuations in the food supply, climate change and the threat of invasion by introduced predators such as rats.
