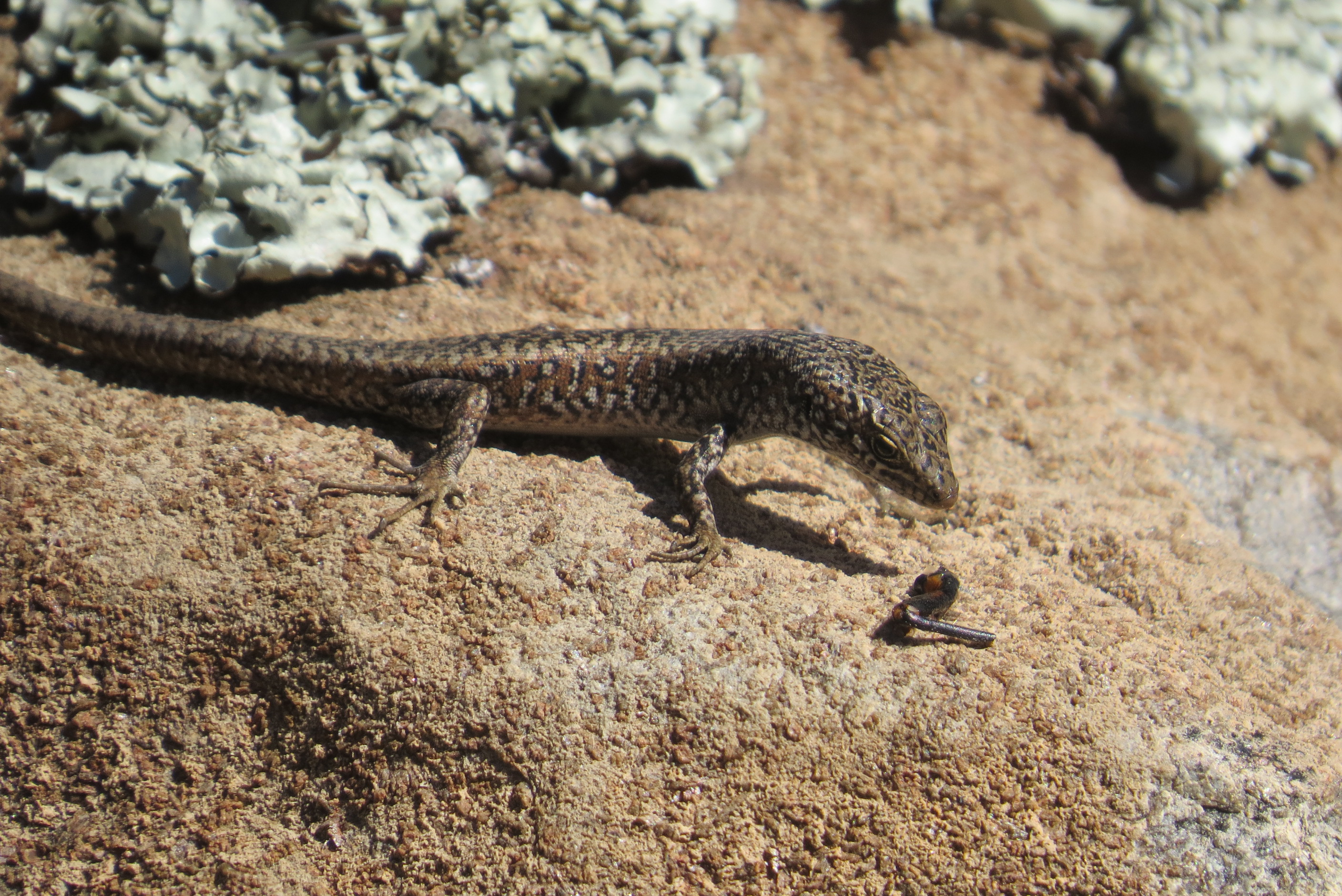
- Spotted Skink at Cataract Gorge in Tasmania, Australia

Conservation status
- Least Concern (IUCN 3.1)

Scientific classification
- Kingdom: Animalia
- Phylum: Chordata
- Class: Reptilia
- Order: Squamata
- Suborder: Scinciformata
- Infraorder: Scincomorpha
- Family: Scincidae
- Genus: Carinascincus
- Species: C. ocellatus

Binomial name
- Carinascincus ocellatus (Gray, 1845)

Synonyms
- Leiolopisma ocellata; Niveoscincus ocellatus

= Carinascincus ocellatus =

Spotted skink

Species of lizard

The spotted skink (Carinascincus ocellatus), sometimes called the ocellated cool-skink or ocellated skink, is a skink endemic to Tasmania, Australia. It is a ground-dwelling, viviparous species, usually found in rocky habitats, and widespread in the northern and eastern parts of the state, as well as in the eastern Bass Strait islands. It is often found at Arthurs Lake in the Central Highlands of Tasmania.

Spotted skink populations are distributed along an altitudinal gradient, with variations in thermal conditions along the gradient affecting body temperature regulation and reproductive activity. Skinks in low to mid altitudes achieve their optimal body temperature year-round and predominantly undergo vitellogenesis and ovulation in spring and gestation in summer, while skinks occupying higher, subalpine altitudes struggle to maintain their preferred temperature in the autumn months, and typically undergo ovulation and parturition one month later than other members of the species.
