= Harold Cogger =

Australian herpetologist (born 1935)

Harold George "Hal" Cogger (born 4 May 1935) is an Australian herpetologist. He was curator of reptiles and amphibians at the Australian Museum from 1960 to 1975, and Deputy Director of the museum from 1976 to 1995. He has written extensively on Australian herpetology, and was the first author to create a field guide for all Australian frogs and reptiles.

Cogger was made an honorary Doctor of Science in 1997. At least eight reptile taxa have been named after Cogger, including one genus, six species, and one subspecies: Coggeria, Ctenotus coggeri, Emoia coggeri, Geomyersia coggeri, Hydrophis coggeri, Lampropholis coggeri, Oedura coggeri, and Diporiphora nobbi coggeri.
