= Patrick J. Couper =

New Zealand-born Australian herpetologist

Patrick J. Couper (born 1958) is a herpetologist in Queensland, Australia. Born in New Zealand, he migrated to Australia in 1981. Couper began his career at the Queensland Museum in 1984. He was initially employed in display construction, and became a research assistant in herpetology in 1986 under the direction and mentorship of the admired senior curator and head of Vertebrate Zoology, Jeanette Covacevich. Since 1993 he has been Curator of Reptiles and Amphibians at the Queensland Museum. A major research focus has been leaf-tailed geckos that inhabit rainforest and rock habitats in eastern Queensland and New South Wales.

A species of lizard, Lampropholis couperi, is named in honour of Patrick J. Couper.
