= Pullar =

Pullar may refer to:

- Bill Pullar (1926–1981), Canadian football player
- Bill Pullar (athlete) (1913–1990), New Zealand track-and-field athlete
- David Pullar (born 1959), English footballer
- Dean Pullar (born 1973), Australian diver
- Edmund Pullar (1848–1926), Scottish businessman
- Frederick Pullar (1875–1901), Scottish meteorologist
- Geoff Pullar (1935–2014), England and Lancashire cricketer
- George Pullar (born c.1995), Australian actor
- Jack Pullar (born 1989), British cyclist
- James Pullar (1835–1912), Scottish businessman
- Laurence Pullar (1838–1926), Scottish businessman and geographer
- Lulu Pullar (born 1998), Australian rules footballer and former soccer player
- Philippa Pullar (1935–1997), British author
- Rachel Pullar (born 1977), New Zealand cricketer
- Robert Pullar (1828–1912), Scottish politician
- Willie Pullar (1900–1954), Scottish footballer
