= Robert Burns Young =

Prof Robert Burns Young FRSE FRSSA FGS (1874–1949) was a 20th-century Scottish geologist. He was Chairman of the Diamond Control Board in South Africa. He was President of the Geological Society of South Africa in 1910 and 1926.

== Life ==
He was born in Perth in 1874, the son of Andrew Young and his wife, Llllas Burns. His older brother was Andrew Young. He graduated with an MA from the University of Glasgow in 1897. He then undertook a second science degree at the University of Edinburgh specialising in geology and graduating with BSc in 1903. Prior to graduation (1899–1901) he joined Sir John Murray and Frederick Pullar in their Bathymetric Survey of all Scottish lochs.

In 1903 he succeeded his brother Andrew as lecturer in Geology at the South African College in Cape Town. He was created Professor in 1904 at Witwatersrand University.

In 1904 he was elected a Fellow of the Royal Society of Edinburgh. His proposers were Sir John Murray, Thomas Nicol Johnston, John Horne and James Geikie.

He joined the South African Philosophical Society in 1905 and was a member at the point of its transformation into the Royal Society of South Africa in 1908. He was made a Fellow in 1914.

He retired in 1934.

He died in Johannesburg on 21 April 1949.

== Family ==
He was married to the violinist Janet F. Algie. They had no children.

== Publications ==
- The Life and Times of George William Stow, South African Geologist
