= Eliza H. Hamilton =

- advertisement from the Edinburgh Daily Review, 10 February 1869.
- Born: October 3, 1807; Glasgow
- Died: April 14, 1868; Bridge of Allan
- Occupation: Writer
- Relatives: C. G. Hamilton, Alexander Hamilton

Eliza Helen Hamilton (October 3, 1807 – April 14, 1868) was a Scottish author of religious hymns and tracts. She is best known for the hymn "Jesus, my Lord, to Thee I cry ('O take me as I am')."

Eliza Helen Hamilton was born on October 3, 1807 in Glasgow, one of eight children of Charles Hamilton, a merchant, and Isabella Hamilton (née Campbell). Her siblings included the novelists Alexander Hamilton and Catherine Georgina Hamilton.

According to Ira D. Sankey, who set Hamilton's hymn to music, "Jesus, my Lord, to Thee I cry" was inspired by a young Scottish woman converted at a revival meeting. When the minister told her to read her Bible, she replied "O Minister, I canna read, I canna pray! Lord Jesus, take me as I am !" It was included in her Hymns for the Weary, a short collection of 16 hymns that runs only 31 pages. Other hymns included are ‘My Saviour, Thou hast offered rest,' ‘Come, thou weary worn one’, ‘My weary spirit is oppress’d’, ‘How weary is this mortal coil’, and ‘Nothing between, Lord, nothing between’. The only known extant copy of Hymns for the Weary is of the sixth edition, owned by the British Library.

Hamilton also authored a number of religious tracts. The Destroyer: A Temperance Tale is a sixteen page tract about "the evils of the rum traffic." The titles of others appear in advertisements but copies may no longer exist.

Eliza Helen Hamilton died on 14 April 1868 in Bridge of Allan.

== Bibliography ==
- Hymns for the Weary (6th edition). Edinburgh : J. Taylor, 1868.
- The Destroyer: A Temperance Tale. 1 vol. Edinburgh: James Taylor, 1869.
- The Convent: or, Paths of Danger. Edinburgh: James Taylor.
- The Hurricane: a Touching Story. Edinburgh: James Taylor.
- Charlie Grant, the Young Pedlar, Edinburgh: James Taylor.
