= Pullard =

Pullard is a surname. Notable people with the surname include:

- Anthony Pullard (born 1966), American basketball player who also played in Mexico
- Hayes Pullard (born 1992), American football player and coach

== See also ==
- Bullard
- Pullar
