= Thomas Nicol Johnston =

Scottish physician and noted amateur zoologist

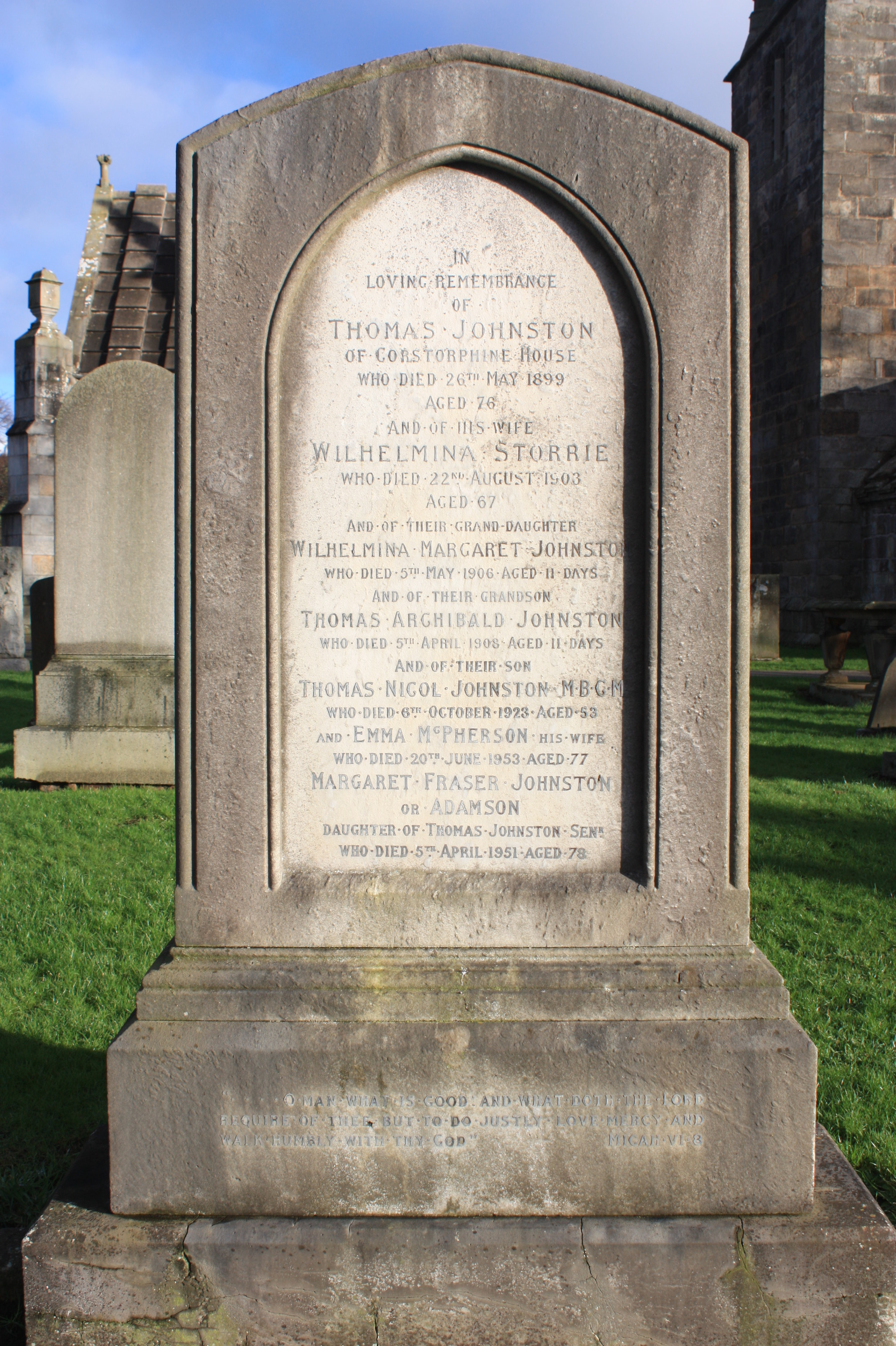
The grave of Thomas Nicol Johnston, Corstorphine churchyard, Edinburgh

Thomas Nicol Johnston FRSE (1870–1923) was a Scottish physician and noted amateur zoologist.

== Life ==
He was the son of Wilhelmina Storrie (1836–1903) and Thomas Johnston (1822–1899) of Corstorphine House in western Edinburgh.

He studied medicine as a mature student at the University of Edinburgh beginning in 1897. He graduated with an MB ChB. From 1902 to 1907 he acted as the zoologist on John Murray and Laurence Pullar's Bathymetrical Survey of the Scottish Fresh-Water Lochs. In 1903 he was elected a Fellow of the Royal Society of Edinburgh. His proposers were Sir John Murray, Laurence Pullar, Alexander Buchan and John Horne.

He died at Humbie in East Lothian on 6 October 1923 but is buried with his parents in Corstorphine Parish Churchyard in western Edinburgh.

== Family ==
He was married to Emma McPherson (1876-1953).

In 1917 he appears to have been involved in an antenuptial contract relating to the mental health of his daughter, Margaret Fraser Johnston to Charles Henry Adamson.
