= 1907 Perth by-election =

UK parliamentary by-election

The 1907 Perth by-election was held on 12 February 1907. The by-election was held due to the resignation of the incumbent Liberal MP, Robert Wallace, in order to become Chairman of the County of London sessions. It was won by the Liberal candidate Sir Robert Pullar, who was unopposed. Pullar was then aged 79 years (less six days), making his possibly the oldest debut of a British MP in the 20th century.
