= Edmund Pullar =

Scottish businessman and philanthropist

Edmund Pullar DL JP (26 October 1848 – 8 May 1926) was a 19th-century Scottish businessman and philanthropist. He ran the Bridge of Allan branch of the family firm of J & J Pullar Ltd later known as Pullars of Perth.

== Life ==
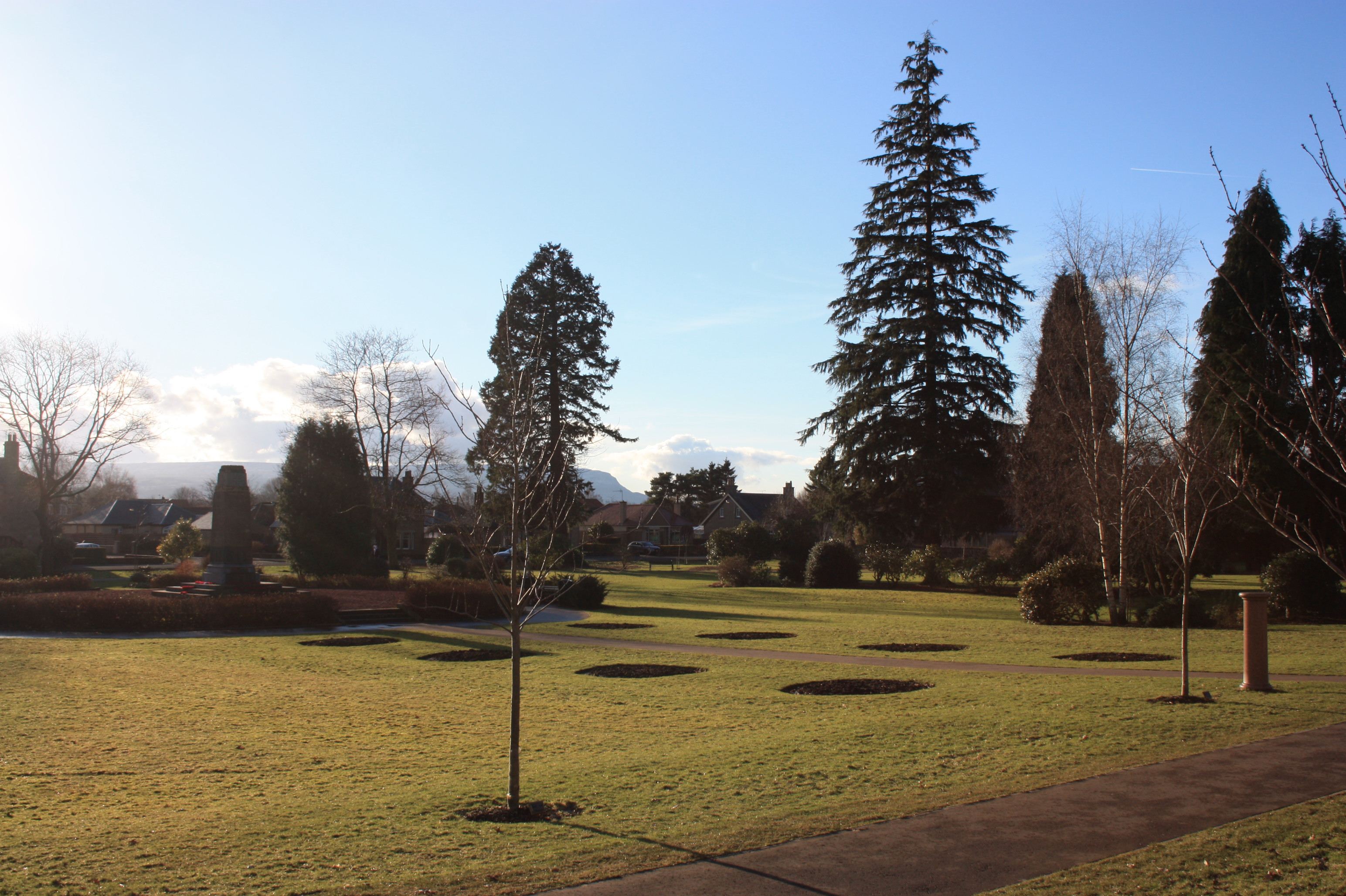
Pullar Memorial Park and War Memorial, Bridge of Allan

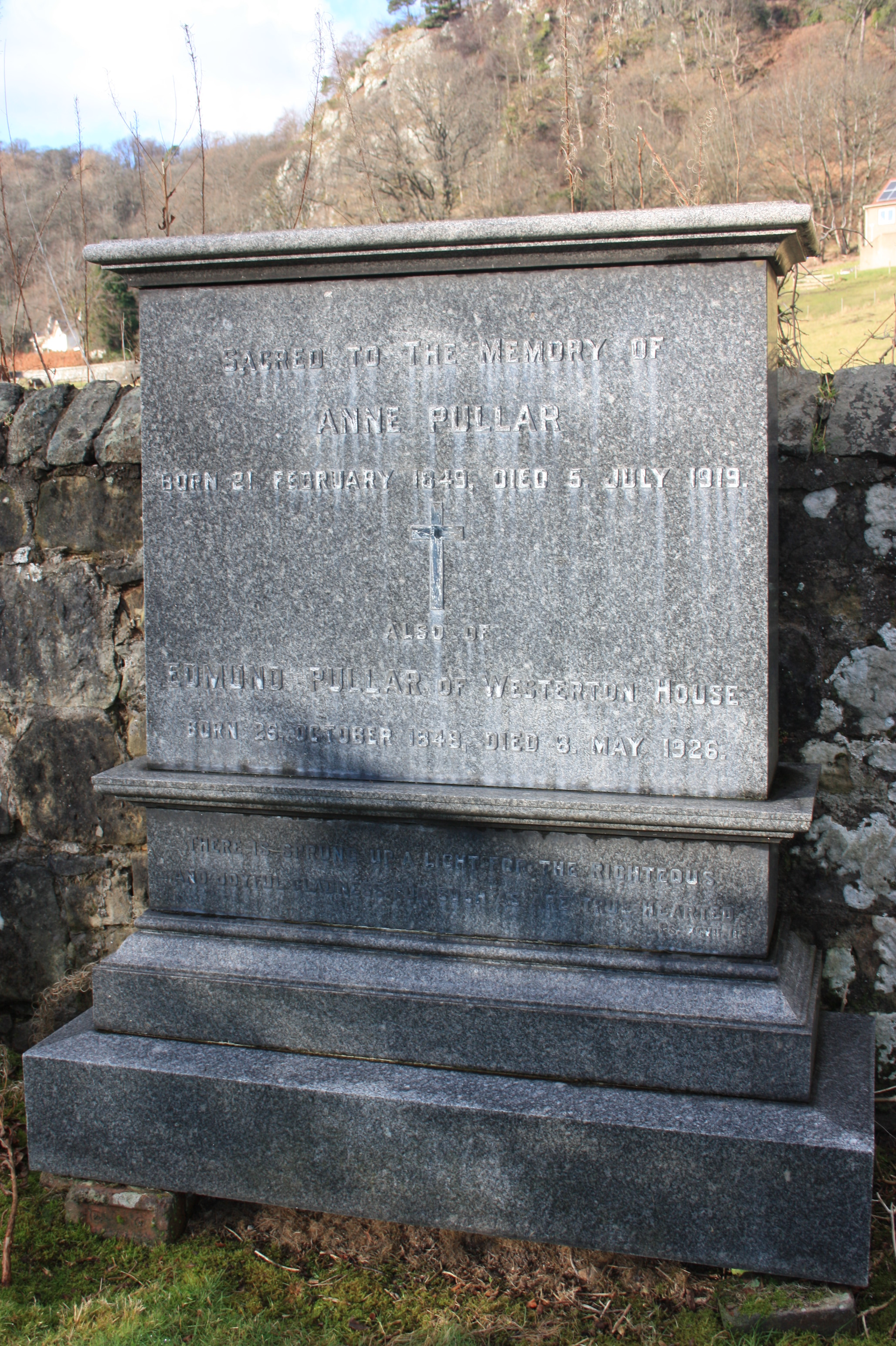
The grave of Edmund Pullar, Logie Kirkyard

He was born at 36 Mill Street in Perth on 26 October 1848, the youngest son of cloth manufacturer John Pullar (1803–1878) and his wife, Mary Walker.

Around 1870 he moved to Bridge of Allan with his brother Laurence Pullar to run the huge Keirfield Manufacturing Works on the south side of the town.

Some time after 1885 he purchased the house of Westerton in Bridge of Allan. It had been built in 1803 by Dr John Henderson of the East India Company and in 1853 passed to General Sir James Edward Alexander.

In the First World War he served as a Major (probably of the local Territorial Force). Aged 65 at the war's outbreak, he did not see active service but probably knew many of the men sent to fight.

In 1919 he donated a memorial plaque to Bridge of Allan to mark the arrival of a water supply in the town from Cocksburn Reservoir. The plaque stood on the edge of the reservoir but is now stored by the Dr Welsh Trust.

In 1923 he paid for and organised the creation of Pullar Memorial Park in Bridge of Allan, to house a war memorial to the 81 men from the town killed in the First World War.

He died at Westerton House in Bridge of Allan on 8 May 1926 aged 77 and was buried in Logie Kirkyard, east of Stirling, where his brother Laurence also lies. The grave lies against the north wall.

The Keirfield site still exists but is now occupied by United Plastics and Closures.

== Family ==
His illustrious older brothers were Sir Robert Pullar, James Pullar and Laurence Pullar; he was uncle to Frederick Pullar.

His wife Anne Pullar (1849–1919) was President of the Stirling Branch of the Women's Suffrage Movement. At this time Mrs. Lambert Brown of Stirling served as Vice President. She had a close relationship in this role with Chrystal Macmillan.
