= Robert Wallace (Perth MP) =

British politician and judge

Wallace c1906

Sir Robert Wallace KC (1850 – 19 March 1939) was an Irish-born barrister and Liberal Party politician.

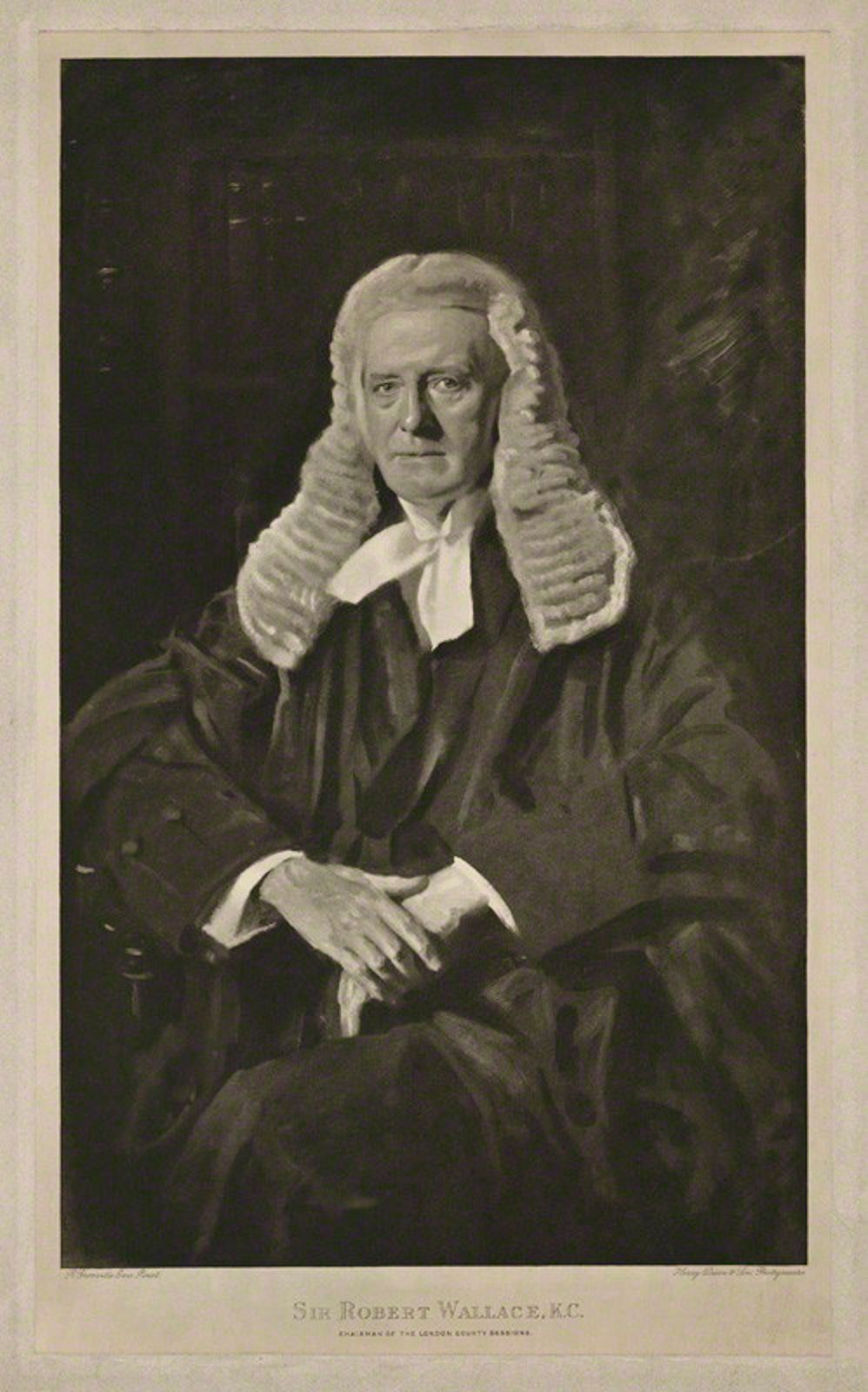
A 1907 photogravure of Wallace based on work by Reginald Grenville Eves.

He was born in County Antrim, the 3rd son of Rev. Robert Wallace of Dublin, and was educated at Queen's University, Belfast.

He was admitted to the Middle Temple on 8 November 1871 and was Called to the Bar on 6 June 1874. He contested Wandsworth in 1885, Edinburgh West in 1886, and Renfrewshire West in 1892 before being elected as the Member of Parliament (MP) for Perth at the 1895 general election. He held the seat until 1907, when he resigned his seat to become Chairman of the County of London sessions, a post which he held until 1931.

He was knighted in 1916.

== Sources ==
- Who Was Who

Parliament of the United Kingdom
| Preceded by William Whitelaw | Member of Parliament for Perth; 1895–1907 | Succeeded by Sir Robert Pullar |
