= Silvascincus tryoni =

Conservation status
- Least Concern (IUCN 3.1)

Scientific classification
- Kingdom: Animalia
- Phylum: Chordata
- Class: Reptilia
- Order: Squamata
- Family: Scincidae
- Genus: Silvascincus
- Species: S. tryoni

Binomial name
- Silvascincus tryoni (Longman, 1918)
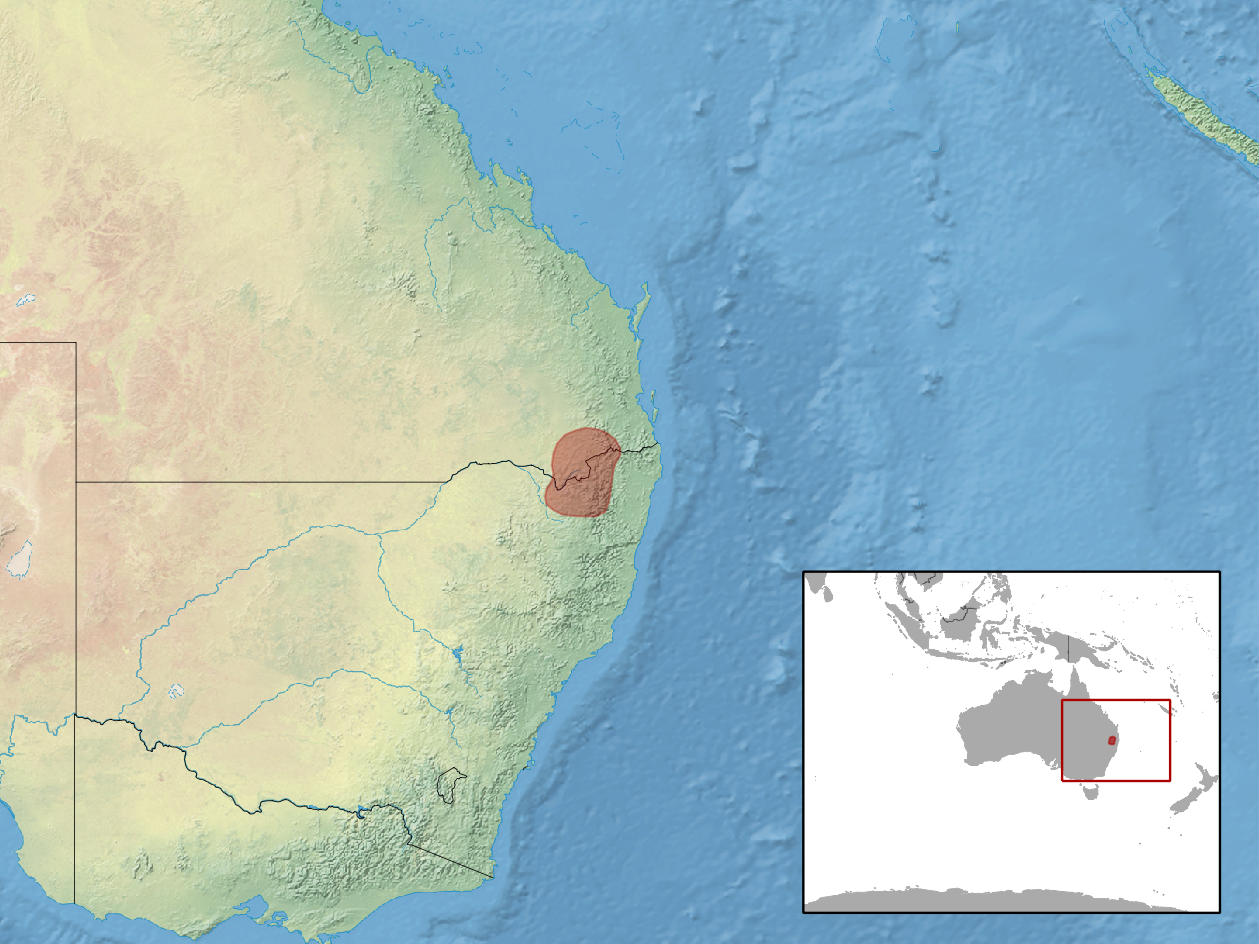

Synonyms
- Lygosoma (Hinulia) tryoni Longman, 1918; Sphenomorphus tryoni — Bustard, 1964; Eulamprus tryoni — Sadlier, 1998; Cogger, 2000; Wilson & Swan, 2010; Silvascincus tryoni — SKINNER et al. 2013

Species of lizard

Silvascincus tryoni, also known commonly as the Border Ranges blue-spectacled skink and the forest skink, is a species of lizard in the subfamily Sphenomorphinae of the family Scincidae. The species is endemic to the McPherson Range bordering New South Wales and Queensland, Australia.

== Etymology ==
The specific name, tryoni, is in honor of English scientist Henry Tryon (1856–1943).

== Description ==
Silvascincus tryoni can grow to 104 mm (4.1 in) in snout-to-vent length (SVL). It has well-defined, dark transverse dorsal markings on a light to mid-brown background.

== Reproduction ==
Silvascincus tryoni is viviparous. A female measuring 100 mm (3.9 in) SVL and 189 mm (7.4 in) total length (tail included) gave birth to five young measuring 33–35 mm (1.3–1.4 in) SVL.

== Habitat and behavior ==
Silvascincus tryoni occurs in highland closed subtropical rainforest at elevations of 760–1,100 m (2,490–3,610 ft) above sea level. Specimens have been found on logs and rocks, under decayed logs, and sunning at the base of a hollow giant stinging tree Dendrocnide excelsa. When disturbed, they seek refuge under rocks and logs.

== Conservation ==
Silvascincus tryoni might be at least locally common. Its range is small but coincides, perhaps entirely, with protected areas, including Lamington and Border Ranges National Parks. It is unlikely to be facing any major threats.
