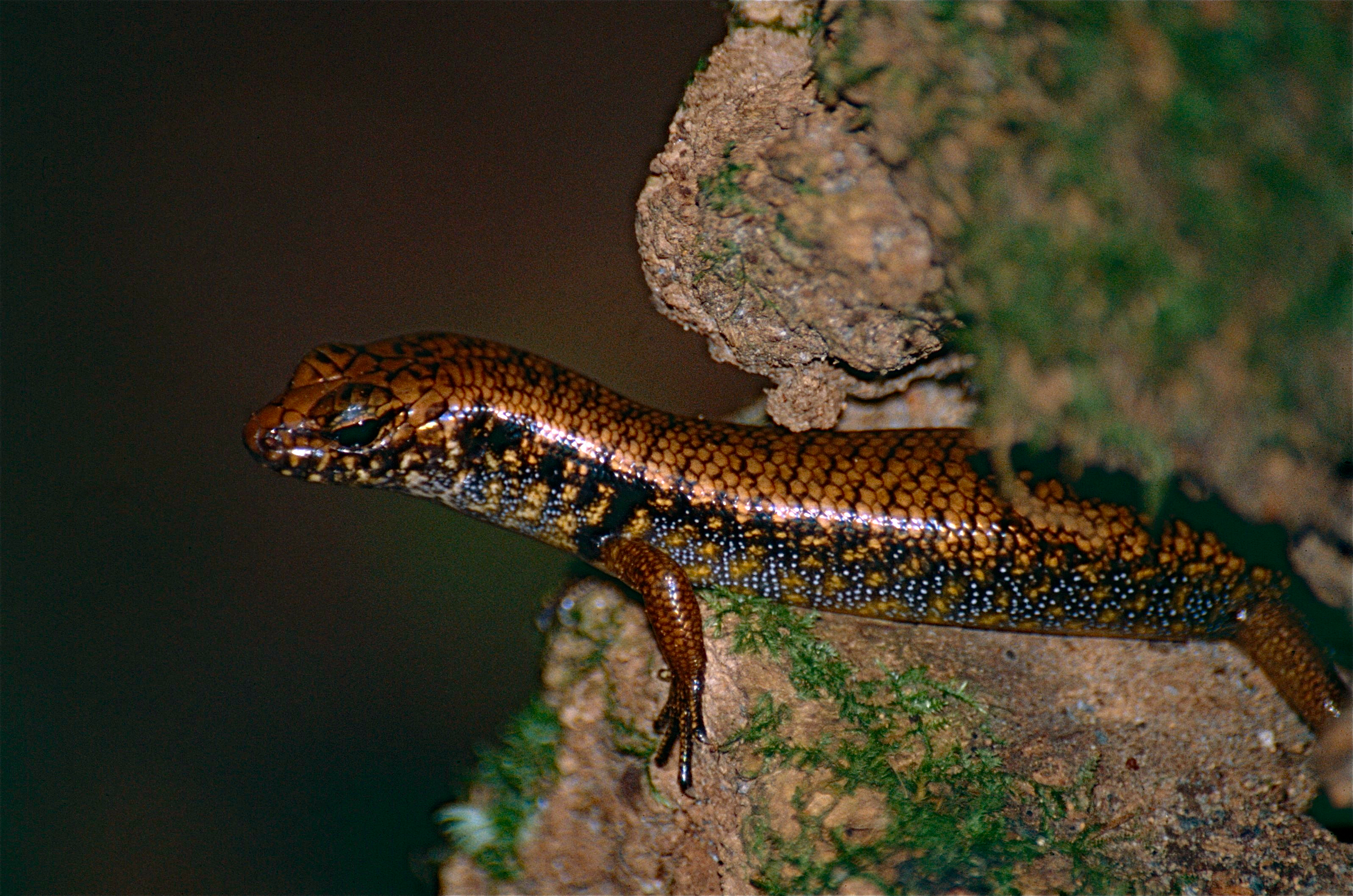
- Silvascincus murrayi

Scientific classification
- Kingdom: Animalia
- Phylum: Chordata
- Class: Reptilia
- Order: Squamata
- Family: Scincidae
- Subfamily: Sphenomorphinae
- Genus: Silvascincus; Skinner, Hutchinson & Lee, 2013

Species
- Two, see text.

= Silvascincus =

Genus of lizards

Silvascincus is a genus of skinks, lizards in the subfamily Sphenomorphinae of the family Scincidae. Both species in the genus are endemic to Australia. They were previously placed in the genus Eulamprus.

== Species ==
The following two species, listed alphabetically by specific name, are recognized as being valid:

- Silvascincus murrayi (Boulenger, 1887) – blue-speckled forest-skink, Murray's skink
- Silvascincus tryoni (Longman, 1918) – Border Ranges blue-spectacled skink, forest skink

Nota bene: A binomial authority in parentheses indicates that the species was originally described in a genus other than Silvascincus.
