= Andy Taylor (cricketer) =

Scottish cricketer

Personal information
- Full name: Andrew Rankine Taylor
- Born: 8 February 1955 (age 71); Bridge of Allan, Stirlingshire, Scotland
- Batting: Right-handed
- Bowling: Right-arm medium-fast

Domestic team information
- Years: Team
- 1982: Scotland

Career statistics
Competition	List A
Matches	1
Runs scored	0
Batting average	0.00
100s/50s	–/–
Top score	0
Balls bowled	12
Wickets	0
Bowling average	–
5 wickets in innings	–
10 wickets in match	–
Best bowling	–
Catches/stumpings	–/–
- Source: Cricinfo, 29 October 2022

Andrew 'Andy' Rankine Taylor (born 8 February 1955) is a Scottish former cricketer.

Taylor was born at Bridge of Allan in February 1955. A club cricketer for Carlton, he made a single appearance for Scotland in a List A one-day match against Warwickshire at Edgbaston in the 1982 Benson & Hedges Cup. He was dismissed without scoring by Gladstone Small, while with the ball he bowled two wicketless overs with his right-arm medium-fast bowling.
