= Bridge of Allan =

Coordinates: 56.155°N 3.942°W

Bridge of Allan: Scottish Gaelic: Drochaid Ailein; Scots: Brig Allan
- Town
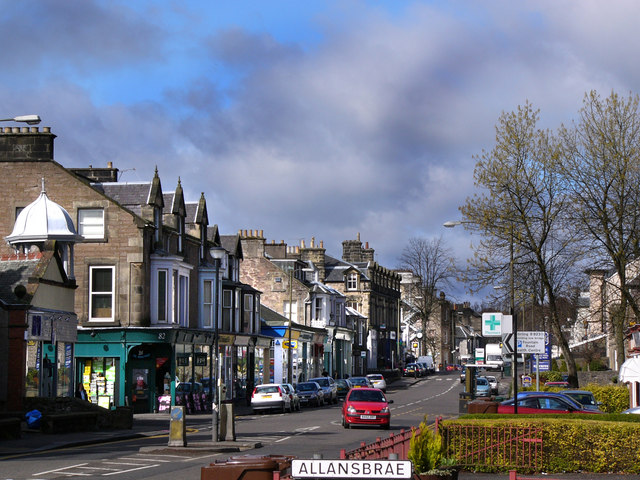
- Henderson Street, Bridge of Allan in 2004

- Location within the Stirling council area
- Population: 5,320 (2020)
- OS grid reference: NS794974
- Civil parish: Logie
- Council area: Stirling
- Lieutenancy area: Stirling and Falkirk
- Country: Scotland
- Sovereign state: United Kingdom
- Post town: STIRLING
- Postcode district: FK9
- Dialling code: 01786
- Police: Scotland
- Fire: Scottish
- Ambulance: Scottish
- UK Parliament: Stirling and Strathallan
- Scottish Parliament: Clackmannanshire and Dunblane

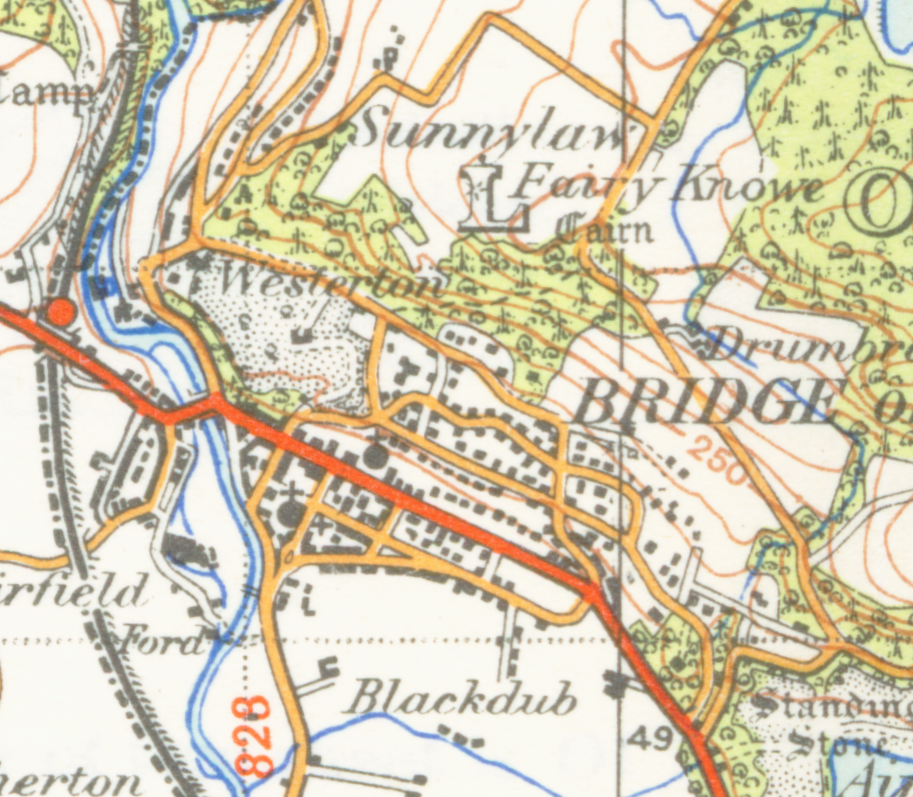
A map of Bridge of Allan from 1945

Bridge of Allan (Scots: Brig Allan, Scottish Gaelic: Drochaid Ailein), also known colloquially as Bofa, is a former spa town in the Stirling council area in Scotland, just north of the city of Stirling.

Overlooked by the National Wallace Monument, it lies on the Allan Water, a northern tributary of the River Forth, built largely on the well-wooded slopes of the Westerton and Airthrey estates, sheltered by the Ochil Hills from the north and east winds. Most of the town is to the east of the river; the bridge is part of the A9, Scotland's longest road, while the railway line and the M9 pass to the west of the river. Bridge of Allan railway station is on the electrified Edinburgh to Dunblane Line and is accessible by train from Stirling in under 5 minutes as well as London in under six hours.

== History ==
During the Iron Age, the local people of the area were known as the Maeatae and it was they who constructed a powerful hillfort nearby. The early village consisted of seven small clachans: Bridge End, Kierfield, Old Lecropt, Pathfoot, Logie, Corntown and the Milne of Airthrey. The villages were very separate and the villagers lived in the small world of their own communities.

The site occupied by modern Bridge of Allan stretches from the clachan of Logie across the Allan Water to the University of Stirling. It was first mentioned in a charter granted by King David I. The charter was written in connection with a dispute between the nuns of North Berwick and the monks at Dunfermline Abbey over the tithes of Airthrey and Corntown. It is un-dated, but had been granted by 1146.

A hog's back, narrow, stone bridge was built to replace the old ford across the River Allan in 1520. It rose sharply from the riverbank and dipped steeply at the other side. Soon after a few cottages began to appear around the ends of the bridge and an embryonic Bridge of Allan slowly formed. In the woods above the bridge, a mine opened. This was worked from around 1550, and quantities of copper, silver and gold were extracted.

By the middle of the seventeenth century, the Airthrey Estate had passed to relatives of the Marquess of Montrose, the Grahams. James Graham rose for the king during the Wars of the Three Kingdoms, and in 1645 as the army of the Duke of Argyll passed through the Airthrey estate on its way to the battle of Kilsyth they burned down the manor house.

The Jacobites were in Bridge of Allan in 1745, where three hundred highlanders set up a roadblock on the bridge and charged a toll for its passage. One of the old toll posts is still on display on a path leading up from Henderson Street.

In the early 19th century the town was little developed and typified by small, straw-roofed cottages.

Major Alexander Henderson, the Laird of Westerton, drew up plans of how he wanted the village to be laid out in 1850, envisaging spacious streets with pleasure grounds in the woods. He also erected a fountain in Market Street. It was at this time that many handsome stone villas were built on wide thoroughfares, with practically every second house becoming a lodging house as Bridge of Allan became a renowned spa town, especially during the boom years of hydropathic establishments. Among the visitors was Robert Louis Stevenson who visited annually during his youth.

In 1870, Bridge of Allan became an independent Police Burgh with its own Provost. In the same year Laurence and Edmund Pullar moved to Bridge of Allan to open the huge Keirfield Works on the south-west of the town. This huge factory served as a major satellite for his father, John Pullar's firm of J. Pullar & Son later known as "Pullars of Perth". The Bridge of Allan plant serviced all of central and southern Scotland, whilst Perth served the north. The Pullars also built extensive housing schemes from the 1880s onwards to house the growing workforce. The Pullars also bought Westerton House from Major Henderson to use as their home.

The Museum Hall was built by the trustees of John Macfarlane of Coneyhill in 1887, originally as the Macfarlane Museum and Art Gallery. In its use as a concert venue it once played host to the Beatles in 1963 but was subsequently allowed to fall into disuse and considerable disrepair. It has now been redeveloped for residential use.

By 1900, the town had four churches: the parish church still linked to the Church of Scotland; two United Free Churches, Chalmers Church and Trinity Church; and St Saviour's, Scottish Episcopal Church. The town is currently served by Bridge of Allan Parish Church, Church of Scotland, and St Saviour's Scottish Episcopal Church.

Pullar Memorial Park was created in 1923 to house the Bridge of Allan War Memorial to those lost in the First World War. It was erected by the industrialist Edmund Pullar son of John Pullar, creators of Pullars of Perth.

Bridge of Allan was formerly administered by firstly Stirlingshire County Council and then Central Regional Council.

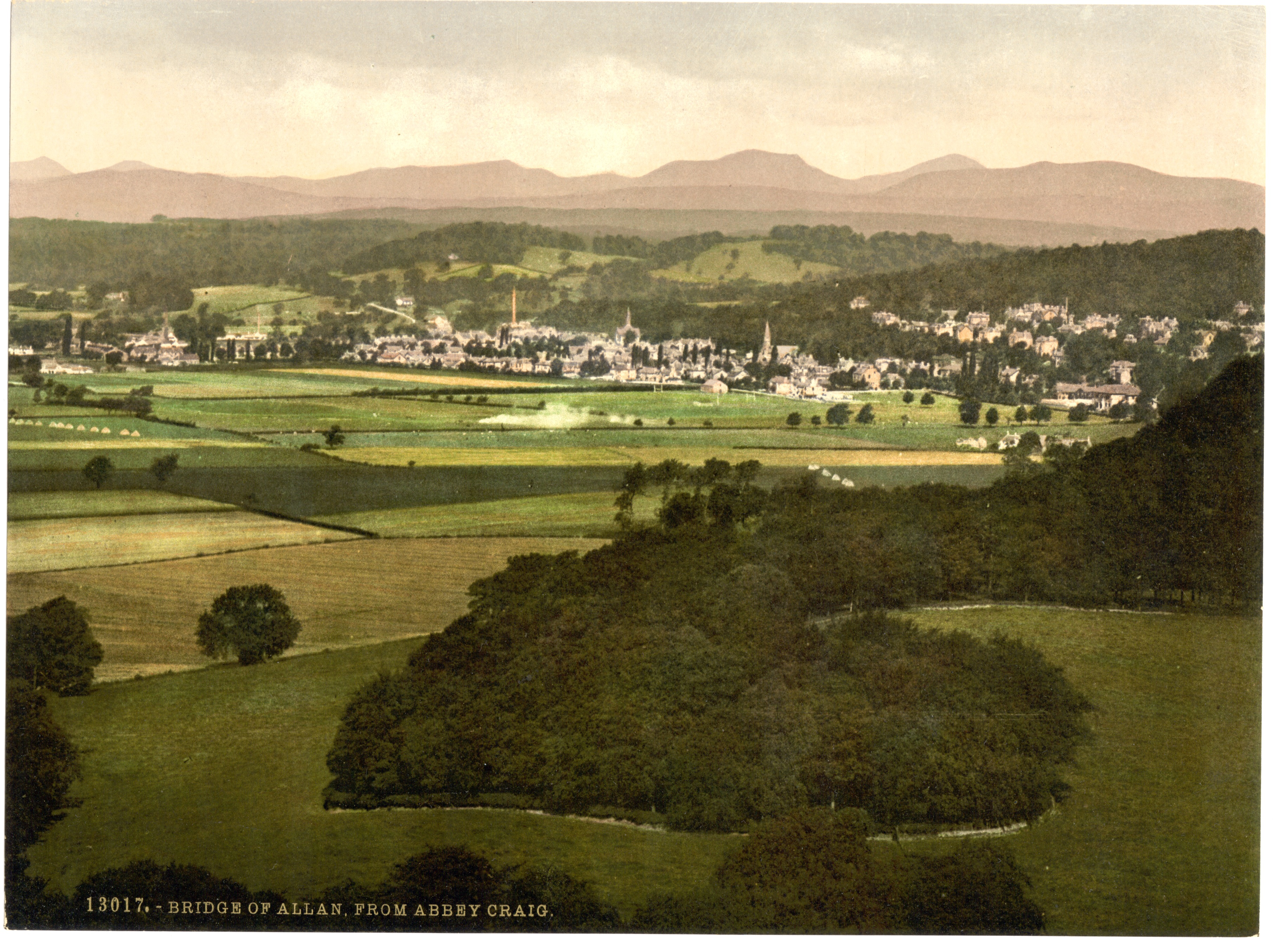
Bridge of Allan, ca. 1890 - 1900.

== Strathallan Games ==
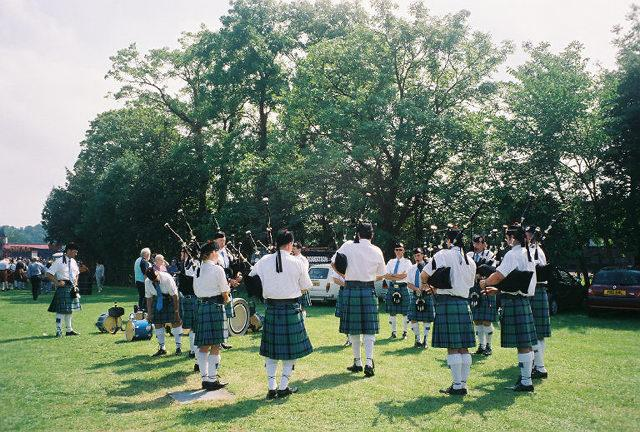
Pipe band practicing at the Strathallan Games in 2004.

The Sunday following the first Saturday in August is usually the date for the Strathallan Games.

Founded at Westerton in 1852 by Major Henderson, the games attract hundreds of athletes, pipe bands and highland dancers.

== Notable residents ==
- General Sir James Edward Alexander (1803-1885), lived at Westerton
- William Gordon (1866-1941), recipient of the Victoria Cross
- Frederick Pullar (1875-1901) meteorologist remembered for his surveys of Scottish lochs
- Laurence Pullar (1837-1926) and his brother Edmund Pullar (1848-1926), industrialists
- Edmund Pullar (1848-1926) industrialist, creator of Pullar Memorial Park and Bridge of Allan War Memorial, lived and died at Westerton
- William York Macgregor (1855-1923) landscape artist
- Judy Murray (born 1959), tennis player and coach, was born in Bridge of Allan
- Captain James A. King (1832-1899) steamship captain and government official in Hawaii, was born in Bridge of Allan
- Donald Ewen Cameron (1901-1967) founding director of the Allan Memorial Institute and president of the World Psychiatric Association, was born in Bridge of Allan
- Alan Rankine (1958-2023), musician and record producer, best known as keyboardist and guitarist for rock band the Associates, was born in Bridge of Allan
- Andy Taylor (born 1955), cricketer
- Lauren Mayberry (born 1987) Singer, Musician, Songwriter
- Finn Russell (born 1992) - Scotland Rugby and British & Irish Lions international fly-half

== Churches ==
There are two churches in the village, built opposite each other at the junction of Keir Street and Fountain Road. These are St Saviour's Episcopal church built in 1857, and the Church of Scotland's Bridge of Allan Parish Church, notable for some of its internal fittings being designed by Charles Rennie Mackintosh in 1904. In 2004, there were two Church of Scotland congregations; Chalmers Church on Henderson Street, which has since been turned into flats, and Holy Trinity, on Keir Street. These churches united to form Bridge of Allan Parish Church, in what was the Holy Trinity building on Keir Street.

The current minister of Bridge of Allan Parish Church is Rev'd Dan Harper, who was ordained and inducted to the charge in January 2016. He also serves as chaplain to both Bridge of Allan Primary, and Wallace High School.

Outside Bridge of Allan, on the A9 road to Dunblane, is Lecropt Kirk (also Church of Scotland). Historically, this church served the entirely rural parish of Lecropt, west of Bridge of Allan.

== Community ==
Bridge of Allan has various active volunteer and community groups. In 2022, The Friends of Bridge of Allan were awarded The Queen's Award for Voluntary Service for service to the community and Discover Bridge of Allan was established as a community development trust with a focus on community wealth building, sustainability and inclusivity.

== Film and television ==
In May 2019, the Mine Wood was used in filming for the fifth season of the STARZ series Outlander that stars Scottish actor Sam Heughan and Caitriona Balfe.
