= List of provosts of Perth =

The is a list of provosts of Perth. Perth is a city in Scotland, and the role of provost is similar to that of a mayor in many other countries.

== History ==
The Merchant Guild of Perth was chartered in 1210, and the post of provost may have originated at this point. The first holder whose name is known is John Mercer, who served in 1368.

Until 1975, the post was Lord Provost of Perth, and ranked second in precedence after the Lord Provost of Edinburgh. With the reorganisation of local government, it became Provost of Perth and Kinross.

== List of Provosts ==
1368: John Mercer
Laurence Spence
William Mercer
Andrew de Martyn
John de Pitscottie
1465: Andrew Charteris
1471: Robert Donyng
Andrew de Martyn
Richard de Strathearn
Alexander Bunch
Thomas Peebles
Robert Mercer
Walter Ireland
Patrick Wells

1500: Patrick Wells
Robert Mercer
Andrew Charteris
John Charteris
Alexander Tyre, of Busbie
Andrew Bunch
1504: Alexander Blair
1509: John Donyng
1521: Patrick Charteris
1523: Alexander M'Breck
William, Lord Ruthven
Oliver Maxton
John Christison
William Patullo
1544: Patrick Ruthven
1584: Patrick, Master of Ruthven
Sir William Murray, of Tullibardine
William, Earl of Gowrie
John, Earl of Montrose
John, Earl of Atholl
James Hepburn
James, Earl of Gowrie
John, Earl of Gowrie

1600: David Murray, afterwards Lord Scone
James Adamson
Viscount Stormont
Alexander Peebles
Robert Arnot
Andrew Gray
Andrew Grant
Andrew Butter
John Paterson
1664: Sir Patrick Threipland
1666: George Threipland
Archibald Christie
Andrew Jackson
Patrick Hay
Robert Lauder
John Glas
Robert Smyth
George Oliphant
James Cree
David Murray
Patrick Davidson

1700: George Oliphant
Patrick Davidson
1704: Alexander Robertson
1706: James Cree
James Brown
William Austen
Robert Robertson
Patrick Hay
William Ferguson
Colin Brown
Patrick Crie
John Robertson
William Stuart
William Gray
John Stuart
Alexander Simpson
George Fechney
1784: Thomas Marshall
1785: Thomas Marshall
William Alison
John Caw
Alexander Fechney
James Ramsay
Thomas Black
1800: Thomas Hay Marshall
1801: Thomas Hay Marshall
1802: John Caw
1803: John Caw
1804: Thomas Hay Marshall
1805: Thomas Hay Marshall
1806: John Caw
1807: John Caw
1808: Laurence Robertson
1809: Laurence Robertson
1810: Robert Ross
1811: Robert Ross
1812: Laurence Robertson
1813: Laurence Robertson
1814: Robert Ross
1815: Robert Ross
1816: Laurence Robertson
1817: Laurence Robertson
1818: David Morison
1819: David Morison
1820: Robert Ross
1821: Robert Ross
1822: Patrick Gilbert Stewart
1823: Patrick Gilbert Stewart
1824: Robert Ross
1825: Robert Ross
1825: Patrick Gilbert Stewart
1826: Patrick Gilbert Stewart
1827: Robert Ross
1828: Robert Ross
1829: Patrick Gilbert Stewart
1830: Patrick Gilbert Stewart
1839: David Greig
1841: David Greig
1842: Charles Graham Sidney
1862: Sir David Ross
1867: John Pullar
1873: Andrew Graham
1877: Thomas Richardson
1880: Kirkwood Hewat
1890: George Wilson
1893: John Dewar
1899: David Macgregor
1902: Thomas Love
1909: Duncan Macnab
1912: Charles Scott
1919: Archibald Ure Wotherspoon
1922: John Dewar
1924: Thomas Dempster
1932: Thomas Hunter
1935: Robert Nimmo
1945: John Ure Primrose
1954: John Buchan
John T. Young
1963: Robert Ritchie
1966: David Kinnear Thomson
1972: Alexander Cross
1975: Norman Renfrew
John Mathieson
1988: Alexander Murray
1992: Jean McCormack
1996: John Culliven
1999: Mike O'Malley
2003: Bob Scott
2007: John Hulbert
2012: Liz Grant
2017: Dennis Melloy
2022: Xander McDade
