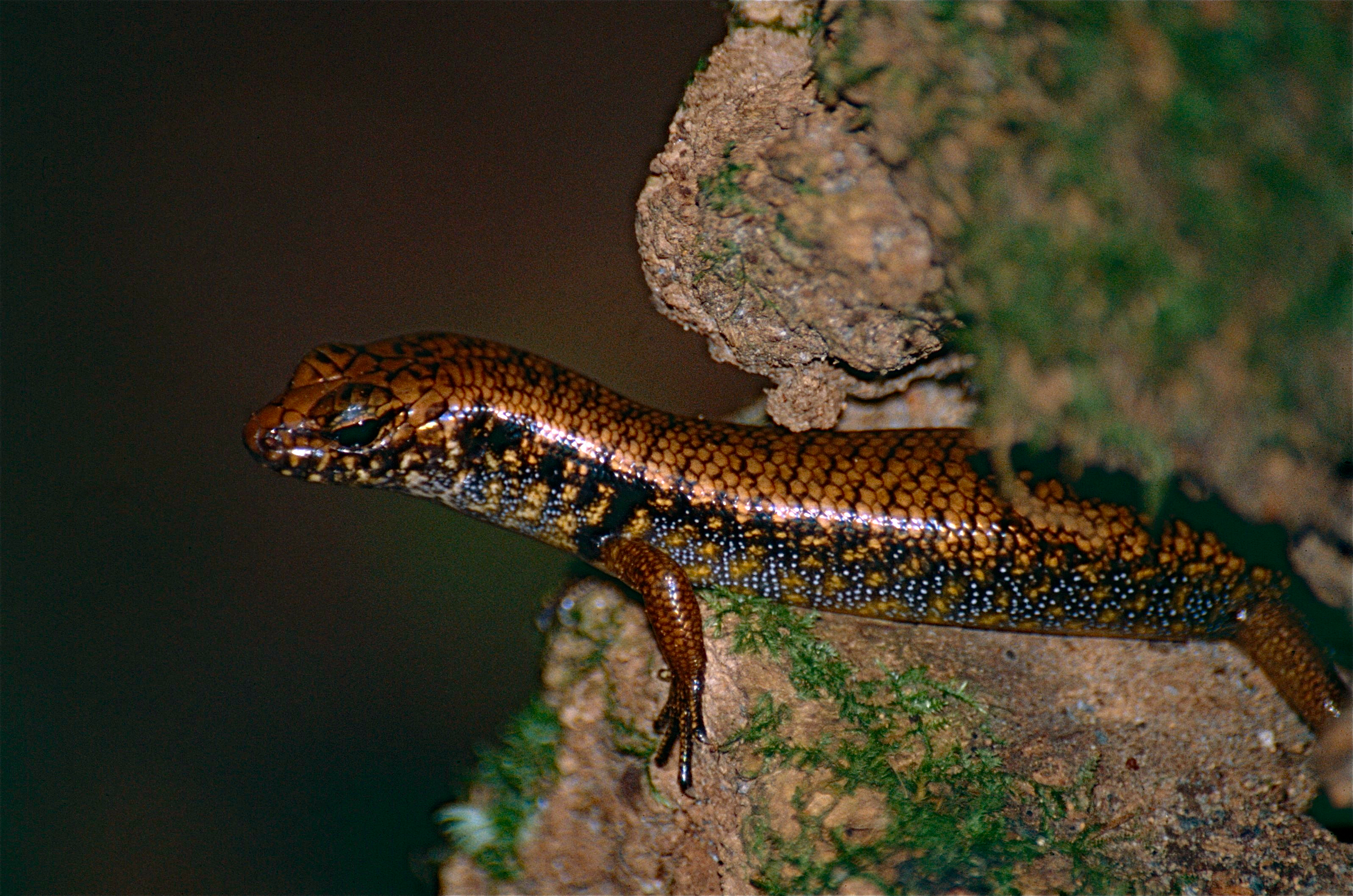
- Murray's skink

Conservation status
- Least Concern (IUCN 3.1)

Scientific classification
- Kingdom: Animalia
- Phylum: Chordata
- Class: Reptilia
- Order: Squamata
- Family: Scincidae
- Genus: Silvascincus
- Species: S. murrayi

Binomial name
- Silvascincus murrayi (Boulenger, 1887)

Synonyms
- Lygosoma murrayi Boulenger 1887; Concinnia murrayi (Boulenger, 1887); Eulamprus murrayi (Boulenger, 1887); Karma murrayi (Boulenger, 1887); Sphenomorphus murrayi (Boulenger, 1887); Lygosoma tamburinensis Lönnberg & Andersson, 1915; Lygosoma (Hinulia) tenuis intermedius Kinghorn, 1932

= Silvascincus murrayi =

Species of lizard

Silvascincus murrayi, also known commonly as the blue-speckled forest-skink and Murray's skink, is a species of lizard in the subfamily Sphenomorphinae of the family Scincidae. The species is native to New South Wales and Queensland in Australia.

== Etymology ==
The specific name, murrayi, is in honor of Canadian oceanographer, John Murray.

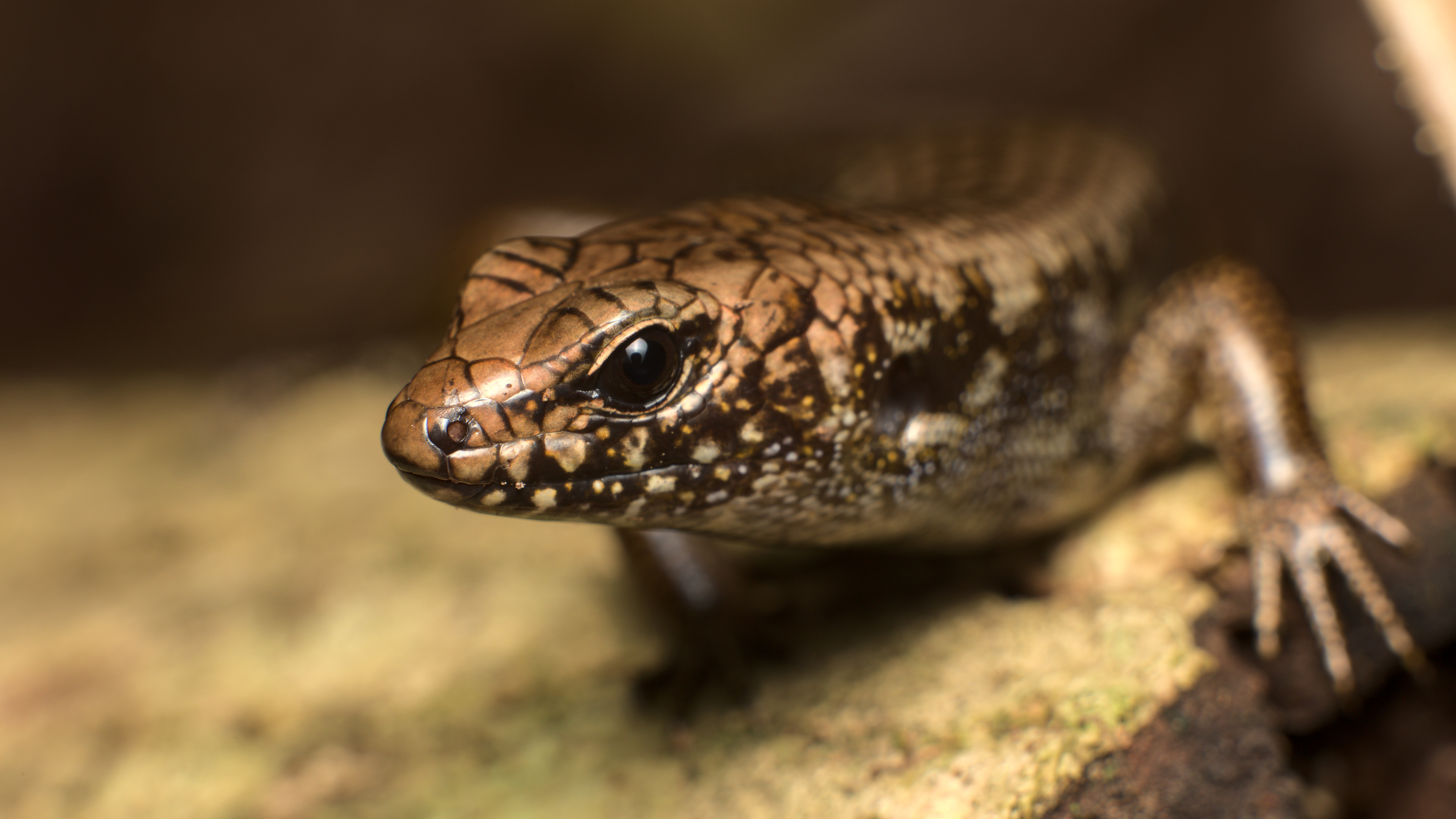
Blue-speckled forest-skink at Greene's Falls, Mount Glorious

== Description ==
Adults of Silvascincus murrayi have an average snout-to-vent length (SVL) of about 11 cm (4.3 in). The body is robust. Dorsally, it is golden brown to coppery brown, with black scale edges and black flecks. The flanks are black with yellow dots and fine bluish white speckles. Ventrally, it is pale yellow.

== Geographic distribution ==
Silvascincus murrayi is found in extreme eastern Australia, in northeastern New South Wales and southeastern Queensland.

== Habitat ==
The preferred natural habitat of Silvascincus murrayi is forest.

== Reproduction ==
The mode of reproduction of Silvacincus murrayi has been described as viviparous and as ovoviviparous. Litter size is three to five neonates.
