= Laurence Pullar =

19th-century Scottish businessman (1838–1926)

Laurence Pullar FRSE FRGS FRSGS LLD (1838–1926) was a 19th-century Scottish businessman, geographer and philanthropist. A close friend of Sir John Murray he appears to have done much to fund and/or underwrite the cost of the Challenger Expedition.

== Life ==
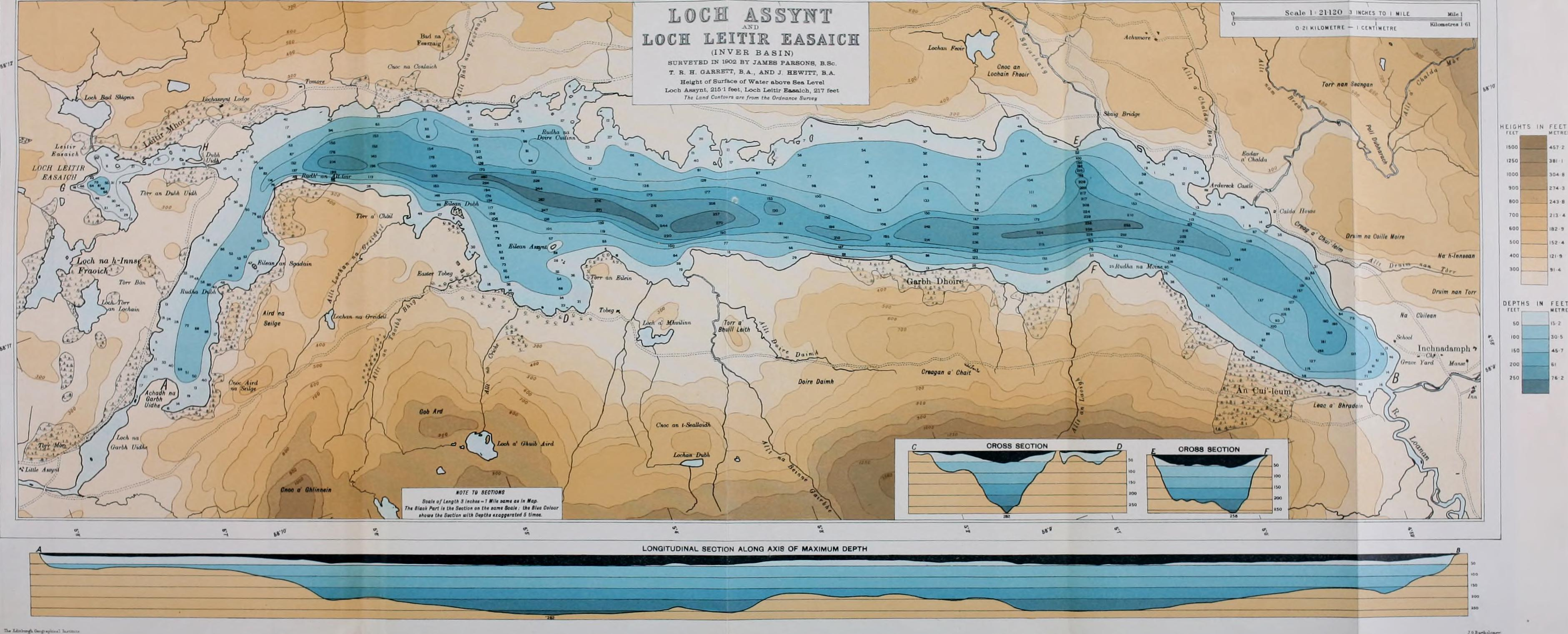
Bathymetrical Survey of Loch Assynt by Laurence Pullar, 1885

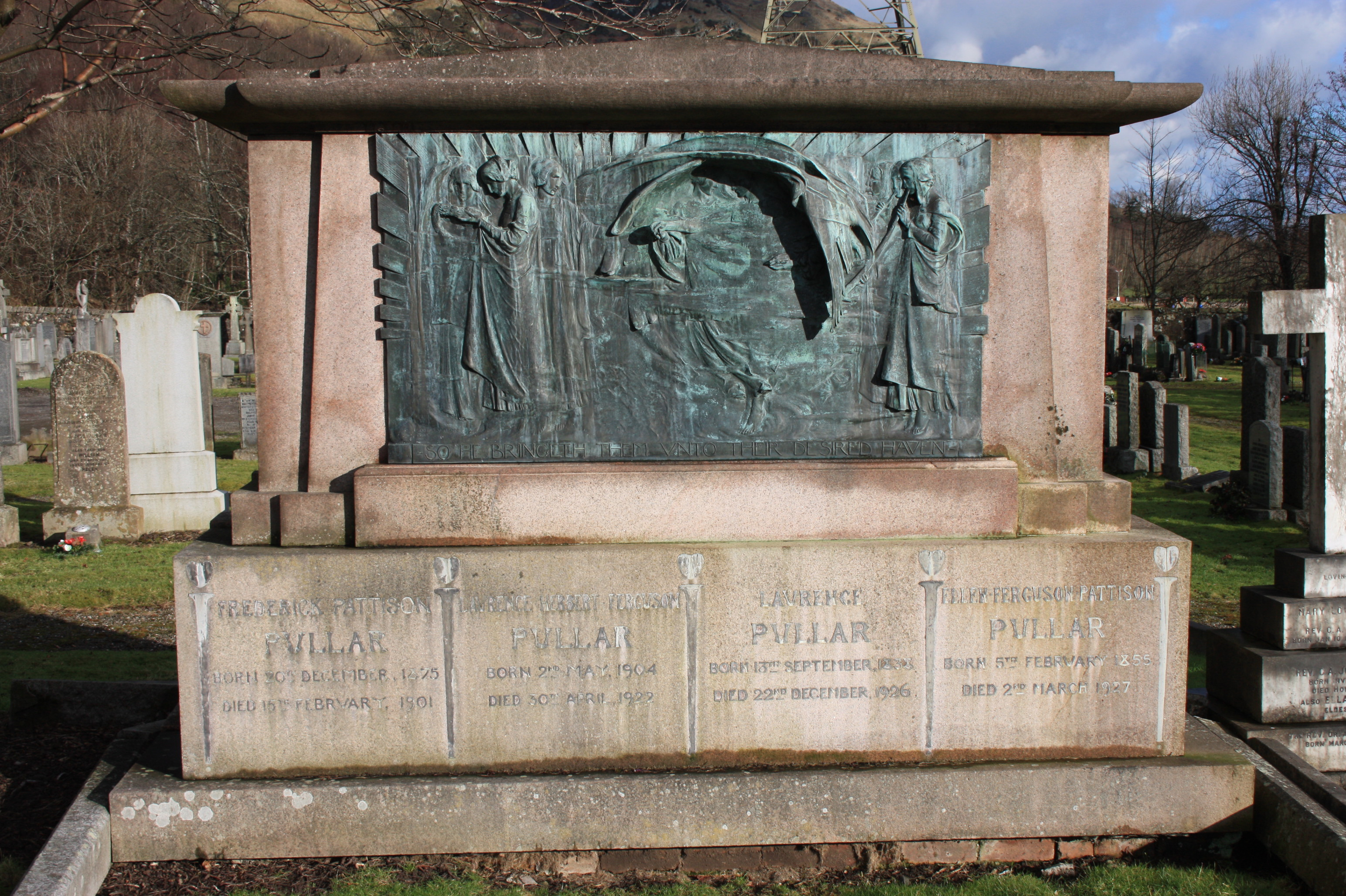
The Pullar Memorial, Logie Kirkyard

He was born on 13 September 1838 at 36 Mill Street in Perth the son of John Pullar (1803–1878) a dyer who later founded Pullars of Perth and who was Provost of Perth 1867 to 1873. He later became a principal partner in the company, and ran the huge Keirfield Manufacturing Works on the south side of Bridge of Allan, assisted by his younger brother Edmund Pullar.

A keen amateur geographer, Pullar's name attaches to an impressive bathymetric chart of Loch Assynt dated 1885, and he appears to have been a competent surveyor and draughtsman. In this task he appears to have utilised the same equipment as later used by Sir John Murray and entitled by Sir John "Pullar's Sounding Machine".

In 1895 Sir John Murray awarded him a Challenger Medal for his contributions to the Challenger Expedition. The Medal reads "in recognition of his generosity in the promotion of scientific research".

In 1897 Pullar funded the four year survey of Scottish fresh water lochs by Sir John Murray, but on condition that Murray employed his son, Frederick, on the project (who proved more than able). The study resulted in the publication of the "Bathymetrical Survey of Scottish Fresh-Water Lochs" (1908).

In 1903 he was elected a Fellow of the Royal Society of Edinburgh. His proposers were Sir John Murray, Alexander Buchan, George Chrystal and Sir Arthur Mitchell.

He died in Bridge of Allan on 22 December 1926 and was buried in Logie Kirkyard, east of Stirling with his son Frederick Pullar and other family members. The double sided memorial has a bronze by sculptor George Frampton.

== Family ==
He was married to Ellen Ferguson Pattison. Their children included Frederick Pullar tragically drowned in 1901.

Laurence was the younger brother of Sir Robert Pullar. He was also the brother of James Frederick Pullar.
