= John Pullar =

19th-century Scottish businessman

John Pullar (22 April 1803 – 16 December 1878) was a 19th-century Scottish businessman, and founder of J. Pullar and Sons (later J & J Pullar Ltd and Pullars of Perth). He went into local politics in later life, becoming Provost of Perth. He was the patriarch of the Pullar dynasty which spawned a number of notable figures in Scottish history.

== Life ==
Pullar was born on 22 April 1803 at Pomarium in Perth, the son of Robert Pullar (1782–1835), a cloth manufacturer, and his wife, Elizabeth Black (died 1857).

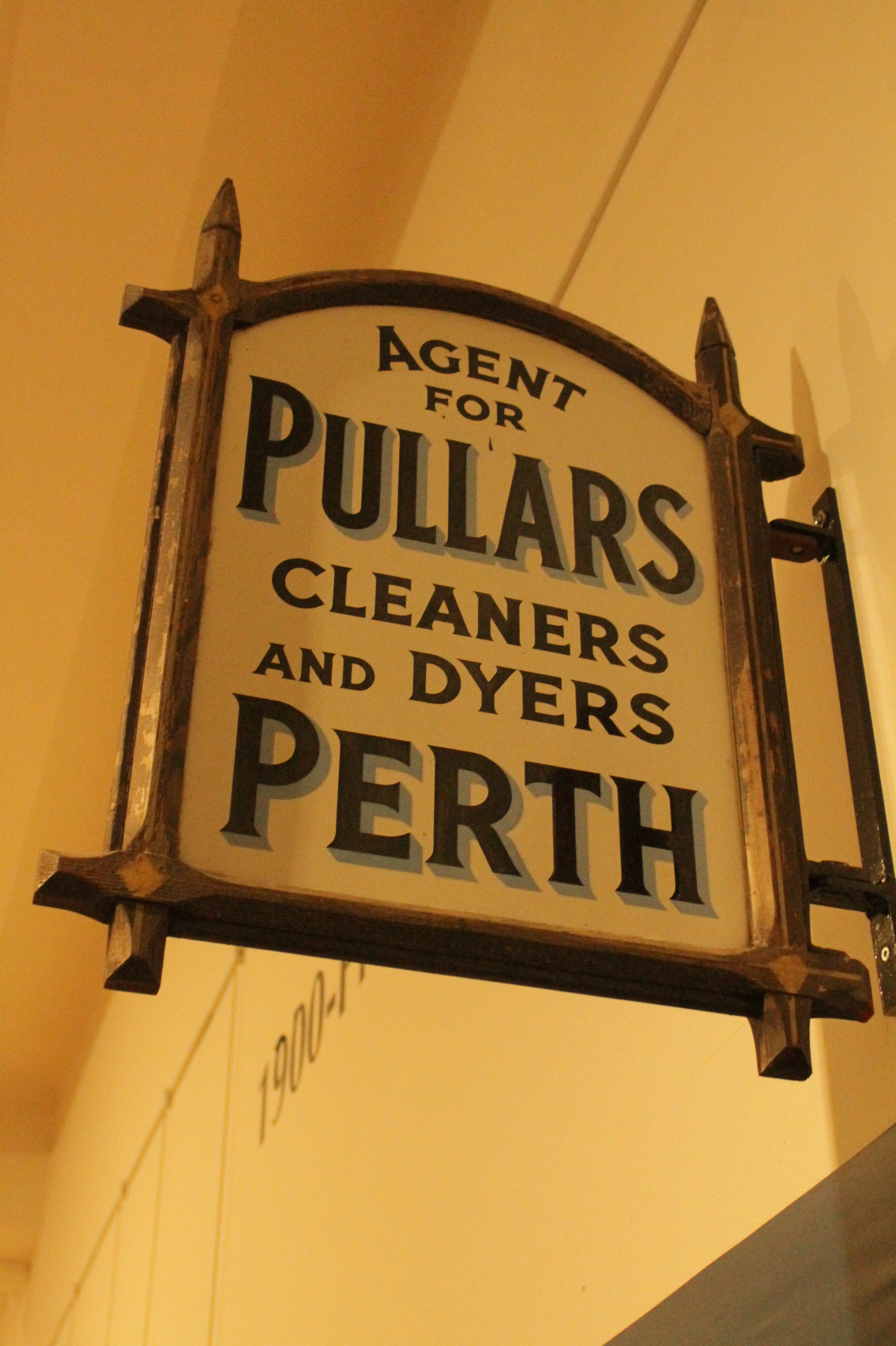
Shop sign for Pullars of Perth, Perth Museum

In 1824 he set up his own dyeworks at Burt's Close in Perth with six employees. His premises dyed cloth for his father and provided dyeing and laundry services for the public. In 1828 he relocated to 36 Mill Street to distance himself from neighbours and have an area of expansion with good water supply. The firm benefitted from the arrival of trains in 1847. In 1851 they exhibited at the Great Exhibition in London and received the patronage of Queen Victoria in 1852, thereafter being by appointment to the Queen.

By 1856 they employed over 100 persons and had over thirty premises gathering clothes for cleaning.

In 1865 the Mill Street premises was rebuilt and renamed the North British Dyeworks. The building remains and is now known as "Pullar House" and houses Perth and Kinross Council.

In 1867/8 Pullars began dry cleaning (the first dry cleaning service in Scotland) due to his son James marriage to Adelgunde Spindler, daughter of Wilhelm Spindler who invented the benzene method of dry cleaning. John (already 63 years old) left this element of the business wholly in the hands of James. Robert Pringle handled the remainder of the business whilst John took a new role as Provost of Perth, serving (as a radical Liberal) 1867 to 1873.

During his time as Provost he brought improvements to the railway system and various city improvement schemes. He was concurrently a Director of the Bank of Scotland, Director of the Caledonian Railway Company and Trustee and Director of Perth Royal Infirmary. He was a Deacon of the Perth Baptist Church and an advocate of the temperance movement.

== Family ==
In August 1826 Pullar married Mary Walker (1805–1891) of Brahan in Ross-shire.

Their nine children included four famous sons: Sir Robert Pullar, James Pullar, Edmund Pullar and Laurence Pullar. He was grandfather to Frederick Pullar

== Artistic recognition ==
Pullar was painted by John MacLaren Barclay. The portrait was copied by his in-law Walter Spindler.

== Death ==
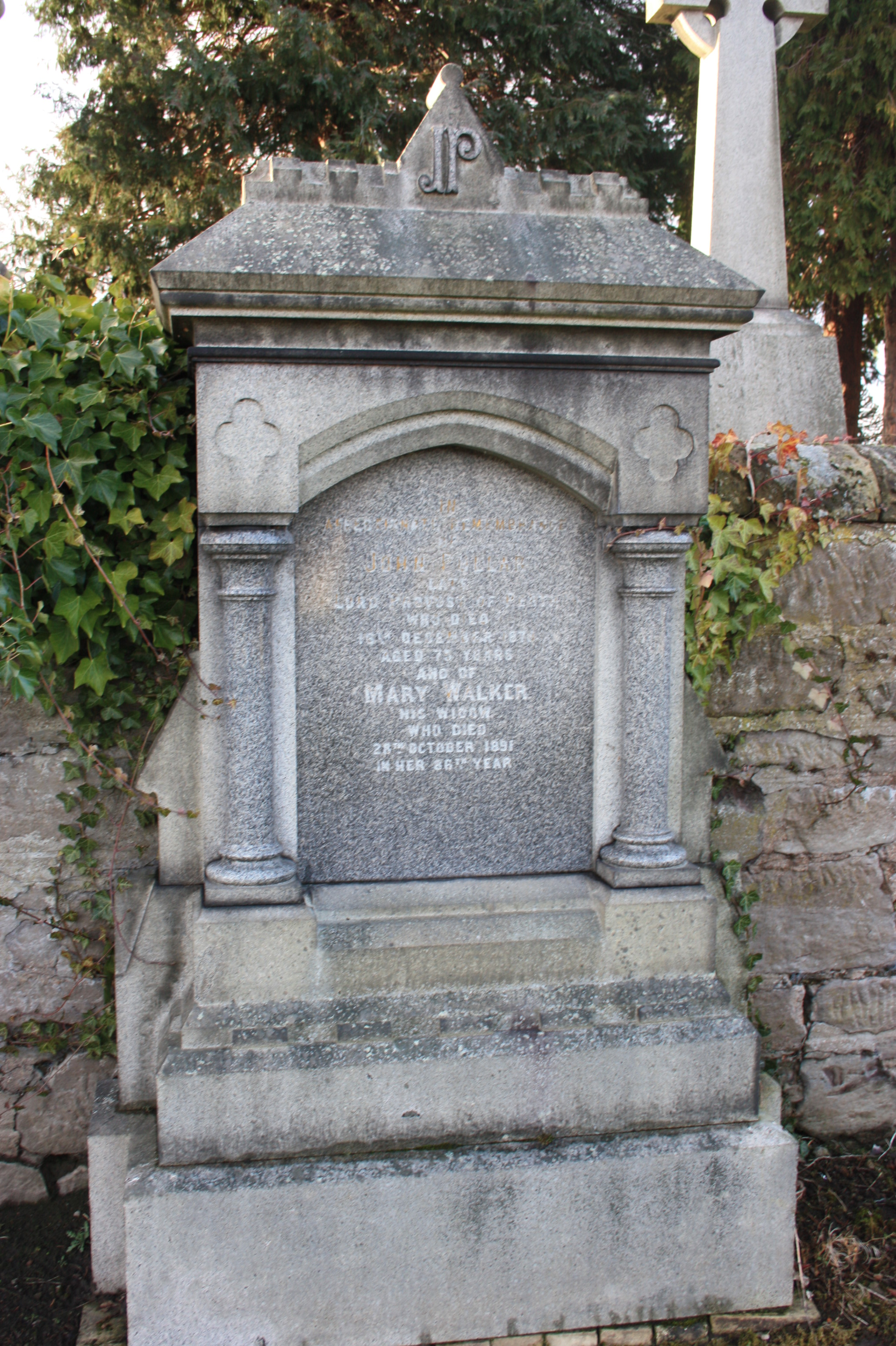
The grave of John Pullar, Wellshill Cemetery, Perth

Pullar died of a heart attack at his home at 3 St Leonards Bank on 16 December 1878 aged 75. He was one of the richest men in Scotland at the time of his death. He was buried in Wellshill Cemetery in Perth on 21 December. The grave lies on the lower half of the terraced section midway along the southmost path linking the old and new sections.

In his father's honour, sons Robert and James gifted a stained glass window, depicting Robert the Bruce's 1312 capture of Perth, in the city's Municipal Building at the very eastern end of the High Street.
