= Willie Pullar =

Scottish footballer

Personal information
- Full name: William Pullar
- Date of birth: 11 April 1900
- Place of birth: Fountainbridge, Scotland
- Date of death: 17 January 1954 (aged 53)
- Position: Outside right

Senior career*
Years	Team	Apps	(Gls)
–1921	Dalkeith Thistle		
1921–1930	Cowdenbeath	289	(45)
1930–1932	Leith Athletic	32	(2)
1932	Raith Rovers	6	(0)
- * Club domestic league appearances and goals

William Pullar (11 April 1900 – 17 January 1954) was a Scottish professional footballer who made over 290 appearances as an outside right in the Scottish League for Cowdenbeath. He also played for Leith Athletic and Raith Rovers.

== Personal life ==
Pullar served in the British Army during the First World War.

== Career statistics ==
Appearances and goals by club, season and competition
Club	Season	League			Scottish Cup		Total	
Club	Season	Division	Apps	Goals	Apps	Goals	Apps	Goals
Cowdenbeath	1921–22	Scottish Second Division	21	1	3	0	24	1
Cowdenbeath	1922–23	Scottish Second Division	31	7	1	1	32	8
Cowdenbeath	1923–24	Scottish Second Division	36	3	2	0	38	3
Cowdenbeath	1924–25	Scottish First Division	33	8	1	0	34	8
Cowdenbeath	1925–26	Scottish First Division	37	7	1	0	38	7
Cowdenbeath	1926–27	Scottish First Division	35	6	2	1	37	7
Cowdenbeath	1927–28	Scottish First Division	36	5	2	1	38	6
Cowdenbeath	1928–29	Scottish First Division	26	3	2	0	28	3
Cowdenbeath	1929–30	Scottish First Division	34	5	3	0	37	5
Cowdenbeath	Total		289	45	17	3	306	48
Leith Athletic	1930–31	Scottish First Division	20	2	1	0	21	2
Leith Athletic	1931–32	Scottish First Division	12	0	0	0	12	0
Leith Athletic	Total		32	2	1	0	33	2
Raith Rovers	1931–32	Scottish Second Division	6	0	—		6	0
Career total			327	47	18	3	345	50

== Honours ==
Cowdenbeath

- Scottish League Second Division second-place promotion: 1923–24

Individual

- Cowdenbeath Hall of Fame
