= Bill Pullar =

Profile
- Positions: End, Tackle

Personal information
- Born: c. 1926; Calgary, Alberta, Canada
- Died: March 30, 1981 (aged 54); Calgary, Alberta, Canada
- Listed height: 6 ft 2 in (1.88 m)
- Listed weight: 230 lb (104 kg)

Career history
- 1946–1956: Calgary Stampeders

Awards and highlights
- Grey Cup champion (1948)

William James Glenson Pullar (c. 1926 – March 30, 1981) was a Canadian professional football player who played for the Calgary Stampeders. He won the Grey Cup with them in 1948. Pullar previously attended and played football at McGill University for the McGill Redmen.
