= James Pullar =

James Ferguson Pullar FRSE (12 August 1835 – 19 September 1912) was a 19th-century Scottish businessman, and main partner in J & J Pullar Ltd later known as Pullars of Perth. He was the first person to introduce benzene based dry cleaning in Britain, and established one of the world's largest dry cleaning firms. Some records give his name as James Frederick Pullar.

== Life ==
Pullar was born at 36 Mill Street in Perth on 12 August 1835, the son of John Pullar (1803–1878) a dyer who went on to found J Pullar and from there Pullars of Perth. His father went on to be Provost of Perth.

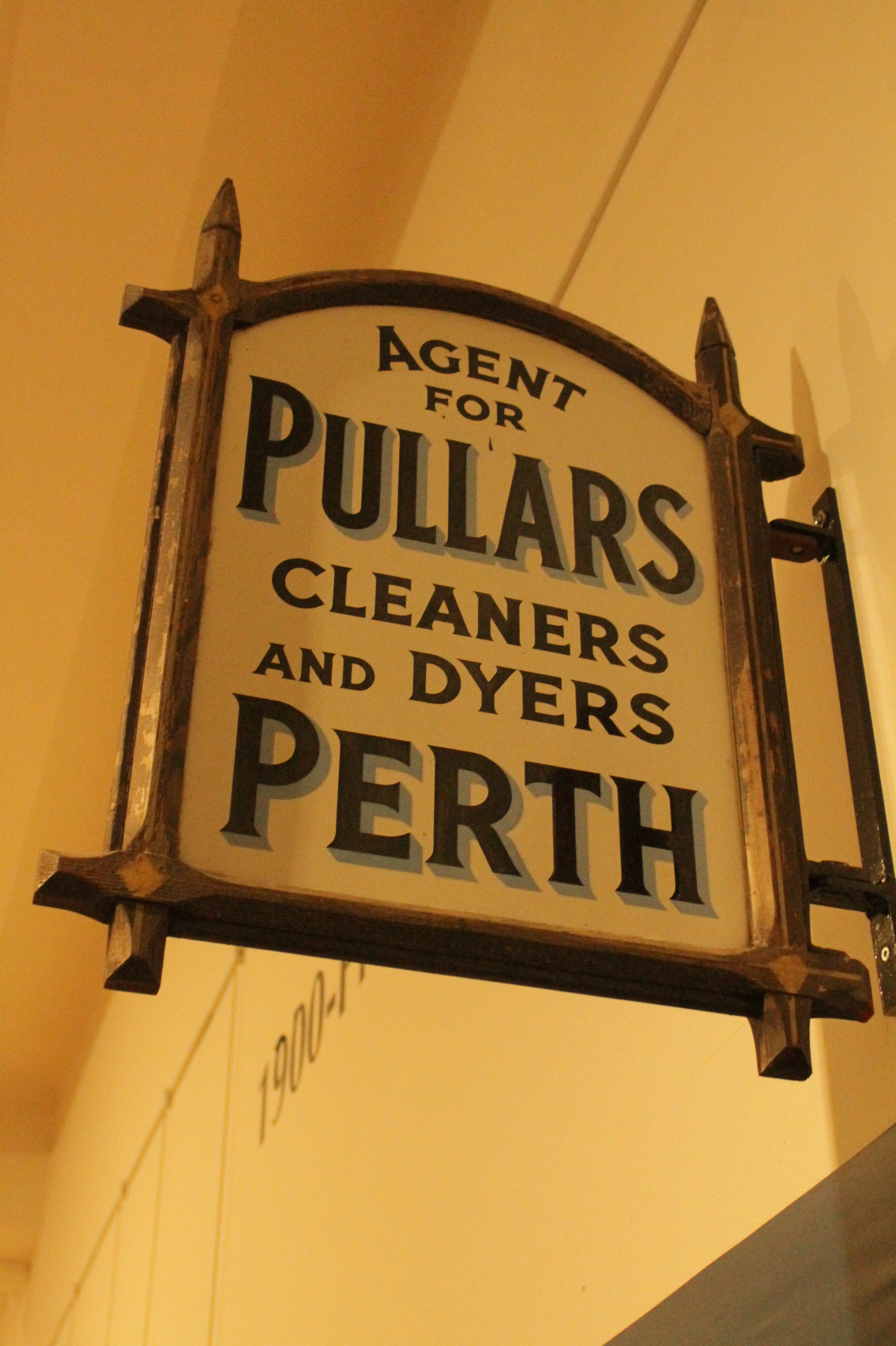
Shop sign for Pullars of Perth, Perth Museum

In 1867 he married Adelgunde Spindler (1840–1907), daughter of Wilhelm Spindler, the German inventor of benzene-based dry cleaning. He introduced dry cleaning into his existing family firm (which largely dealt with dyeing of cloth). The process quickly gained popularity and collection stations were created all over Scotland to take garments to Perth for cleaning. The Perth workforce peaked in 1909 at over 2800 persons.

In 1885 he was elected a Fellow of the Royal Society of Edinburgh. His proposers were William Carmichael McIntosh, Thomas Miller, Sir Peter Redford Scott Lang and Sir John Murray. He was the first of the Pullar brothers to be elected a Fellow.

Pullar gifted a bandstand that stood near the southern end of the North Inch during the first part of the 20th century.

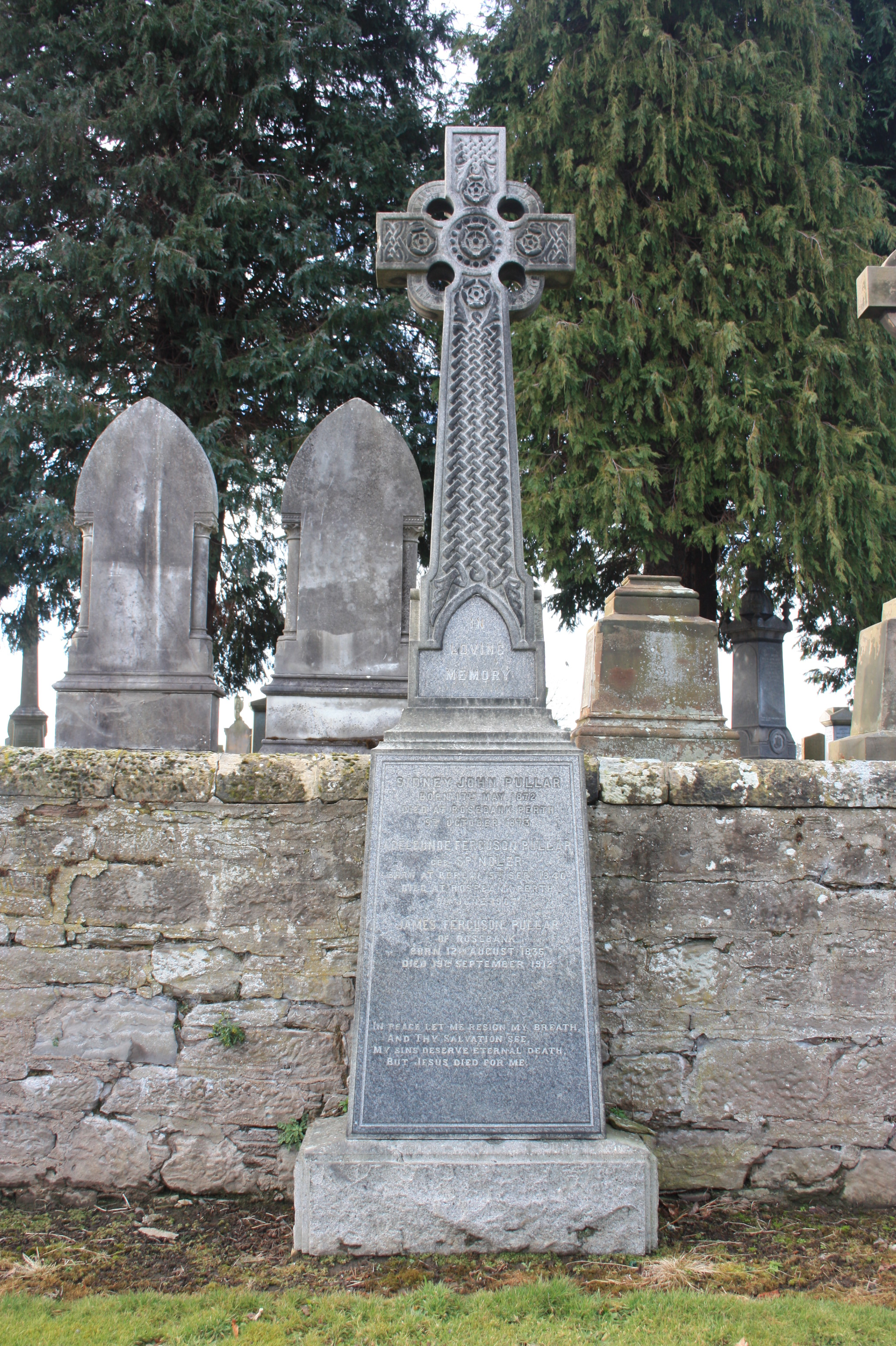
The grave of James Pullar, Wellshill Cemetery in Perth

He died on 19 September 1912. He is buried with Adelgunde next to his parents in Wellshill Cemetery in Perth, slightly north of his brother Sir Robert Pullar on the lower side of where the cemetery steps up.

== Family ==
His siblings included Laurence Pullar and Sir Robert Pullar.

He was uncle to Frederick Pullar.
