= Robert Pullar =

British politician (1828–1912)

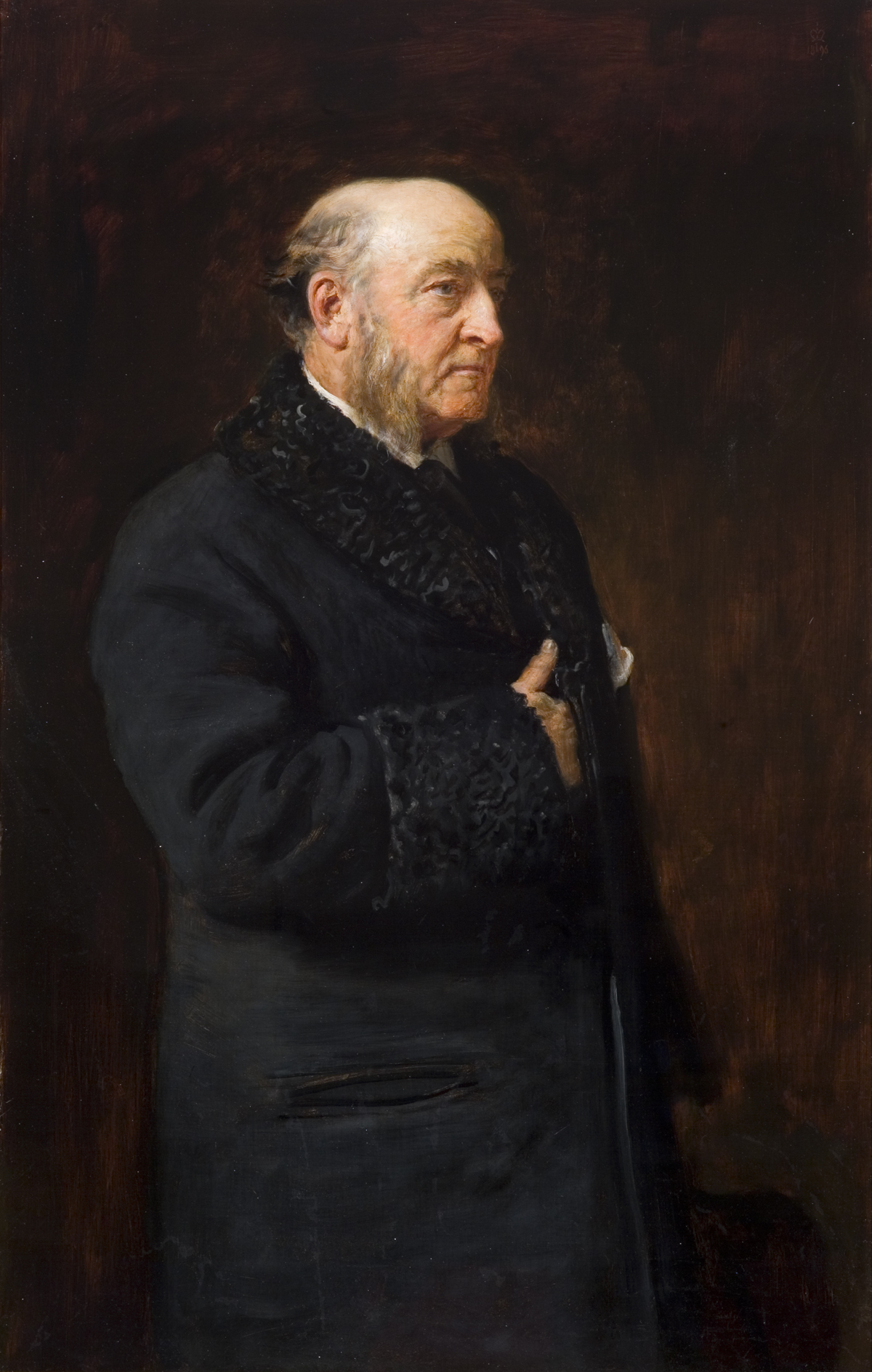
Sir Robert Pullar by John Everett Millais

Sir Robert Pullar FRSE (18 February 1828 – 9 September 1912) was a Scottish Liberal Party politician in the United Kingdom.

== Life ==
Pullar was born at Burt's Close in Perth on 18 February 1828, the eldest of nine children of John Pullar (1803–1878), a dyer, and his wife Mary Walker. His father founded the firm Pullars of Perth and was also at one point Provost of Perth. In the summer of 1828 the family moved to 36 Mill street in Perth. This was as a reaction to complaints regarding noxious smells while they were working at Burt's Close, Mill Street being further out of town. He was educated in Perth at Stewart's Academy in Atholl Street, Greig's Academy in Stormont Street, and at Perth Academy, also doing continuation classes in French and German.

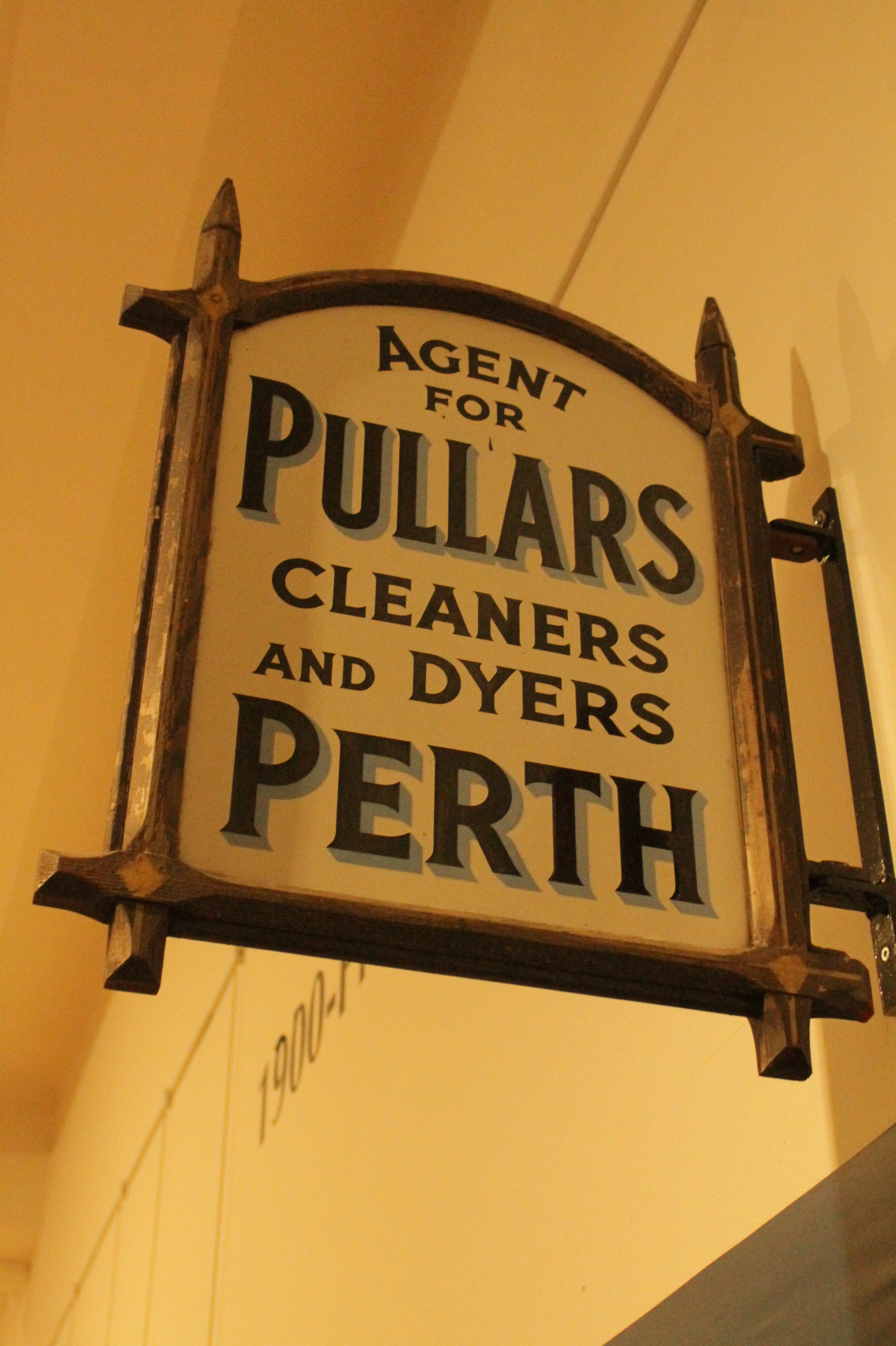
Shop sign for Pullars of Perth, Perth Museum

He was apprenticed under his father in 1841, a junior partner in 1848 and ultimately senior partner in the local family firm of Pullars Dyeworks. In 1857 the firm formed a relationship with the inventor William Perkin to be the first manufacturer to successfully introduce purple aniline dye. The firm also branched into dry cleaning, a technique he learned from Germany, establishing a plant in Tulloch in 1882. He was known as an extensive and generous donor to local charities and other local causes and a benevolent employer, although in the last year of his life there was a major strike in the firm when he refused to discuss wage rises. He was a J.P. for the County of Perth. He travelled widely in Russia, Scandinavia, America and the Middle East.

He was elected a Fellow of the Royal Society of Edinburgh in 1880. His proposers were Sir James Falshaw, William Lauder Lindsay, John Duns and James Sime. At this time he lived at 6 St Leonards Bank in Perth and ran the North British Dyeworks on Kinnoull Street. He was knighted by Queen Victoria in the 1895 Birthday Honours.

Although his family were originally Baptists he seemed to favour the Free Church and in 1900 joined the newly created United Free Church of Scotland worshipping at St Leonards Church on Marshall Place facing the South Inch.

In 1905 he received an honorary doctorate (LLD) from St Andrew's University.

He was elected unopposed at a by-election on 12 February 1907 as the Member of Parliament (MP) for Perth. In his politics he was a radical Liberal and supported free trade and Irish home rule. He stood down in January 1910. At the time of his election, he was six days short of his 79th birthday, making his possibly the oldest parliamentary debut of an MP in the 20th century. He rarely spoke in debates and was criticized by local trade unions for failing to support measures to help the unemployed.

In 1911 he received Freedom of the City of Perth.

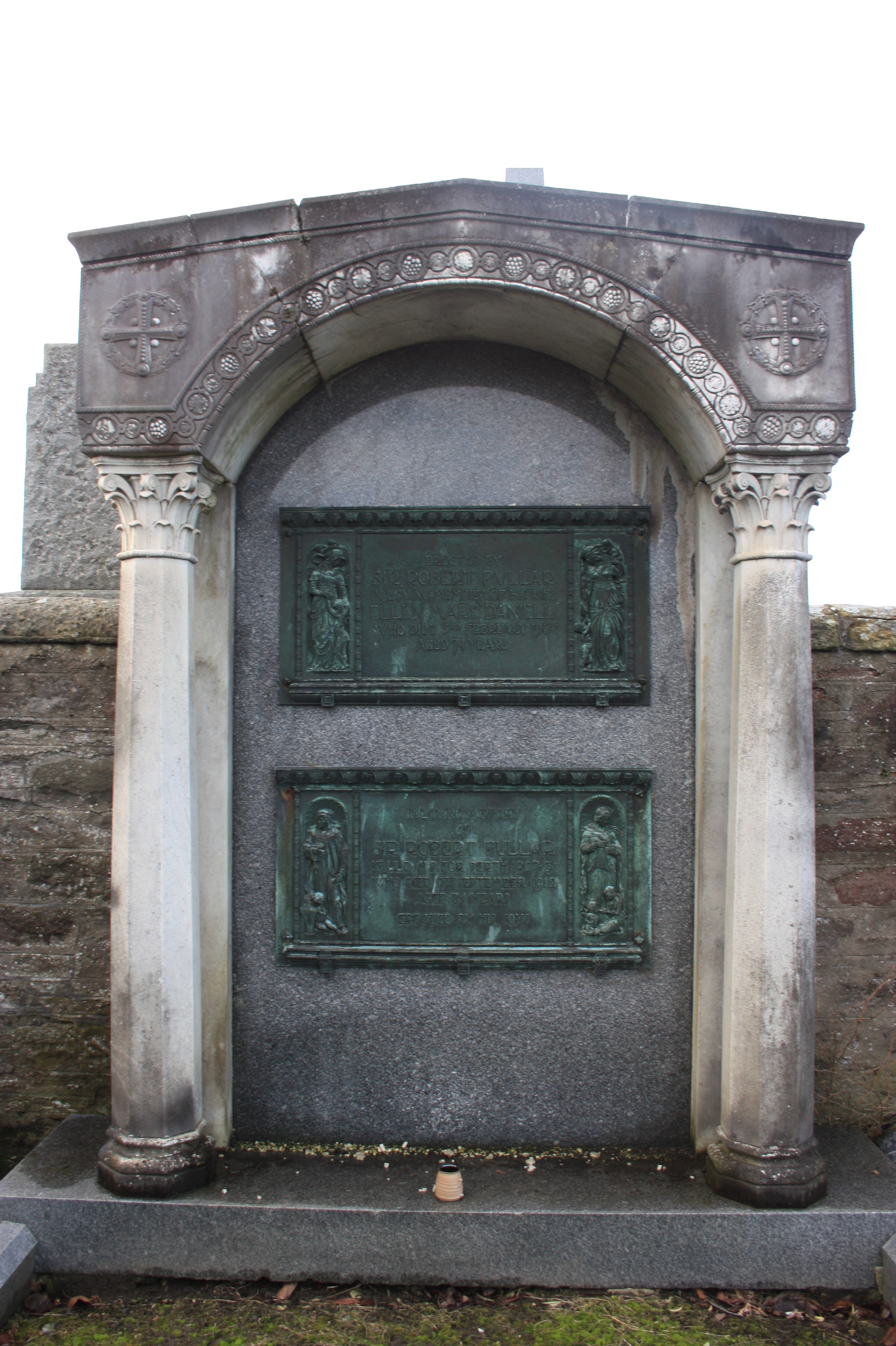
The grave of Sir Robert Pullar, Wellshill Cemetery in Perth

He died at home, "Tayside" on Isla Road, of a seizure on 9 September 1912 aged 84. He was buried with his wife at Wellshill Cemetery, Perth, close to his parents. The grave nears at the southern end of the terraced step midway across the southern east–west path.

== Family ==
He was older brother to Laurence Pullar, James Pullar and Edmund Pullar, and uncle to Frederick Pullar.

In 1859 he married Helen Mary Daniell (1829–1904), daughter of Charles Daniell of Wantage, Berkshire, England, by whom he had two sons, Rufus Daniell Pullar (1861–1917) and Albert Evans Pullar (1865–1945). Rufus and his family are buried alongside his parents.

== Artistic recognition ==
His portrait was painted by John Everett Millais.

Parliament of the United Kingdom
Preceded by Robert Wallace	Member of Parliament for Perth; 1907 – January 1910	Succeeded by Frederick Whyte
