= Frederick Pullar =

Scottish meteorologist (1875–1901)

Frederick Pattison Pullar FRSE FRGS FRSGS (20 January 1875 – 16 February 1901) was a 19th century Scottish meteorologist who served as Sir John Murray's right-hand for his short career. He is often referred to simply as Fred Pullar.

== Life ==
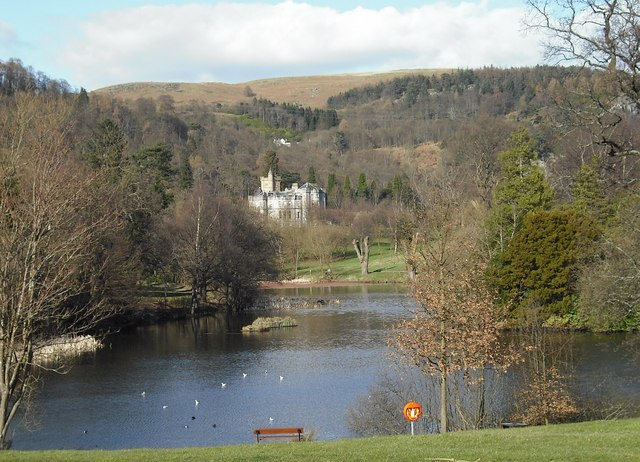
Airthrey Loch with Airthrey Castle behind

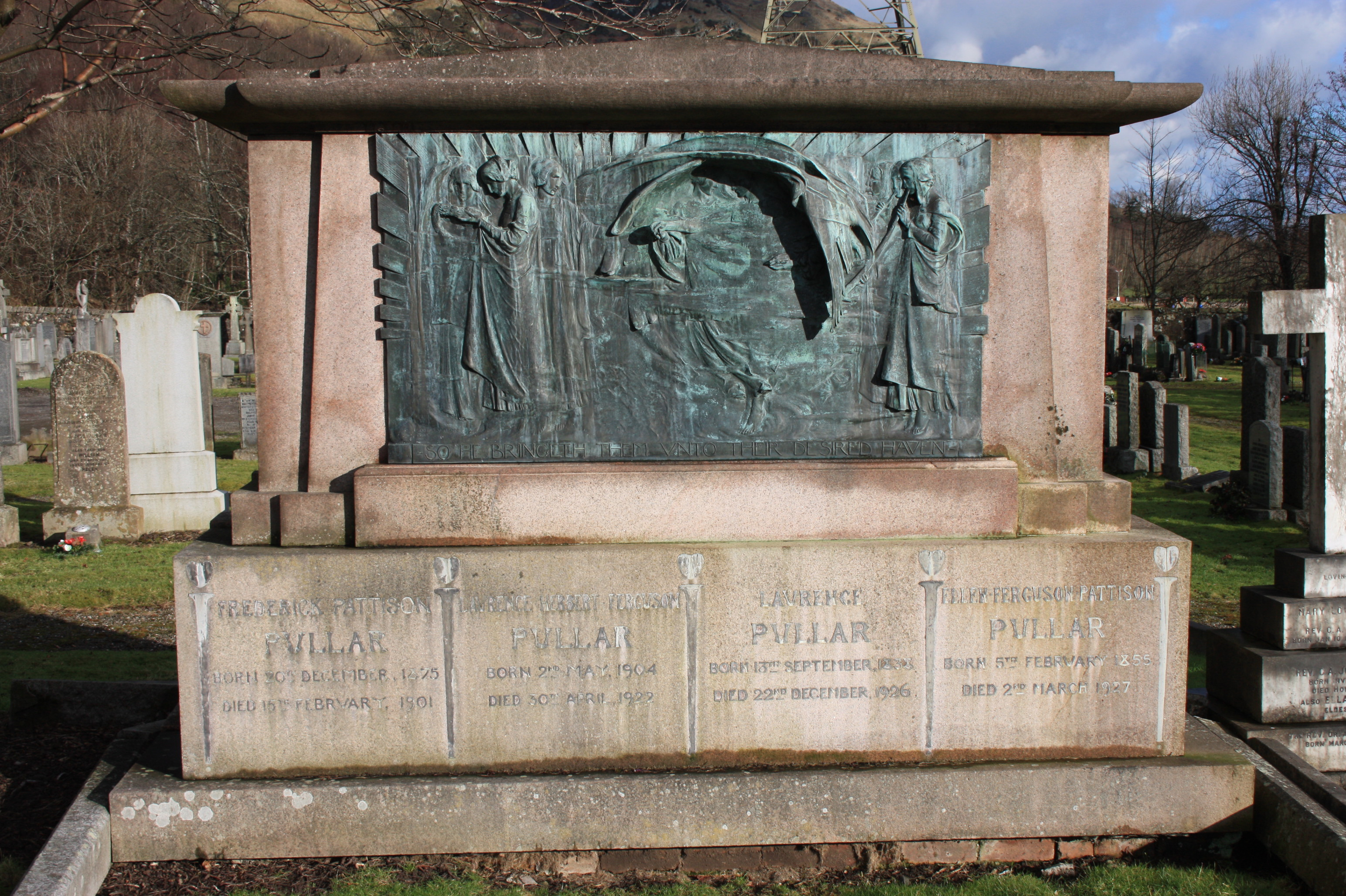
The Pullar Memorial, Logie Kirkyard

He was born in Bridge of Allan near Stirling on 20 January 1875 the son of the industrialist Laurence Pullar and his wife, Ellen Ferguson Pattison. He was educated at Stanley House School at Bridge of Allan then at the High School in Stirling. He then attended the West of Scotland Technical College in Glasgow. Around 1893 he entered the family firm of Pullars of Perth founded by his grandfather, John Pullar, in the 1820s.

In 1897 Frederick's father Laurence Pullar commissioned his friend, Sir John Murray to undertake an entire survey of all Scottish fresh water lochs. This was on condition that Sir John employed his then 22 year old son Frederick to assist in the task. However, Frederick, although having no formal university training, proved more than competent in this role. Frederick and Sir John spent over three years together, surveying 15 lochs beginning with Loch Lubnaig. In this they utilised a device known as Pullar's Sounding Machine. The sounding machine appears to have been named after the father, rather than Frederick, the father having undertaken his own highly competent bathymetrical surveys from at least 1885.

In 1901 he was elected a Fellow of the Royal Society of Edinburgh. His proposers were Sir John Murray, Alexander Buchan, Robert Munro and John Horne.

On 15 February 1901 he was skating with several hundred people on Airthrey Loch in front of Airthrey Castle, when the ice gave way. Accounts related that Pullar rescued three people and returned to rescue a young woman. Both he and the woman drowned; he was 26 years old. He is buried in Logie Churchyard, just east of Stirling. The memorial stands east of the church and was commissioned by his parents from the sculptor George Frampton. They were later buried beside him.

The results of his work and his measuring device brought about the publication of the Bathymetrical Survey of the Fresh Water Lochs of Scotland in 1910.

Airthrey Loch now forms a focal point within the grounds of Stirling University.

== Family ==
His uncles included James Frederick Pullar, Edmund Pullar and Sir Robert Pullar.
