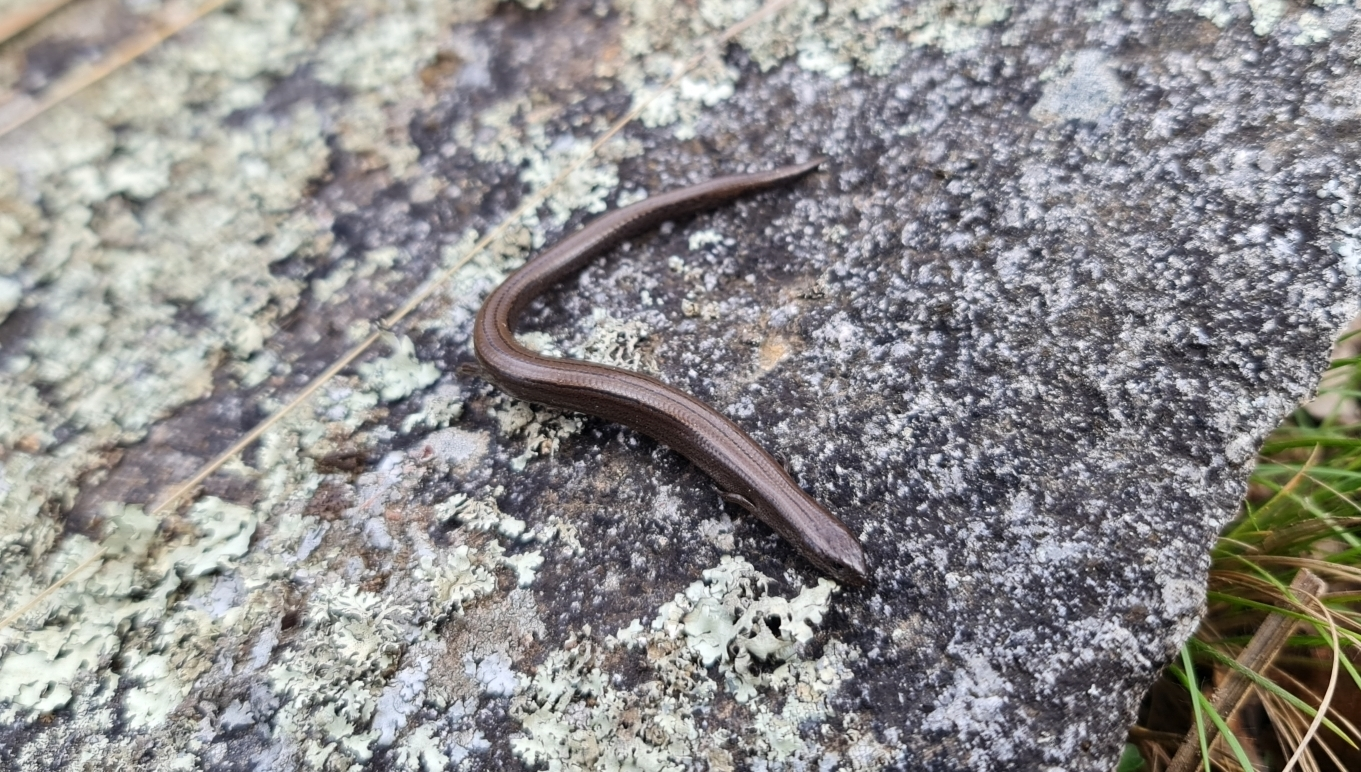

Conservation status
- Least Concern (IUCN 3.1)

Scientific classification
- Kingdom: Animalia
- Phylum: Chordata
- Class: Reptilia
- Order: Squamata
- Family: Scincidae
- Genus: Hemiergis
- Species: H. talbingoensis

Binomial name
- Hemiergis talbingoensis Copland, 1946

= Hemiergis talbingoensis =

Species of lizard

Hemiergis talbingoensis, the Eastern three-toed earless skink, is a species of skink found in New South Wales, the Australian Capital Territory and Victoria in Australia.

== Description and habitat ==
This is a secretive, litter dwelling species that occurs in cool, damp areas of dry forest and woodland around the Great Dividing Range and associated tablelands, inland slopes and coastal river valleys.

== Taxonomy, distribution and identification ==
Two subspecies have been described with H. t. davisi occurring in central and northern NSW, north from the Abercrombie River to the vicinity of Tenterfield near the border with Queensland, and the nominate form, H. t. talbingoensis occurring in southern NSW, the ACT and northeastern Victoria.

This species is closely similar to Saiphos equalis with which it overlaps in distribution in northern NSW. Both species are secretive, reduced-limb litter dwelling skinks with three toes on each limb, brown dorsum with darker flecks aligned longitudinally and a bright yellow to orange ventral coloration.

These species differ in that S. equalis has vestigial toes, while these are distinctly longer in H. talbingoensis. Hemiergis has a divided loreal scale (single in Saiphos) and prefrontal scales (absent in Saiphos). Saiphos also has a more easterly distribution, occurring in wet forest and rainforest from the tablelands to coastal areas, from eastern NSW to SE Qld.
