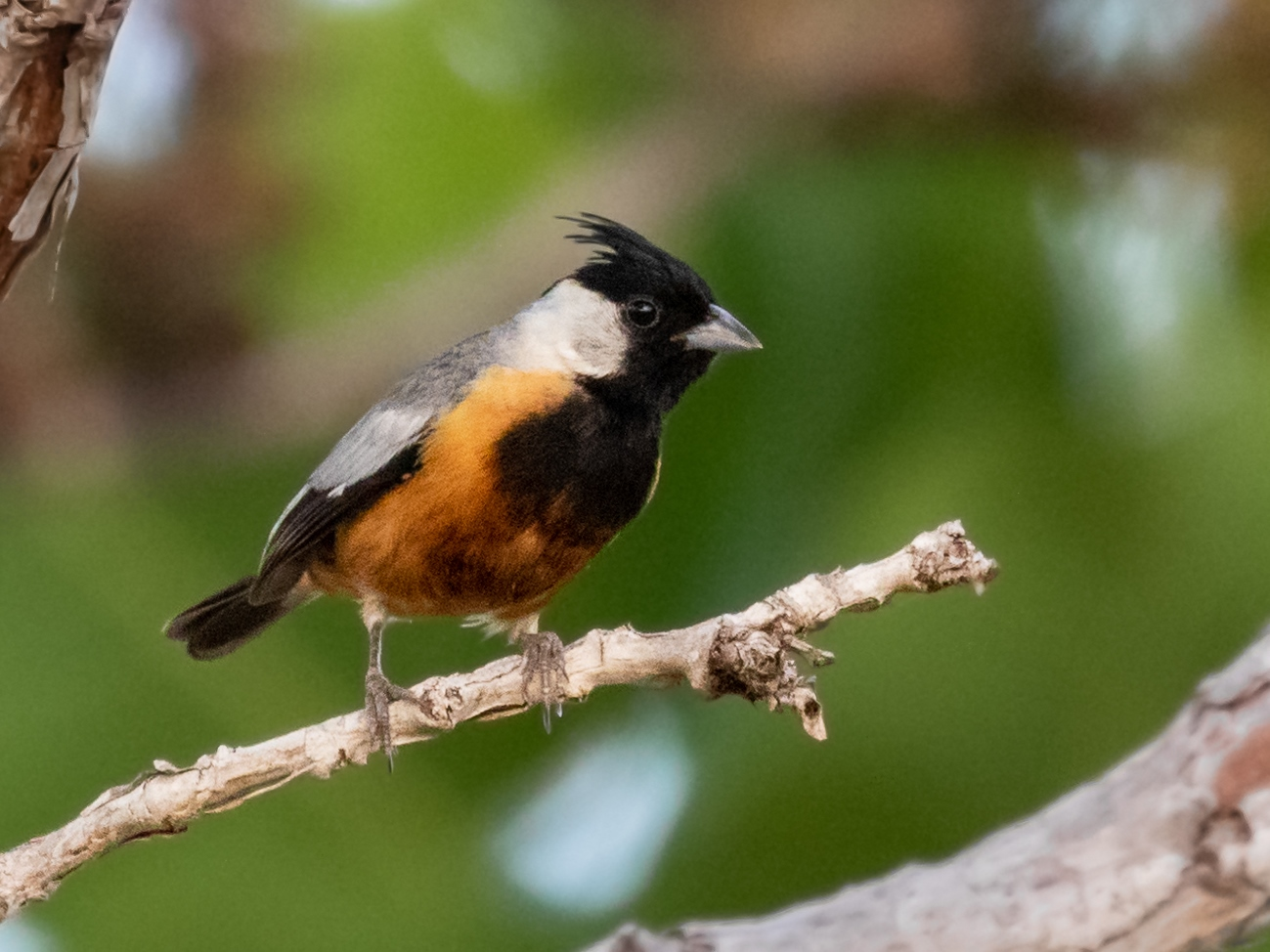
- male at Codó, Maranhão, Brazil

Conservation status
- Near Threatened (IUCN 3.1)

Scientific classification
- Kingdom: Animalia
- Phylum: Chordata
- Class: Aves
- Order: Passeriformes
- Family: Thraupidae
- Genus: Charitospiza; Oberholser, 1905
- Species: C. eucosma

Binomial name
- Charitospiza eucosma Oberholser, 1905

= Coal-crested finch =

Species of bird

The coal-crested finch (Charitospiza eucosma) is a species of bird in the family Thraupidae. Though previously classified in the bunting and American sparrow family Emberizidae, molecular phylogenetic studies have shown that it is a member of the large tanager family Thraupidae. It is the only member of the genus Charitospiza.

It is found mainly in the Cerrado, with small amounts in Bolivia and northern Argentina. Its natural habitat is dry savanna. It is threatened by habitat loss. It feeds on seed of plants specifically found in these habitats.

== Taxonomy ==
The coal-crested finch was formally described in 1905 by the American ornithologist Harry C. Oberholser. He introduced a new genus Charitospiza and coined the binomial name Charitospiza eucosma. The genus name combines the Ancient Greek kharis meaning "grace" or "beauty" and spiza meaning "finch". The specific epithet is from the Ancient Greek eukosmos meaning "decorous" or "well-adorned". The type locality is the state of Bahia in Brazil, near the border with Minas Gerais. The species is monotypic: no subspecies are recognised.

== Description ==
The coal-crested Finch is a rare and near-threatened bird species. Their generation length is 2.4 years, and their current population is decreasing. The species is characterized by its long spiky crest and its small size. It is a dichromatic species; both males and females have the diagnostic crest, but females are brown and males are black, white and gray. Juvenile coloration is the same as the female, but with a white belly and lower mandible. Their most common calls are soft.

== Measurements ==
The data is collected from the population of the Distrito Federal in central Brazil. The relatively small sample size of the variable "Body Mass" is due to the unavailability of a scale during parts of the data collection.

This species reaches an average body mass with the males being 10.79 ± 0.64g and the 10.93 ± 0.88g in females. The average body length for males is 11.19 ± 0.34g and females average around 11.30 ± 0.31g. The bill (culmen) in males is between 9.90 ± 0.44mm and is 9.98 ± 0.42mm for females. The tarsus in males is approximately 15.79 ± 0.82mm and for females is between 15.95 ± 0.64mm. The wing size (chord) averages to 57.11 ± 1.85mm in males and 55.67 ± 1.68mm in females. The tail (rectrices) averages between 43.38 ± 4.10mm for the males and 41.93 ± 3.05mm for the females. The crest averages between 20.52 ± 2.63mm for the males and between 19.59 ± 2.25mm for the females. The measurements for males and females are similar, with only minor variation across their features.

== Distribution and habitat ==
Coal-crested finches are distributed from Eastern Bolivia to Northeast and Central Brazil. They have also been found in Northern Argentina. Their elevation range is 200 to 1200 meters. They are residents, and there are no definite proven patterns of their migration. They are not migrants. Coal-crested finches prefer habitats with exposed ground.

== Behavior and diet ==
Coal-crested finches move in silent hops at varying speeds. Their skills are limited on the ground, and they cannot stay balanced on grass. When preening or resting, they hide in dense tree vegetation. They forage alone, in pairs, or in flocks. They capture their prey on the leaves and branches of trees. Coal-crested finches are omnivorous, and their diet varies depending on the season and reproductive activity. Their diet consists mainly of grass, fruits, and arthropods.

== Reproduction ==
Breeding takes place during the rainy season. Coal-crested finches partake in bimodal breeding, meaning they have two breeding seasons per year. The second breeding season depends on the success of the nests in the first season. Predation is the main cause of nest failure. The Coal-crested finch nest consists of spider webs and grass. The male and female birds work together to build these nests. The eggs, with blue, green, and brown coloring, are incubated by the female. There is a one-day interval between hatching. The parents feed the chicks with insects. After hatching, the chicks remain in the nests for about ten to thirteen days.

== Gallery ==
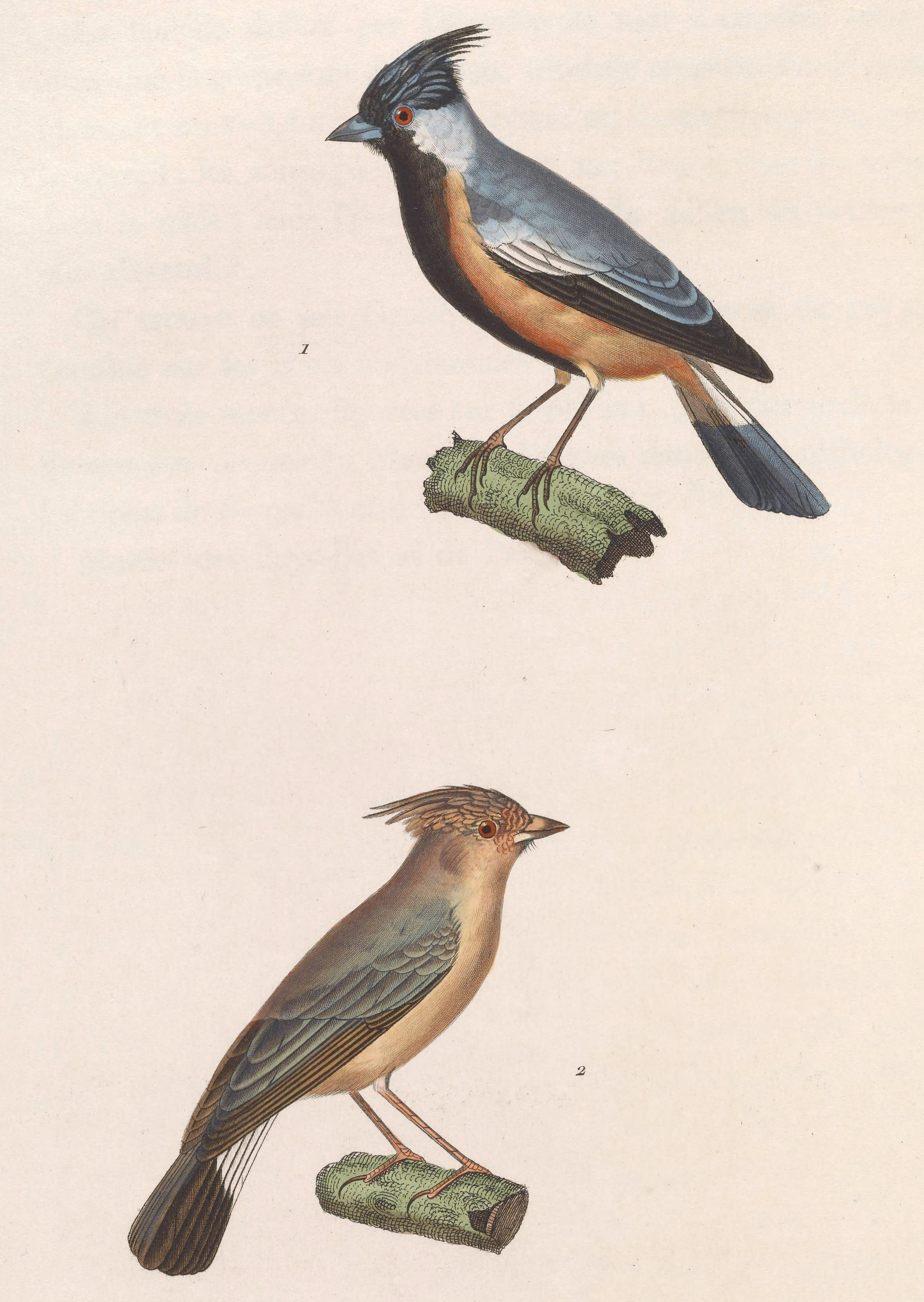
Charitospiza eucosma, 1838

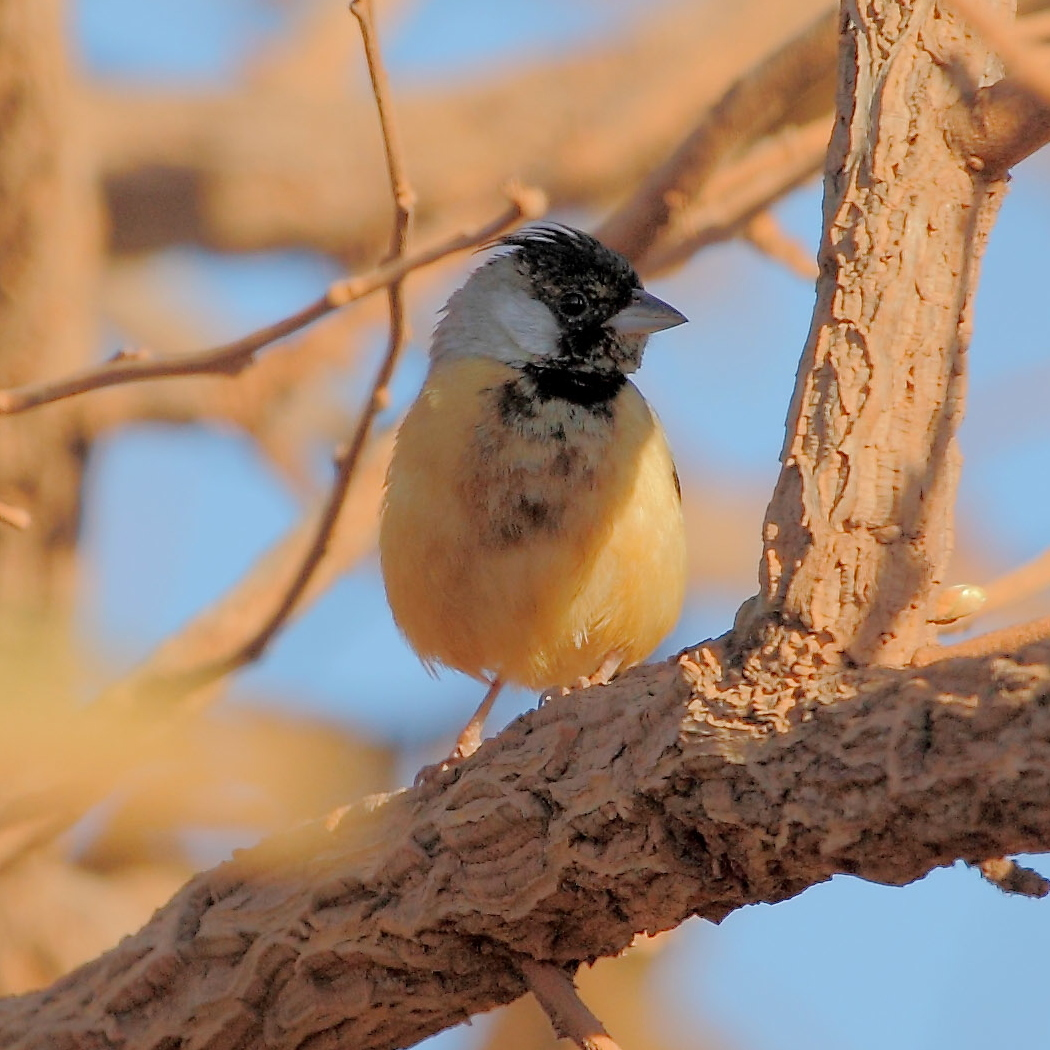
Coal-crested finch
