= Hemiergis millewae =

Conservation status
- Least Concern (IUCN 3.1)

Scientific classification
- Kingdom: Animalia
- Phylum: Chordata
- Class: Reptilia
- Order: Squamata
- Family: Scincidae
- Genus: Hemiergis
- Species: H. millewae

Binomial name
- Hemiergis millewae Coventry, 1976
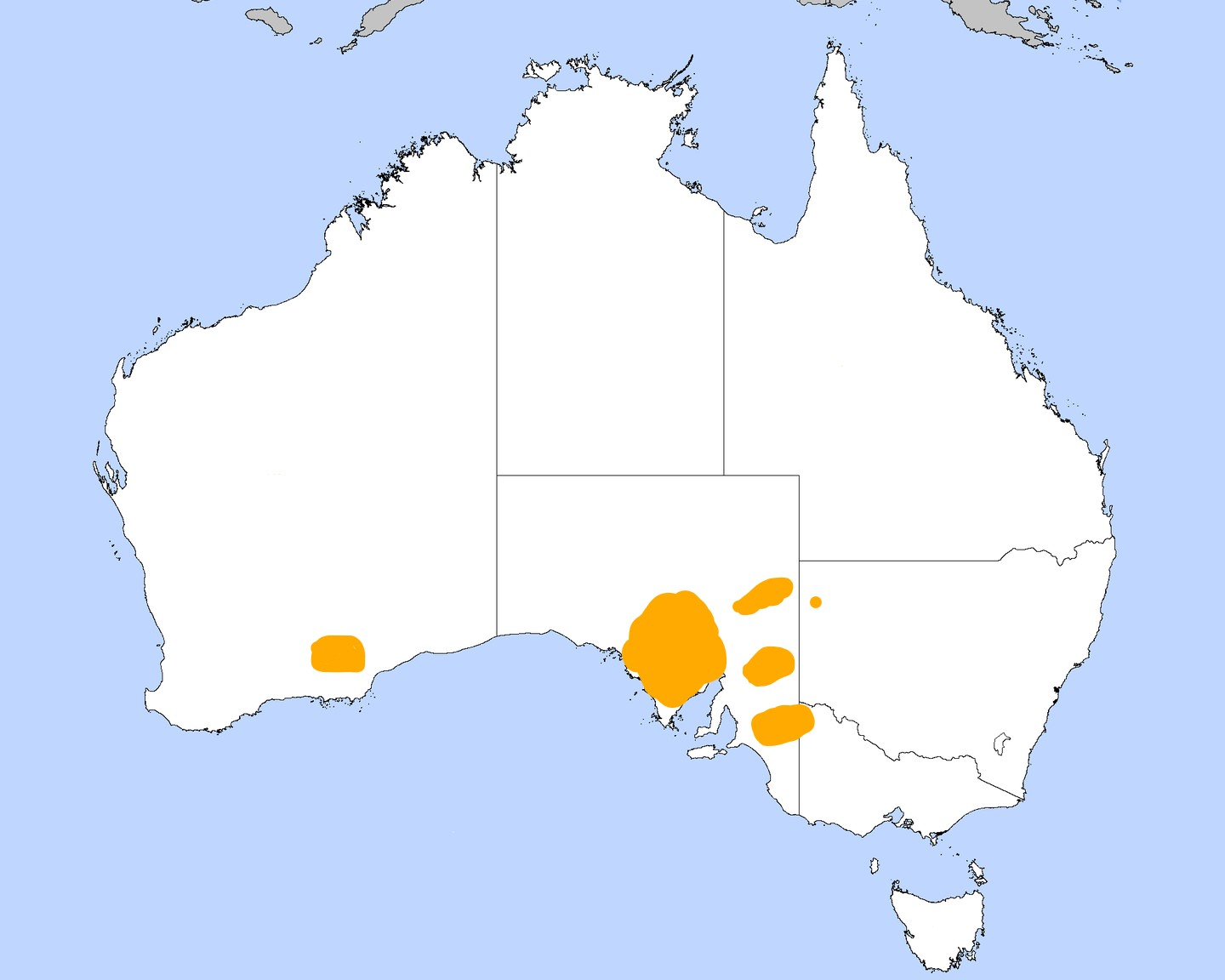
- The distribution of H. milliwae

Species of reptile

Hemiergis millewae, commonly known as the Millewa skink or Triodia earless skink, is a species of Hemiergis lizards that is endemic to Australia. It is a specialist species, highly dependent on spinifex (Triodia scariosa) for food and shelter, and has only been observed in semi-arid Mallee woodlands of southern and eastern Australia. It is considered endangered throughout parts of its range.

== Description ==
Hermiergis millewae is a small, terrestrial (ground-dwelling) skink which is native to Australia. It is characterised by dark brown shiny scales with a burnt orange stripe along its back, from above the ear to its hindlimbs, and pale grey underbelly. The Millewa skink has an elongated body, with four short limbs each containing five digits and a long tail similar in length to its torso. As with other Hemiergis (earless) skinks, its ears are not visible and it has an ear depression entirely covered by scales. It has a fifth supralabial scale contacting the eye.

Hermiergis millewae has a snout–vent length of 41–58 mm.

== Taxonomy ==
The Millewa skink (Hemiergis millewae) was first identified and described in 1976 by A.J. Coventry. It is one of seven species of earless skinks in the genus Hemiergis, all of which are endemic to Australia. Hemiergis millewae belongs to the family Scincidae which is one of the most diverse families of lizards characterized by their small limbs.

== Ecology and habitat ==
Hemiergis millewae is a thigmothermic skink, drawing heat from warm surfaces in its environment in order to regulate its body temperature.

The Millewa skink is one of several specialist species limited to Mallee eucalypt woodlands in Australia. They have been exclusively observed in areas with large hummocks of Triodia scariosa (spinifex), hence their other common name Triodia earless skink. They are heavily reliant on large clumps of spinifex with surrounding leaf litter which offers a suitable micro-climate and adequate food and protection without which it would be unlikely to survive.

=== Diet ===
The Millewa skink is insectivorous. It depends on the spinifex it inhabits for food, preying primarily on invertebrates which also inhabit hummocks such as ants and termites.

=== Reproduction ===
Hermiergis millewae are ovoviviparous, meaning the mother produces eggs which develop inside her and births live young. Female skinks generally birth one to two live young during late summer.

== Distribution ==
The Millewa skink has a fragmented distribution throughout the semi-arid Mallee eucalypt woodlands of southern Australia. There are isolated populations in the Coolgardi bioregion of southern Western Australia, in south-central (Eyre Peninsula and Flinders Ranges) and south-eastern South Australia, and in Victoria where they are limited to the Murray Sunset National Park. Isolated populations have also recently been discovered in the Barrier Range bioregion in north-western New South Wales.

== Conservation ==
Hemiergis millewae is considered a species of 'Least Concern' by the IUCN Red List due to its wide distribution across southern Australia. However, it has been listed as endangered in Victoria owing to its limited distribution and reliance on Triodia scariosa making it susceptible to threats such as land clearing and bushfire. In New South Wales, Triodia scariosa is also listed as a 'Critically Endangered Ecological Community' as it only covers 400ha in the Barrier Range where isolated populations of Millewa skink were recently found.

== Threats ==
=== Land clearing ===
Approximately 53 per cent of native vegetation has been cleared in the Mallee region to support agriculture, forestry, mining and urban development leading to fragmentation and degradation of Mallee woodlands. In addition, introduced and invasive species such as cattle and feral pigs trample spinifex as well as lizard burrows. This presents a key threat to the Millewa which relies exclusively on Mallee spinifex.

=== Bushfires ===
Fires can be beneficial as they promote new spinifex growth, however changes to the frequency and intensity of fires (particularly in southern Australia) alters the nature and distribution of vegetation which lizards depends on for food, shelter and reproduction. The Millewa skink particularly susceptible as it is heavily reliant on large mature spinifex hummocks and leaf litter. Spinifex dwellers typically decline immediately following fires and are most prevalent in areas that experienced fire 19–50 years ago, evidenced by the fact that H. Millewae has not been found in any recently burned areas.
