= Goodenia asteriscus =

Conservation status
- Priority Three — Poorly Known Taxa (DEC)

Scientific classification
- Kingdom: Plantae
- Clade: Tracheophytes
- Clade: Angiosperms
- Clade: Eudicots
- Clade: Asterids
- Order: Asterales
- Family: Goodeniaceae
- Genus: Goodenia
- Species: G. asteriscus

Binomial name
- Goodenia asteriscus P.J.Lang

Species of plant

Goodenia asteriscus is a species of flowering plant in the family Goodeniaceae and is endemic to central Australia. It is a herb with spatula-shaped to lance-shaped leaves at the base of the plant, and clusters of up to 19, mostly yellow flowers without bracteoles, and does not closely resemble any other species of Goodenia.

== Description ==
Goodenia anfracta is a stolon-forming herb with a dense rosette of leaves at the base of the plant, and that typically grows to a height of 8–22 cm (3.1–8.7 in). The leaves are spatula-shaped to lance-shaped or egg-shaped with the narrower end towards the base, mostly 25–65 mm (0.98–2.56 in) long including the petiole, and 5–18 mm (0.20–0.71 in) wide. Sometimes the leaves are toothed to pinnatifid, 10–35 mm (0.39–1.38 in) long with up to 8 lobes, each 1–9 mm (0.039–0.354 in) long and 1–3.5 mm (0.039–0.138 in) wide. The flowers are arranged in up to 19 flowering stems mostly 30–90 mm (1.2–3.5 in) long with up to 21 racemes each with 2 to 5 flowers lacking bracteoles. The sepals are lance-shaped to narrowly elliptic, 3.5–6 mm (0.14–0.24 in) long and the corolla is mostly yellow, 12.5–18 mm (0.49–0.71 in) long and hairy on the outside. The lower lobes of the corolla are 4.5–8 mm (0.18–0.31 in) long with wings 3.5–7.5 mm (0.14–0.30 in) wide. Flowering mainly occurs from September to January and the fruit is an elliptic capsule 7–10 mm (0.28–0.39 in) long and 5–7 mm (0.20–0.28 in) wide containing seeds with a wing 1.0–1.9 mm (0.039–0.075 in) wide.

== Taxonomy and naming ==
Goodenia asteriscus was first formally described in 2017 by Peter J. Lang in the journal Swainsona from specimens collected near Watarru in 2016. The specific epithet (asteriscus) means "little star", referring to the pattern of persistent flowering stems after the flowers have fallen.

== Distribution and habitat ==
This species of Goodenia grows in hard clay and loan soils in plant communities dominated by Triodia scariosa hummock grassland between the Cavenagh Range in Western Australia and Watarru in the north-west of South Australia.
