= Hemiergis gracilipes =

Conservation status
- Least Concern (IUCN 3.1)

Scientific classification
- Kingdom: Animalia
- Phylum: Chordata
- Class: Reptilia
- Order: Squamata
- Suborder: Scinciformata
- Infraorder: Scincomorpha
- Family: Sphenomorphidae
- Genus: Hemiergis
- Species: H. gracilipes

Binomial name
- Hemiergis gracilipes (Steindachner, 1870)

Species of lizard

The south-western mulch-skink (Hemiergis gracilipes) is a species of skink found in Western Australia.
