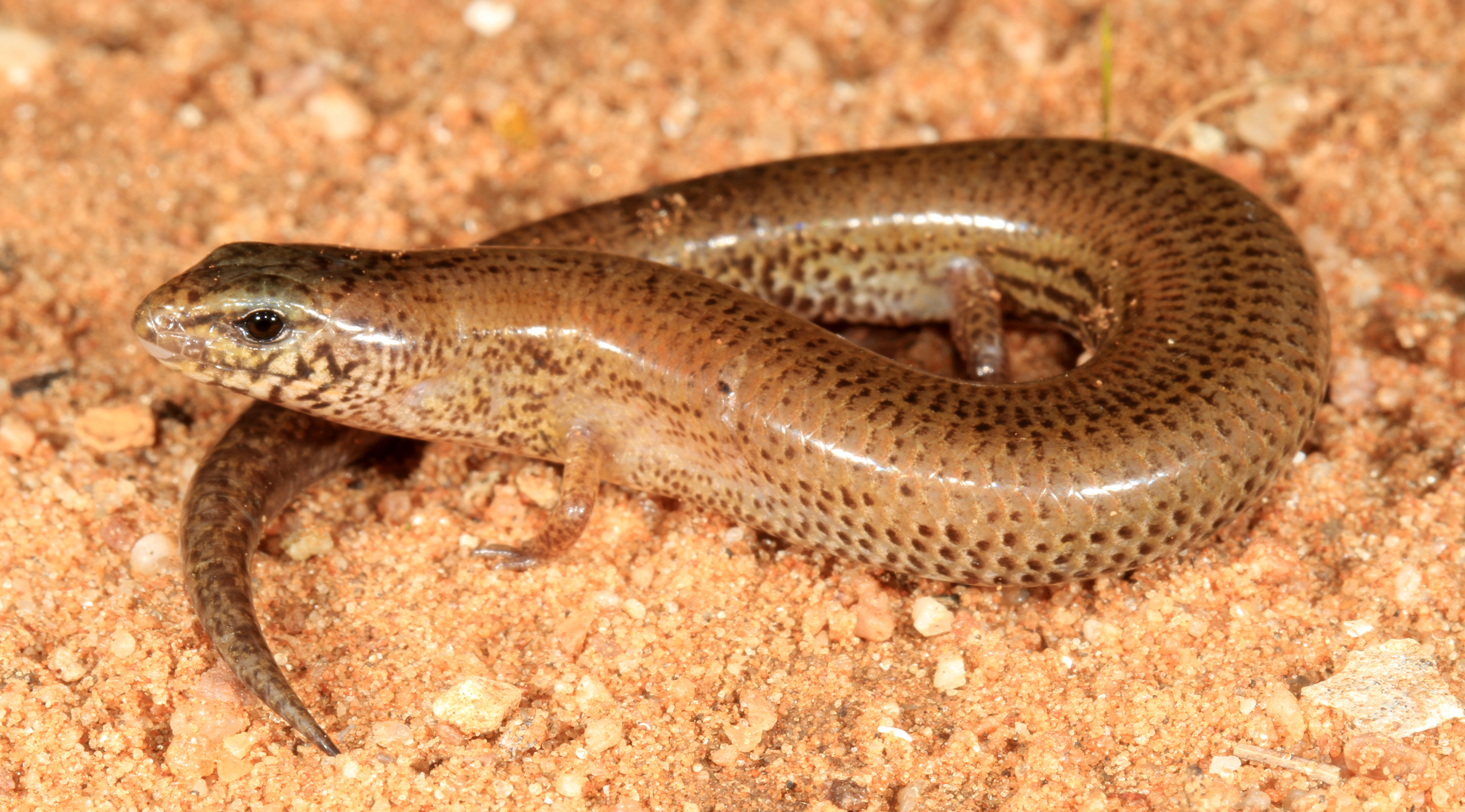
- Hemiergis peronii — Peron's earless skink or lowlands earless skink

Scientific classification
- Kingdom: Animalia
- Phylum: Chordata
- Class: Reptilia
- Order: Squamata
- Family: Scincidae
- Subfamily: Sphenomorphinae
- Genus: Hemiergis; Wagler, 1830

Type species
- Tridactylus decresiensis Cuvier, 1829

Species
- 7 species (see text)

= Earless skink =

Earless skinks

Genus of lizards

The earless skinks form the genus Hemiergis in the skink family Scincidae. All earless skinks are native to Australia. They are also called mulch skinks.

== Description ==
Hemiergis skinks are small, slender fossorial lizards with reduced limbs and varying numbers of digits. Depending on the species and population, individuals can have 2, 3, 4 or 5 fingers/toes.

Ventral surfaces are typically yellow to reddish orange. Snout-vent lengths range from 42 mm to 89 mm [cite Wilson and Swan]. Dorsal surfaces are typically brown and may have dark brown or black paravertebral or dorsolateral stripes.

Variation in digit number between species and populations of Hemiergis has been used to better understand the influence of the Sonic hedgehog (Shh) gene on embryonic development. For example, one study found a clear correlation between adult digit number and duration of the SHH protein expression early in limb development, with reduced expression of the SHH protein correlated with fewer digits.

Hemiergis means 'half worker', in reference to the short limbs that are characteristic of the genus.

Hemiergis is closely related to the other Australian skink genera Anomalopus and Eremiascincus..

== Distribution ==
Hemiergis is an Australian genus, found across the southern end of the continent, with populations in the states of New South Wales, Victoria, South Australia, and Western Australia.

== Reproduction ==
Hemiergis are ovoviviparous, meaning the mother produces eggs which develop inside her and she gives birth to live young. This is common in southern Australian (cold climate) reptiles. Clutch sizes range from 1 to 6.

== Ecology and habitat ==
Hemiergis individuals are typically found dwelling in loose damp soil under logs, rocks and leaf litter.

Their diet consists of small invertebrates.

== Species ==
There are seven species:

- Hemiergis decresiensis (Cuvier, 1829) — three-toed earless skink
- Hemiergis gracilipes (Steindachner, 1870) — south-western mulch-skink
- Hemiergis initialis (Werner, 1910) — southwestern earless skink
- Hemiergis millewae Coventry, 1976 — Triodia earless skink
- Hemiergis peronii (Gray, 1831) — four-toed earless skink, Peron's earless skink, or lowlands earless skink
- Hemiergis quadrilineatus (Duméril & Bibron, 1839) — two-toed earless skink
- Hemiergis talbingoensis (Copland, 1946) — eastern three-toed earless skink

Two additional species, H. graciloides and H. maccoyi, have been included in this genus but both are now classified in other genera.
