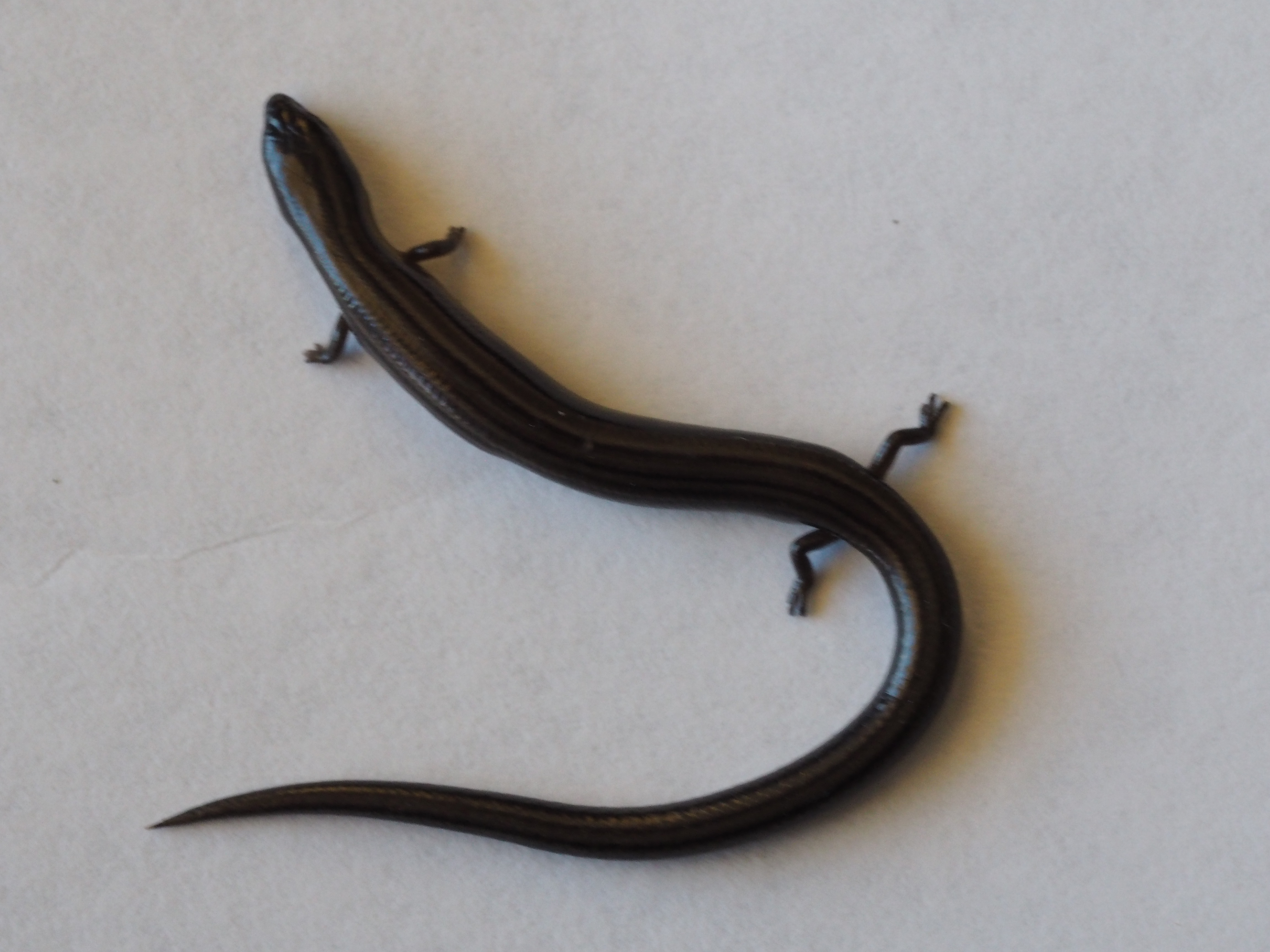

Conservation status
- Least Concern (IUCN 3.1)

Scientific classification
- Kingdom: Animalia
- Phylum: Chordata
- Class: Reptilia
- Order: Squamata
- Suborder: Scinciformata
- Infraorder: Scincomorpha
- Family: Sphenomorphidae
- Genus: Hemiergis
- Species: H. decresiensis

Binomial name
- Hemiergis decresiensis (Cuvier, 1829)
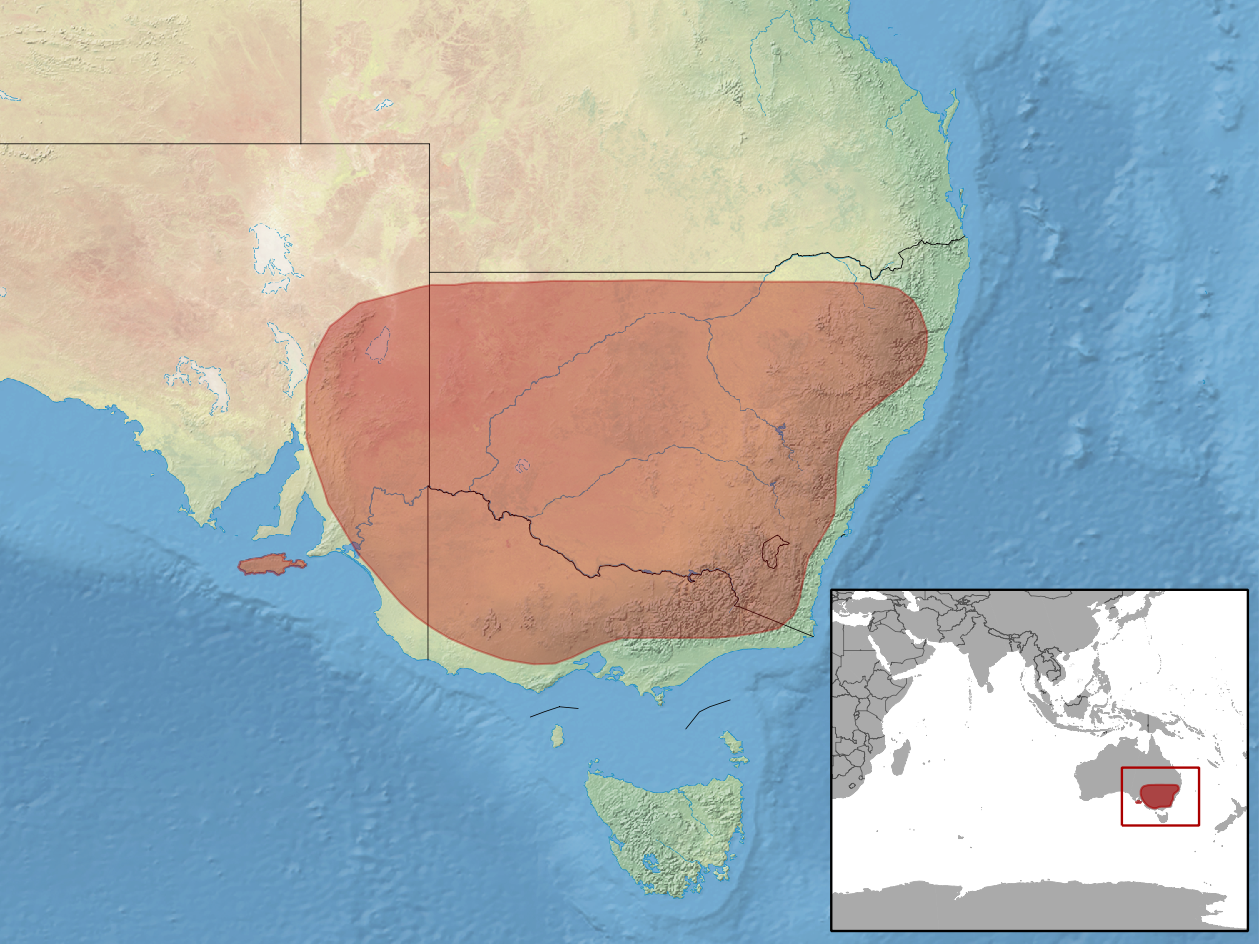

= Three-toed earless skink =

Species of reptile

The three-toed earless skink (Hemiergis decresiensis) is a viviparous earless skink from southeastern Australia.

== Description ==
Hemiergis decresiensis is a thin, smooth-scaled lizard with short legs, a movable, transparent lower eyelid and no visible ear opening. It is a burrowing species with only three small toes on each limb.

The upper surface is a rich brown colour with a few dark brown stripes or spots. Its sides are greyish brown with darker spots and there is a narrow dark brown line along the side of the head and through the eye.

It lays several oval-shaped eggs that hatch only a few days later.
