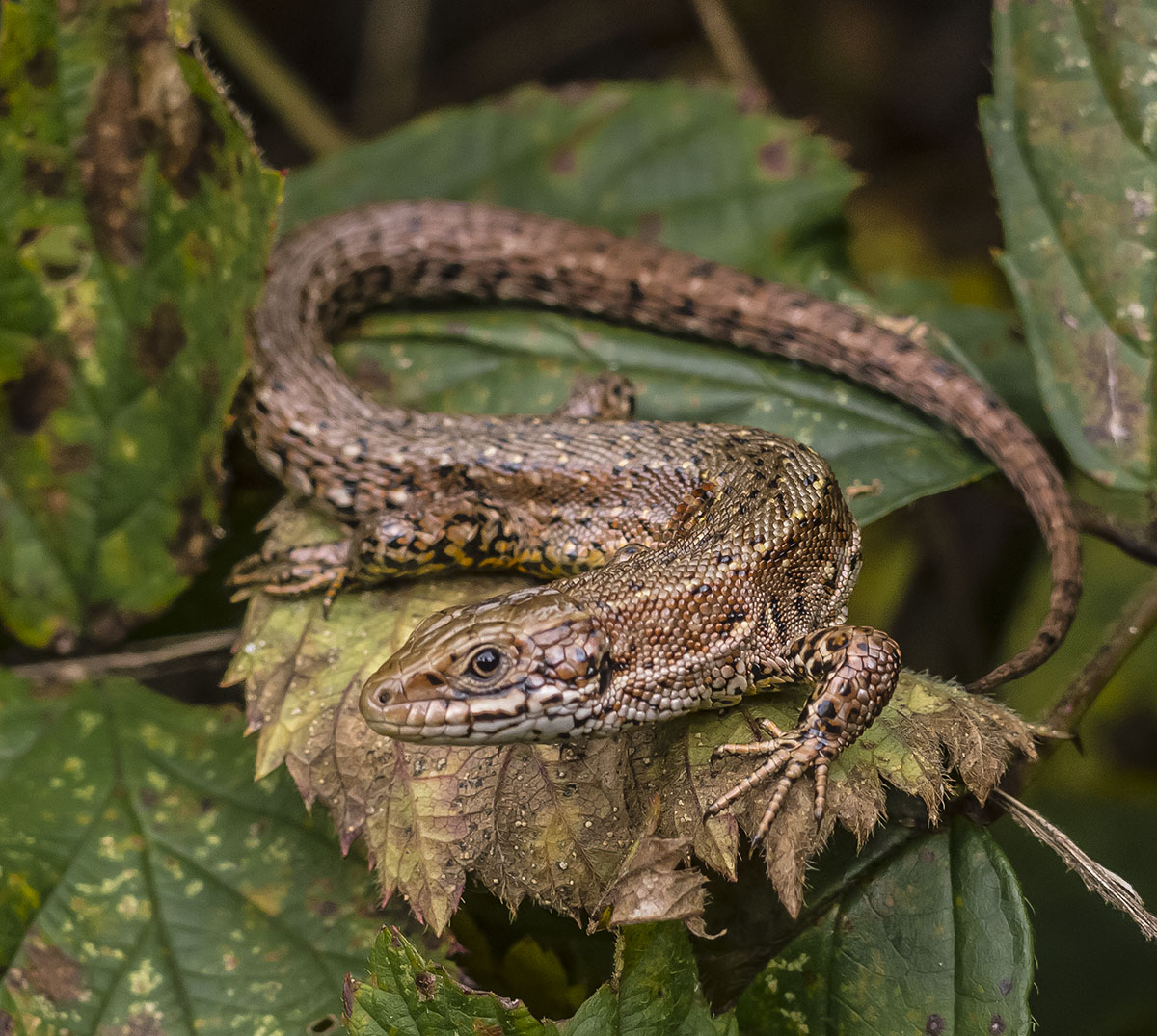

Conservation status
- Least Concern (IUCN 3.1)

Scientific classification
- Kingdom: Animalia
- Phylum: Chordata
- Class: Reptilia
- Order: Squamata
- Family: Lacertidae
- Genus: Zootoca
- Species: Z. vivipara

Binomial name
- Zootoca vivipara (Lichtenstein, 1823)
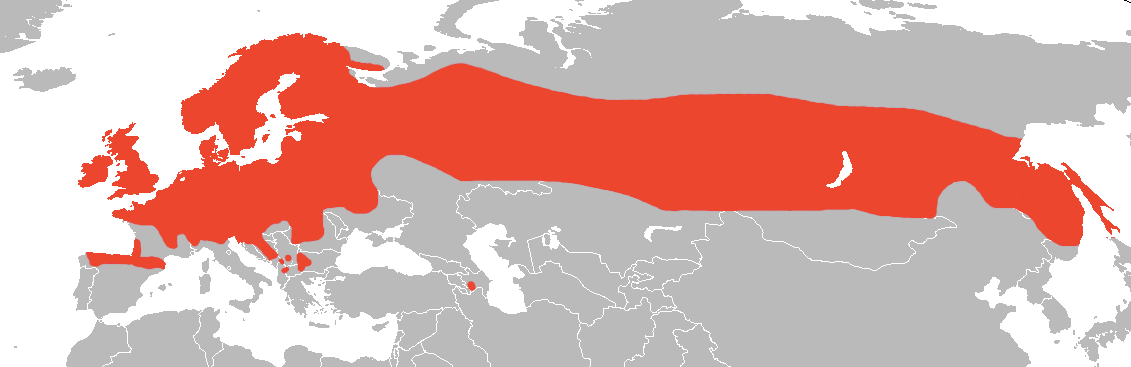
- The viviparous lizard is found across Northern Europe through Central Asia, ranging further north than any other land-dwelling reptile.

Synonyms
- Lacerta vivipara Lichtenstein, 1823

= Viviparous lizard =

Species of lizard

The viviparous lizard or common lizard (Zootoca vivipara) is a Eurasian lizard. It lives farther north than any other non-marine, non-avian reptile species, and is named for the fact that it is viviparous, meaning it gives birth to live young (although they will sometimes lay eggs normally). Both "Zootoca" and "vivipara" mean "live birth", in (Latinized) Greek and Latin respectively. It was called Lacerta vivipara until the genus Lacerta was split into nine genera in 2007 by Arnold, Arribas & Carranza.

Zootoca vivipara lives in very cold climates, yet participates in normal thermoregulation instead of thermoconformity. They have the largest range of all terrestrial lizards which even include subarctic regions. It is able to survive these harsh climates as individuals will freeze in especially cold seasons and thaw two months later. They also live closer to geological phenomena that provide a warmer environment for them.

== Description ==
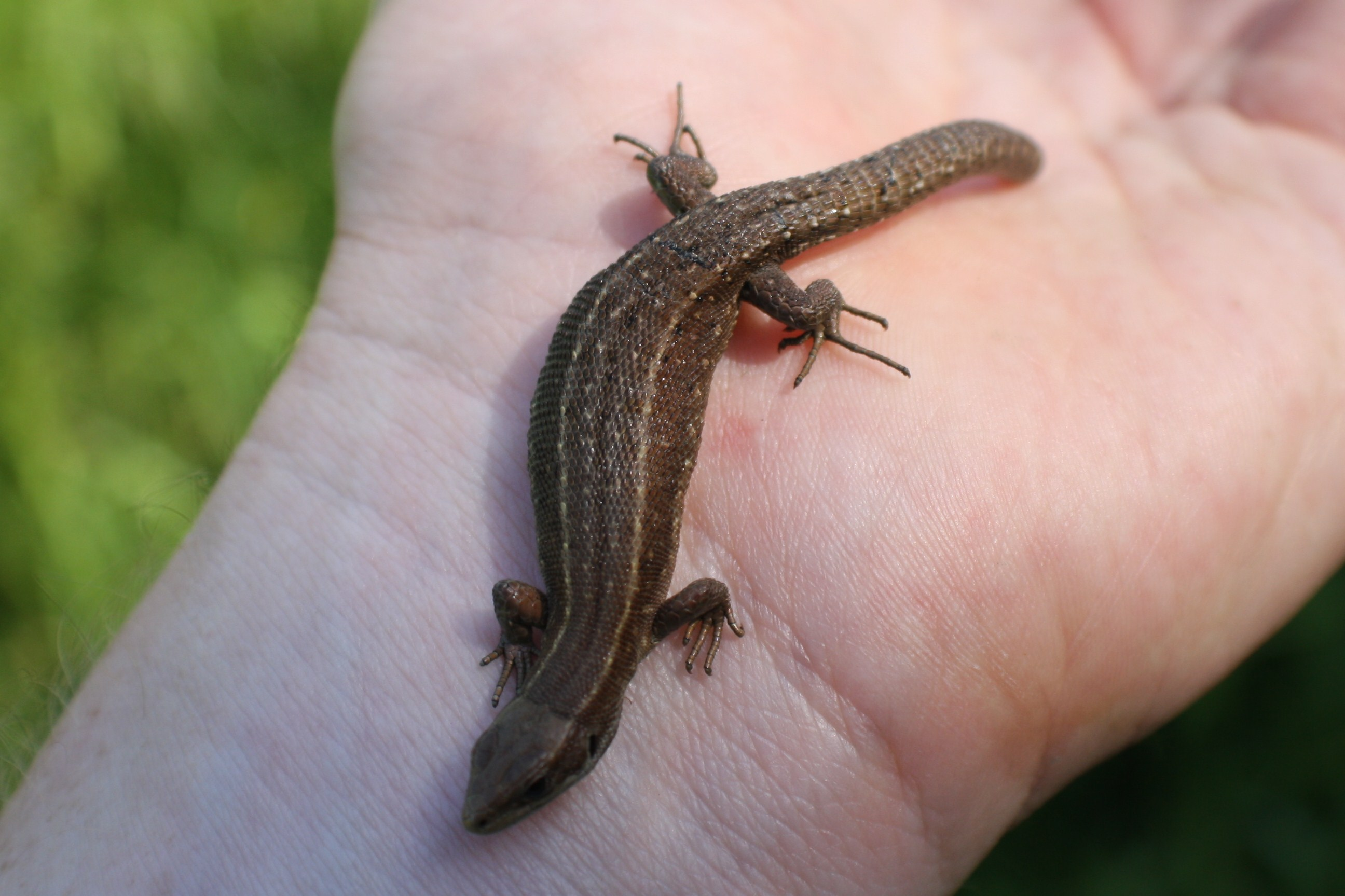
Size compared with a hand

Zootoca vivipara is a small lizard, with an average length between 50 and 77 mm (2–3 in) and an average mass of 2 to 5 g (0.1–0.2 oz). They exhibit no particular colour, but can be brown, red, grey, green, or black. The species exhibits some sexual dimorphisms. Female Z. vivipara undergo colour polymorphism more commonly than males. A female lizard's display differs in ventral coloration, ranging from pale yellow to bright orange and a mixed coloration. There have been many hypotheses for the genetic cause of this polymorphic coloration. These hypotheses test for coloration due to thermoregulation, predator avoidance, and social cues, specifically sexual reproduction. Through an experiment conducted by Vercken et al., colour polymorphism in viviparous lizard is caused by social cues, rather than the other hypotheses. More specifically, the ventral coloration that is seen in female lizards is associated with patterns of sexual reproduction and sex allocation.

The underside of the male is typically more colourful and bright, with yellow, orange, green, and blue, and the male typically has spots along its back. On the other hand, females typically have darker stripes down their backs and sides. Additionally, males have been found to have larger heads than their female counterparts, and this trait appears to be sexually selected for. Males with larger heads are more likely to be successful in mating and male-male interactions than smaller-headed Z. vivipara. Larger males also have been shown to reproduce more frequently during one mating season compared to smaller males. Characteristic behaviors of the species include tongue flicking in the presence of a predator and female-female aggression that seems to be mediated by the colour of their side stripe.

== Habitat and distribution ==
=== Habitat ===
Z. vivipara is terrestrial, so they spend most of their time on the ground, though they do occasionally visit sites of higher elevation. The lizard thermoregulates by basking in the sun for much of the time. In colder weather, they have been known to hibernate to maintain proper body temperatures. They hibernate between October and March. Their typical habitats include heathland, moorland, woodland and grassland.

The viviparous lizard is native to much of northern Eurasia. In Europe, it is mainly found north of the Alps and the Carpathians, including the British Isles but not Iceland, as well as in parts of northern Iberia and the Balkans; In Asia it is mostly found in Russia, excluding northern Siberia, and in northern Kazakhstan, Mongolia, China, and Japan. Z. vivipara has the largest distribution of any species of lizard in the world.

The viviparous lizard holds the distinction of being Ireland's only native terrestrial reptile.

== Home range ==
The size of the home range of the lizard ranges from 539 m^{2} to 1692 m^{2}, with males generally having larger home ranges. The size of an individual lizard's home range is also dependent on population density and the presence of prey.

== Ecology ==
=== Diet ===
Unlike many other lizards, Z. vivipara is exclusively insectivorous. Their diet consists of flies, spiders, and various other insects, including hemipterans (such as cicadas), moth larvae, and mealworms. The species is a predator, so it actively hunts down all of its prey. One study found that when controlled for body size, females consumed more food than males. Feeding rates also increased with increased sunshine.

=== Predation ===
Birds are common predators of Z. vivipara. Male-biased predation of Z. vivipara by the great grey shrike (L. excubitor) has been studied, finding that adult males, over adult females and juveniles, were preferentially preyed upon. This bias may be due to increased activity of adult males during the reproductive season.

Predators of this species include birds of prey, crows, snakes, shrikes, hedgehogs, shrews, foxes, and domestic cats.

=== Diseases and parasites ===
Z. vivpara can be infested by helminths, a small parasitic worm. The species diversity of parasites is affected by the diet of the individual lizard and the number of parasites on a host is affected by the host's size. Results of a study shows that the more carnivorous an individual is, the less diverse its parasite population. Additionally, larger lizards had a greater number of parasites on them.

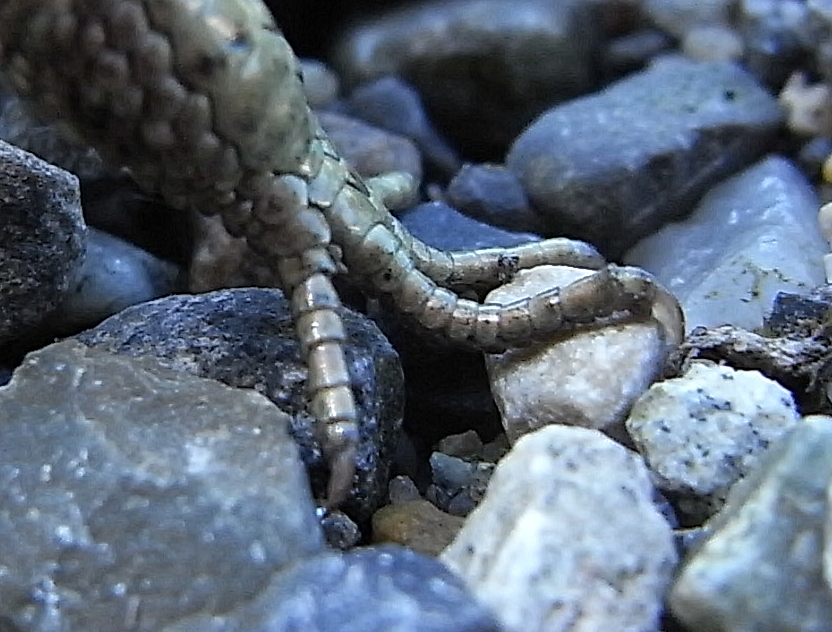
Front foot

Z. vivipara is also infected by blood parasites. In a study investigating the prevalence of blood parasites in Z. vivipara and L. agilis, Z. vivipara was found to be parasitized with an incidence rate of 39.8%, while L. agilis was parasitized with an incidence rate of 22.3%. This same study shows that there was not a significant difference between the parasitization of male and female Z. vivipara.

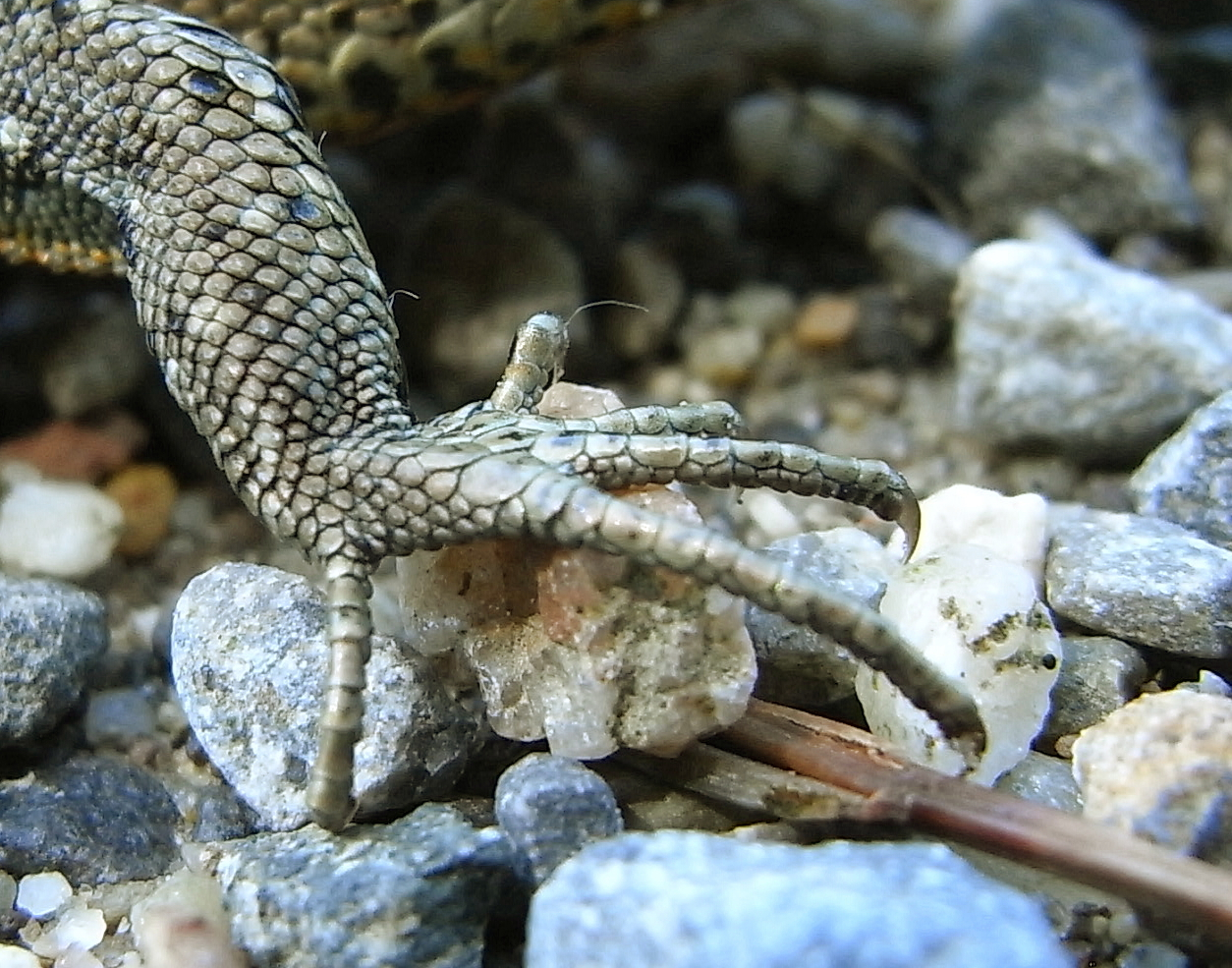
Hind foot

== Reproduction and life history ==
=== Viviparity and oviparity ===
The viviparous lizard is named as such because it is viviparous. This refers to its ability to give birth to live young, although the lizards are also able to lay eggs. The origin of this characteristic is under debate. Some scientists argue that viviparity evolved from oviparity, or the laying of eggs, only once. Proponents of this theory also argue that if this is the case, it is possible, though rare, for species to transition back to oviparity. Research from Yann Surget-Groba suggests that there have in fact been multiple events of the evolution of viviparity from oviparity across different clades of the viviparous lizard. They also argue that a reversion to oviparity is not as rare as once believed, but has occurred 2 to 3 times in the history of the species.

The range of viviparous populations of Z. vivipara extends from France to Russia. Oviparous populations are only found in northern Spain and the southwest of France. Some research in the Italian alps has suggested that distinct populations of oviparous and viviparous Z. vivipara should be considered separate species. Cornetti et al. (2015) identified that viviparous and oviparous subpopulations in contact with each other in the Italian alps are reproductively isolated. Hybridization between viviparous and oviparous individuals of Z. vivipara leads to embryonic malformations in the laboratory. However, these crosses do produce a "hybridized" generation of offspring, with females retaining embryos for much longer in utero than oviparous females, with embryos surrounded by thin, translucent shells.

=== Fertilization ===
Z. vivipara juveniles reach sexual maturity during their second year of their life. A study that explored the presence of male sex cells in reproducing males found that for the two weeks following the end of hibernation, males are infertile, and therefore incapable of reproducing. The same study also found that larger males produce more sperm during the reproductive season and have fewer left over at the end of the reproductive season than their smaller counterparts. This suggests that the larger a male is, the more reproductive events they participate in.

=== Brood size ===
Research also suggests that in exclusively oviparous populations of Z. vivipara, altitude influences the number of clutches laid in a reproductive season as well as when reproduction begins. Generally, lizards living at higher altitudes have been found to begin reproduction later and lay fewer clutches (often 1) in a given reproductive season.

=== Life span ===
Z. vivipara typically lives for 5 to 6 years.

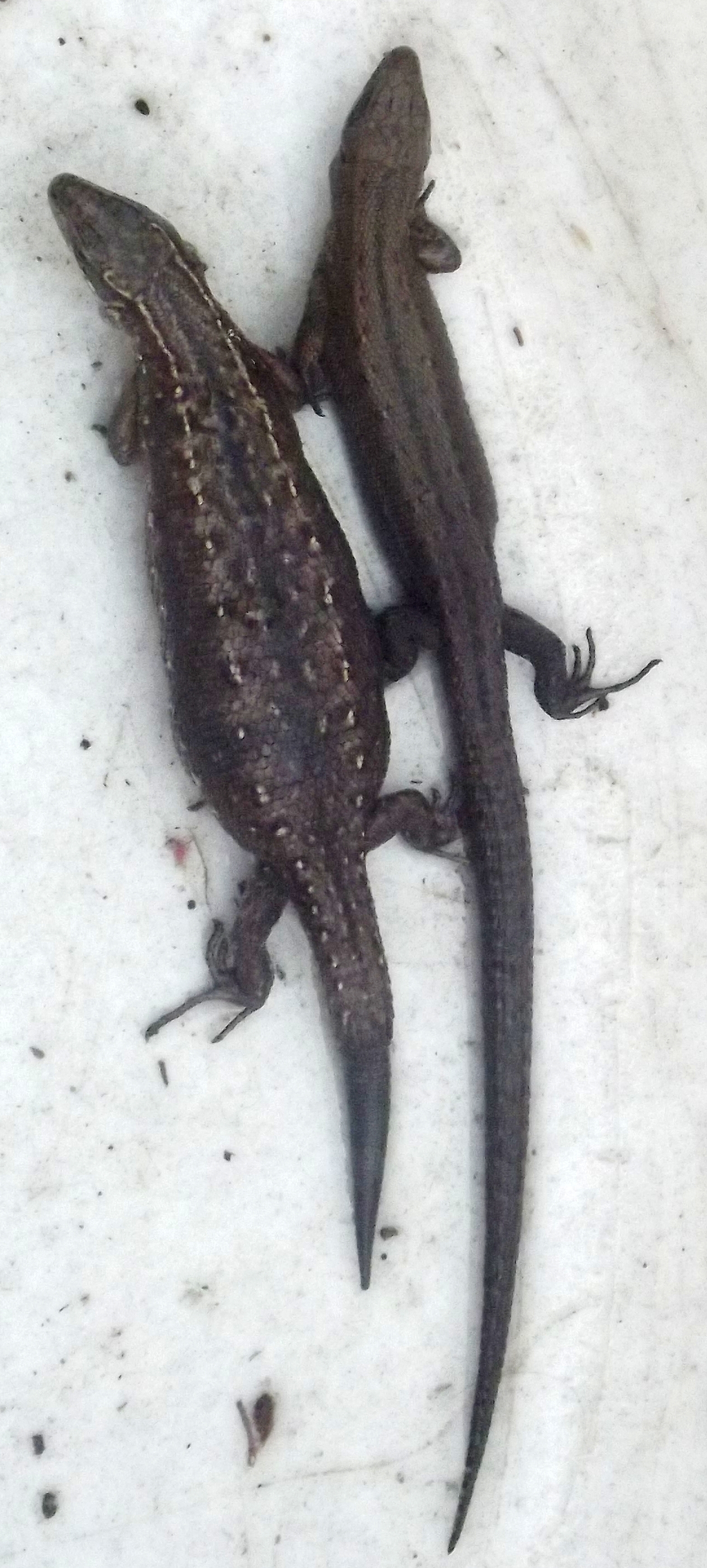
Female (left) and male (right). Note the tail of the female after autotomy

== Mating ==
=== Mate searching behavior ===
Head size is a sexually dimorphic trait, with males having larger heads than females. The average head width and length of the males measured were found to be 5.6 and 10.5 mm (0.22 and 0.41 in), respectively. The average head width and length of the females measured were found to be 5.3 and 9.7 mm (0.21 and 0.38 in), respectively. During the first state of courtship in Z. vivipara, called "Capture", the male uses its mouth and jaw to capture the female and initiate copulation. The results of this study demonstrated that males with larger head sizes (both length and width) were more successful in mating than those with smaller heads, suggesting that head size undergoes sexual selection.

=== Male-male interaction ===
Head size has also been shown to be a predictor of success in male-male interactions. The head is used as a weapon in male-male interactions, and a larger head is typically more effective, leading to greater success during male-male aggressive encounters. This aggression and interaction is centered around available mates, so males with smaller heads have significantly less access to females for reproduction.

== Thermoregulation ==
This lizard has an exceptionally large range that includes subarctic geography. As a result, thermoregulation is necessary for the thermal homeostasis of the species. Typically, in temperature extremes, a species will adopt the behavioral strategy of thermoconformity, where they do not actively thermoregulate, but adapt to survive in the harsh temperature. This occurs because the cost of thermoregulating in such an extreme environment becomes too high and begins to outweigh the benefits. Despite this, Z. vivipara still employs the strategy of thermoregulation, like basking. Thermoregulation is important in Z. vivipara as it allows for proper locomotive performance, escape behavior, and other key behaviors for survival. The ability of Z. vivipara to thermoregulate in such harsh environments has been attributed to two primary reasons. The first is that Z. vivipara has remarkable behaviors to combat the cold, and there are geological phenomena in their distribution that maintains their habitats at a temperature that the species can survive in. One of the specific behaviors used to combat the extreme cold is a "supercooled" state. Z. vivipara remains in this state through the winter until temperatures dropped below −3 °C (27 °F). After that, individuals completely froze until they were thawed by warmer weather later in the year, often 2 months later. Despite very cold air in the subarctic habitats of these lizards, the soil-heating effects of unfrozen groundwater has been observed regulating the temperature of their soil habitats. They find warm microhabitats that do not drop below the freezing point of their body fluids. These lizards have exceptional hardiness to the cold, which allows them to hibernate in upper soil layers in temperatures as low as −10 °C (14 °F). This cold hardiness along with the favorable hydrogeological conditions of groundwater-warmed soil habitats allows for the wide distribution of lizards throughout the palearctic.

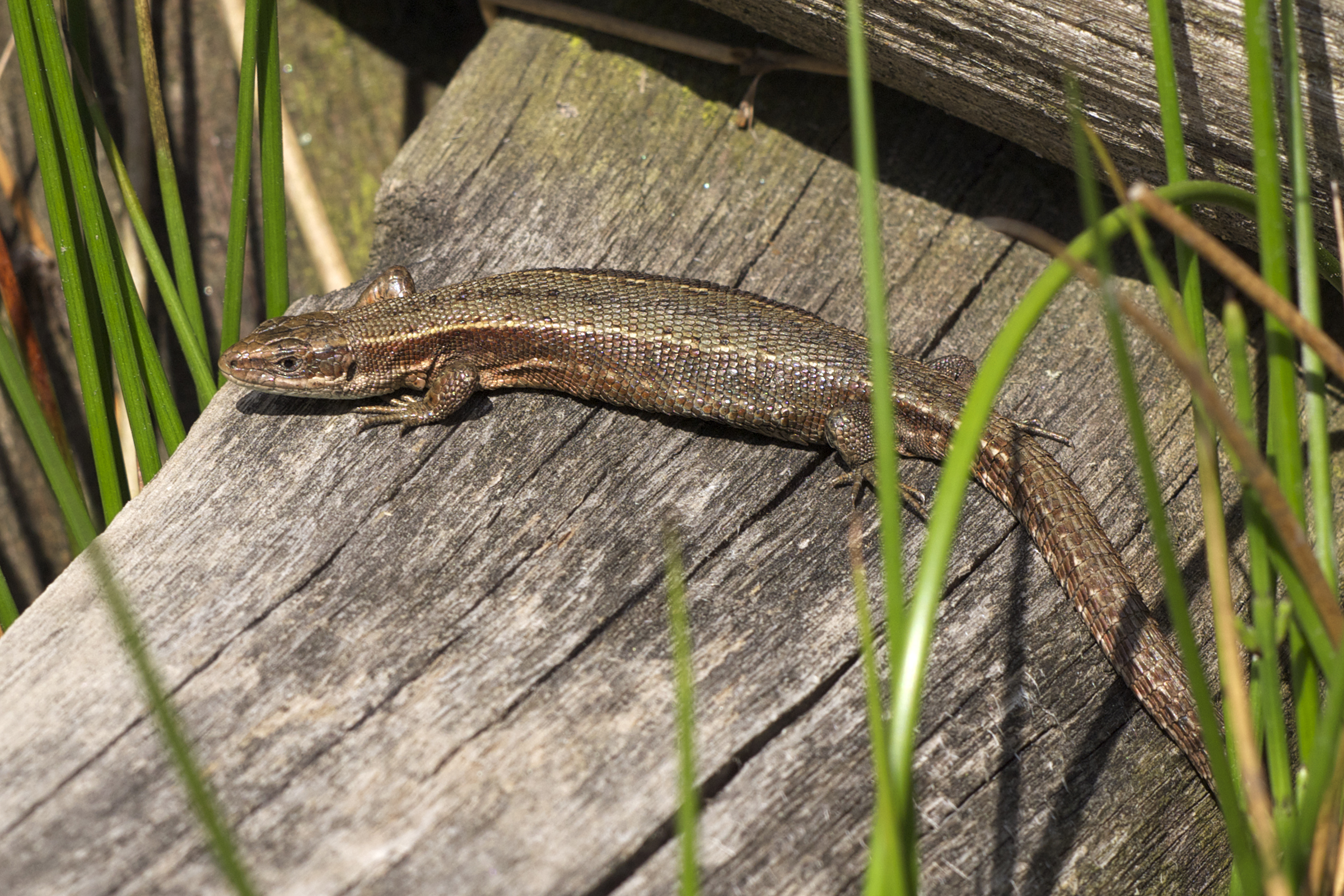
Female

== Colour polymorphism ==
On logs in Estonia

The colour polymorphism of female Z. vivipara has not been thoroughly studied in past years, regardless of the extensive research done on the species itself. Females exhibit three types of body colouration within a population: yellow, orange, and mixture of the two. These discrete traits are inherited maternally and exist throughout the individual's lifetime. The organism's colour morphs are determined by their genotype as well as their environment.

The frequency of multiple morphs occurring in a population varies with the level of population density and frequency-dependent environments. These factors cause the lizards to vary in terms of their fitness (clutch size, sex ratio, hatching success). In lower density populations, colour polymorphism is more prevalent. This is because viviparous lizards thrive in environments where intraspecific competition is low. Increased competition among individuals results in lower survival rates of lizards. Additionally, female lizards disperse through habitats based on the frequency of colour types that are already present in the population. Their reproductive abilities vary according to this frequency-dependent environment. The number of offspring that they produce correlates with the colour morph: yellow females produce the fewest offspring, while orange females produce more than yellow, but fewer than mixed females, which produce the most offspring. The amount of offspring produced varies in regards to colour frequencies in the population; for example, if yellow females have higher density within the population, the clutch size for orange lizards is usually lower.

Orange females are more sensitive to intraspecific and colour-specific competition. They have smaller clutch sizes when the density of the population is high, or when the number of yellow females in the population is high. This could be due to their need to conserve energy for survival and reproductive events. Their colour morph remains in the population due to the trade-off between the size of offspring and the clutch size. Offspring born in smaller clutches are often larger and thus have a higher survival likelihood. Natural selection will favor individuals with larger size because of their advantage in physical competition with others. Yellow females have larger clutch sizes early in their life, but their hatch success decreases as the female ages. Their reproductive viability decreases, resulting in fewer offspring throughout their lifetime. Yellow morphs remain in the population due to their large clutch size, which causes an increased frequency of those females. Selection favors the yellow morph because of the ability to produce large clutch sizes, which increases the female's fitness. In mixed-coloured females, reproductive success is less sensitive to competition and frequency-dependent environments. Since these lizards show a mixture of yellow and orange colouration, they adopt benefits from both of the morphs. As a result, they can maintain high reproductive success and hatching success with large clutch sizes. Their colour morph remains in the population due to its high fitness, which selection will favor.

All three colours have evolutionary advantages in different ways. While yellow females have higher fitness due to their large clutch sizes, orange females enjoy high fitness due to their large body size and increased competitive advantages. Mixed females exhibit both of these advantages.

== See also ==
- Bimodal reproduction
