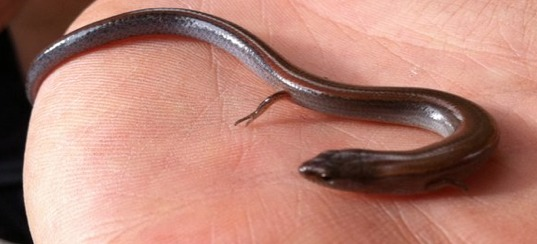

Conservation status
- Least Concern (IUCN 3.1)

Scientific classification
- Kingdom: Animalia
- Phylum: Chordata
- Class: Reptilia
- Order: Squamata
- Family: Scincidae
- Genus: Hemiergis
- Species: H. quadrilineatus

Binomial name
- Hemiergis quadrilineatus (Duméril and Bibron, 1839)

Synonyms
- Chelomeles quadrilineatus Duméril and Bibron, 1839; Lygosoma quadrilineatum (Duméril and Bibron, 1839); Hemiergis quadrilineatum (Duméril and Bibron, 1839)

= Two-toed earless skink =

Species of lizard

The two-toed earless skink (Hemiergis quadrilineatus) is a common species of skink found in coastal south-western, Western Australia. It is characterized by its long tail, an absence of ear-holes, shiny skin, yellow underside, and short weak limbs, each of which with only two toes. It can grow to be over 10 cm in length, however the average size is approximately 7.5 cm. It also exhibits a snake-like movement, and due to the small size and non-functionality of limbs in locomotion, it is often referred to as a legless lizard.

It typically inhabits bushland and scrub, however it is commonly found in Perth suburban backyards amongst leaves or under rocks.
