= Hemiergis initialis =

Conservation status
- Least Concern (IUCN 3.1)

Scientific classification
- Kingdom: Animalia
- Phylum: Chordata
- Class: Reptilia
- Order: Squamata
- Suborder: Scinciformata
- Infraorder: Scincomorpha
- Family: Sphenomorphidae
- Genus: Hemiergis
- Species: H. initialis

Binomial name
- Hemiergis initialis (Werner, 1910)

Species of lizard

The southwestern earless skink (Hemiergis initialis) is a species of skink found in South Australia and Western Australia.
