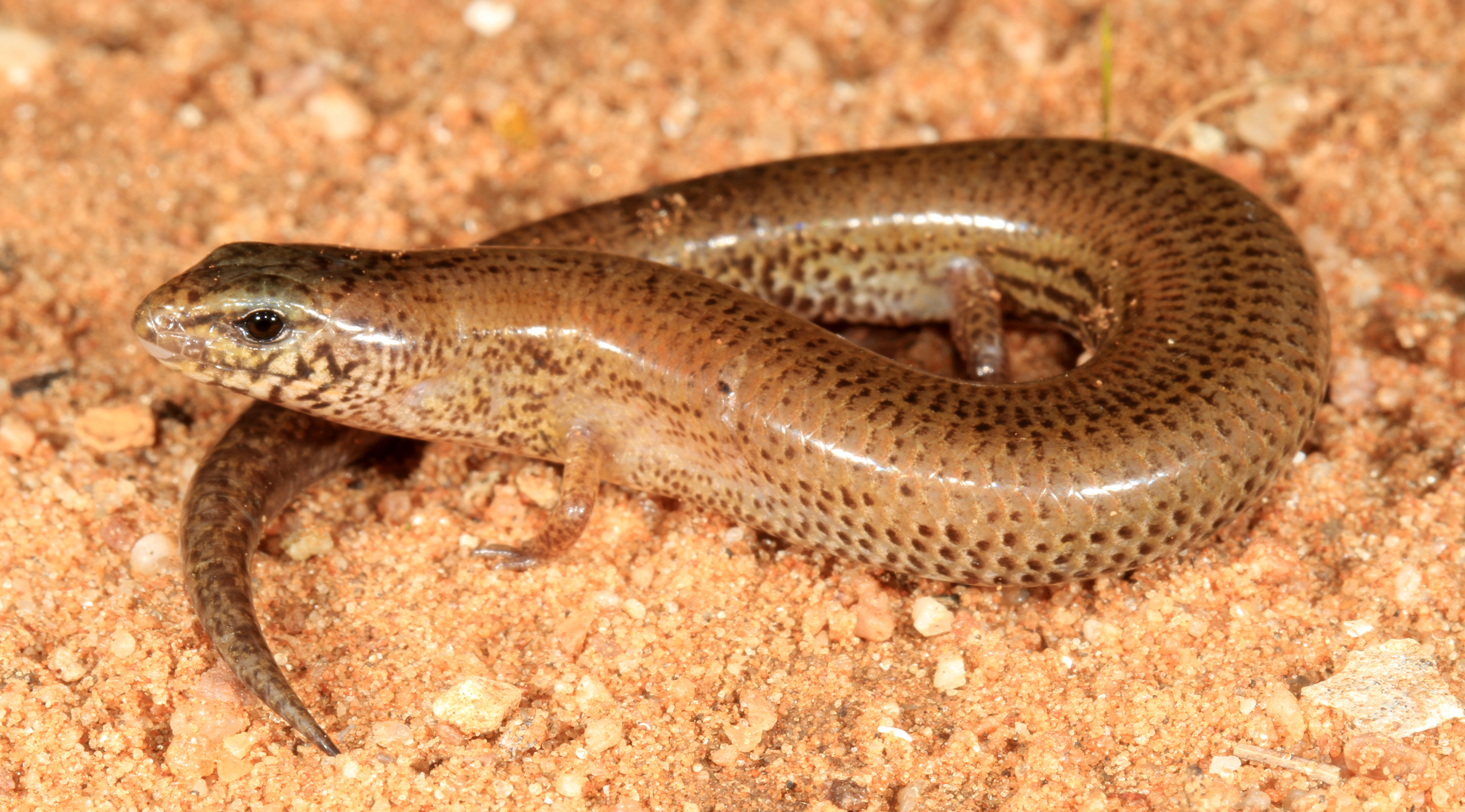

Conservation status
- Least Concern (IUCN 3.1)

Scientific classification
- Kingdom: Animalia
- Phylum: Chordata
- Class: Reptilia
- Order: Squamata
- Family: Scincidae
- Genus: Hemiergis
- Species: H. peronii

Binomial name
- Hemiergis peronii (Gray, 1831)

Synonyms
- Seps peronii Gray, 1831; Lygosoma (Leiolopisma) peronii (Gray, 1831); Chiamela duvaucellii Gray, 1839; Hemiergis woodwardi Lucas & C. Frost, 1902; Lygosoma (Hemiergis) quadridigitatum F. Werner, 1910

= Four-toed earless skink =

Species of lizard

The four-toed earless skink (Hemiergis peronii), also known commonly as Péron's earless skink, the lowlands earless skink, and the four-toed mulch skink, is a species of viviparous earless skink, a lizard in the subfamily Sphenomorphinae of the family Scincidae. The species is endemic to southern Australia.

== Etymology ==
The specific name, peronii, is in honor of François Péron, a French naturalist and explorer.

== Geographic range ==
Hemiergis peronii is found in coastal and subcoastal areas of the following Australian states: Western Australia, South Australia, and western Victoria.

== Habitat ==
The preferred natural habitats of Hemiergis peronii are forest and shrubland.

== Description ==
Hemiergis peronii has an average snout-to-vent length (SVL) of 8 cm (3.1 in).

== Behavior ==
Hemiergis peronii is terrestrial and forages in plant litter.

== Reproduction ==
The mode of reproduction of Hemiergis peronii has been described as viviparous and as ovoviviparous. Females are sexually mature at three years, and reproduce annually. Litter size is 2–4 newborns.
