= Bimodal reproduction =

Bimodal reproduction is the ability of a vertebrate animal to reproduce by both laying eggs and giving birth. Examples of these animals include Saiphos equalis and Zootoca vivipara,
