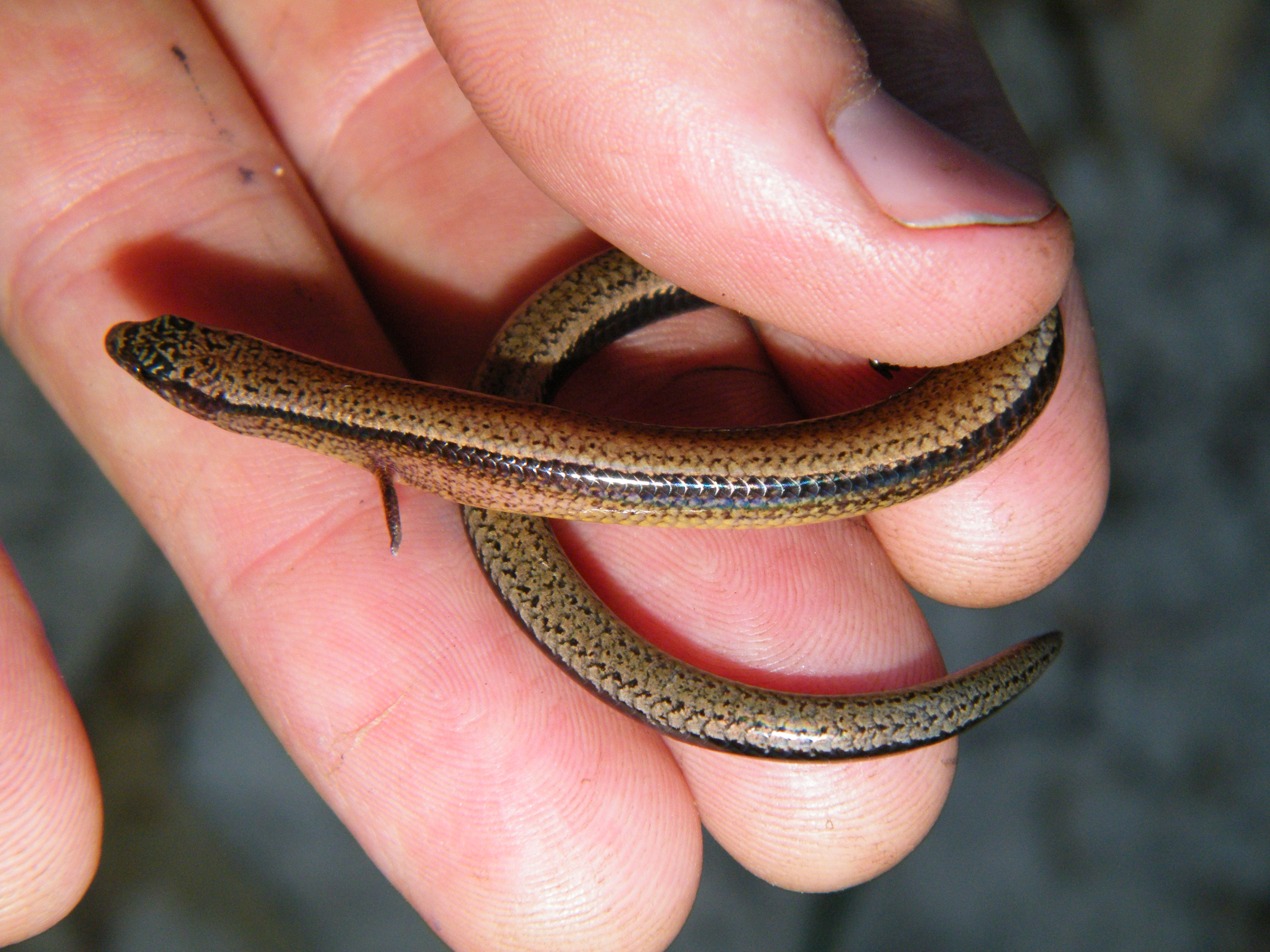

Conservation status
- Least Concern (IUCN 3.1)

Scientific classification
- Kingdom: Animalia
- Phylum: Chordata
- Class: Reptilia
- Order: Squamata
- Family: Scincidae
- Genus: Saiphos; Gray, 1830
- Species: S. equalis

Binomial name
- Saiphos equalis (Gray, 1825)
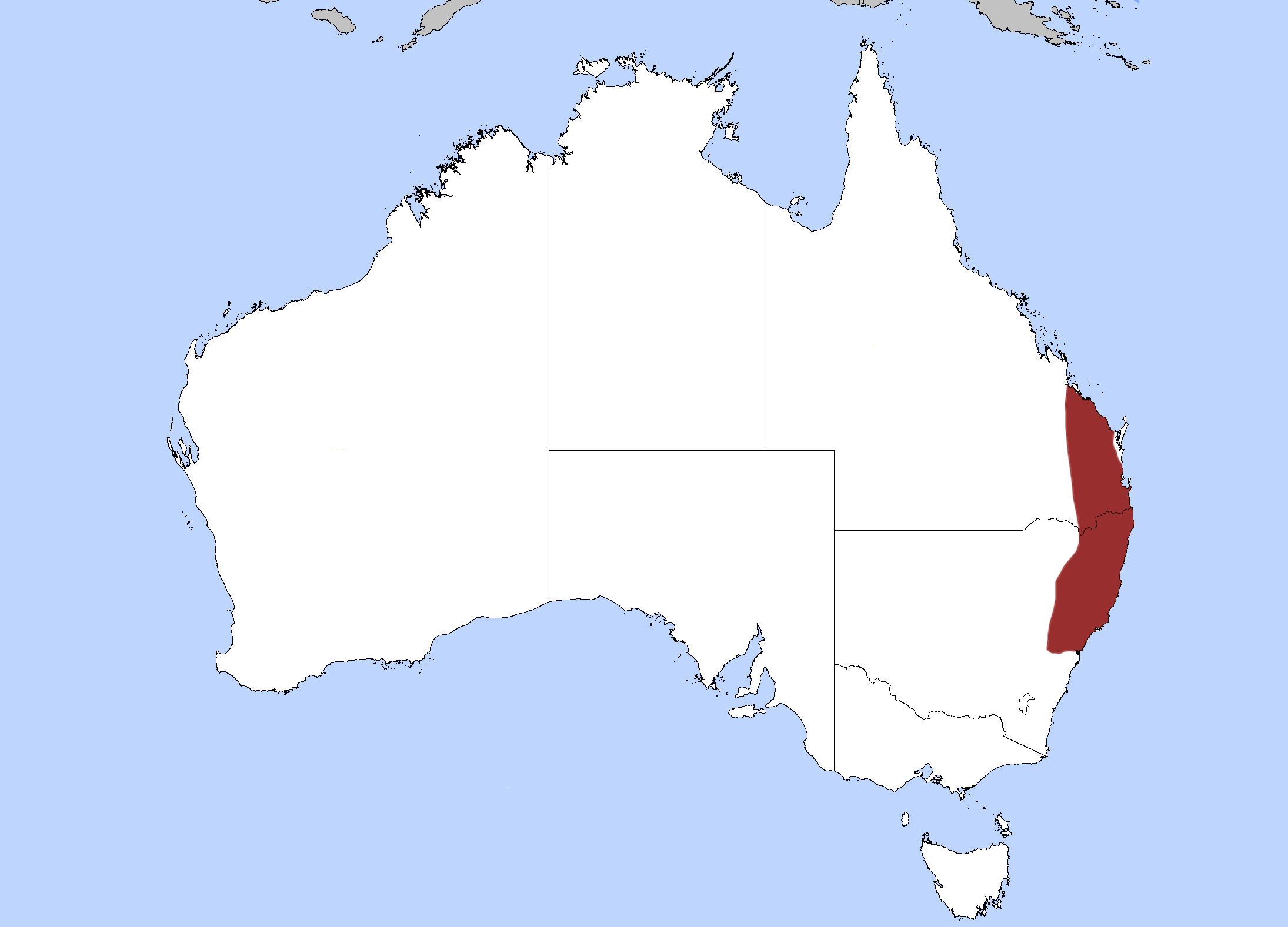
- Distribution of the Yellow-bellied three-toed Skink

Synonyms
- Seps equalis Gray, 1825; Anguis lacertina Gray, 1831 (nomen nudum); Siaphos [sic] aequalis — Gray, 1839 (emendation); Lygosoma (Siaphos) aequale — Longman, 1915; Saiphos aequalis — Greer et al., 2006; Siaphos aequalis (Gray, 1839); Saiphos samueli Wells & Wellington, 1985; Saiphos equalis — Cogger, 1983

= Saiphos =

Species of reptile

Saiphos equalis, commonly known as the yellow-bellied three-toed skink or simply three-toed skink, is a species of burrowing skink found in eastern Australia. It is the only species classified under the genus Saiphos.

The lizard has attracted scientific attention due to its dual reproduction habits of producing young via eggs in coastal populations, or via live young in colder mountain regions.

== Description ==
Saiphos equalis grows to a length of 18 cm (7.1 in) including the tail. It has a brown back and an orange belly. The skink is active at night, and feeds on insects. Along the coastal lowlands of Australia, the skink has been observed laying eggs and giving birth to live young for reproduction. Individuals of the species in the lowlands lay eggs (oviparous), while its neighbors to the north in the mountains are almost exclusively giving birth to live young (viviparous).

== Taxonomy and nomenclature ==
Saiphos equalis was originally described by the British zoologist John Edward Gray in 1825 as Seps equalis. In 1831, Gray reclassified it under a genus he separately established, Saiphos.

Saiphos equalis is now considered to be the only member of the genus Saiphos. It belongs to the subfamily Lygosominae of the skink family Scincidae. Phylogenetic analysis in 2003 showed that the closest sister taxa of Saiphos equalis are Coeranoscincus reticulatus and members of the genus Ophioscincus. They are part of the Australian Sphenomorphus group, a large monophyletic clade within Lygosominae.

== Distribution and habitat ==
Saiphos equalis are common in New South Wales and Queensland of eastern Australia.

== Reproduction ==
Saiphos equalis includes populations of three main reproductive modes: oviparous with long (15 days) incubation periods, viviparous with no incubation period (0 days), and intermediate populations that are oviparous with short (~5 days) incubation periods. No populations of this skink exhibit normal scincid oviparity behavior with greater-than-30-day incubation periods, which could further indicate this skink is truly making the transition to exclusively viviparity.

In a study, published in 2001, of coastal Saiphos equalis populations, mitochondrial nucleotide sequences (ND2 and cytochrome b) were used to organize the relationships among the various populations. According to Smith et al. the analysis suggests that the long incubation period oviparous lineage is the sister group to the other short-period oviparous and viviparous populations. These clades are consistent and correspond to variation in reproductive modes as well as geographic location according to latitude and altitude.

Lizards from high elevation sites (greater than 1,000 m (3,300 ft)) in north-eastern New South Wales are viviparous, while low-elevation populations from northern and southern in New South Wales exhibit short-period oviparity, an intermediate between viviparity and typical oviparous behaviors. The viviparous populations give birth to fully developed offspring in transparent membranes, while the short-day oviparous populations give birth to partly shelled eggs that contain mostly developed embryos. The embryo continues to develop in the egg prior to hatching. In the northernmost coastal region of New South Wales, the lizards have relatively long incubation periods (approximately 15 days), and the eggshells are thicker.

In April 2019 Saiphos equalis made news when researchers from the University of Sydney reported observing a female laying eggs and giving birth to live young from the same pregnancy, the first reported observation of a vertebrate doing this.
