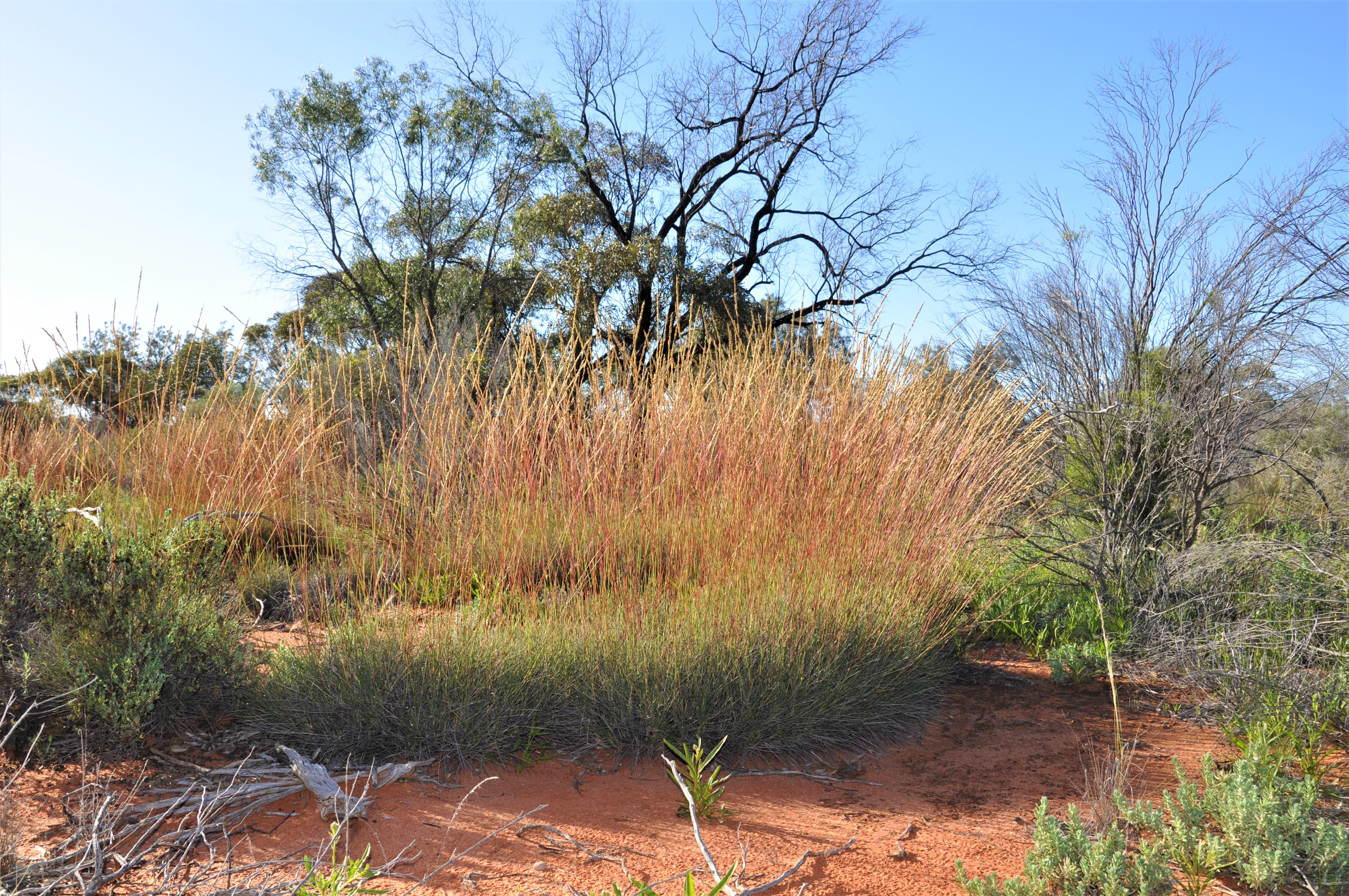
- Triodia scariosa depicting annular growth ring with inflorescence

Scientific classification
- Kingdom: Plantae
- Clade: Tracheophytes
- Clade: Angiosperms
- Clade: Monocots
- Clade: Commelinids
- Order: Poales
- Family: Poaceae
- Subfamily: Chloridoideae
- Genus: Triodia
- Species: T. scariosa

Binomial name
- Triodia scariosa N.T.Burb
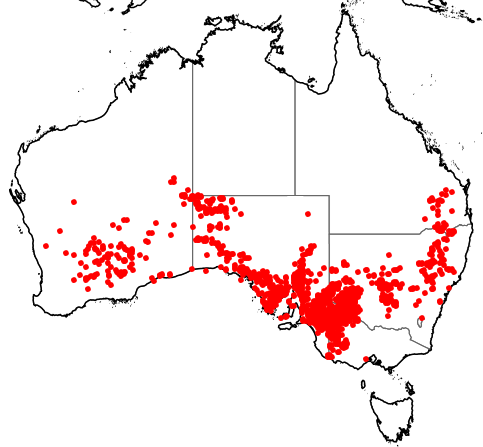
- Occurrence data from ALA

Synonyms
- Species synonymy: Triodia bunicola (S.W.L.Jacobs) Lazarides; Triodia bunicola (S.W.L.Jacobs) Lazarides; Triodia bunicola (S.W.L.Jacobs) Lazarides; Triodia irritans var. laxispicata N.T.Burb.; Triodia scariosa subsp. bunicola; Triodia scariosa subsp. yelarbonensis S.W.L.Jacobs; Triodia truncata S.W.L.Jacobs

= Triodia scariosa =

Species of plant

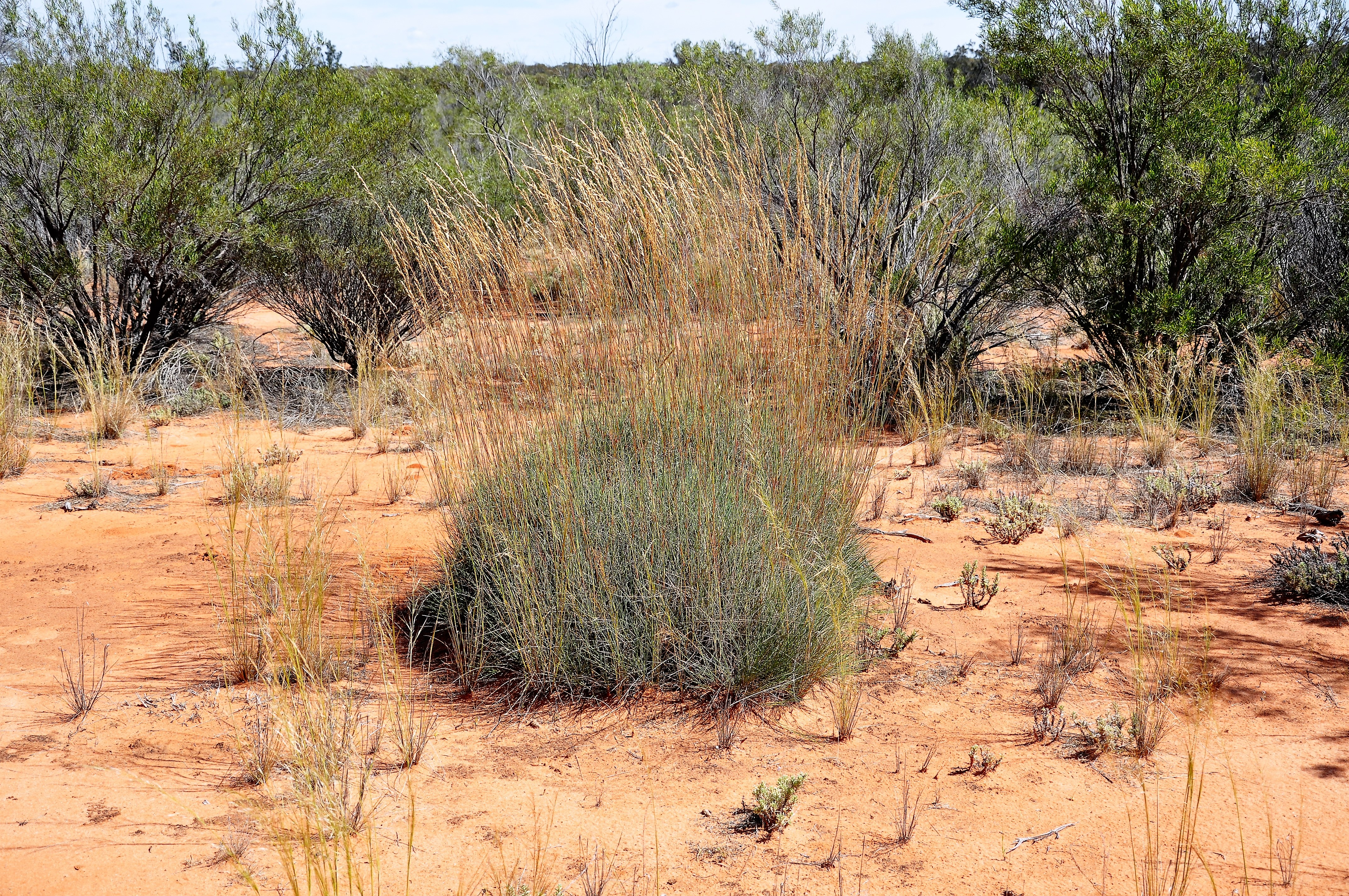
Triodia scariosa in hummock form with inflorescence (Following heavy rains). Nanya Research Station, NSW. Nov 2022.

Triodia scariosa, is more commonly known as porcupine grass or spinifex (not to be confused with Spinifex spp.), and belongs to the endemic Australian grass genus Triodia. The species is perennial and evergreen and individuals grow in mounds, called hummocks, that reach up to ~1m in height. The leaves are ~30 cm long, 1mm in diameter, needlepointed and rigid, and its inflorescence is a narrow, loose panicle that forms a flowering stalk up to ~2m in height. The name is derived from Latin; Triodia refers to the three-toothed lobes of the lemma, and scariosa is in reference to the thin, dry glume. The species is common to Mallee (MVG14) and Hummock grassland (MVG20) communities, in arid and semi-arid regions of Australia.

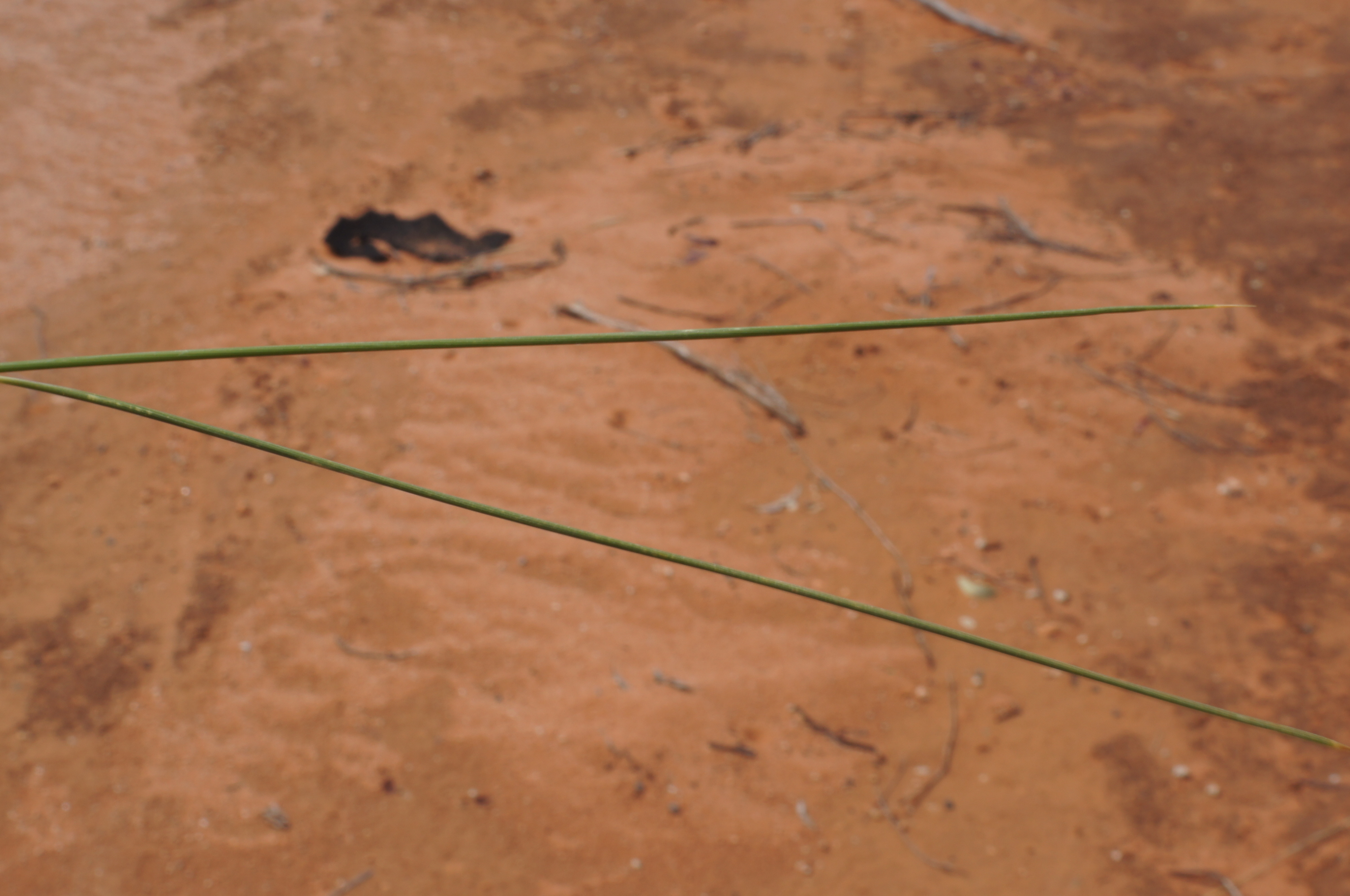
Leaf of Triodia scariosa

== Evolutionary relationships ==
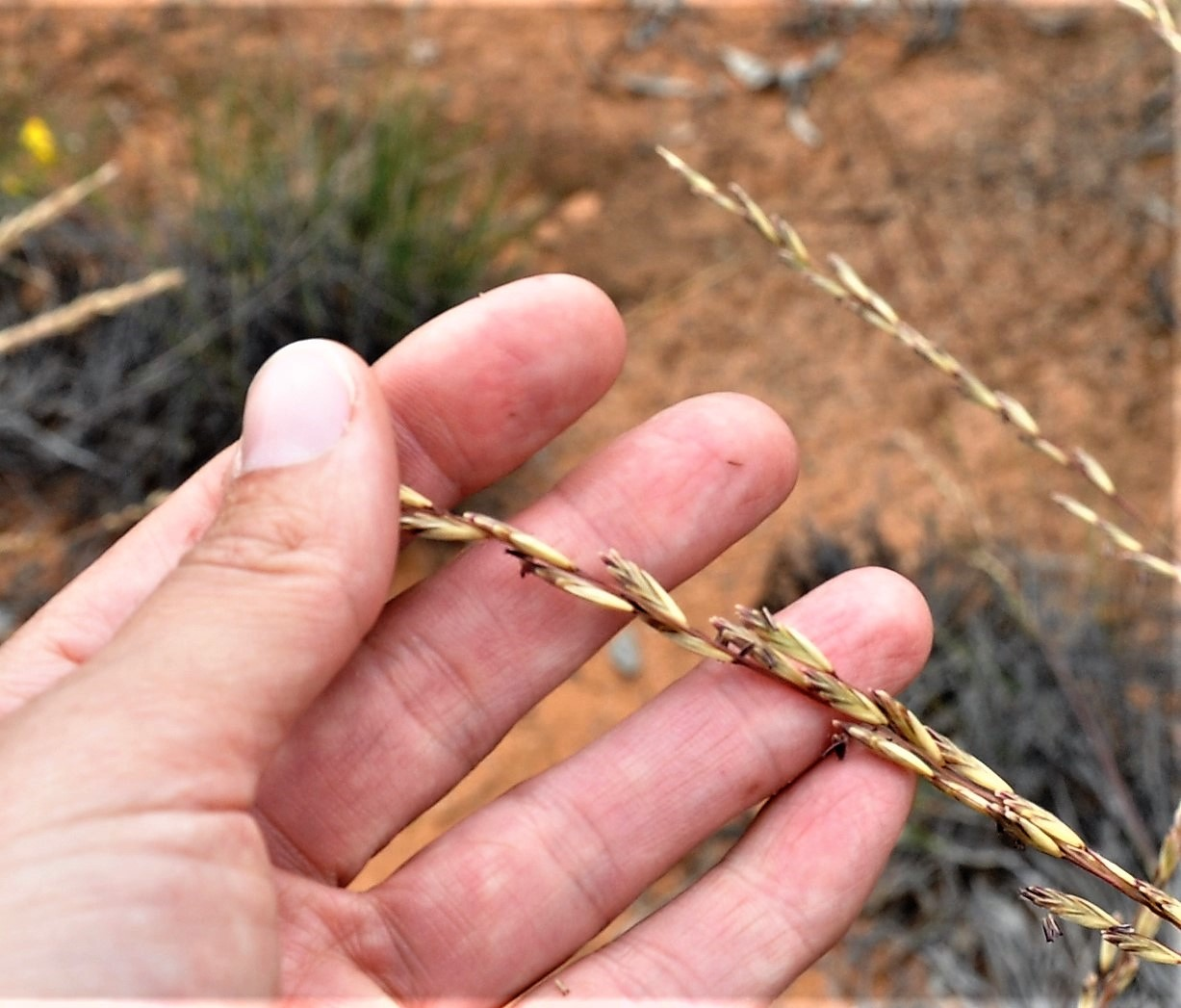
Panicle (inflorescence) and seed formation of Triodia scariosa. Nanya Research Station, NSW. Nov 2022.

Triodia scariosa can be accurately traced back to the order Poales (Grasses, sedges and their relatives). Poales are found globally and represent one third of moncotyledons (~20,000 species), and approximately 7% of all angiosperms. Poales branch away from other monocotyledons in the late cretaceous (>65 million years ago) and can be identified by three gene sequences (rbcL, atpB, and 18S rDNA). In this order, Poaceae (grasses) form the largest family which are recognised by their branching growth pattern (where shoots follow a consecutive branching order). Poaceae are phylogenetically linked to South America and Africa, Australia's break away away from Gondwana ~35mya is thought to have influenced the evolution of the graminid clade that is predominantly found in Australia.

The genus Triodia is part of the subfamily Chloridoideae that thought to have diversified in drier habitats with the evolution of the C_{4} photosynthetic process. The genus was first described by Robert Brown in 1810 and included six species. Since 1937, it has included only Australian species and currently acknowledges 73 distinct species (increasing) including T. scariosa. Increased access to DNA sequencing data is improving accuracy of species identification, for example, a study undertaken in 2012 found that T. scariosa and T. bunicola were in fact the same species and are now recognised as a single species under the T. scariosa clade.

== Distribution ==
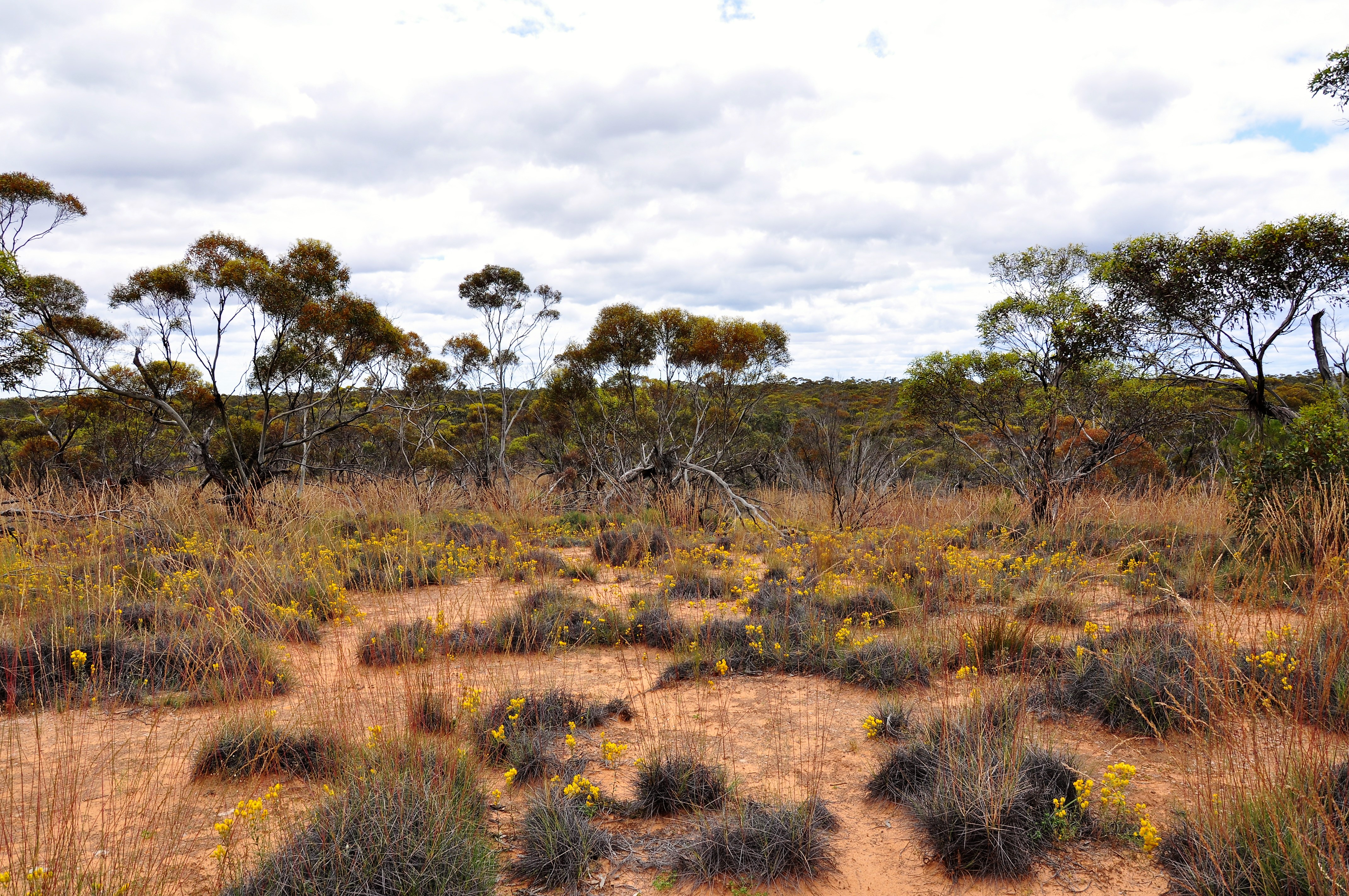
Triodia scariosa with inflorescence in Hattah-Kulkyne NP, Vic. Nov 2022. Following heavy rain.

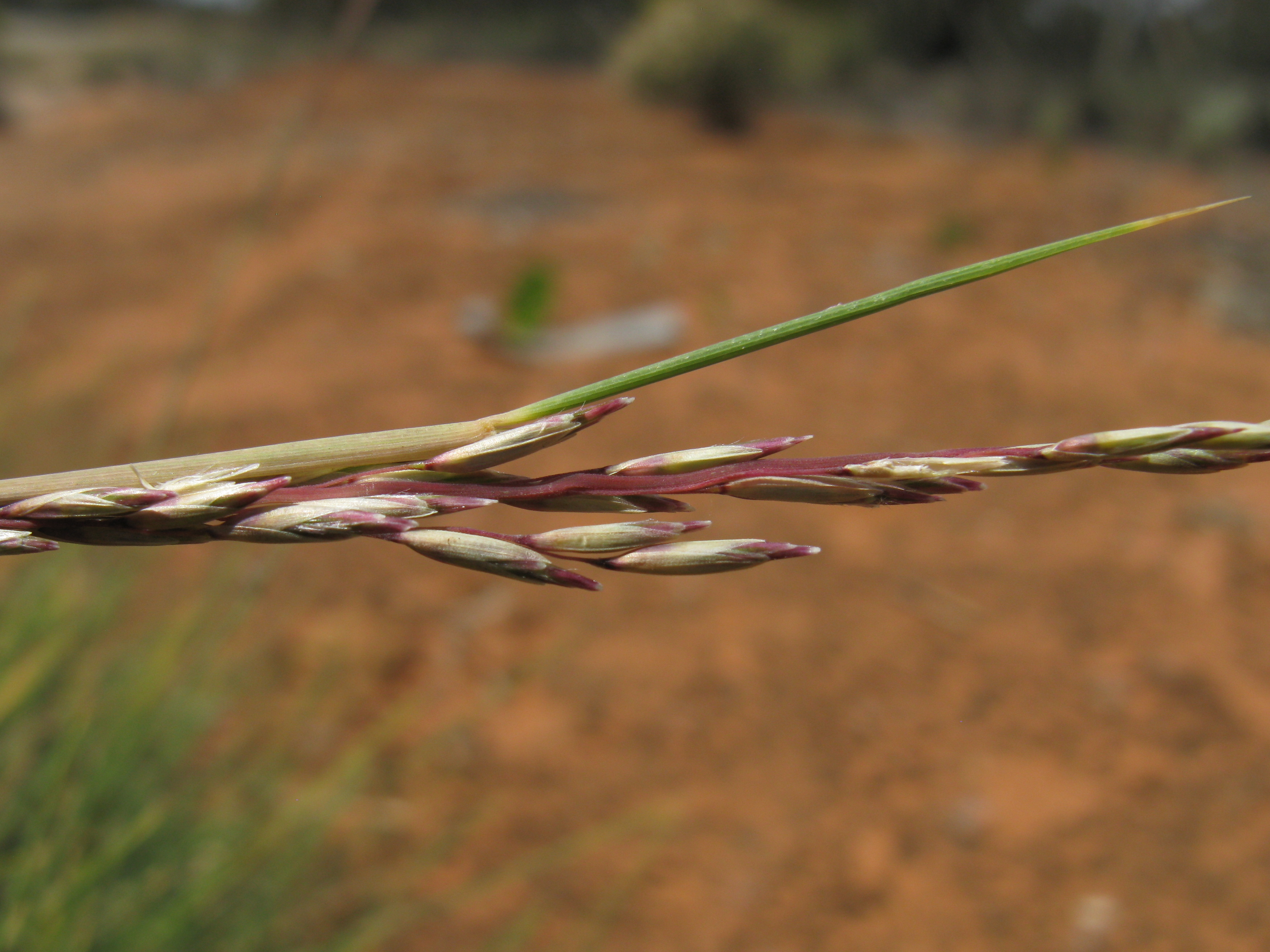
T. scariosa spikelet of flowerhead

Triodia scariosa occurs throughout semi-arid and arid regions of mainland Australia south of ~24^{o} latitude (excludes Northern Territory and Tasmania) and mostly within a mean annual rainfall of 200-400mm. The species occurs in its highest abundance in the Mediterranean-type climate of the Mallee ecosystem found in Western Australia, South Australia and western Victoria. Although T. scariosa occurs in hummock grasslands (MVG20) of the arid interior, it is at much lower densities. The increase in abundance, and growth, of the species in the semi-arid Mallee ecosystem is due to increased rainfall and the presence of yellow sandy soils (compared to the red sandy soils of the arid interior).

== Conservation status ==
Triodia scariosa is common, and currently not listed as threatened at state or national level. However, numerous threatened species and ecosystems are reliant on T. scariosa as a foundation species. For example, in the critically endangered ecological community ‘Porcupine Grass-Red Mallee-Gum Coolabah hummock grassland/low sparse woodland in the Broken Hill Complex Bioregion’ (NSW), T. scariosa is habitat for three endangered lizard species (Cyclodomorphus melanops elongatus, Delma australis, and Ctenophorus decresii) . Similarly, in the Murray-Mallee (North west Victoria, adjacent South Australia and south west New South Wales) ongoing effects of historic land clearing, fragmentation, altered fire regimes and climate change have been identified as drivers that are likely to impact the long term persistence of T. scariosa in this landscape. Further, numerous endemic and highly threatened species are reliant on T. scariosa in this ecosystem for their persistence in the wild (e.g. Stipiturus Mallee, Ningaui yvonneae, Ctenophorus fordi).

== Ecology ==
Throughout its range, T. scariosa is a foundation species; fundamental to the resilience and structure of an ecosystem. A broad range of fauna taxa are associated with T. scariosa including birds, mammals, reptiles and arthropods, which utilise the complex growth structures for foraging, nesting, refuge from predators and temperature amelioration. The endangered Mallee Emu-wren (Stipiturus mallee), endemic to the Murray-Mallee, relies entirely on the species for hunting, nesting, mating, foraging and breeding and rarely disperses out of the hummocks. Additionally, very high lizard diversity and abundance is associated with T. scariosa.

Vegetation species associated with T. scariosa are associated with its distribution within its range and the regions climate. In the arid zone, it co-occurs with other Triodia species, and is also associated with Acacia, Corymbia, and Eucalyptus woodland. In the southern aspect of its range, it is most commonly associated with an overstory dominated by Mallee Eucalypts (Eucalyptus dumosa and E. socialis), but also Callitris, Melaleuca, Acacia and Hakea. T. scariosa distribution is associated with soils that are low in available water and nutrients and the extensive root system provides mechanical support for soils, reducing the loss of the thin aeolian topsoil layer.

Triodia scariosa contributes to the fire ecology of a landscape, as the dry fuel load from ageing individuals in the landscape increases in mass in the time since fire before plateauing and declining . In the Murray-Mallee, wildfires are large (1000's ha), burn at both high and uniform severity and connection through the landscape is provided by the continuous fuel source of T. scariosa, resulting in top kill of the low canopy tree species. In this landscape, all vegetation is removed following fire, and regeneration is uniform and predictable, including the presence of fauna species. The interval between wildfire in this ecosystem is associated with regeneration of T. scariosa over time, and its accumulation of dead core material, which (under suitable climatic conditions) promotes and sustains wildfire in the landscape. This is usually possible at a minimum interval of 10–20 years post fire, peaking at ~20–30 years, but if rainfall has been high it can be within 2 years.

== Life history traits ==
Regeneration of T. scariosa is heavily linked to rainfall and fire. Heavy rainfall (late spring/early summer) promotes mast seeding and the establishment or elevation of the soil seed bank. Fire kills adult individuals but triggers germination in the stored seedbank, and when followed by later seasonal rains, leads to enhanced seedling germination. The prolonged absence of fire reduces the species ability to regenerate from seed, due to seed viability of only 2–3 years. The species can regenerate poorly from basal meristem, however in arid regions, this promotes the species' survival where rainfall is reduced. The breeding systems of Triodia spp are unclear, but are thought to be both self and cross-fertilising systems.

Growth of T. scariosa occurs via stolons, which expand outward from its centre as the plant ages. The size and complexity of individual plants is influenced by time since fire, environmental factors (soil, ecological relationships) and climate variables. T. scariosa's C4 photosynthetic pathway supports higher growth rates and water use efficiency at higher temperatures, and growth is enhanced with summer rainfall. In the first few years post-fire, T. scariosa cover increases relatively rapidly, peaks at ~30 years, then declines slowly over subsequent decades. It has been suggested that T. scariosa requires >20 years between fire interval for individual plants to mature, and establish seed-banks and habitat complexity before fire returns to ensure suitable levels of regeneration in the landscape.

A notable feature of T. triodia is the annular growth ring that forms with age. As the plant ages, it grows outwardly in ring or crescent form, and the old growth dies off in the centre. These features can grow up to 3m in diameter and individuals may join to form reef-like patterns in the landscape. The rings are uncommon in the first 20–30 years post-fire, but peak at ~55 years, before the plant senesces over the following decades.

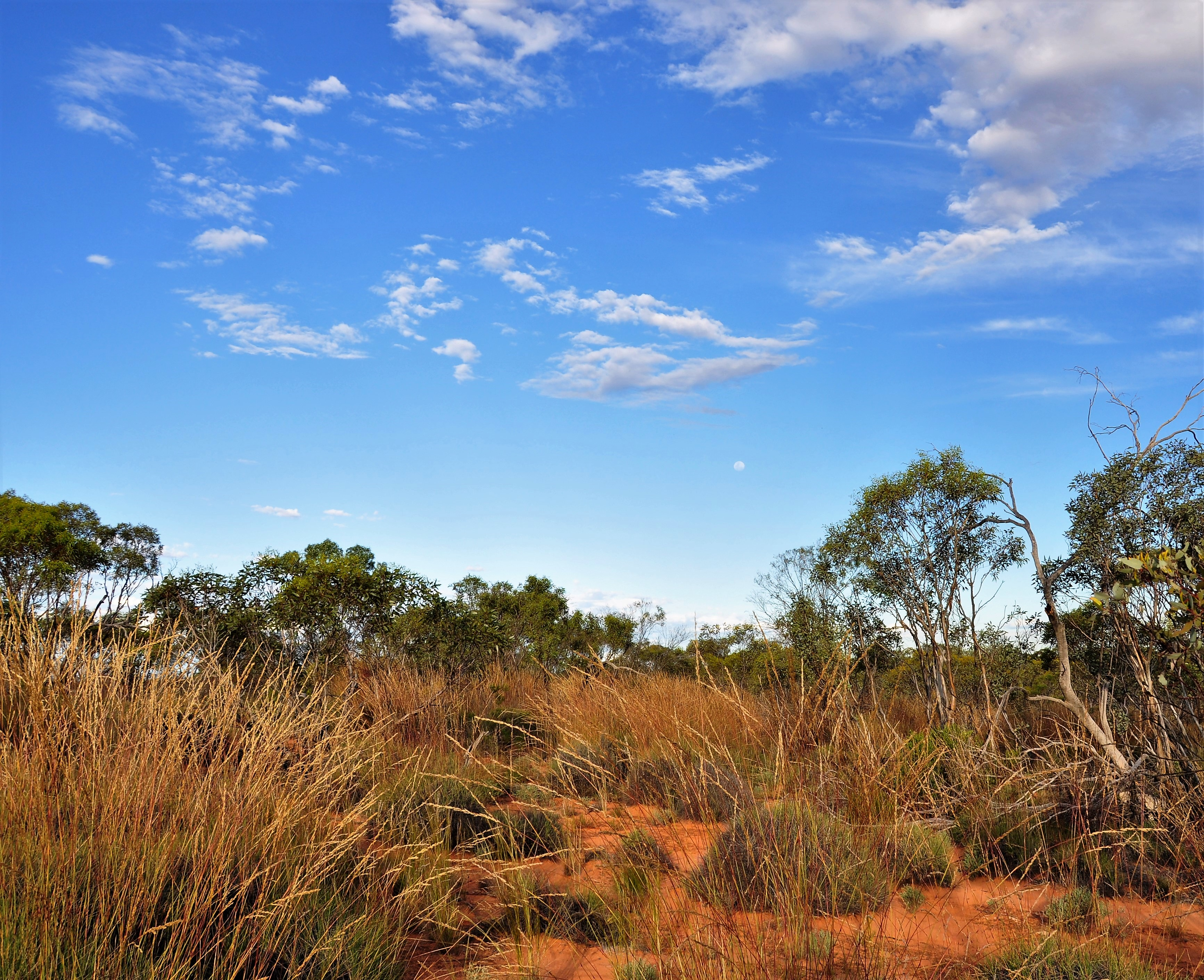
Triodia scariosa in Mallee landscape ~20 years post fire. Nanya research station, NSW. Nov 2022.
