= Deaths in December 2017 =

The following is a list of notable deaths in December 2017.

Entries for each day are listed alphabetically by surname. A typical entry lists information in the following sequence:

- Name, age, country of citizenship at birth, subsequent country of citizenship (if applicable), what subject was noted for, cause of death (if known), and reference.

== December 2017 ==
=== 1 ===
- Adarsh Sein Anand, 81, Indian judge, Chief Justice (1998–2001), Madras High Court (1989–1992), and Jammu and Kashmir High Court (1985–1989).
- Enrico Castellani, 87, Italian painter.
- Gilbert Chabroux, 83, French politician, Senator (1995–2004).
- Arif Dirlik, 77, Turkish-born American historian.
- Ernie Fazio, 75, American baseball player (Houston Colt .45's), complications from dementia and Parkinson's disease.
- Peter Feldstein, 75, American photographer.
- Åshild Hauan, 76, Norwegian politician, County Governor of Nordland (1993–2007), MP (1981–1993).
- Ken Inglis, 88, Australian historian.
- Anna Krzeptowska-Żebracka, 79, Polish Olympic cross-country skier.
- Philipp Graf Lerchenfeld, 65, German politician, member of the Bundestag (2013–2017) and the Landtag of Bavaria (2003–2013), lung cancer.
- James Marson, 91, French politician, Senator (1975–1986).
- Ruben Rozendaal, 61, Surinamese soldier (1980 coup d'état).
- Fredy Schmidtke, 56, German track cyclist, Olympic champion (1984), heart attack.
- Abba Siddick, 92, Chadian politician and revolutionary.
- Cleopatra Tawo, Nigerian radio host.
- George Twigg III, 85, American politician.
- Uli Vos, 71, German field hockey player, Olympic champion (1972).
- Perry Wallace, 69, American basketball player (Vanderbilt University) and jurist.

=== 2 ===
- Jean Barthe, 85, French rugby league and rugby union (FC Lourdes) player.
- William Blankenship, 89, American operatic tenor.
- Frances Marie Burke, 95, American beauty pageant contestant, Miss America winner (1940).
- Ivan Chermayeff, 85, British-born American graphic designer.
- Matt Cunningham, 83, Australian rules footballer (Fitzroy).
- Hugh Davies, 85, Welsh cricketer (Glamorgan).
- Norihiko Hashida, 72, Japanese folk singer-songwriter (The Folk Crusaders), Parkinson's disease.
- Leena Kaskela, 77, Finnish journalist (MTV3).
- Jerzy Kłoczowski, 92, Polish historian, professor (John Paul II Catholic University of Lublin) and member of the Senate (1990–1991).
- Ulli Lommel, 72, German actor and director (The Boogeyman, The Tenderness of Wolves, Love Is Colder Than Death), heart failure.
- Mundell Lowe, 95, American jazz guitarist and composer.
- Marianne Means, 83, American political journalist and columnist, complications from colon cancer.
- Edwin Mosquera, 32, Colombian Olympic weightlifter (2016), Pan American champion (2008, 2010), shot.
- Maureen Prinsloo, 79, Canadian politician, Chairwoman of the Toronto Police Services Board (1995–1998), brain cancer.
- Mekkawi Said, 61, Egyptian novelist and short story writer.
- Hannes Schiel, 103, Austrian actor.
- Ewald Schurer, 63, German politician, member of the Bundestag (1998–2002, since 2005).
- Nava Semel, 63, Israeli author and playwright, cancer.
- Alan Sinfield, 76, English literary critic.
- Nikola Špear, 73, Yugoslav tennis player and coach.
- Bruce M. Stave, 80, American historian.
- Les Whitten, 89, American investigative reporter (Radio Free Europe, The Washington Post).

=== 3 ===
- John B. Anderson, 95, American lawyer (Anderson v. Celebrezze) and politician, member of the U.S. House of Representatives for Illinois's 16th district (1961–1981).
- Leo Beukeboom, 74, Dutch signpainter.
- Adam Darius, 87, American dancer and choreographer.
- Elmar Faber, 83, German publisher.
- Jack Felder, 78, American biochemist.
- John Ferrant, 83, South African cricketer.
- Thomas Finlay, 95, Irish judge and politician, TD (1954–1957), Chief Justice (1985–1994).
- Ernest A. Finney Jr., 86, American judge, Chief Justice of the South Carolina Supreme Court (1994–2000).
- Fil Fraser, 85, Canadian broadcaster, heart failure.
- Paul Genève, 92, French Olympic long-distance runner (1960).
- Patrick Henry, 64, French murderer, lung cancer.
- Barbara Hoyt, 65, American nurse (Manson Family), kidney failure.
- Gene Hubka, 93, American football player (Pittsburgh Steelers).
- Jack Laraway, 82, American football player (Houston Oilers, Buffalo Bills).
- Kjell Opseth, 81, Norwegian politician, Minister of Transport and Communications (1990–1996).
- Kazimierz Pawełek, 81, Polish politician, journalist and writer.
- Carl Axel Petri, 88, Swedish lawyer and politician, Minister for Energy (1979–1981) and Justice (1981–1982).
- Leandro Rizzuto, 79, American consumer products executive (Conair), pancreatic cancer.
- Orlando Ruíz, 82, Cuban Olympic fencer.
- Ian Twitchin, 65, English footballer (Torquay United).
- Basclay Zapata, 71, Chilean military officer, cancer.

=== 4 ===
- Armenak Alachachian, 86, Armenian basketball player, Olympic silver medalist (1964), European champion (1953, 1961, 1963, 1965).
- Robert Alt, 90, Swiss bobsledder, Olympic champion (1956).
- Ron Attwell, 82, Canadian ice hockey player (St. Louis Blues, New York Rangers).
- Alastair Bellingham, 79, British haematologist, President of the Royal College of Pathologists (1993–1996).
- Mary Louise Hancock, 97, American politician, member of the New Hampshire Senate (1977–1979).
- Alexander Harvey II, 94, American federal judge, U.S. District Court for the District of Maryland (1966–1991), prostate cancer.
- Jimmy Hood, 69, British politician, MP for Clydesdale (1987–2005) and Lanark and Hamilton East (2005–2015), heart attack.
- Henning Jensen, 68, Danish footballer (Borussia Mönchengladbach, Real Madrid, national team), cancer.
- Shashi Kapoor, 79, Indian actor and director (Deewaar, Bombay Talkie, Shakespeare Wallah), cirrhosis.
- Christine Keeler, 75, English model and showgirl involved in Profumo affair, chronic obstructive pulmonary disease.
- Liu Lunxian, 74, Chinese politician and military officer.
- Manuel Marín, 68, Spanish politician, President of the European Commission (1999) and the Congress of Deputies (2004–2008), lung cancer.
- Guillermo Mosquera, 53, Colombian boxer, cancer.
- Thor Munkager, 66, Danish Olympic handball player (1972, 1976) and coach.
- Annette Page, 84, English ballerina.
- Gregory Rigters, 32, Surinamese footballer (national team), traffic collision.
- Ali Abdullah Saleh, 70, Yemeni politician, President of North Yemen (1978–1990) and President (1990–2012), shot.
- Carles Santos, 77, Spanish pianist and composer.
- Angel Sotirov, 74, Bulgarian Olympic wrestler.
- James R. Thompson, 79, American statistician.
- John Baptist Todd, 96, Pakistani Franciscan priest.
- Kevin Walsh, 92, Australian neuropsychologist.
- Rudolph G. Wilson, 82, American educator.
- Edward Zemprelli, 92, American politician, member of the Pennsylvania State Senate (1969–1988).

=== 5 ===
- Adithyan, 63, Indian composer, kidney disease.
- August Ames, 23, Canadian pornographic actress, suicide by hanging.
- Claudine Arnaud, 77, Belgian soprano singer.
- Maureen Baker, 97, British fashion designer.
- Tharwat Bassily, 77, Egyptian television executive, founder of Coptic TV.
- Michel Dighneef, 80, Belgian footballer (R.F.C. Tilleur) and politician, Senator (1991–1995), MP (1995–1999).
- Victor Fontana, 101, Brazilian politician, Vice-Governor of Santa Catarina (1983–1987).
- Elenito Galido, 64, Filipino Roman Catholic prelate, Bishop of Iligan (since 2006).
- Maurice Green, 91, American virologist.
- Johnny Hallyday, 74, French rock singer ("Requiem pour un fou", "Marie", "Tous ensemble") and actor, lung cancer.
- John P. Harllee, 75, American politician.
- Bob Honeysett, 83, Australian rugby footballer.
- Keijo Koivumäki, 91, Finnish Olympic rower.
- Rosemary Margan, 80, Australian television presenter.
- Claude Martin, 87, French rower, Olympic silver medalist (1960).
- Ron Meyer, 76, American football coach (New England Patriots, Indianapolis Colts), aortic aneurysm.
- Michael I, 96, Romanian royal, King (1927–1930, 1940–1947), complications from leukemia.
- Cristina Nicolau, 40, Romanian Olympic triple jumper (2000), European Athletics U23 champion (1997, 1999).
- Lila O'Connor, 77, Canadian politician.
- Jean d'Ormesson, 92, French writer, columnist, reporter and philosopher.
- Meic Povey, 67, Welsh actor and playwright (Pobol y Cwm, Minder), cancer.
- Laurie Rymer, 83, Australian footballer (Collingwood).
- Svein Scharffenberg, 78, Norwegian actor (Cabin Fever).
- Jacques Simon, 76, French footballer (Nantes, Bordeaux, national team).
- Duncan Simpson, 89, Scottish test pilot.
- Peter Sugandhar, 75, Indian Church of South India prelate, Bishop of Medak (1993–2009).
- Pamela Tudor-Craig, 89, British art historian, pulmonary fibrosis.

=== 6 ===
- Lucyna Andrysiak, 62, Polish politician.
- Conrad Brooks, 86, American actor (Plan 9 from Outer Space, Glen or Glenda, The Beast of Yucca Flats), complications from sepsis.
- Juan Luis Buñuel, 83, French film director.
- Charles J. Cella, 81, American real estate executive and racetrack operator (Oaklawn Racing & Gaming), Parkinson's disease.
- Juanjo Díaz, 68, Spanish football coach (RCD Espanyol).
- Jacob Kuwinsuk Gale, South Sudanese politician, shot.
- Gao Bolong, 89, Chinese engineer.
- William H. Gass, 93, American novelist (The Tunnel), critic and philosophy professor, heart failure.
- Derry Gowen, 84, Irish hurler and Gaelic footballer.
- Kathleen Karr, 71, American novelist.
- George E. Killian, 93, American sports administrator, President of FIBA (1990–1998).
- Dominic Mai Thanh Lương, 77, Vietnamese-born American Roman Catholic prelate, Auxiliary Bishop of Orange (2003–2015).
- Judith Miller, 76, French psychoanalyst and philosopher.
- Francis Nyenze, 60, Kenyan politician, MP (since 1997), colon cancer.
- Tracy Stallard, 80, American baseball player (Boston Red Sox, New York Mets, St. Louis Cardinals).
- Jim Watson, 85, Scottish comic book artist (TV Century 21, 2000 AD).
- Norman White, 64, American criminologist, heart attack.
- Cy Young, 89, American javelin thrower, Olympic champion (1952), vascular dementia.

=== 7 ===
- Ameer Muhammad Akram Awan, 82, Pakistani religious leader.
- MacDonald Becket, 89, American architect.
- Jack E. Bronston, 95, American politician.
- John Catt, 78, British geologist and soil scientist.
- Chai Hon Yam, 90, Singaporean Olympic field hockey player.
- Fred J. Doocy, 104, American politician and banker, Lieutenant Governor of Connecticut (1966–1967).
- Morton Estrin, 93, American classical pianist.
- Rodney Harris, 85, British geneticist.
- Žermēna Heine-Vāgnere, 94, Latvian opera singer, People's Artist of the USSR (1969).
- Augie Herchenratter, 98, Canadian ice hockey player.
- Tommy Horton, 76, British golfer.
- Kong Hon, 78, Hong Kong actor.
- Ivan Korsak, 71, Ukrainian writer and journalist.
- Subbarao Krishnamurthy, 79, Indian cricketer.
- Philippe Maystadt, 69, Belgian politician, Minister of Finance (1988–1998), President of the European Investment Bank (2000–2011), lung disease.
- Alexandru Moșanu, 85, Moldovan politician, President of the Moldovan Parliament (1990–1993), cancer.
- Sunny Murray, 81, American jazz drummer (Cecil Taylor, Albert Ayler).
- Steve Reevis, 55, American actor (Fargo, Geronimo: An American Legend, The Longest Yard).
- Neil Ritchie, 84, New Zealand Olympic cyclist.
- Sir Christus, 39, Finnish rock guitarist (Negative).
- Roland Taylor, 71, American basketball player (Virginia Squires, Denver Nuggets), cancer.
- Matthias Yu Chengxin, 89, Chinese clandestine Roman Catholic prelate, Coadjutor Bishop of Hanzhong (1989–2007).
- Peter Walwyn, 84, British racehorse trainer.

=== 8 ===
- Ruth Sharp Altshuler, 93, American philanthropist.
- Ron Boehm, 74, Canadian ice hockey player (Oakland Seals).
- Laloo Chiba, 87, South African politician and revolutionary.
- James P. Cullen, 72, American brigadier-general, member of the Judge Advocate General's Corps.
- Vladimir Curbet, 87, Moldovan choreographer, People's Artist of the USSR (1981).
- Pál Dárdai, 66, Hungarian football player and manager.
- Virginia Douglas, 90, Canadian psychologist.
- Betty Duguid, 85, Canadian-born American curler.
- Josy Eisenberg, 83, French television producer and rabbi.
- Magda Fedor, 103, Hungarian sports shooter.
- Carlos María Franzini, 66, Argentine Roman Catholic prelate, Bishop of Rafaela (2000–2012), Archbishop of Mendoza (since 2012).
- Howard Gottfried, 94, American film producer (Network, Suburban Commando, Torch Song Trilogy), stroke.
- Jack Hayward, 86, British political scientist.
- Patricia Hiddleston. 84, Scottish mathematician.
- Rudi Maier, 72, German Olympic fencer.
- Vincent Nguini, 65, Cameroonian guitarist (Paul Simon), liver cancer.
- Atsutoshi Nishida, 73, Japanese consumer electronics executive, President of Toshiba (2005–2009), heart attack.
- Flerida Ruth Pineda-Romero, 88, Filipino judge, Associate Justice of the Supreme Court (1991–1999).
- Tubby Raymond, 91, American football coach (Delaware Blue Hens), national champion (1979).
- Im Sothy, 70, Cambodian politician, MP (since 1993), Minister of Education, Youth and Sport (2004–2013).
- Alexander Taransky, 76, Australian Olympic sports shooter (1968, 1972, 1976).
- Gloria Ann Taylor, 73, American soul singer.
- Ocimar Versolato, 56, Brazilian fashion designer, aneurysm following a stroke.
- Morris Zelditch, 89, American sociologist, bladder cancer.

=== 9 ===
- Horst Beyer, 77, German Olympic decathlete (1964, 1972).
- James Joseph Brady, 73, American judge, member of the U.S. District Court for Middle Louisiana (since 2000).
- Leonid Bronevoy, 88, Ukrainian-born Russian actor (Simple Things), People's Artist of the USSR (1987).
- Joey Corpus, 59, Filipino-American violin teacher.
- Frances Esemplare, 83, American actress (The Sopranos).
- Ching Li, 72, Taiwanese actress.
- Lando Fiorini, 79, Italian actor and singer.
- Allen C. Kelley, 80, American economist.
- Abdullah Khan, 83–84, Pakistani Olympic sprinter.
- Damian Le Bas, 54, British artist.
- Marshall Loeb, 88, American business journalist and editor (Fortune, Money, Columbia Journalism Review), Parkinson's disease.
- Benjamin Massing, 55, Cameroonian footballer (Créteil, national team).
- Charles H. McNutt, 88, American archaeologist and scholar.
- Grant Munro, 94, Canadian animator and filmmaker (Christmas Cracker).
- Heitaro Nakajima, 96, Japanese digital audio pioneer.
- Joe Newton, 88, American track and field coach (York (Ill.) High School).
- Lyndon Pete Patterson, 82, American politician, member of the Texas House of Representatives (1977–1999).
- Bob Pifferini Sr., 95, American football player (Detroit Lions).
- Kevin Robinson, 45, American BMX rider, stroke.
- Leon Rhodes, 85, American country musician.
- Lionginas Šepetys, 91, Lithuanian politician, chairman of Supreme Soviet of the Lithuanian SSR, co-signatory of Act of the Re-Establishment of the State of Lithuania.
- Charles Skeete, 79, Barbadian economist and diplomat, Ambassador to the United States (1981–1983).
- Tony Sumpter, 95, American football player (Chicago Rockets).
- Robin Waters, 80, Irish cricketer (Sussex, Ireland national team).
- Tom Zenk, 59, American bodybuilder and professional wrestler (WCW, AJPW, WWF), arterial sclerosis.

=== 10 ===
- Abe Addams, 91, American football player (Detroit Lions).
- Angry Grandpa, 67, American Internet personality (YouTube), cirrhosis.
- Masood Ahmed Barkati, 84, Pakistani children's author, editor of Hamdard Naunihal.
- John Beer, 91, British literary critic.
- Simeon Booker, 99, American journalist (The Washington Post, Jet, Ebony), complications from pneumonia.
- Bruce Brown, 80, American documentarian (The Endless Summer).
- Manno Charlemagne, 69, Haitian singer-songwriter, guitarist and politician, Mayor of Port-au-Prince (1995–1999), cancer.
- Max Clifford, 74, British publicist and convicted sex offender, heart attack.
- Collier Bay, 27, British racehorse.
- Bette Cooper, 97, American beauty pageant contestant, Miss America winner (1937).
- Bob Dawson, 85, Canadian football player (Hamilton Tiger-Cats).
- James A. Duke, 88, American botanist.
- Curtis W. Harris, 93, American civil rights activist and politician.
- Ronald W. Hodges, 83, American entomologist and lepidopterist.
- Ray Kassar, 89, American executive (Burlington, Atari).
- Piet Kuiper, 83, Dutch botanist.
- Harold Levine, 95, American mathematician.
- Arnold Maran, 80, British surgeon, President of the Royal College of Surgeons of Edinburgh (1997–2000).
- Toni Mascolo, 75, Italian-born British hairdresser and businessman (Toni & Guy).
- Viktor Potapov, 70, Russian sailor, Olympic bronze medalist (1972), traffic collision.
- Roy Reed, 87, American journalist (The New York Times), stroke.
- Antonio Riboldi, 94, Italian Roman Catholic prelate, Bishop of Arcerra (1978–1999).
- Al Rittinger, 92, Canadian ice hockey player (Boston Bruins).
- Kristen Rohlfs, 87, German astronomer.
- Joël Sarlot, 71, French politician, Deputy (1993–2008), Senator (2008–2011).
- Lalji Singh, 70, Indian biologist and zoologist, heart attack.
- Ivan Stoyanov, 68, Bulgarian footballer (Levski Sofia, national team).
- Jernej Šugman, 48, Slovenian actor, heart attack.
- Eva Todor, 98, Hungarian-born Brazilian actress, pneumonia.
- Lev Venediktov, 93, Russian-born Ukrainian choirmaster and teacher, People's Artist of the USSR (1979), Hero of Ukraine (2004).
- Drahomíra Vihanová, 87, Czech filmmaker, documentarist and screenwriter.
- Zarley Zalapski, 49, Canadian ice hockey player (Pittsburgh Penguins, Hartford Whalers, Calgary Flames), complications of a viral infection.

=== 11 ===
- Paul Annett, 80, British director (The Beast Must Die, Poldark, EastEnders).
- Keith Chegwin, 60, English television presenter (Multi-Coloured Swap Shop, Cheggers Plays Pop) and actor (Macbeth), idiopathic pulmonary fibrosis.
- Jean-François Coatmeur, 92, French writer.
- David Roderick Curtis, 90, Australian medical scientist.
- Paul T. Fader, 58, American politician, Mayor of Englewood, New Jersey (1998–2003).
- Aline Griffith, Countess of Romanones, 94, American-born Spanish cipher clerk, aristocrat, socialite and writer.
- Paul Holz, 65, German footballer (FC Schalke 04, VfL Bochum, Borussia Dortmund).
- Charles Robert Jenkins, 77, American soldier, deserted to North Korea.
- Manny Jiménez, 79, Dominican baseball player (Kansas City Athletics, Pittsburgh Pirates, Chicago Cubs).
- Vera Katz, 84, American politician, member (1973–1990) and Speaker (1985–1990) of the Oregon House of Representatives, Mayor of Portland, Oregon (1993–2005), leukemia.
- Suzanna Leigh, 72, British actress (Paradise, Hawaiian Style), liver cancer.
- Walter Mafli, 102, Swiss painter.
- Roland Peterson, 76, Aruban police officer, first Commissioner (1986–1989) and founder of the Aruba Police Force.
- Noel Punton, 85, Australian Olympic gymnast.
- Jorge Schiaffino Isunza, 70, Mexican politician, member of the Chamber of Deputies (1988–1991).
- Sir Hereward Wake, 14th Baronet, 101, British army officer.
- John P. Yates, 96, American politician, member of the Georgia House of Representatives (1989–1990, 1993–2016).

=== 12 ===
- Juan Ramón Aguirre Lanari, 97, Argentine lawyer and politician, Minister of Foreign Affairs (1982–1983).
- Juan Manuel Bayón, 91, Argentine military officer, Governor of Misiones Province (1981–1983).
- Floro Bogado, 78, Argentine politician, lawyer and diplomat, Governor of Formosa Province (1983–1987).
- Ken Bracey, 80, American baseball player (Springfield Giants).
- Patrizia Casagrande Esposto, 66, Italian politician, President of the Province of Ancona (2007–2014).
- Michael Clendenin, 83, American newspaper editor (New York Daily News) and reporter, winner of Pulitzer Prize (1974).
- Pat DiNizio, 62, American singer and musician (The Smithereens).
- Peter Duffell, 95, British film and TV director (The House That Dripped Blood, England Made Me, Inside Out).
- Jane Galletly, 89, British-born New Zealand TV scriptwriter and editor (Close to Home, EastEnders, The Sullivans).
- Joseph Gargan, 87, American lawyer.
- Marvin Greenberg, 81, American mathematician.
- Bob Hale, 72, British philosopher.
- Alessandro Kokocinski, 69, Italian-Argentine artist and set designer.
- Ed Lee, 65, American politician, Mayor of San Francisco (since 2011), heart attack.
- Lewis Manilow, 90, American lawyer and philanthropist, Alzheimer's disease.
- Pat O'Rawe, Irish politician, MLA for Newry Armagh (2003–2007).
- Alphonsus Liguori Penney, 93, Canadian Roman Catholic prelate, Bishop of Grand Falls (1972–1979) and Archbishop of St. John's (1979–1991).
- Willie Pickens, 86, American jazz pianist (Eddie Harris, Elvin Jones) and educator (American Conservatory of Music).
- Tom Reese, 89, American actor (Ellery Queen, North Dallas Forty, The Greatest Story Ever Told).
- Anthony Scaduto, 85, American journalist and biographer.
- Ethel Simpson, 91, Scottish journalist (The Press and Journal).
- Harry Sparnaay, 73, Dutch bass clarinetist.
- Aharon Yehuda Leib Shteinman, 104, Israeli Haredi rabbi.
- Wang Qun, 91, Chinese politician, Communist Party Secretary of Inner Mongolia (1987–1994).

=== 13 ===
- Mustafa Akgül, 69, Turkish computer scientist.
- Pavel Ardzinba, 56, Abkhazian-Georgian businessman and criminal, shot.
- Yurizan Beltran, 31, American pornographic actress, drug overdose.
- Li Bude, 98, Chinese military officer and politician.
- Theodore Cohen, 88, American organic chemist.
- Warrel Dane, 56, American rock singer (Sanctuary, Nevermore), heart attack.
- Laurence de Grandhomme, 61, Zimbabwean cricketer.
- John DeLamater, 77, American social psychologist and sexologist.
- Simon Dickie, 66, New Zealand rowing coxswain, Olympic champion (1968, 1972), fall from balcony.
- John Joseph Gerry, 90, Australian Roman Catholic prelate, Auxiliary Bishop of Brisbane (1975–2003).
- Fred Grambau, 67, American football player (Hamilton Tiger-Cats).
- Bruce Gray, 81, Puerto Rican-born Canadian actor (Traders, My Big Fat Greek Wedding, Crimson Peak), brain cancer.
- Vanessa Greene, 63, British-American television producer (Deadly Desire, Our Son, the Matchmaker) and writer (Star Trek: The Next Generation), breast cancer.
- André Haddad, 87, Lebanese Melkite Catholic hierarch, Archbishop of Zahle and Forzol (1983–2010).
- Bette Howland, 80, American writer.
- Bill Hudson, 82, American football player (Montreal Alouettes, San Diego Chargers).
- Dan Johnson, 57, American politician, member of the Kentucky House of Representatives (since 2017), suicide by gunshot.
- Frank Lary, 87, American baseball player (Detroit Tigers, New York Mets), pneumonia.
- Tommy Nobis, 74, American football player (Atlanta Falcons).
- Gerald O'Brien, 93, New Zealand politician, MP for Island Bay (1969–1978).
- Rory O'Donoghue, 68, Australian musician and actor (The Aunty Jack Show), suicide.
- Martin Ransohoff, 90, American film and television producer (The Beverly Hillbillies, Mister Ed, The Cincinnati Kid), co-founder of Filmways.
- Martti Rautio, 82, Finnish-born Canadian Olympic cross-country skier.
- Eti Saaga, 67, Samoan-born American Samoan poet and writer.
- Barry Sherman, 75, Canadian billionaire drug manufacturer, CEO and founder of Apotex, ligature neck compression.
- Elżbieta Trylińska, 57, Polish Olympic high jumper (1980).
- Paul Yesawich, 94, American basketball player (Syracuse Nationals) and judge.
- Charles Zentai, 96, Hungarian-born Australian alleged Holocaust perpetrator.

=== 14 ===
- Bob Claver, 89, American television producer (The Partridge Family, Ensign O'Toole) and director (Mork & Mindy).
- Charles Cogan, 89, American CIA agent and academic.
- Ákos Császár, 93, Hungarian mathematician.
- Hubert Damisch, 89, French philosopher.
- Bob Givens, 99, American animator (Looney Tunes, Tom and Jerry, Garfield and Friends).
- Tom Hall, 77, American football player (Minnesota Vikings, Detroit Lions).
- John Hickey, 62, Canadian politician, shot.
- Michael Hirst, 84, British art historian.
- Bob Jarvis, 82, Canadian politician.
- Otto Kaiser, 92, German biblical scholar.
- Wayne Kendell, 92, American politician.
- Louis-Paul Neveu, 86, Canadian politician.
- Karl-Erik Nilsson, 95, Swedish wrestler, Olympic champion (1948).
- Tamio Ōki, 89, Japanese voice actor (Ghost in the Shell, Astro Boy, JoJo's Bizarre Adventure).
- Charles Byron Renfrew, 89, American federal judge, U.S. District Court for the Northern District of California (1971–1980).
- R. C. Sproul, 78, American theologian, author, and pastor, founder of Ligonier Ministries, complications from COPD.
- Page Stegner, 80, American novelist, essayist, and historian.
- Marc Van Eeghem, 57, Belgian actor (The van Paemel Family), cancer.
- Antanas Vaupšas, 81, Lithuanian Soviet Olympic athlete (1964).
- Neeraj Vora, 54, Indian actor, screenwriter and director (Khiladi 420, Mela, Phir Hera Pheri), complications from a stroke and heart attack.
- Marilyn Ware, 74, American diplomat and businesswoman, Ambassador to Finland (2006–2008), complications from Alzheimer's disease.
- Lones Wigger, 80, American sports shooter, Olympic champion (1964, 1972), pancreatic cancer.
- Ye Zhengda, 90, Chinese politician.
- Yu Kwang-chung, 89, Taiwanese poet.

=== 15 ===
- Arthur S. Abramson, 92, American linguist.
- Maureen Adams, 80, Australian Olympic archer.
- Dave Boyd, 90, Australian footballer (Port Adelaide).
- Don Hogan Charles, 79, American photographer.
- A. B. M. Mohiuddin Chowdhury, 73, Bangladeshi politician, mayor of Chittagong City Corporation (1994–2009).
- John Critchinson, 82, English jazz pianist.
- Darlanne Fluegel, 64, American actress (To Live and Die in L.A., Once Upon a Time in America, Running Scared), Alzheimer's disease.
- Kjell Grede, 81, Swedish director (Good Evening, Mr. Wallenberg, Hugo and Josephine), chronic obstructive pulmonary disease.
- Michael Hartshorn, 81, British-born New Zealand organic chemist.
- Pierre Hohenberg, 83, French-American theoretical physicist.
- Tony Hunt Sr., 75, Canadian artist.
- Gidado Idris, 82, Nigerian civil servant.
- Calestous Juma, 64, Kenyan scientist.
- Erling Linde Larsen, 86, Danish footballer.
- Michael McGuire, 87, American actor (Cheers, That Championship Season, Empire).
- Felipe Mesones, 81, Argentine football player (Real Murcia, Hospitalet) and coach.
- Neville Moray, 82, British psychologist.
- George Yod Phimphisan, 84, Thai Roman Catholic prelate, Bishop of Udon Thani (1975–2009).
- Kazimierz Piechowski, 98, Polish political prisoner and Holocaust survivor.
- Ernest John Revell, 83, Scottish-born Canadian scholar.
- Michiru Shimada, 58, Japanese anime screenwriter (Dr. Slump, Little Witch Academia, One Piece).
- Rubén Pato Soria, 75, Mexican professional wrestler.
- Bunty Thompson, 92, Australian Olympic equestrian rider.
- Freddy Van Gaever, 79, Belgian politician and airline executive (DAT, VLM Airlines), Senator (2007–2011), cancer.
- Heinz Wolff, 89, German-born British scientist and television presenter (The Great Egg Race), heart failure.

=== 16 ===
- Ed Bordley, 61, American Paralympic champion wrestler and attorney, complications from thymus cancer.
- Ralph Carney, 61, American saxophonist (Tin Huey, Tom Waits) and composer (BoJack Horseman), head injuries from fall.
- Len Ceglarski, 91, American college ice hockey coach (Clarkson, Boston College) and player, Olympic silver medalist (1952).
- John Clibborn, 76, British spy.
- Richard Dobson, 75, American country singer-songwriter.
- Reinhart Fuchs, 83, German chess player.
- Mohammad Sayedul Haque, 75, Bangladeshi politician, Minister of Fisheries and Livestock (since 2014).
- E. Hunter Harrison, 73, American transportation executive, CEO of CSX Corporation (since 2017), Canadian National Railway (2003–2009) and Canadian Pacific Railway (2009–2017).
- Hilda Hernández, 51, Honduran agronomist and politician, helicopter crash.
- Angela Kokkola, 85, Greek politician, MEP (1994–1999).
- Sharon Laws, 43, British racing cyclist, cervical cancer.
- Andrew McCutcheon, 86, Australian politician, Attorney-General of Victoria (1987–1990).
- Grassella Oliphant, 88, American jazz drummer.
- Jean-Michel Parasiliti di Para, 75, French royal, pretender to the throne of the Kingdom of Araucanía and Patagonia.
- Michael Prophet, 60, Jamaican reggae singer, cardiac arrest.
- Keely Smith, 89, American singer ("That Old Black Magic", "I've Got You Under My Skin", "Bei Mir Bist Du Schoen"), Grammy winner (1959), heart failure.
- Song Sin-do, 95, Korean former comfort woman.
- Eva Koves Stubbs, 92, Hungarian-born Canadian artist.
- Tu An, 94, Chinese poet and translator.
- Robert G. Wilmers, 83, American billionaire banker, CEO of M&T Bank (since 1983).
- Z'EV, 66, American percussionist and poet, pulmonary failure.

=== 17 ===
- H. K. Brown Jr., 79, American football coach.
- Castletown, 31, New Zealand racehorse, heart attack.
- Terry Cavanagh, 91, Canadian politician, Mayor of Edmonton (1975–1977).
- Pat Devery, 95, Australian rugby league player (Huddersfield, national team) and coach (Manly Warringah).
- Robert Elrod, 91, American politician.
- Mohamed Eshtewi, Libyan politician, mayor of Misurata, shot.
- Johnny Fox, 64, American sword swallower, liver cancer.
- Doug Gallagher, 77, American baseball player (Detroit Tigers).
- Higinio García, 61, Spanish footballer (Recreativo de Huelva, Villarreal, Orihuela).
- Bob Glidden, 73, American Hall of Fame drag racer (NHRA).
- Frank Hodgkin, 76, Australian footballer (St Kilda).
- Al Kelley, 82, American golfer.
- Francesco Leonetti, 93, Italian writer and poet.
- Kevin Mahogany, 59, American jazz singer, heart attack.
- Bennett Malone, 73, American politician, member of the Mississippi House of Representatives (1979–2015).
- Georgy Natanson, 96, Russian director, screenwriter and playwright.
- Edward Rowny, 100, American army lieutenant general and presidential military advisor.
- Marjorie Schick, 76, American jewelry artist and academic, complications from a stroke.
- Edmon Shehadeh, 84, Palestinian poet.

=== 18 ===
- Janet Benshoof, 70, American reproductive rights activist and lawyer, founder of the Center for Reproductive Rights, uterine serous carcinoma.
- Drew Von Bergen, 77, American journalist (United Press International) and communications specialist, President of the National Press Club (1980).
- Barry Cohen, 82, Australian politician, MP (1969–1990), Alzheimer's disease.
- William O. Harbach, 98, American television producer and director (The Steve Allen Show).
- Larry Harris, 70, American record label executive (Casablanca Records), abdominal aneurysm.
- Wolf C. Hartwig, 98, German film producer (Schulmädchen-Report, Cross of Iron).
- Åke Hellman, 102, Finnish artist.
- David Huntley, 60, Canadian lacrosse player (Philadelphia Wings) and coach (Atlanta Blaze).
- LeRoy Jolley, 80, American racehorse trainer, lung cancer.
- Kim Jong-hyun, 27, South Korean singer-songwriter (Shinee) and radio host, apparent suicide by carbon monoxide poisoning.
- Johan C. Løken, 73, Norwegian politician, MP (1981–1993), Minister of Agriculture (1981–1983).
- Fritz Lustig, 98, German-born British army intelligence officer.
- Altero Matteoli, 77, Italian politician, Minister of Infrastructure and Transport (2008–2011), traffic collision.
- Ricardo Miledi, 90, Mexican neuroscientist.
- Georges Othily, 73, French Guianese politician, Senator (1989–2008).
- Josef Pešice, 67, Czech football player and manager (AC Sparta Prague, SK Slavia Prague).
- Manuel Roa, 88, Chilean Olympic footballer.
- Arseny Roginsky, 71, Russian dissident and historian, co-founder and chairman of Memorial.
- Ana Enriqueta Terán, 99, Venezuelan poet.
- Yves Trudeau, 87, Canadian sculptor, heart attack.
- Radoslav Večerka, 89, Czech linguist.
- Hannelore Weygand, 93, German equestrian, Olympic silver medallist (1956).

=== 19 ===
- Vasilena Amzina, 75, Bulgarian Olympic athlete.
- Juan Bucetta, 90, Uruguayan Olympic water polo player.
- Lito Cruz, 76, Argentine director and actor.
- Thérèse DePrez, 52, American production designer (Black Swan, High Fidelity, Stoker), breast cancer.
- Célestin Gaombalet, 75, Central African politician, Prime Minister (2003–2005).
- Clifford Irving, 87, American author and convicted fraudster, subject of The Hoax and F for Fake, pancreatic cancer.
- E. Louis Johnson, 80, American politician.
- Mamie Johnson, 82, American baseball player (Indianapolis Clowns).
- Yevhen Kotelnykov, 78, Ukrainian football player and coach.
- Hiep Thi Le, 46, Vietnamese-American actress (Heaven & Earth, Cruel Intentions, Lakeview Terrace) and restaurateur, stomach cancer.
- Ruth Jones McClendon, 74, American politician, member of the Texas House of Representatives (1996–2016), cancer.
- Noel McLoughlin, 88, Australian Olympic ice hockey player.
- Andy Miyamoto, 84, American-Japanese baseball player (Yomiuri Giants, Kokutetsu Swallows).
- Jerry A. Moore Jr., 99, American politician, member of the Council of the District of Columbia (1975–1985).
- Édith Mourier, 96, French mathematician, specialising in probability theory
- Frank North, 92, American football coach (Marion Military Institute, West Alabama).
- Jon Oberlander, 55, British cognitive scientist.
- Fred H. Roster, 73, American sculptor.
- Jack Schroeder, 92, American politician.
- Sir Peter Terry, 91, British air force commander and politician, Governor of Gibraltar (1985–1989).
- Tong Zhipeng, 93, Chinese scientist.
- Richard Venture, 94, American actor (Scent of a Woman, Being There, Courage Under Fire).
- Leo Welch, 85, American blues musician.
- Jeremy Wilkin, 87, English-born Canadian actor (Thunderbirds, Captain Scarlet and the Mysterons, Doctor Who).

=== 20 ===
- William Agee, 79, American business executive, complications from respiratory failure.
- Muhammad Mustafa Al-A'zami, 87, Indian hadith scholar.
- Florence Bjelke-Petersen, 97, Australian politician, Senator (1981–1993).
- Rosa Brítez, 76, Paraguayan potter, complications from lung disease.
- Henryk Cioch, 66, Polish lawyer and politician, Senator (2011–2015).
- Carolyn Cohen, 88, American biologist and biophysicist.
- Combat Jack, 53, American music journalist (The Source, Complex), historian and podcaster, colon cancer.
- Archie Duncan, 91, Scottish historian.
- Jim French, 89, American radio host (Imagination Theatre) and voice actor (Left 4 Dead, Half-Life 2).
- Annie Goetzinger, 66, French comics artist.
- M. B. Goffstein, 77, American writer and illustrator.
- William Grieve, 87-88, American bridge player.
- Jean-Jacques Guyon, 85, French equestrian, Olympic champion (1968).
- Charlie Hennigan, 82, American football player (Houston Oilers).
- Omar Hodge, 75, British Virgin Islands politician, member of the House of Assembly (1979–2011), stroke.
- Keturah Kamugasa, 50, Ugandan fashion journalist and magazine executive.
- Bernard Francis Law, 86, American Roman Catholic cardinal, Archbishop of Boston (1984–2002).
- George Mans, 77, American football player and coach (Michigan Wolverines, Eastern Michigan Eagles) and politician, member of the Michigan House of Representatives (1997–2002).
- Stuart McDonald, 89, Australian politician, member of the Victorian Legislative Council (1967–1979) and federal president of the National Party (1987–1990).
- Stan Pilecki, 70, Polish-born Australian rugby union player (Queensland Reds, national team).
- Randolph Quirk, Baron Quirk, 97, British linguist and life peer.
- Jackie Simpson, 83, American football player (Baltimore Colts, Pittsburgh Steelers).
- Jiří Sloup, 64, Czech footballer (Viktoria Plzeň, Bohemians 1905, national team).
- Diane Straus, 66, American publisher (Washington Monthly) and platform tennis player, cancer.
- Marilyn Tyler, 91, American opera singer.
- David Grant Walker, 94, British historian.
- Kenichi Yamamoto, 95, Japanese engineer, chairman of Mazda Motor Company (1987–1992).

=== 21 ===
- Zdzisław Bieniek, 87, Polish footballer.
- Manouchehr Boroumand, 83, Iranian heavyweight weightlifter, Asian Games champion (1966).
- Dorothy Bryant, 87, American feminist novelist and playwright.
- Ken Catchpole, 78, Australian rugby union player (New South Wales Waratahs, national team).
- Dick Enberg, 82, American sportscaster (NFL on NBC, Major League Baseball on NBC, San Diego Padres), heart attack.
- March Fong Eu, 95, American politician, California Secretary of State (1975–1994) and member of the State Assembly (1967–1974), Ambassador to Micronesia, complications from surgery.
- Dominic Frontiere, 86, American composer (The Outer Limits, Hang 'Em High, The Flying Nun).
- Sietze Haarsma, 91, Dutch Olympic rower.
- Trevor Hutton, 94, New Zealand flute maker.
- Chu Ishikawa, 51, Japanese composer (Tetsuo: The Iron Man).
- Halvard Kausland, 72, Norwegian jazz guitarist, cancer.
- Jean-Pierre Lehmann, 72, Swiss economist.
- D. Bruce MacPherson, 77, American Episcopal prelate, Bishop of Western Louisiana.
- Bruce McCandless II, 80, American astronaut (STS-41-B).
- Bob Moses, 77, Australian rugby league player (South Sydney, Manly).
- William New Jr., 75, American bioengineer and electrical engineer.
- Francelino Pereira, 96, Brazilian politician, Senator (1995–2003), Governor of Minas Gerais (1979–1983), and Deputy (1963–1979).
- Renanzinho, 20, Brazilian footballer (Avaí), brain cancer.
- Nicholas Rayner, 79, British army officer and auctioneer.
- June Rowlands, 93, Canadian politician, Mayor of Toronto (1991–1994).
- Roswell Rudd, 82, American jazz trombonist, cancer.
- John Sterland, 89, Canadian-born British actor (Performance, Ragtime, Batman).
- Mona Sulaiman, 75, Filipino Olympic sprinter (1960, 1964), Asian Games champion (1962).
- John Vear, 79, New Zealand cricketer.
- Mary Wixey, 96, British track and field athlete.
- Jerry Yellin, 93, American fighter pilot (World War II), lung cancer.
- Yicheng, 90, Chinese monk.

=== 22 ===
- Lou Adler, 88, American radio journalist (WCBS), Alzheimer's disease.
- Gerhard Andlinger, 86, Austrian-born American executive.
- Pervis Atkins, 82, American football player (Los Angeles Rams, Washington Redskins, Oakland Raiders).
- Cyril Beavon, 80, English footballer (Oxford United).
- Hal Bedsole, 76, American football player (Minnesota Vikings).
- Enid Bennett, 86, Jamaican politician.
- Lois Bourne, 89, English Wiccan writer.
- Viola Davis Brown, 81, American nurse.
- Domenic Cretara, 71, American painter.
- Haydn Davies, 82, Welsh rugby union player.
- Stelio De Carolis, 80, Italian politician, Deputy (1987–1994) and Senator (1996–2001), traffic collision.
- Lila-Gene George, 99, American composer and pianist.
- Gerald B. Greenberg, 81, American film editor (The French Connection, Apocalypse Now, Scarface), Oscar winner (1972).
- Ken Hands, 91, Australian footballer (Carlton).
- Banwari Lal Joshi, 81, Indian politician, Governor of Uttarakhand (2007–2009) and Uttar Pradesh (2009–2014), septic shock.
- Leon Kamin, 89, American psychologist.
- Jason Lowndes, 23, Australian racing cyclist, traffic collision.
- Eric Moonman, 88, British politician, MP for Billericay (1966–1970) and Basildon (1974–1979), chairman of the Zionist Federation (1975–1980).
- Gonzalo Morales Sáurez, 72, Costa Rican painter, heart attack.
- Wang Panyuan, 109, Taiwanese painter, multiple organ failure.
- Joseph F. Timilty, 79, American politician, member of the Massachusetts Senate (1972–1985), cancer.

=== 23 ===
- John Atkinson, 71, English rugby league player (Leeds Rhinos, national team), dementia.
- Ray Bandar, 90, American biologist and skull collector, heart failure.
- Jeannette Clift George, 92, American actress (The Hiding Place).
- William G. Curlin, 90, American Roman Catholic prelate, Bishop of Charlotte (1994–2002), cancer.
- Angelo Dagres, 83, American baseball player (Baltimore Orioles).
- Maurice Hayes, 90, Irish politician, Senator (1996–2006).
- Volli Kalm, 64, Estonian geologist, rector of the University of Tartu (2012–2017).
- James Ligo, Ni-Vanuatu Anglican prelate, Bishop of Vanuatu and New Caledonia (since 2006).
- Héctor Morera Vega, 91, Costa Rican Roman Catholic prelate, Bishop of Tilarán (1979–2002).
- Senta Raizen, 93, Austrian-born American scientist and educator.
- Neftalí Rivera, 69, Puerto Rican Olympic basketball player (1972, 1976), respiratory problems.
- Arto Sipinen, 81, Finnish architect.
- Thomas Stanford, 93, German-born American film editor (West Side Story, Jeremiah Johnson, Hell in the Pacific), Oscar winner (1962).
- Karel Štefl, 71, Czech Olympic cross-country skier.
- Stuart Wenham, 60, Australian engineer, melanoma.
- Mark Whittow, 60, British archaeologist and Byzantinist, traffic collision.

=== 24 ===
- Lynne Rudder Baker, 73, American philosopher, heart disease.
- Ken Davies, 92, American painter.
- Thomas P. Griesa, 87, American judge, member of the U.S. District Court for Southern New York (since 1972).
- Mietek Grocher, 91, Polish-born Swedish writer.
- Don Hahnfeldt, 73, American politician, member of the Florida House of Representatives (since 2016), cancer.
- Don Hall, 87, Canadian ice hockey player (Johnstown Jets, Rochester Americans, Toledo Mercurys).
- Mathew Hintz, 41, American painter.
- Jimmie C. Holland, 89, American medical researcher.
- Brian Jenkins, 74, British Olympic swimmer (1964), European championship silver medalist (1962), heart disease.
- Allan G. Johnson, 71, American writer and public speaker.
- Jerry Kindall, 82, American baseball player (Chicago Cubs, Cleveland Indians) and coach (Arizona Wildcats), stroke.
- Mária Littomeritzky, 90, Hungarian swimmer, Olympic champion (1952).
- Heather Menzies, 68, Canadian-born American actress (The Sound of Music, Logan's Run, Piranha), brain cancer.
- Sir Brian Neill, 94, British judge, Lord Justice of Appeal (1985–1996), President of Court of Appeal for Gibraltar (1998–2003).
- Dick Orkin, 84, American voice actor and radio personality (Chickenman), stroke.
- Marcus Raskin, 83, American author and idealist.
- Robert H. Reed, 88, American air force general.
- Carlos Stohr, 86, Czech-born Venezuelan painter.
- Andrey Zaliznyak, 82, Russian linguist.

=== 25 ===
- Michael Britt, 57, American basketball player.
- Ray Brown, 81, American football player (Baltimore Colts), NFL champion (1958, 1959).
- Antonio Camacho García, 91, Spanish politician, Mayor of Granada (1979).
- Ken Feltscheer, 102, Australian footballer (Hawthorn, Melbourne).
- Claude Haldi, 75, Swiss racing driver.
- Francess Halpenny, 98, Canadian editor (Dictionary of Canadian Biography).
- Oliver Ibielski, 46, German rower.
- Maura Jacobson, 91, American crossword puzzle constructor.
- Stanisław Kędziora, 83, Polish Roman Catholic prelate, Auxiliary Bishop of Warsaw (1987–1992) and Warszawa-Praga (1992–2011).
- Erich Kellerhals, 78, German entrepreneur (MediaMarkt).
- Larry Libertore, 78, American football player (Florida Gators) and politician, member of the Florida House of Representatives (1970–1974).
- D. Herbert Lipson, 88, American magazine publisher.
- Sergio Magaña Martínez, 68, Mexican politician, Senator (1994–2000), mayor of Morelia (1993–1994).
- Renato Marchiaro, 98, Italian footballer.
- Vladimir Shainsky, 92, Ukrainian-born Russian composer (Cheburashka, Finist, the brave Falcon).
- Willie Toweel, 83, South African flyweight boxer, Olympic bronze medalist (1952).
- Samin Uygun, 77–78, Turkish footballer.

=== 26 ===
- Shahnon Ahmad, 84, Malaysian writer and politician, MP (1999–2004).
- Dick Allen, 78, American poet, heart attack.
- Orsten Artis, 74, American basketball player (Texas Western Miners).
- Johnny Bower, 93, Canadian ice hockey player (Toronto Maple Leafs, New York Rangers), pneumonia.
- Jim Burns, 65, American television executive, co-creator of MTV Unplugged, traffic collision.
- Gerd Cintl, 79, German rower, Olympic champion (1960).
- Kenneth Clayton, 79, American chess master.
- Ed Diachuk, 81, Canadian ice hockey player (Detroit Red Wings).
- Joseph Gantman, 95, American television producer (Mission: Impossible, Voyage to the Bottom of the Sea, The Dukes of Hazzard).
- Devendra Prasad Gupta, 84, Indian botanist and academician, vice-chancellor of the Ranchi University, pneumonia.
- Gerd Hennig, 82, German football referee.
- Asa Lanova, 84, Swiss dancer (Danseuse Étoile) and author.
- Tuija Lindström, 67, Finnish-born Swedish photographer.
- Gualtiero Marchesi, 87, Italian chef and restaurateur, cancer.
- Willie Penman, 78, Scottish footballer (Newcastle United, Swindon Town, Walsall).
- Steve Piper, 64, English footballer (Brighton and Hove Albion, Portsmouth).
- Shang Chuan, 72, Chinese historian (Ming dynasty).
- Francis Walmsley, 91, English Roman Catholic prelate, Bishop of the Forces (1979–2002).
- Irv Weinstein, 87, American broadcaster and television news anchor (WKBW), amyotrophic lateral sclerosis.

=== 27 ===
- Ben Barres, 63, American neurobiologist, pancreatic cancer.
- Fernando Birri, 92, Argentine filmmaker.
- Robert A. Bryan, 91, American professor.
- Amanda Davis, 62, American journalist and news anchor (WRET/WPCQ, SNC, WAGA, WGCL), complications from a stroke.
- James Dolan, 36, American computer security expert, co-developer of SecureDrop, suicide.
- Osvaldo Fattori, 95, Italian footballer (Inter Milan, national team).
- Bernard Gordon Lennox, 85, British army general.
- Thomas Hunter, 85, American actor (The Hills Run Red, Death Walks in Laredo, The Magnificent Tony Carrera).
- Larry McGuinness, 97, Canadian Olympic equestrian.
- Ken Poulsen, 70, American baseball player (Boston Red Sox).
- Lothar Schämer, 77, German footballer (Eintracht Frankfurt).
- Curly Seckler, 98, American bluegrass musician (Foggy Mountain Boys, Nashville Grass).
- Daljit Singh, 83, Indian eye surgeon.
- Colin Tench, 63, English musician.
- Jack Van Berg, 81, American horse trainer (Alysheba, Gate Dancer).
- John Wilkin, 93, Australian cricketer.
- Nun Zairina, 85, Indonesian dancer.

=== 28 ===
- Bronwen Astor, Viscountess Astor, 87, British model, psychotherapist and society figure.
- Ron Baensch, 78, Australian Olympic cyclist.
- Giulio Einaudi, 89, Italian Roman Catholic prelate and Vatican diplomat, Apostolic Nuncio (1976–2003).
- Rubens Augusto de Souza Espínola, 89, Brazilian Roman Catholic prelate, Bishop of Paranavaí (1985–2003).
- John Faulkner, 69, English footballer (Luton Town, Memphis Rogues, California Surf).
- Sue Grafton, 77, American author ("B" Is for Burglar, Keziah Dane, The Lolly-Madonna War), cancer.
- Normand Grimard, 92, Canadian lawyer and politician.
- Jean-François Hory, 68, French politician, MP (1981–1986), MEP (1989–1999), president of the PRG (1992–1996), cancer.
- Al Luplow, 78, American baseball player (Cleveland Indians, New York Mets, Pittsburgh Pirates).
- Rose Marie, 94, American actress (The Dick Van Dyke Show, The Hollywood Squares, The Doris Day Show).
- Robert T. Marsh, 92, American air force general.
- Juan Masferrer, 77, Chilean politician, Deputy (1990–2010).
- Ronit Matalon, 58, Israeli novelist and social activist, cancer.
- Melton Mustafa, 70, American jazz musician and educator, prostate cancer.
- Helen Nibouar, 96, American cryptographer.
- Nichols Canyon, 7, British-bred Irish-trained racehorse, euthanized after race fall.
- Mariam Nabieva, 80, Tajik First Lady (1991–1992), injuries from a fire.
- Barry Paw, 55, Burmese-born American biologist.
- Recy Taylor, 97, American kidnapping victim and activist.
- Stanisław Terlecki, 62, Polish footballer.
- Mamoudou Touré, 89, Senegalese economist and politician, Minister of Finance (1983–1988).
- Ulrich Wegener, 88, German police officer, founder of GSG9, led raid to end hijack of Lufthansa Flight 181.
- Francis Wyndham, 93, British author, literary editor and journalist.

=== 29 ===
- Hoshang Amroliwala, 86, Indian cricketer.
- Jim Baikie, 77, British comic book artist (Judge Dredd, Skizz, Jinty).
- Danny Breen, 67, American actor (Not Necessarily the News), comedian (The Second City) and producer (Whose Line Is It Anyway?), cancer.
- John Carter, 84, Canadian politician, MHA for St. John's North (1971–1989).
- Vicente Rodrigo Cisneros Durán, 83, Ecuadorian Roman Catholic prelate, Bishop of Ambato (1969–2000) and Archbishop of Cuenca (2000–2009).
- Clyde Cumberbatch, 81, Trinidadian cricket umpire.
- Peggy Cummins, 92, Welsh-born Irish actress (Gun Crazy), stroke.
- Art Dorrington, 87, Canadian ice hockey player (Johnstown Jets).
- Odd Fossengen, 72, Norwegian speedway rider (Poole Pirates), complications from a heart attack.
- Carmen Franco, 1st Duchess of Franco, 91, Spanish noble, cancer.
- Erhard Heinz, 93, German mathematician.
- Guy Joron, 77, Canadian politician, MNA for Gouin (1970–1973) and Mille-Îles (1976–1981).
- José Louzeiro, 85, Brazilian novelist and screenwriter.
- Luigi R. Marano, 96, American politician.
- John C. Portman Jr., 93, American architect (Peachtree Center, Shanghai Centre, Tomorrow Square).
- William V. Spanos, 92, American literary critic.
- Lawrence Stager, 74, American archaeologist, fall.

=== 30 ===
- Harold Balazs, 89, American sculptor.
- Dovie Beams, 85, American actress (Guns of a Stranger).
- Alan Bleviss, 76, Canadian voice actor, lung cancer.
- Chummy Broomhall, 98, American cross country skier.
- Robert N. Clayton, 87, Canadian chemist.
- Prince François, Count of Clermont, 56, French royal, styled Dauphin of France.
- Erica Garner, 27, American civil rights activist, heart attack.
- Stan Knowles, 86, Australian politician, member of the New South Wales Legislative Assembly (1981–1990).
- Bill Lishman, 78, Canadian sculptor and inventor.
- Sunanda Murali Manohar, 60, Indian film producer, cancer.
- Sean McCaffrey, 58, Irish football manager (national team U-17 and U-19), diabetes and kidney disease.
- Donald Moe, 75, American politician, member of the Minnesota Senate (1981–1990) and House of Representatives (1971–1980), cancer.
- Jackie Mooney, 79–80, Irish footballer (Shamrock Rovers).
- Neville Parsons, 91, Australian physicist.
- Eugene Rogers, 93, American Olympic swimmer.
- Chingiz Sadykhov, 88, Azerbaijani pianist.
- Sanshō Shinsui, 70, Japanese actor, heart failure.
- Jonathan Z. Smith, 79, American historian of religion.
- Dame Cheryll Sotheran, 72, New Zealand museum executive, founding director of Te Papa.
- Bernd Spier, 73, German schlager singer and record producer.
- Gavin Stamp, 69, British architectural historian, prostate cancer.
- Gyöngyi Szalay-Horváth, 49, Hungarian fencer, Olympic bronze medalist (1996).
- Tsuneo Tamagawa, 92, Japanese mathematician.
- Tatsuro Toyoda, 88, Japanese car executive, pneumonia.
- Joan E. Walsh, 85, British mathematician.
- Khalid Shameem Wynne, 64, Pakistani military officer, Chairman Joint Chiefs of Staff Committee (2010–2013), traffic collision.

=== 31 ===
- Barbara Balmer, 88, Scottish artist and teacher.
- Trevor Jack Cole, 83, British-Canadian author.
- Richard Cousins, 58, British catering and business support executive, CEO of Compass Group (since 2006), plane crash.
- Clément Fecteau, 84, Canadian Roman Catholic prelate, Bishop of Sainte-Anne-de-la-Pocatière (1996–2008).
- Edward Simons Fulmer, 98, American Army Air Forces officer, recipient of the Military Order of William.
- Richard Havers, 66, British music writer, cancer.
- Auckland Hector, 72, Kittitian cricketer.
- Aravind Joshi, 88, Indian computer scientist.
- Doreen Keogh, 93, Irish actress (Coronation Street, The Royle Family, The Honeymooners).
- Maurice Peress, 87, American conductor and music educator.
- Vinod Raj, 80, Indian actor.
- Charles Alexander Ramsay, 81, British Army officer.
- Philippe Rondot, 81, French general and spy (DST).
- Brian Saffery-Cooper, 83, British Olympic sailor.
- Gale Sherwood, 88, Canadian singer and actress.
- Viola Thompson, 95, American baseball player (AAGPBL).
- Larry Winn, 98, American politician, member of the US House of Representatives (1967–1985) for Kansas's 3rd.
