= Matt Cunningham (musician) =

Irish traditional musician and music teacher)

- Born: Headford, County Galway
- Genres: Irish traditional music Folk
- Occupations: traditional musician, music teacher
- Instruments: accordion, fiddle, tin whistle, vocals
- Years active: 1965-present

Matt Cunningham is a multi-instrumentalist traditional music player and music teacher from Headford, County Galway. He established the Matt Cunningham Céilí Band in 1972. He is known for his contribution to the Irish traditional music and dance landscape, especially céilí music – music for set-dancing. He has recorded over 20 albums.

== Career ==
Matt Cunningham was born in Headford, County Galway, into a family with a strong traditional music background, including his father Joe who played tin whistle and his grandfather William J. Cunningham who played accordion. Traditional music was very well established in his local area of East Galway. He began playing music at an early age and while at secondary school, he played with the Corrib Céilí Band, the O’Neill Brothers Céilí Band and the Keane's Céilí Band. In 1965, after finishing school, he joined the Western Céilí Band and played with them for seven years.

Matt formed the Matt Cunningham Band in 1972. The band members included Gay Cooley (rhythm guitar and vocals), Louis O’Rourke (bass guitar and vocal), and Seamus Sweeney (drums and vocals). The band recorded sessions for Céilí House, a traditional music programme by Radio Teilifis Eireann. Their first international tour was to Boston, USA and Southport, UK, in 1986. The band (sometimes called the Matt Cunningham Céilí Band) have regularly toured internationally since then.

Matt began recording The Dance Music of Ireland series of albums in 1987 with Eugene Kelly. He has recorded over 20 albums in the series, with Eugene Kelly, his children Ita, Joe and Eric, and guests, in order to have the range and variety of music and tunes available for Irish dancing recorded, preserved and available to dancers, music lovers and learners of Irish traditional music. He has also recorded DVDs of Irish set dancing and traditional music, including several volumes of Matt Cunningham's Irish set dancing made easy and Come to the ceili with Matt Cunningham.

In 1984, Matt began teaching Irish traditional music. He teaches accordion, fiddle, tin whistle, keyboard, banjo and mandolin. As well as playing several instruments, Matt Cunningham is a singer, and sings country music. He is also a music composer.

In 2015, a documentary about Matt Cunningham's life, music and impact (Matt Cunningham: Rí na Seite or King of the Set) was made by Red Shoe Productions and shown on TG4, the Irish-language television station. Also in 2015, another documentary on Matt's career and music (Matt Cunningham: Around the House) was broadcast on RTE Irish television. Matt is chairperson of the Headford-Kilcoona branch of Comhaltas Ceoltoiri Eireann. Matt has performed before Pope John Paul II in 1979 at the Papal Visit to Knock, and performed for the Kennedy family.

== Personal life ==
Matt Cunningham is married with four children. His children also play Irish traditional music and have recorded with him. His son Eric is a composer and director of several musical shows including ‘To Dance on the Moon’ and ‘Dance of Desire’. Eric Cunningham and Ita Geraghty founded the Galway Traditional Orchestra.

== Publications ==
- Cunningham, Matt; Taylor, David T. (1999). Matt Cunningham's Dance Music of Ireland. Dublin: Dave Mallinson Publications. ISBN 9781899512454.

== Discography (incomplete) ==
- Dance Music of Ireland Vol. 1–21
- Memories of Ireland
- Every Story Told
- The Green Hills of Erin
- The Spirit of Ireland
- Matt Cunningham - Irish Set Dancing Made Easy, Volume 3 [DVD]
- Matt Cunningham - Irish Set Dancing Made Easy, Volume 2 [DVD]
- Matt Cunningham - Irish Set Dancing Made Easy, Volume 1 [DVD]
- Matt Cunningham and Band Irish Two Hand Dancing [DVD]
- Come To The Ceili [DVD]
