= Shehadeh =

Shehadeh or Shehade is a surname. Notable people with the name include:

- Bassel Shehadeh (1984–2012), Syrian Christian film maker and producer
- Edmon Shehadeh (1933–2017), Palestinian poet
- Kamal Shehadi, Lebanese economist and politician
- Michel Shehadeh (born 1956), executive director of the Arab Film Festival
- Mohammed Shehadeh, civil engineer
- Mtanes Shehadeh (born 1972), Israeli Arab politician
- Raghdan Shehadeh (born 1977), Syrian footballer
- Raja Shehadeh (born 1951), Palestinian lawyer and writer
- Sami Abu Shehadeh, Israeli Arab politician
- Salah Shehade (1953–2002), member of Hamas
