= Clendenin =

Clendenin is a surname. Notable people with the surname include:

- David Clendenin (fl. 1800s–1810s), American investor, soldier, and politician
- David Ramsay Clendenin (1830–1895), American Union Army officer
- John J. Clendenin (1813–1876), justice of the Arkansas Supreme Court
- John L. Clendenin (1934–2020), American businessman
- Michael Clendenin (1934–2017), American journalist
