= Walter Harris (chess player) =

American chess player (1941–2024)

Personal information
- Born: September 28, 1941 Staten Island, New York, U.S.
- Died: October 12, 2024 (aged 83) Arlington, Virginia, U.S.

Chess career
- Country: United States
- Title: National Master (1960)

Walter Harris (September 28, 1941 – October 12, 2024) was an American chess player.

== Life and career ==
Harris was the first African-American chess player to earn the USCF title of National Master. He had a remarkable 5th-place finish in the 1959 U.S. Junior Open. At that tournament, he was unable to rent a room at the tournament's hotel (Sheraton-Fontenelle Hotel) due to racial segregation. Despite his and Anthony Saidy's protests, the hotel managers were adamant, forcing Harris to go to another hotel for accommodations.

Harris, along with Frank Street Jr., Leroy Jackson (Muhammad), and Kenneth Clayton, have been regarded as pioneers of African-Americans in chess in the 1960s.

Harris studied physics at University of California, Los Angeles, and was a career physicist at Lawrence Livermore Laboratory.

Harris died on October 12, 2024, at the age of 83.
