= Frank Street Jr. =

American chess player (born 1943)

Personal information
- Born: 1943 (age 82–83) Washington, D.C.

Chess career
- Country: United States
- Title: National Master
- FIDE rating: 2245 (January 1982)
- Peak rating: 2265 (January 1979)

Frank Street Jr. (born 1943) is an American chess player who won the U.S. Amateur Championship in 1965. He was a member of the Takoma Park Chess Club, a club featuring notable members such as Larry Kaufman and Larry Gilden. In the 1960s, Street Jr was seen as a pioneer for black chess players in the Washington DC area, along with National Masters Walter Harris and Kenneth Clayton.

Street initially received recognition by winning the U.S. Amateur Championship in 1965, which earned him the title of a USCF chess master. the second African-American player in history to achieve the title. For many years thereafter held the highest rating among African-American players. He also defeated Ken Clayton and won the club championship at the Washington Chess Divan, a premier chess club. Street was the second African American chess player to earn the National Master title after Harris. His picture was on the cover of the June 1965 issue of Chess Life magazine.

Frank Street Jr. studied mathematics at University of California, Los Angeles and engineering at University of Maryland, College Park. He had a career in the space and satellite industry at NASA from 1974 to 2008.
