= Barry Paw =

Barry H. Paw
- Born: August 29, 1962
- Died: December 28, 2017 (aged 55)
- Education: David Geffen School of Medicine at UCLA (M.D., 1991)
- Occupation: Biologist

Barry Paw was a Burmese American biologist. He was notable for his role in discovering a new gene in humans that contributes to the production of hemoglobin.

Paw worked in the United States as a researcher at Harvard Medical School and had undertaken research into how the gene mitoferrin transports iron to red blood cells to form hemoglobin. Hemoglobin carries oxygen from the lungs to the rest of the body, including the muscles.

Paw's research was targeted to reveal changes in the genes that cause human diseases, including iron deficiency or those which cause an excessive amount of iron. His research team pioneered the use of zebrafish to model anaemia-causing mutations and more. For example, they were able to identify the molecular basis of Tay-Sachs disease.

Dr. Paw died unexpectedly on December 28, 2017, at the age of 55.
