= Ray Bandar =

Ray Bandar (1927 - 23 December 2017) was a scientist, researcher, teacher, naturalist, and artist living in the San Francisco, California area. He had collected more than 7,000 bone specimens, primarily skulls, from animals across the world, keeping them throughout his home in a collection nicknamed the "Bone Palace". The California Academy of Sciences legally authorized him to gather specimens under its permits, and inherited his collection after his death.

From May–November 2014 the California Academy of Sciences had an exhibit named "Skulls". This exhibit displayed many skulls from the Ray Bandar collection as well as highlighting a bone cleaning technique using flesh eating beetles, and compared bones from various species to learn more about an animals’ history and their evolution and how environmental changes such as pollution and disease have affected them.

He was the subject of the 30-minute documentary, "Ray Bandar: A Life With Skulls" (2006) by filmmaker Beth Cataldo.
