= Jack Felder =

- Born: June 14, 1939; Columbia, South Carolina
- Died: December 3, 2017 (aged 78)
- Education: Masters and Doctorate degree in biochemistry from New York State University
- Occupations: Biochemist, researcher, lecturer, author

Jack Felder (June 14, 1939 – December 3, 2017) was an American biochemist, research, lecturer, activist, educator, historian, and a germ warfare specialist. He was a self published author. He was a United States of America germ warfare specialist from 1962 to 1964 to the 5th Army Regiment in Chicago, Illinois.

Felder lectured about HIV and AIDS being man made.

Felder has written and researched the origins of the Statue of Liberty, and the history of Thanksgiving.

Felder worked for the New York City Public Schools and retired in 2001.

Felder lectured about African American oppression and the origin of HIV/AIDS.

== Early life ==
- He was born in Columbia, South Carolina.
- 1966 to 1970 - He received a Masters and a Doctorate degree in biochemistry from New York State University

== Career ==
- 1964 to 1966 Worked for the Natick Labs near Boston, Massachusetts.
- 1966 to 1970 - He was a research scientist and translator at Siemens Firm in Berlin, Germany.

Self Published Books & Articles

- 1986 - From the Statue of Liberty to the Statue of Bigotry
- 1986 - AIDS–U.S. Germ Warfare at its Best with Documents and Proof
- 1987 - Who Really Assassinated Dr. Martin Luther King"
- 1988 - Who Really Was Behind the Assassination of Malcolm X
- 1990 - Black Origins and Lady Liberty which appeared in the Brooklyn Newspaper the 'Daily Challenge',
- He is also the author of, Should Afrikan People Celebrate Valentine’s Day

== Quotes ==
"I didn't learn that I was Gullah until I got to New York and started studying my true history. I learned that my people, the Gullah, are the Blackest and most pure Africans in America. I knew that when the slave master raped and impregnated our woman with half-caste children, we threw them babies in the Copper River. That's how we stayed so Black.
