= List of papal visits to the Republic of Ireland =

The Republic of Ireland (Ireland) has been visited by a Pope twice:

- Pope John Paul II's visit to Ireland, 1979
- Pope Francis's visit to Ireland, 2018
