= Juan Manuel Bayón =

Argentine military officer (1926–2017)

Governor of Misiones Province
- In office March 31, 1981 – December 11, 1983
- Preceded by: Rubén Norberto Paccagnini
- Succeeded by: Ricardo Barrios Arrechea

Personal details
- Born: November 15, 1926 Buenos Aires, Argentina
- Died: December 12, 2017 (aged 91)

Juan Manuel Bayón (November 15, 1926 – December 12, 2017) was an Argentine military officer, retired brigadier general, and government official during the National Reorganization Process military dictatorship. He held the position of Governor of Misiones Province from March 31, 1981, until December 11, 1983.

Bayón died on December 12, 2017, at the age of 91. He was buried in La Recoleta Cemetery in Buenos Aires on December 14, 2017.
