= Harold Levine =

American mathematician

Harold I. Levine was an American mathematician who was professor at Stanford University. He specialized in wave motion and optics.

Levine was born in New York City. After he graduated from the City College of New York, he earned a Ph.D. in Physics from Cornell University. In 1954, he was awarded a Guggenheim fellowship. Levine died on December 10, 2017, at the age of 95.
