= Maurice Green (virologist) =

American virologist

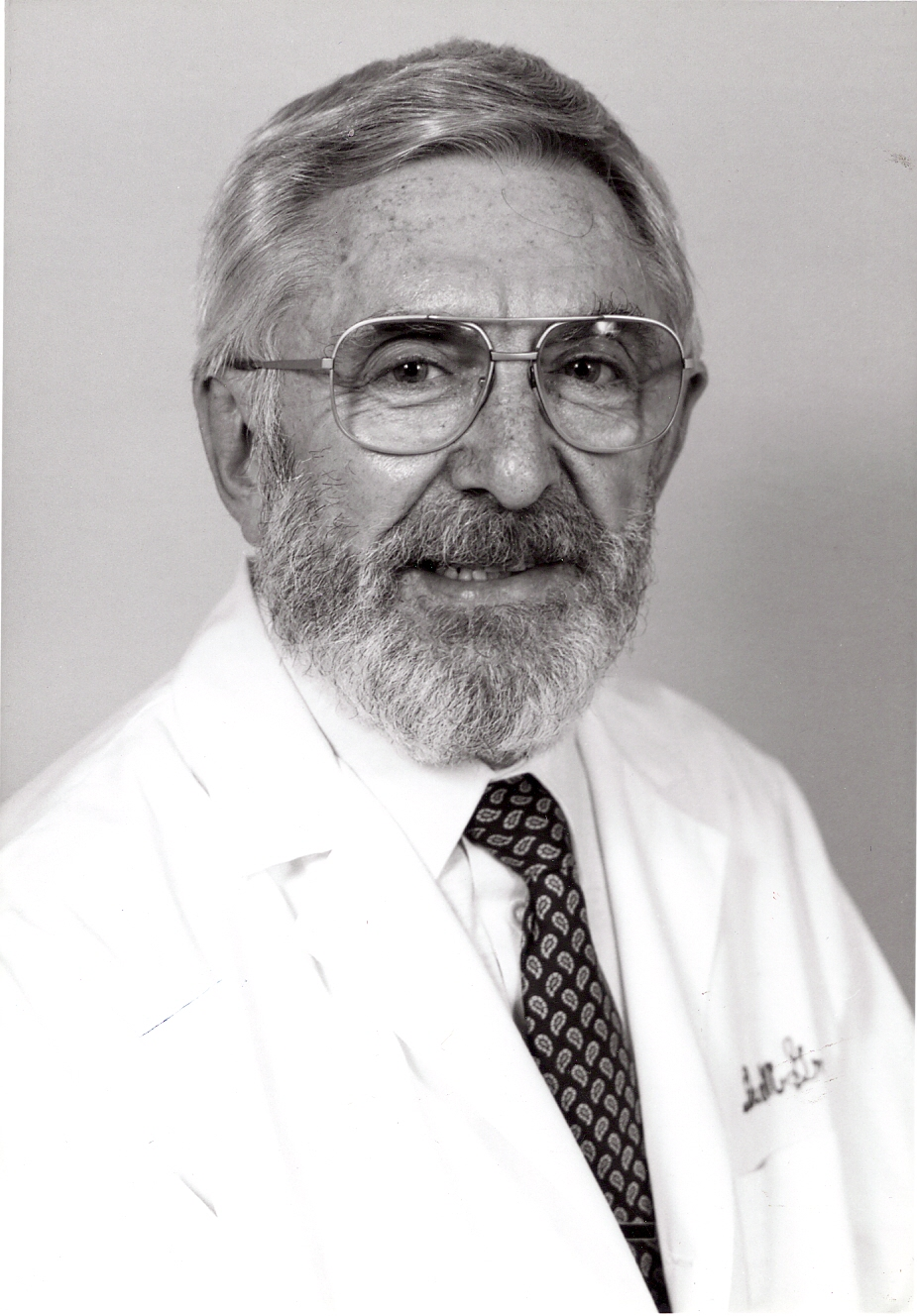
- Maurice Green
- Born: May 5, 1926; New York, New York
- Died: December 5, 2017 (aged 91); St. Louis, Missouri
- Education: University of Wisconsin, Madison (M.S., Ph.D.) University of Michigan, Ann Arbor (B.S.)
- Spouse: Marilyn Glick Green (1929-2010; m. 1950)
- Children: 3
- Awards: NIH R.E. Dyer Lectureship Award 1972 University of Chicago Howard Taylor Ricketts Award 1976 Burroughs-Wellcome Fellow (1986-1987) 1990 American Cancer Society John Krey III Memorial Award American Cancer Society (Heartland Division) Spirit of Health Award 2002 Academy of Science of St. Louis Peter H. Raven Lifetime Award
- Scientific career
- Fields: Virology Microbiology Biochemistry Molecular biology
- Workplaces: St. Louis University School of Medicine
- Website: http://medschool.slu.edu/mmi/index.php?page=maurice-green-ph-d

Maurice Green (May 5, 1926 – December 5, 2017) was an American virologist. He was regarded as a pioneer in the study of animal viruses, in particular their role in cancer. Green founded the Institute of Molecular Virology at St. Louis University School of Medicine in the late 1950s, and later served as its chairman.

== Early life ==
Maurice Green was born on May 5, 1926, in New York, to Jewish parents: David Green, an emigrant from Russia, and Bessie Lipschitz, an emigrant from Lithuania. Green was the oldest of four children.

Following his graduation from high school in 1944, Green served in the U.S. Navy, after which he earned a B.S. degree in chemistry from the University of Michigan, Ann Arbor in 1949. He then received his M.S. (1952) and Ph.D. (1954) degrees in biochemistry and chemistry from the University of Wisconsin, Madison. Afterwards, he pursued postdoctoral research training at the University of Pennsylvania School of Medicine, serving as an instructor of biochemistry from 1955 to 1956.

== Career ==
Green became a faculty member of St. Louis University School of Medicine as an assistant professor in the Department of Microbiology in 1956. He was promoted to associate professor in 1960 and then professor in 1963. In 1964, he became a professor of molecular virology and founding chairman of the Institute for Molecular Virology; he has since held this title and position.

Green was a tumor virologist, with a research career that spanned over 60 years. He played a critical role in developing adenovirus as an experimental system and made many contributions to virology and molecular biology, leading to over 300 authored/co-authored publications and one U.S. patent (No. 61/509,891). He first coined the term molecular virology, and later founded an institute bearing that name. Many of his graduate students and postdoctoral fellows have gone on to make significant contributions to the fields of virology, molecular virology, and tumor biology.

Green's research in the 1960s and early 1970s was highly regarded because of the insights it provided into the role of viruses in cancer.

Green received an NIH lifetime Research Career Award (1969–present), the NIH R.E. Dyer Lectureship Award (1972), and the 1976 University of Chicago Howard Taylor Ricketts Award. He was a Burroughs-Wellcome Fellow (1986–1987) and received the 1990 American Cancer Society John Krey III Memorial Award, The 2002 American Cancer Society (Heartland Division) Spirit of Health Award and the 2002 Academy of Science of St. Louis Peter H. Raven Lifetime Award and Fellow.

== Research ==
Green was one of the founding scientists in the field of tumor virology, an area of biomedical research investigating the role that viruses play in cancer. His early studies were major contributions to the general armamentarium of techniques and concepts used in experimental virology today.

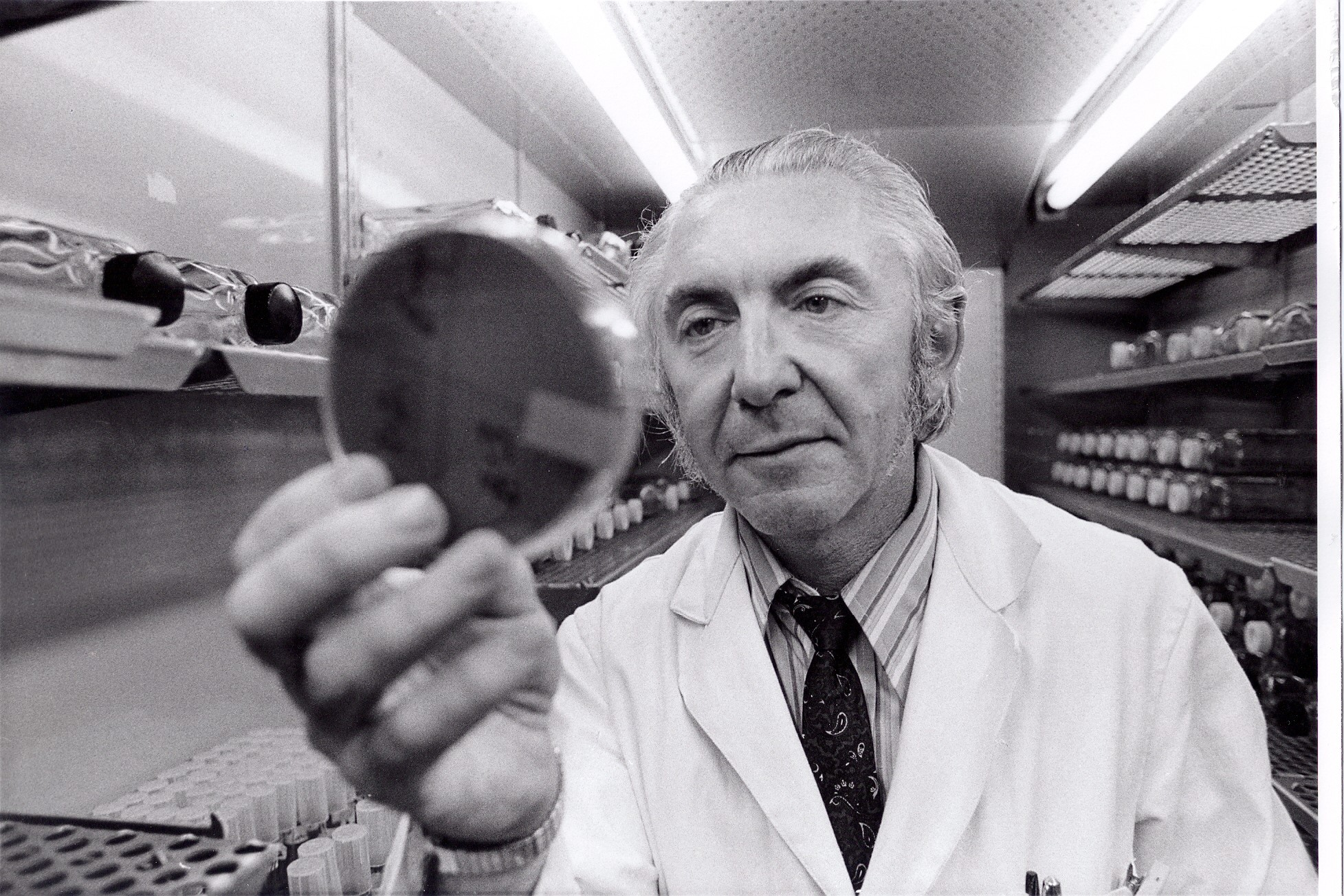
Green conducting virology research.

In the late 1950s and early 1960s, Green was among the first scientists in the world to study biochemical features of virus replication in cell culture and to develop and apply the emerging concepts of molecular biology. His major focus of investigation was human adenoviruses. He and his colleagues performed foundational viral research; growing viruses in culture, purifying virions, extracting and characterizing viral DNA, and studying gene expression at the RNA and protein levels. This work established the kinetics of infection, and showed that the infection was divided into two major stages of gene expression.

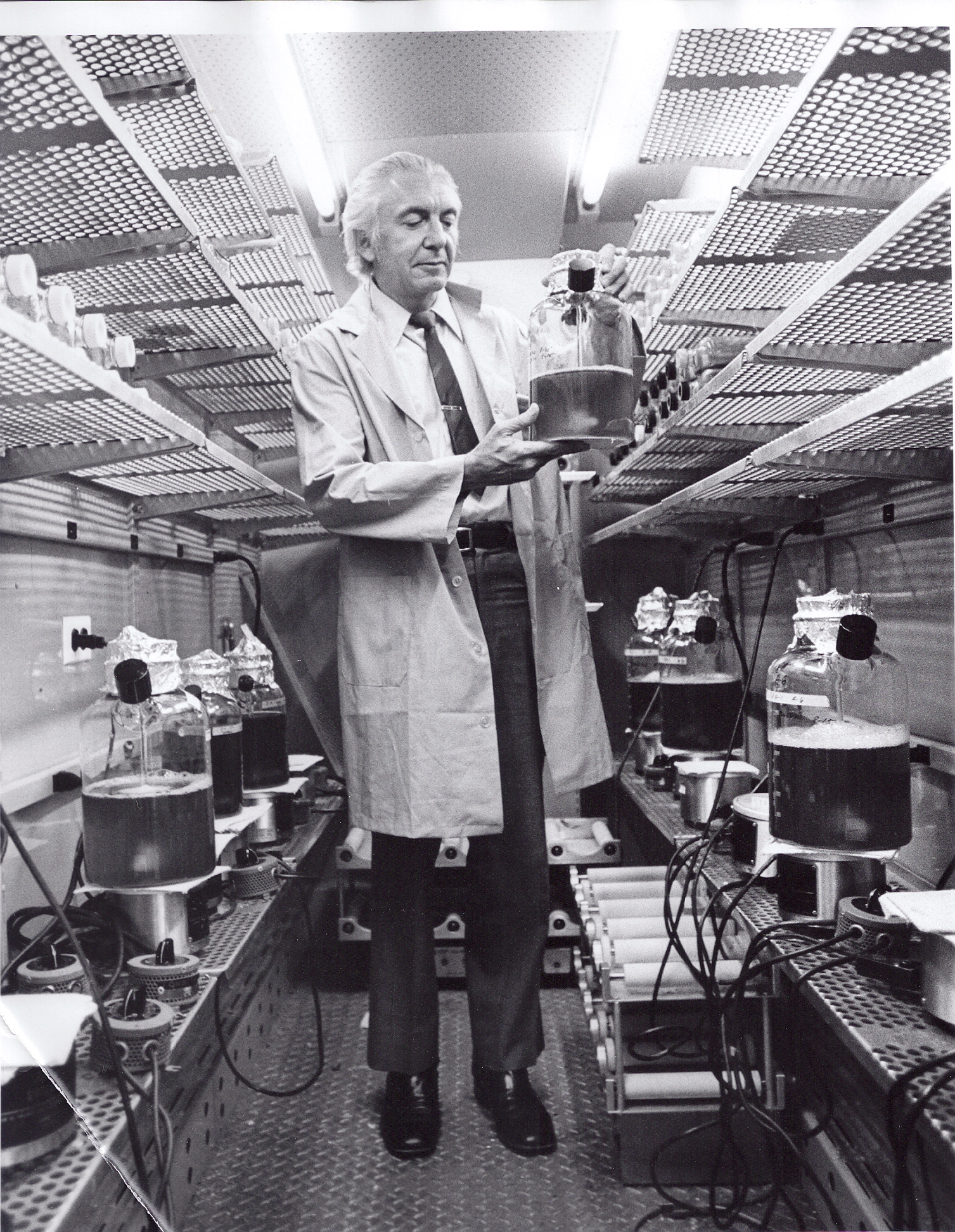
Green culturing virus-infected cells.

In 1962, scientists at the National Institutes of Health discovered that certain serotypes of human adenoviruses can induce tumors in newborn hamsters. This finding was not only of scientific interest, but it also raised concerns because the military was using live adenoviruses as vaccines against adenovirus-induced acute respiratory disease. Green was asked to learn as much as he could as quickly as possible about the 31 distinct viral serotypes known at that time. His studies included characterizing the viruses’ DNA, investigating the tumor-inducing properties of the viruses, and determining the molecular and kinetic parameters of adenovirus infection. He showed that adenoviruses could be divided into distinct groups based on these and other properties. These classic studies served to establish adenoviruses as a powerful model system that has since been used to address more global questions about virus replication, human cell molecular biology, infection and immunity, and neoplastic transformation. In subsequent years, the study of adenoviruses has provided key insights into tumor suppressors, cell proliferation, and the host immune response. They also emerged as a vehicle for human gene therapy

Also in the early 1960s, Green and others showed that human adenoviruses could transform rodent cells in culture into a malignant state. The mechanism behind this phenomenon was a mystery at that time. In 1966, Green published a paper in the Proceedings of the National Academy of Sciences showing for the first time that transformed cells express adenovirus-specific RNA that could be labeled in a fashion that would allow detection based on hybridization to adenovirus DNA immobilized on filters. This pioneering work helped establish the principle – applicable to all tumor viruses and relevant to tumor oncogenesis more broadly – that adenoviruses transform cells via continuous expression of their genes rather than by a ‘hit-and-run’ mechanism.

In subsequent years, Green made a number of other contributions to adenovirus molecular biology. He discovered two of the proteins required for adenoviruses to transform cells, and also other proteins that usurp the infected cell and convert it into a factory for virus replication. This later work played a key role in further establishing adenovirus as an experimental system, attracting other research groups and producing many important discoveries. For example, RNA splicing was discovered using the adenovirus system by researchers at the Cold Spring Harbor Laboratory and the Massachusetts Institute of Technology (work that led to a Nobel Prize in 1989 and 1993).

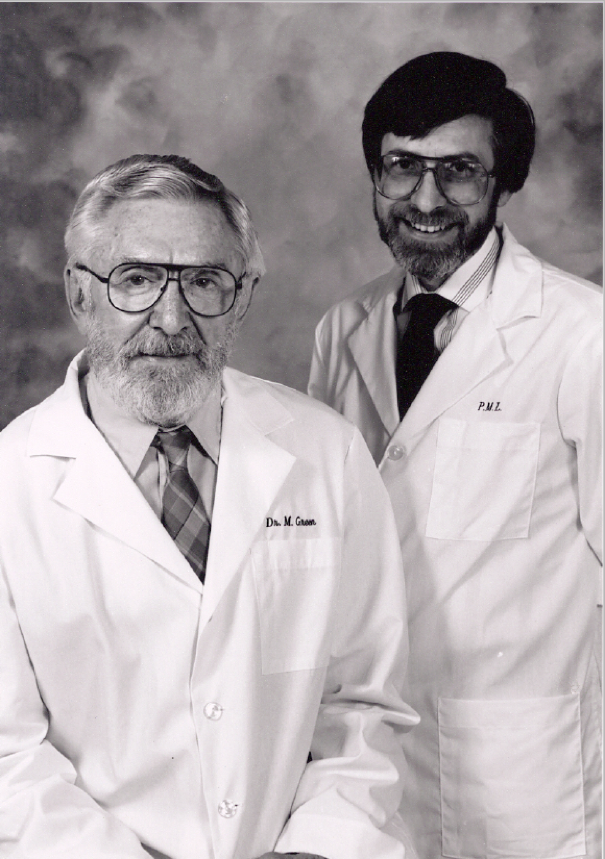
Green with long-time research partner and laboratory member, Paul Lowenstein.

In addition to determining many of the basic concepts of neurovirology, Green conducted seminal studies to determine the role that these viruses play in human cancer. He demonstrated that although these viruses are endemic in the human population and have oncogenic potential in rodents, they appear to play no detectable part in the formation of any of the major human cancers.

Green studied not only adenoviruses but also many other tumorigenic viruses. At the time, it was commonly hypothesized that since tumor viruses cause certain cancers in animal species, they might also cause cancers in humans. Green embarked on a large study to ask whether human cancers contain tumor virus genes. This study, funded by the National Institutes of Health via the Virus Cancer Program, was a major component of President Richard Nixon's "war on cancer". Green collected over 2,500 tumor samples and analyzed them for the presence of different DNA and RNA tumor viruses. Nearly all the samples were negative. These carefully controlled data, which were published in a series of papers, argued strongly against a viral etiology of human cancer. One exception was the detection of papillomavirus DNA in urogenital cancers; Green was probably the first to make this finding, although he was the second to publish it in the scientific literature.

Later, Green's research extended to the RNA tumor viruses (tumor-inducing viruses with an RNA genome). Before reverse transcriptase was discovered by David Baltimore and Howard Temin in 1970 (work that earned them a Nobel Prize), Green wrote a review predicting that the enzyme must exist in the virion of retroviruses. In the early 1970s, he and his co-workers conducted important studies on the biochemical features of reverse transcriptase of avian and murine RNA tumor viruses. These studies revealed the subunit structure of the enzyme and helped define the polymerase and Ribonuclease H activities inherent in that enzyme. He coupled this basic research with the effort to detect RNA tumor viruses in human cancer. Tremendous effort was directed to the ‘simultaneous detection’ assay in which proteins are extracted from tumor samples, separated by size, and then examined for reverse transcriptase activity. There was angst associated with those studies because of the importance of the research and because the workers could occasionally detect weak activity. As was later shown, this activity was not due to infection by RNA tumor viruses, but rather to endogenous reverse transcriptase activity. These studies were negative, again arguing against a viral etiology of cancer.

In recent years, Green has focused his studies on the multifunctional adenovirus oncoprotein E1A, which is necessary for cell transformation of adenovirus non-permissive cells. He was among the first to demonstrate that individual functional domains within E1A are independent, an observation that has since been exploited by other laboratories studying a number of regulatory proteins. Most recently, Green has focused on the 80-amino-acid E1A N-terminal transcriptional repression domain in order to understand the mechanism of gene control and regulation by this potent transcriptional repressor he has also examined the potential application of repressing medically important genes by E1A's transcriptional repression function

Green is known for founding, building, and leading the Institute for Molecular Virology at the Saint Louis University School of Medicine. This institute and its research faculty was the site of numerous important studies on viruses, cancer, AIDS, and contemporary molecular biology.

== Personal life and death ==
Green married Marilyn Glick on August 20, 1950. They had three children.

Green died in St. Louis, Missouri, on December 5, 2017, of natural causes at the age of 91.
