= Leena Kaskela =

Finnish news presenter

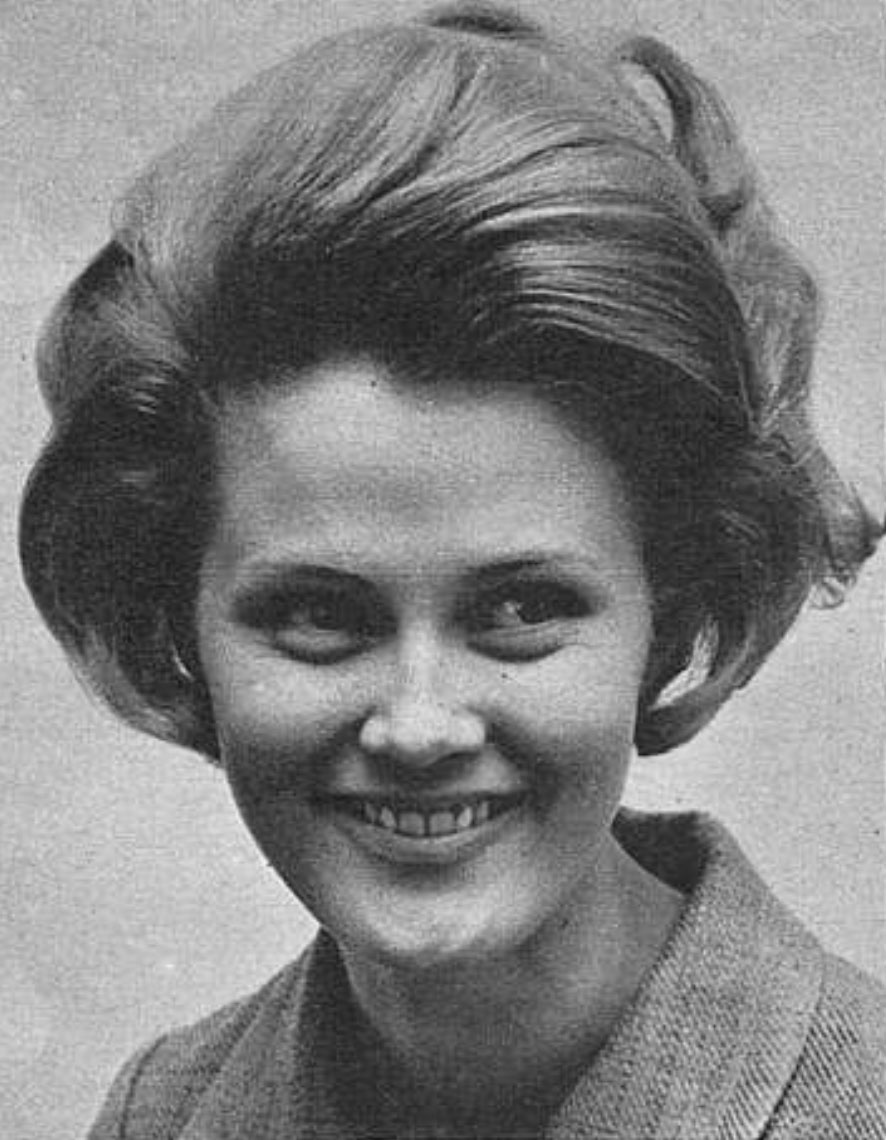

Leena Kaskela (née Rousek; 25 December 1939 in Turku – 2 December 2017 in Helsinki) was a Finnish news reporter on MTV3. She was awarded the Life Academy Award by the Finnish Television Academy in 2014.
