= Gerhard Andlinger =

Austrian-born businessman (1931–2017)

Gerhard Rudolf "Gerry" Andlinger (January 17, 1931, in Linz, Austria – December 22, 2017) was a business executive, philanthropist, sportsman, and founder of the private investment firm Andlinger & Company, Inc.

== Career ==
Following service in the U.S. Army, and becoming a US citizen Andlinger began his career with McKinsey & Company, a noted management consulting firm. In 1960, he was recruited to International Telephone and Telegraph (ITT) by the legendary Harold Geneen as the first director of planning and organization. Andlinger was named Group Executive – Far East in 1962. During that time he was on the board of directors of NEC and Sumitomo Electric. He became the youngest elected Vice President of ITT at the age of 34.

Andlinger left ITT in 1967 to become chairman of Esterline Corporation, but was recruited back to ITT in 1972 as chairman of ITT's Levitt & Sons, Inc. He later was President of ITT Europe and was elected Executive Vice President of ITT Corporation. In 1976, Andlinger formed his own private investment firm, Andlinger & Company, Inc. (A&Co.). He additionally was chairman and CEO of numerous A&Co. portfolio companies. Since its founding, the firm, with offices in the United States, Europe and China, has been involved in over 100 corporate acquisition transactions.

== Academic and personal life ==
In 1948, as a winner of a New York Herald Tribune essay contest for Austrian high school students, Andlinger made his first visit to the United States. At the age of 19, Andlinger received a scholarship to Princeton University – the alma mater of his earlier American student host - with advanced placement as a junior. He graduated from Princeton University in 1952 with a degree in economics and a minor in Arabic language. As part of his degree, Andlinger completed a 137-page long senior thesis titled "The Economic Effect of the Tax on the Unreasonable Accumulation of Profits." He continued his academic career at Harvard Business School and was awarded an M.B.A. in 1954. He also was awarded an honorary doctorate from Bryant College in Rhode Island for contributions to international management.

Andlinger married Jeanne Dailey in 1994, when she was 37 and he was 62.

Andlinger had five children by four different women. His 15-year-old son, Gerhard Andlinger II, committed suicide in 2011.

In 2015, Andlinger purchased Jon Bon Jovi's penthouse at 158 Mercer Street in New York's SoHo neighborhood for $34 million. In 2017 Andlinger listed the property for sale at $38 million but was forced to lower his price to $34 million after it sat on the market for nearly 10 months. The home had six bedrooms, six bathrooms and a chef's kitchen. He also owned a $65 million home in Manhattan's Time Warner Center.

== Philanthropy ==
Andlinger has been a large contributor to Princeton University, leading hospitals in the area of cancer research, and the American Austrian Foundation among many other causes. A $25 million gift to Princeton University in 2000 created the Andlinger Center for the Humanities, and a $100 million gift in 2008 created the Andlinger Center for Energy and the Environment as well as Andlinger Laboratory. He also is active in The Salzburg Festival Society. As an admirer of Austrian Arts, Andlinger has sponsored a variety of causes related to the exchange of art, specifically the Ars Electronics and an Exhibition of Austrian Artists in the U.S. Andlinger endowed the professorship for distance learning at the Joan and Sanford I. Weill Medical College of Cornell University.

== Insider trading ==
Andlinger settled with the SEC an outstanding insider trading allegation by paying disgorgement and civil penalties in excess of $3.4 million and entered into an agreement barring Andlinger from being an officer or director of a public company for five years. He did not admit or deny wrongdoing.
