= Kenneth Clayton =

American chess player (1938–2017)

Personal information
- Born: July 26, 1938 Washington, D.C.
- Died: December 26, 2017 (aged 79) Maryland, U.S.

Chess career
- Country: United States
- Title: Candidate Master (2009)
- Peak rating: 2240 (January 1980)

Kenneth Roger Clayton (July 26, 1938 – December 26, 2017) was an American chess master. He won US Amateur Chess Championship in 1963. He attended Harvard University. His picture was on the cover of the June 1963 issue of Chess Life magazine.

Clayton, along with Walter Harris and Frank Street Jr., have been regarded as pioneers of African-Americans in chess in the 1960s.

Clayton held the FIDE title of Candidate Master and the USCF title of National Master. He died of Alzheimer’s on December 26, 2017.
