= Li Bude =

Chinese military officer and revolutionist

- 李布德

Political commissar of Shanxi Military District
- In office October 1970 – March 1983
- Preceded by: Liu Shihong
- Succeeded by: Liu Yantian

Personal details
- Born: September 1919 Yingshan County, Sichuan, China
- Died: December 13, 2017 (aged 98) Beijing, China
- Party: Chinese Communist Party
- Education: PLA Military Academy

Military service
- Allegiance: People's Republic of China
- Branch/service: People's Liberation Army Ground Force
- Rank: Major general
- Unit: 68th Army
- Battles/wars: Second Sino-Japanese War; Chinese Civil War; Korean War
- Awards: Flag Medal (2nd Class) (1954); Order of Freedom and Independence (2nd Class) (1954); Order of August the First (2nd Class) (1955); Order of Independence and Freedom (2nd Class) (1955); Order of Liberation (China) (2nd Class) (1955); Red Star Medal (1st Class) (1988)

Li Bude (Chinese: 李布德; pinyin: Lǐ Bùdé; September 1919 – 13 December 2017) was a Chinese military officer and revolutionist. He was present at the Battle of Taiyuan in 1949 during the Chinese Civil War and the Battle of Kumsong during the Korean War. He was awarded the rank of major general (shaojiang) in 1955.

== Biography ==
Li was born in Yingshan County, Sichuan in September 1919. He attended an old-style private school at the age of 6. Six years later he dropped out of school due to poverty; he lived by selling straw sandals.

In 1932 he joined guerrillas in his hometown and soon became a messenger in the 27th Division of the 9th Red Army.

In 1933 he participated in the Chinese Workers' and Peasants' Red Army (1928–1937) and two years later he took part in the Communist Youth League of China.

In 1936 he became a cryptographer in the general headquarters of the Red Army. In 1937 he joined the Chinese Communist Party.

In 1942 he was Party branch secretary of the 7th Regiment of the 11th Military District of the Shanxi-Chahaer-Hebei Border Region. Two years later he became political commissar of the 20th Regiment of the 13th Military District; he liberated Zhangjiakou with regimental commander Li Guang (born 1914) after the surrender of Japan.

During the Chinese Civil War in 1949, he attacked Mount Wohu, a military stronghold of Taiyuan, capital of Shanxi province; the Nationalist Army came under assault. They were defeated and fled in disorder.

In 1951, he served as political commissar of 210 Headquarters of the 67th Army in the Korean War; his army killed more than 23,000 enemies. In 1952, he was political commissar of 202 Headquarters of the 68th Army; he participated in the Battle of Kumsong, and his army killed more than 9,700 enemies.

In 1954, Li was promoted to director of the 68th Army. That same year, the Korean Government bestowed the Flag Medal, 2nd Class and the Freedom and Independence Medal, 2nd Class upon him.

In 1955, he attained the rank of major general (shaojiang).

In 1956, he was accepted to the PLA Military Academy.

In 1960, he served as political commissar of Neichangshan Stronghold.

In 1964, he was promoted again to become political commissar of the 68th Army.

In 1970, he rose to become political commissar of Shanxi Military District, and held that office until 1983 when he retired from military service.

On December 13, 2017, he died of illness in Beijing, aged 98.

== Awards ==
- Flag Medal, 2nd Class
- Order of Freedom and Independence, 2nd Class
- Order of Bayi, 3rd Class
- Order of Independence and Freedom, 2nd Class
- Order of Liberation, 2nd Class
- Red Star Medal, 1st Class

Military offices
Preceded by Liu Shihong (刘世洪)	Political commissar of Shanxi Military District; 1970–1983	Succeeded by Liu Yantian (刘炎田)
