= Keturah Kamugasa =

Ugandan writer and journalist

Keturah Lydia Kamugasa
- Died: December 20, 2017
- Citizenship: Uganda
- Education: Bible college, University of Leicester
- Occupations: Journalist, writer
- Employer(s): Flair magazine,newspaper in Uganda
- Notable work: Style with Keturah Kamugasa, Bride and Groom

Keturah Lydia Kamugasa (died December 20, 2017) was a Ugandan writer and journalist most notable for her weekly column in The New Vision daily, called "Style with Keturah Kamugasa". She was also the editor of Flair magazine, New Vision's Bride and Groom (source flair magazine April 2008 and April 2008 for bride and groom magazine). She is leading English-language newspaper in Uganda.

== Career life ==
Kamugasa relocated from Uganda to the United Kingdom, where she pursued religious studies at a Bible college. She later enrolled at the University of Leicester, earning a degree in sociology.

== Death ==
She died on December 20, 2017, at the age of 50.
