= Mathew Hintz =

American painter

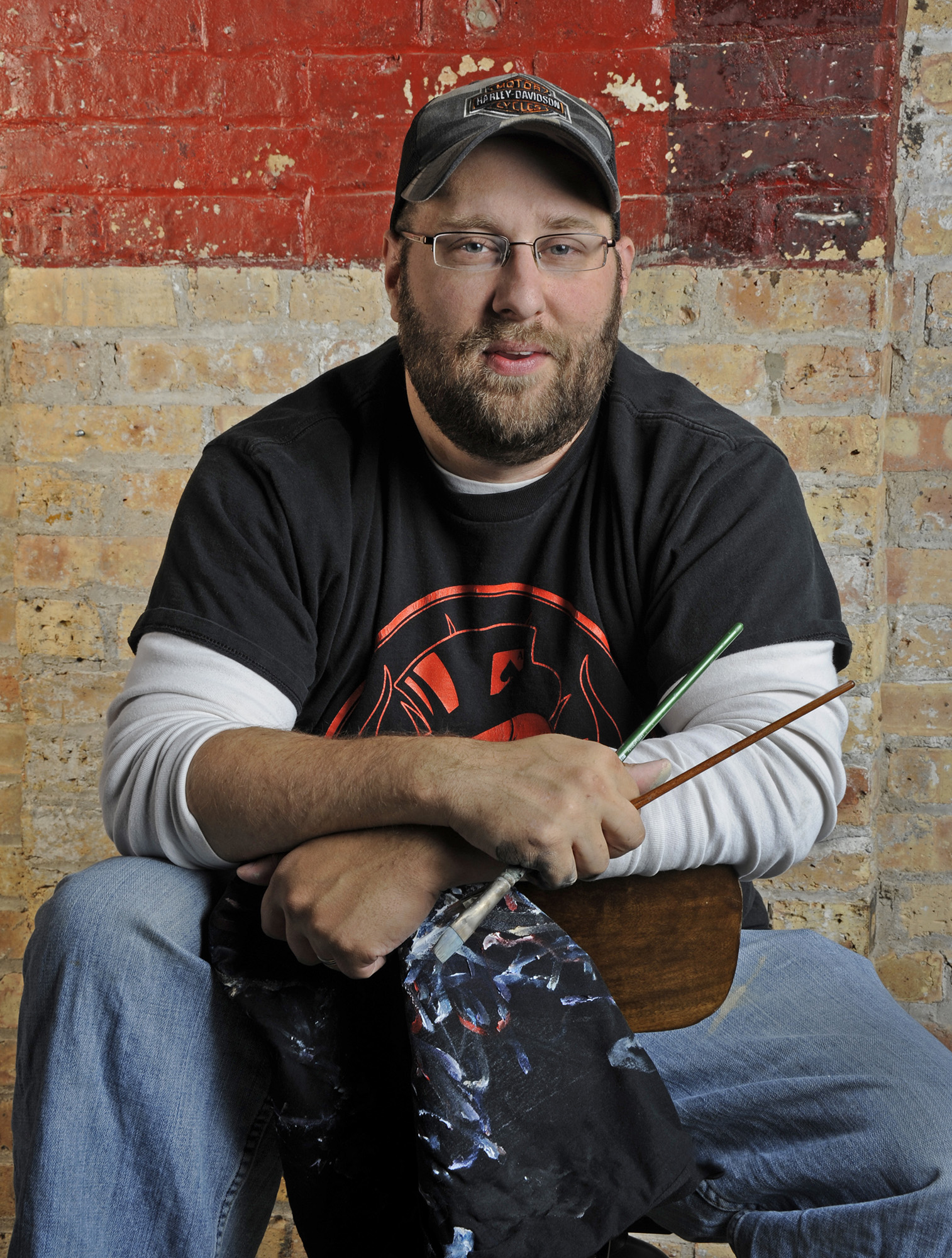
- Born: May 31, 1976; Iron Mountain, Michigan, U.S.
- Died: December 24, 2017 (aged 41); Waukesha, Wisconsin, U.S.
- Education: Milwaukee Institute of Art & Design
- Employer: Harley-Davidson
- Movement: Impressionism
- Spouse: Lisa Hintz
- Website: hintzstudios.com

Mathew A. Hintz (May 31, 1976 – December 24, 2017), known professionally as Mathew "boo" Hintz, was an American painter who painted and drew in the impressionist style. He focused on motorcycles and motorcycle cultures, specifically Harley-Davidson.

== Education ==
In 1994, Mathew "boo" Hintz enrolled at The Milwaukee Institute of Art & Design (MIAD) and graduated in 1998 with a BFA in Painting. During his studies, Hintz interned at The Harley-Davidson Motor Company and was introduced to the motorcycle world of styling and design. Hintz's internship continued with Harley-Davidson for two years (1996–98).

== Career ==
After graduating from MIAD, Mathew "boo" Hintz followed his passion and he continued his relationship with Harley-Davidson and later, co-founded Studios 304 (1998). As a sub-contractor for Harley-Davidson Motor Company, Hintz provided design, graphics, artwork and digital photo retouching services. Establishing and proving his talent as a styling and graphic designer, Hintz continued his work with the motorcycle giant, working closely with others in the Styling Department and Creative Services, creating motorcycle paint designs, helmet graphics, and tank medallions. As a steward of the brand, his works provided numerous contributions to the legend that is Harley-Davidson. One of Hintz's first assignments was to work on the design of the tank medallion for the Softail Deluxe. He then worked with styling and marketing to design additional medallions and graphics for Harley-Davidson.

Mathew "boo" Hintz's professional portfolio boasted rocker patches, t-shirts, logos and graphics for HOG, Buell, Motorclothes, Harley-Davidson anniversary merchandise and models. He painted the cover art for all of the Harley-Davidson Owner Manuals from 2008 to 2017. In 2005, and at the request of friends and co-workers, he began painting portraits of the iconic motorcycles. As the demand for his work grew, Hintz discovered the powerful fusion of his artistic talents with a shared fervor for all things Harley-Davidson.

In 2013, Hintz co-created a painting of a purple Harley-Davidson Softail Breakout motorcycle with Reagan Imhoff, who was the Muscular Dystrophy Association Ambassador for Wisconsin. The painting raised $3,500 for the Muscular Dystrophy Association. The pair collaborated again in 2014, and that painting raised more than $10,000 for MDA.

In 2014, Hintz became one of Harley-Davidson's licensed fine artists and formed Hintz Studios. As an official Harley-Davidson artist, Hintz was able to use his work to better support the brand and allow the motorcycle enthusiasts a new artistic outlet for their passions. In 2014, Mathew "boo" Hintz knew he could spend more time behind the canvas doing what he was trained to do: paint.

Hintz's motorcycle portraits were inspired by the special details that make each model special. Brushstrokes heavily laden with acrylic paint allowed Hintz to "sculpt" as he painted, creating a unique three-dimensional sculptural surface. The process of Hintz's paint application process results in a signature, impressionistic style that make his paintings distinctive. Like a clear coat finish on a motorcycle, Hintz's paintings are finished layer upon layer with glaze for a glossy shine.

Beginning in 2014, Hintz created series of limited edition prints to offer enthusiasts a more affordable way to collect his work. On January 19, 2016, at a Harley-Davidson Dealership Show in Phoenix Arizona, Hintz released his Aluminum Series prints. The Aluminum Series utilized the most technologically advanced printers to print directly on an aluminum sheet material.

His work is a good relation and emotion of the brand

— Willie G. Davidson

== Death ==
Mathew Hintz died unexpectedly on December 24, 2017.
