= Roland Peterson =

Aruba police commissioner (1941-2017)

Commissioner of the Aruba Police Force
- In office 1986–1989
- Preceded by: Position created
- Succeeded by: Lucas E. Rasmijn

Personal details
- Born: Roland Wilbert Peterson; 31 October 1941 Aruba
- Died: 11 December 2017 (aged 76) Aruba
- Spouse: Martha Peterson-Hagen
- Children: Two

Roland Wilbert Peterson (31 October 1941 – 11 December 2017) was an Aruban police officer, writer and poet.

== Biography ==
Peterson was tasked with creating the new Aruba Police Force in 1986, when Aruba became an autonomous constituent country within the Kingdom of the Netherlands. In addition to founding the island's police department, Peterson served as the first Commissioner of the Aruba Police Department from 1986 until 1989. In 1987, he completed a 12-week training seminar on law enforcement and anti-terrorism tactics held at the FBI Academy in Quantico, Virginia.

Peterson later became head of the government agency, DOOV, the predecessor of the present-day Department of Integration and Management of Foreigners (DIMAS). He was also Aruba's Interpol representative.

Roland Peterson died at his home on Aruba following a long illness with Parkinson's disease on 11 December 2017, at the age of 76. He was survived by his wife, Martha Peterson-Hagen, and two children, Angelique Peterson and Roland Peterson Jr.
