= H. K. Brown Jr. =

American football coach

Biographical details
- Born: January 27, 1938
- Died: December 17, 2017 (aged 79)

Coaching career (HC unless noted)
- 1964: Apprentice

Head coaching record
- Overall: 0–8

Harry Kenneth Brown Jr. (January 27, 1938 – December 17, 2017) was an American football coach. He was the 20th head football coach at The Apprentice School in Newport News, Virginia and he held that position for the 1964 season. His coaching record at Apprentice was 0–8.
