= Jean-Pierre Lehmann =

Swiss economist (1945–2017)

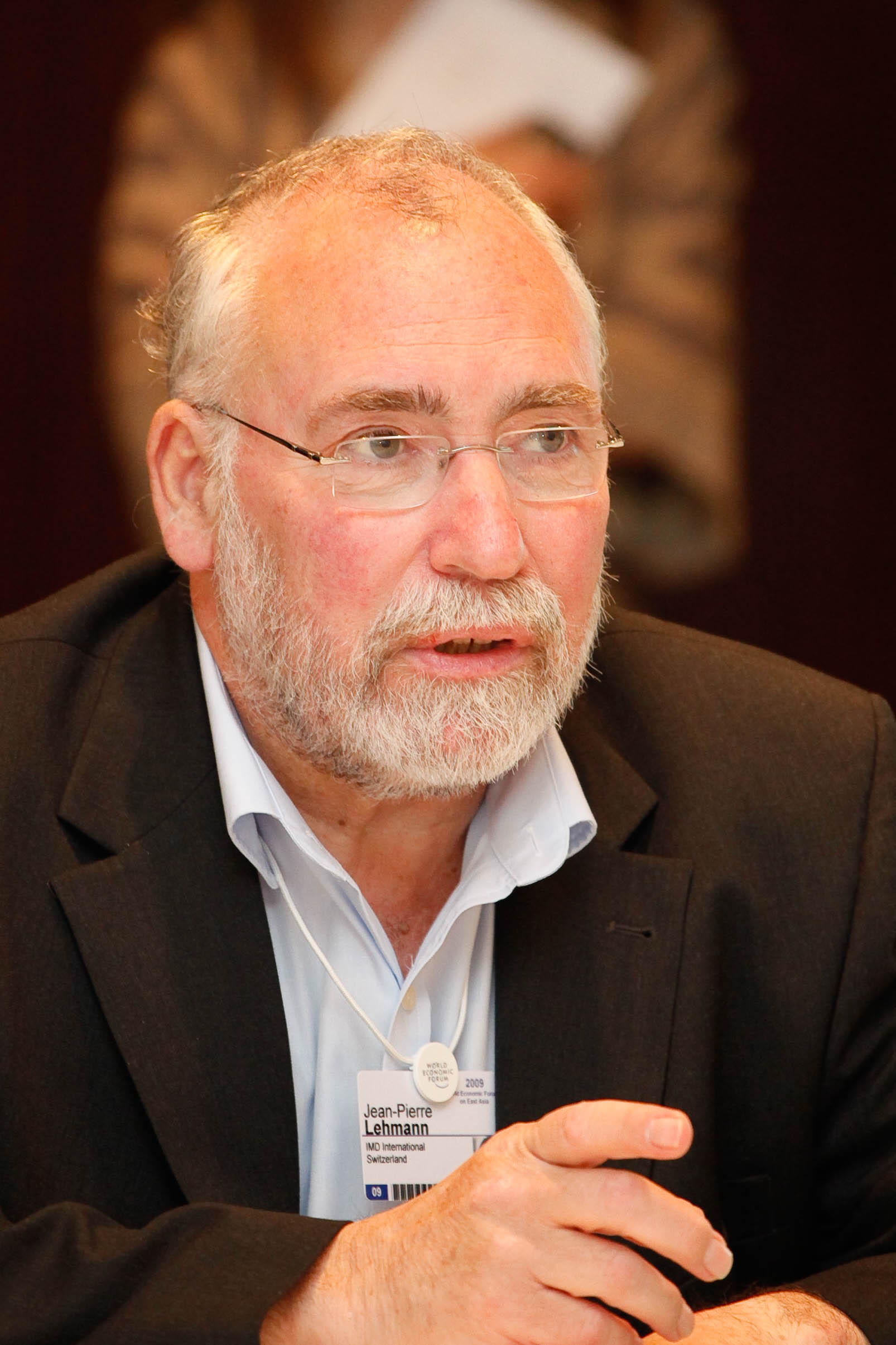
Jean-Pierre Lehmann at the World Economic Forum on East Asia in 2009

Jean-Pierre Lehmann (29 August 1945 – 21 December 2017) was a Swiss economist who was professor of international political economy at IMD and the founding director of The Evian Group at IMD. In August 2011, he was appointed senior fellow at the Fung Global Institute (FGI), a think-tank producing innovative thinking and research on global issues from Asian perspectives.

== Biography ==
Lehmann was born in Washington, D.C., on 29 August 1945. He spent most of his childhood and adolescence between Japan and Europe. In 1966 he obtained his bachelor's degree from Georgetown University's School of Foreign Service and subsequently he did his doctorate at Oxford University (St Antony's College), where he was from 1967 to 1970.

Lehmann's areas of special interest include globalisation, global governance, trade and development, the role of business in reduction of poverty and inequality and the socio-economic, cultural, and business dynamics of Asia. He acts in various leading capacities in a number of public policy institutes and organisations, as an adviser to governments and corporations, and as a frequent commentator in the international media. He is the author of several books and numerous articles and papers primarily dealing with globalisation, modern East Asian history and East Asia and the international political economy.

In 1995, Lehmann launched The Evian Group, an international coalition of corporate, government, and opinion leaders, united by a common vision of enhancing global prosperity for the benefit of all by fostering an open, inclusive and equitable global market economy in a rules-based multilateral framework. The Evian Group, based at IMD in Lausanne (Switzerland), has developed as a leading global voice on global trade and investment issues that acts as a forum for dialogue and a birthplace of ideas; it also engages actively in advocacy to counter the forces of protectionism and chauvinism. Lehmann works closely with a number of international forums and think tanks, including the World Economic Forum where he is a member of two of its GACs (Global Agenda Councils), on Trade and on the Future of China.

Prior to joining IMD, Lehmann's journalist, academic and business careers encompassed activities in virtually all Asian and Western European countries, as well as North America. He was founding director of the European Institute of Japanese Studies (EIJS) at the Stockholm School of Economics (from 1992) and Professor of East Asian Political Economy and Business. He established and directed the East Asian operations of InterMatrix, a London-based business strategy research and consulting organization (1986–1992). During this time he was concurrently Affiliated Professor of International Business at the London Business School.

Previously, Lehmann was associate professor of International Business at INSEAD, visiting professor at the Bologna Center (Italy) of the Johns Hopkins University School of Advanced International Studies, twice visiting professor and Japan Foundation Fellow at the University of Tohoku (Japan), also visiting professor for MBA courses at the University of Hong Kong, and founding director of the Center for Japanese Studies at the University of Stirling (Scotland), where he also taught East Asian history. He also directed the EC-ASEAN 'Transfer of Technology and Socio-Economic Development Programs' (1981–1986).

He died in Lausanne on 21 December 2017.

== Teaching and presentations ==
Lehmann teaches both a core course and various electives in the IMD MBA program. He has been involved in annual MBA student project research field trips to Argentina, Bangladesh, Bosnia-Herzegovina, Kenya and South Africa. Professor Lehmann teaches in a number of IMD executive education programs, including OWP (Orchestrating Winning Performance), LGE (Leading the Global Enterprise) and EMBA (Executive Master of Business Administration). He is a frequent contributor to IMD's Corporate Learning Network (CLN) and will release a series of global leaders’ podcasts in early 2011.

== Publications ==
Lehmann frequently writes articles on key issues of the day in journals and online publications. This includes numerous and diverse contributions to the IMD Tomorrow's Challenges series. He writes a monthly column for the Chinese language magazine China Entrepreneur (CEC). Many of his publications also appear in YaleGlobal Online, The Globalist and Project Syndicate.

Reflecting his PhD (D.Phil) at Oxford's St Antony's College on Japanese economic history in the late Edo and earl Meiji eras (1850s to 1880s), Lehmann has maintained his interest in Japan about which he has written several books, the most recent, in March 2009, was co-authored with John Haffner and Tomas Casas i Klett and is entitled Japan’s Open Future: An Agenda for Global Citizenship.

He has edited with his son, Fabrice Lehmann, a work commissioned by the ICC (International Chamber of Commerce) Research Foundation, entitled World Peace and Prosperity Through World Trade – Achieving the 1919 Vision published by Cambridge University Press in October 2010. The book is composed of individual short op-ed style chapters from 58 contributors from 26 different countries and from diverse professions and disciplines.

== Personal ==
Lehmann has been married for over 40 years to Françoise Lehmann née Domergue; he has three children and seven grandchildren.
