= Gao Bolong =

Chinese laser physicist

- Born: 29 June 1928; Nanning, Guangxi, China
- Died: 6 December 2017 (aged 89); Beijing, China
- Education: Tsinghua University
- Scientific career
- Fields: Applied physics
- Workplaces: National University of Defense Technology

Gao Bolong (Chinese: 高伯龙; pinyin: Gāo Bólóng; Wade–Giles: Kao Po-lung; 1928–2017) was a pioneering Chinese laser physicist.

Gao was born in Nanning, Guangxi. Following his father, he lived in several cities in his childhood. When the Japanese invaded Guangxi in 1944, Gao joined the Nationalist Army. He returned to school after the end of the WWII. In 1951, he graduated in physics from Tsinghua University.

Gao hoped to engage in basic research, but was assigned to then Institute of Applied Physics of the Chinese Academy of Sciences. He was transferred to Harbin Institute of Military Engineering in 1954, and then to Changsha in 1970. Gao was appointed the leader of a scientific team to develop the domestic ring laser gyroscope there. The final prototype was built in 1994. He also improved the coating technology. He became a professor in 1978, and was elected an academician of the Chinese Academy of Engineering in 1997.

During the Anti-Rightist Campaign, Gao was denounced for "lacking progressive political consciousness" in 1958 and banished to the countryside, where he developed asthma. When the Cultural Revolution began, he was denounced again.
