= Subbarao Krishnamurthy =

Indian cricketer (1938–2017)

Subbarao Krishnamurthy (26 October 1938 – 7 December 2017) was an Indian first-class cricketer who played for and captained Mysore. In thirty two first class cricket matches as a wicket keeper between 1957 and 1968 he scored 1,336 runs at a batting average of 27.26 with thirty catches and fifteen stumpings with the gloves.
