= James R. Thompson (statistician) =

American statistician

James Robert Thompson (June 18, 1938 – December 4, 2017) was an American mathematician, statistician, and university professor whose most influential work combined applied mathematics and nonparametric statistics with computing technologies to advance the fields of financial engineering and computational finance, model disease progression, assess problems in public health, and optimize quality control in industrial manufacturing.

Thompson was a longtime faculty member of Rice University in Houston, Texas. He joined the university in 1970 as an associate professor in the Wiess School of Natural Sciences' Department of Mathematical Sciences. He became the founding chair of the Department of Statistics in 1987. The department moved to the George R. Brown School of Engineering in 1990. Thompson retired from Rice in 2016 as the Noah Harding Emeritus Professor of Statistics.

During his career, Thompson authored or co-authored 14 books, including his most cited books Models for Investors in Real World Markets, Empirical Model Building: Data, Models, and Reality 2nd ed., and Statistical Process Control for Quality Improvement, co-authored with Jacek Koronacki. Thompson was a principal investigator for the United States Army Research Office (ARO), National Aeronautics and Space Administration (NASA), and the United Nations Industrial Development Organization (UNIDO). From 1991-1993, he directed a team of 12 Polish statisticians to teach statistical process control in the newly-liberated Polish factories after the fall of communism. The training manual and teachings are reflected in the previously mentioned book Statistical Process Control: The Deming Paradigm and Beyond.

Thompson and his collaborators are most recently known for the quantitative exploration of the capital asset pricing model (CAPM), and several approaches in exploratory data analysis, which involve looking at data from different angles. These non-parametric approaches to portfolio formulation included the Simugram™, variants of his Max-Median rule and Tukey weightings.

The MaxMedian rule is nonproprietary and was designed for investors who wish to do their own investing on a laptop with the purchase of 20 stocks. Simugram™ is an empirical data-based paradigm for portfolio selection. The algorithm synchronizes the historical performance of stocks in a selection set. The information from Simugram™ is then used to develop a high return, low risk portfolio. US Patent 7,720,738 B2, May 18, 2010. The simulation-based data analysis challenges the Efficient Market Hypothesis (EMH) and the Black-Scholes-Merton option pricing formula, making Thompson an early critic of the hypothesis in financial economics. The research was funded by $10 million NSF grants awarded to Rice University in 2003 and 2008 for Vertical Integration of Research and Education in the Mathematical Sciences (VIGRE).

Thompson was a long-term collaborator who united physicians and medical researchers in the Texas Medical Center with university researchers in mathematics and biostatistics to analyze coronary artery disease, cancer, and HIV/AIDS. In 1977, he began working with clinicians and researchers at the Baylor College of Medicine to statistically correlate the relationship between plasma lipid concentrations and coronary artery disease.

Thompson also served as an adjunct professor (1977–2017) at the University of Texas MD Anderson Cancer Center and the University of Texas School of Public Health. He was known for the development of the Multivariate Simulation-Based Parameter Estimation (SIMEST) model, which was used to estimate breast cancer parameters and simulate the growth and spread of malignant tumors. His work in mathematical biology also positioned him as an early proponent of the prevention and control of contagious diseases, such as HIV/AIDS, by case isolation, quarantine, and public education. He is particularly known for his work in correlating the effect that the HIV epidemic had on an increased number of tuberculosis cases in the United States.

Thompson was a member of the International Statistical Institute (1982). He was elected Fellow of the American Statistical Association (1984) and founded the ASA Houston Chapter in 1981. He was also elected Fellow of the Institute of Mathematical Statistics (1988).

== University history ==
- 2016 - 2017 Noah Harding Emeritus Professor of Statistics, Department of Statistics, Rice University
- 2000 - 2015 Noah Harding Professor of Statistics, Department of Statistics, Rice University
- 1993 - 1996 Chair, Department of Statistics, George R. Brown School of Engineering, Rice University
- 1990 - Adjunct Professor, University of Texas School of Public Health
- 1988 - 1997 Adjunct Professor of Pathology, Baylor College of Medicine
- 1987 - Professor of Statistics, Department of Statistics, Rice University
- 1987 - 1990 Founding Chair, Department of Statistics, Wiess School of Natural Sciences, Rice University
- 1977 - Adjunct Professor, University of Texas MD Anderson Cancer Center
- 1977 - 1990 Professor of Mathematical Sciences, Rice University
- 1970 - 1977 Associate Professor of Mathematical Sciences, Wiess School of Natural Sciences, Rice University
- 1967 - 1970 Assistant Professor of Mathematics, Indiana University
- 1965 - 1967 Assistant Professor of Engineering Mathematics, Vanderbilt University
- 1964 - 1965 Instructor of Engineering Mathematics, Vanderbilt University

== Honors and awards ==
Thompson received the Founder’s Medal as first in his class when he graduated from Vanderbilt University in 1960. While earning his doctorate degree at Princeton University, he was a Fulbright Scholar, Woodrow Wilson Fellow, and NSF Graduate Research Fellow. He was the recipient of the jointly awarded Samuel S. Wilks Memorial Award (1991) by the American Statistical Association (ASA) and the U.S. Army for his outstanding contributions to applied statistics and the advancement of scientific knowledge. He was also awarded the ASA Don Owen Award (1985) for his work in applied statistics and quality control.

== Education ==
Thompson graduated from Memphis High School. He earned a Bachelor of Engineering (B.E.) in 1960 from Vanderbilt University before graduating with a Master of Arts in Mathematics (M.A.) in 1963 and a Doctor of Philosophy (Ph.D.) in Mathematics in 1965 from Princeton University. His dissertation was supervised by John Wilder Tukey.
