= Trevor Jack Cole =

British-born Canadian non-fiction author specializing in gardening (1934-2017)

- Born: 20 April 1934; United Kingdom
- Died: 31 December 2017 (aged 83)
- Occupation: Writer
- Spouse: Brenda Briggs (m. 1960)
- Awards: Canada 125 medal (1992)

Trevor Jack Cole (20 April 1934 – 31 December 2017) was a non-fiction author specializing in gardening topics. He was based in Ottawa, Ontario, Canada at Kinburn.

Cole was born in the United Kingdom. From 1958 to 1960, he trained at the Royal Botanic Gardens, Kew in England, where he met Brenda Briggs, his future wife. They married in 1960 upon graduation from Kew.

He moved to Canada in 1967, continuing his career in horticulture. Cole worked at the Central Experimental Farm from 1967 through to his retirement as the last Curator of the Dominion Arboretum in 1995.

Cole was also a columnist for the Ottawa Citizen and a consultant for Reader's Digest in Canada. He was recognized internationally for his work in horticulture and garden writing. He was the author of the Canadian best seller The Ontario Gardener and edited many gardening books for publishers including Reader's Digest and Dorling Kindersley. He was the president of the Ottawa Horticultural Society from 1974 to 1976 and again in 1980. Cole was also a former director of the Rhododendron Society of Canada.

In later life he took up singing, and was part of the Arnprior Community Choir and led The Sounds of Music chorus at the Kanata Senior Center.

== Awards and recognition ==
Cole received a Canada 125 medal in 1992. He has also received other recognitions for his horticultural writing.

== Bibliography ==
- 1983: Perennials in Your Garden (Agriculture Canada) ISBN 0-660-11334-1
  - 1983: French version, Les fleurs vivaces de votre jardin ISBN 0-660-91040-3
- 1991: The Ontario Gardener (Whitecap) ISBN 1-895099-42-0
- 1993: Canadian editor, Practical Guide to Gardening in Canada with Editor-in-Chief Christopher Brickell (Reader's Digest) ISBN 0-88850-206-0
- 1993: consulting editor, The American Horticultural Society Encyclopedia of Gardening with Editor-in-Chief Christopher Brickell (Dorling Kindersley) ISBN 1-56458-291-4
- 1996: Gardening With Trees and Shrubs in Ontario, Quebec and the Northeastern U.S. (Whitecap) ISBN 1-55110-400-8
- 1996: editor Reader's Digest A-Z Encyclopedia of Garden Plants, with Christopher Brickell and Judith D. Zuk (Reader's Digest) ISBN 0-88850-603-1
- 2000: chief consultant, New Illustrated Guide to Gardening in Canada with Philomena Rutherford (Reader's Digest) ISBN 0-88850-681-3
  - 2000: French version, Nouveau guide illustré du jardinage au Canada ISBN 0-88850-682-1
- 2001: The New Ontario Gardener (Whitecap) ISBN 1-55285-086-2
- 2001: Canadian editor, Canadian Encyclopedia of Plants and Flowers with editor-in-chief Christopher Brickell (Dorling Kindersley) ISBN 1-55363-006-8
- 2001: Canadian editor, Practical Guide to Gardening in Canada with editor-in-chief Christopher Brickell (Dorling Kindersley) paperback: ISBN 1-55363-001-7, hardcover: ISBN 1-55363-001-7
- 2003: editor-in-chief, Great Canadian Plant Guide (Dorling Kindersley) ISBN 1-55363-013-0
- 2003: editor, Gardening Manual for Canada (Dorling Kindersley) ISBN 1-55363-025-4
- 2004: editor-in-chief, What Grows Where in Canadian Gardens (Dorling Kindersley) ISBN 1-55363-026-2
- 2004: editor, A-Z encyclopedia of garden plants with Christopher Brickell (Dorling Kindersley) ISBN 1-55363-041-6
- 2004: Canadian editor, Canadian Encyclopedia of Gardening with editor-in-chief Christopher Brickell (Dorling Kindersley) ISBN 1-55363-034-3
- 2005: Canadian consultant, Care Free Plants (Reader's Digest) ISBN 0-88850-779-8
