= Mary Louise Hancock =

American politician (1920–2017)

New Hampshire State Senator – 15th District
- In office January 1977 – July 1979

New Hampshire State Planning Director
- In office March 1960 – September 1976

Personal details
- Born: July 5, 1920 Franklin, New Hampshire, U.S.
- Died: December 4, 2017 (aged 97)
- Party: Democratic

Mary Louise Hancock (July 5, 1920 – December 4, 2017) was a New Hampshire state senator, New Hampshire State Planning Director and was often referred to as the 'Grand Dame' and the 'Queen Bee' of New Hampshire politics. She is a long term resident of New Hampshire's capital city of Concord and was the first woman to be elected senator from the state's 15th district. She received both the Robert Frost Award and the Susan B. Anthony Award. She has received honorary degrees from Keene State College as well as Notre Dame College of New Hampshire. Hancock was a distant relative of famed revolutionary John Hancock. Hancock died on December 4, 2017, at the age of 97.

== Mary Louise Hancock Day ==
In 2000, Governor Jeanne Shaheen proclaimed July 5, Hancock's birthday, to be Mary Louise Hancock Day throughout her home state of New Hampshire.

== Lighting of the dome ==
On January 4, 1979, Hancock joined with then-New Hampshire governor Hugh Gallen to relight the golden dome atop the New Hampshire State House. The previous governor, Meldrim Thomson, Jr., had ordered the lights to remain off during his term. During Hancock's second term as a state senator she met with the newly elected Gallen, and together they flipped the switch in the first days of his governorship.
