= Piet Kuiper =

Dutch botanist

Pieter Jan Cornelis "Piet" Kuiper (30 July 1934 – 10 December 2017) was a Dutch botanist. He was professor of plant physiology at the University of Groningen from 1974 to 1999.

Kuiper was born in Hoorn. He obtained his PhD in 1961 at the Landbouwhogeschool in Wageningen. Kuiper helped doctors in determining species of mushrooms in poisoning cases. He died, together with his wife, on 10 December 2017.

Kuiper was elected a member of the Royal Netherlands Academy of Arts and Sciences in 1983.
