= Senta Raizen =

Austrian-born American scientist and educator

Senta Amon Raizen
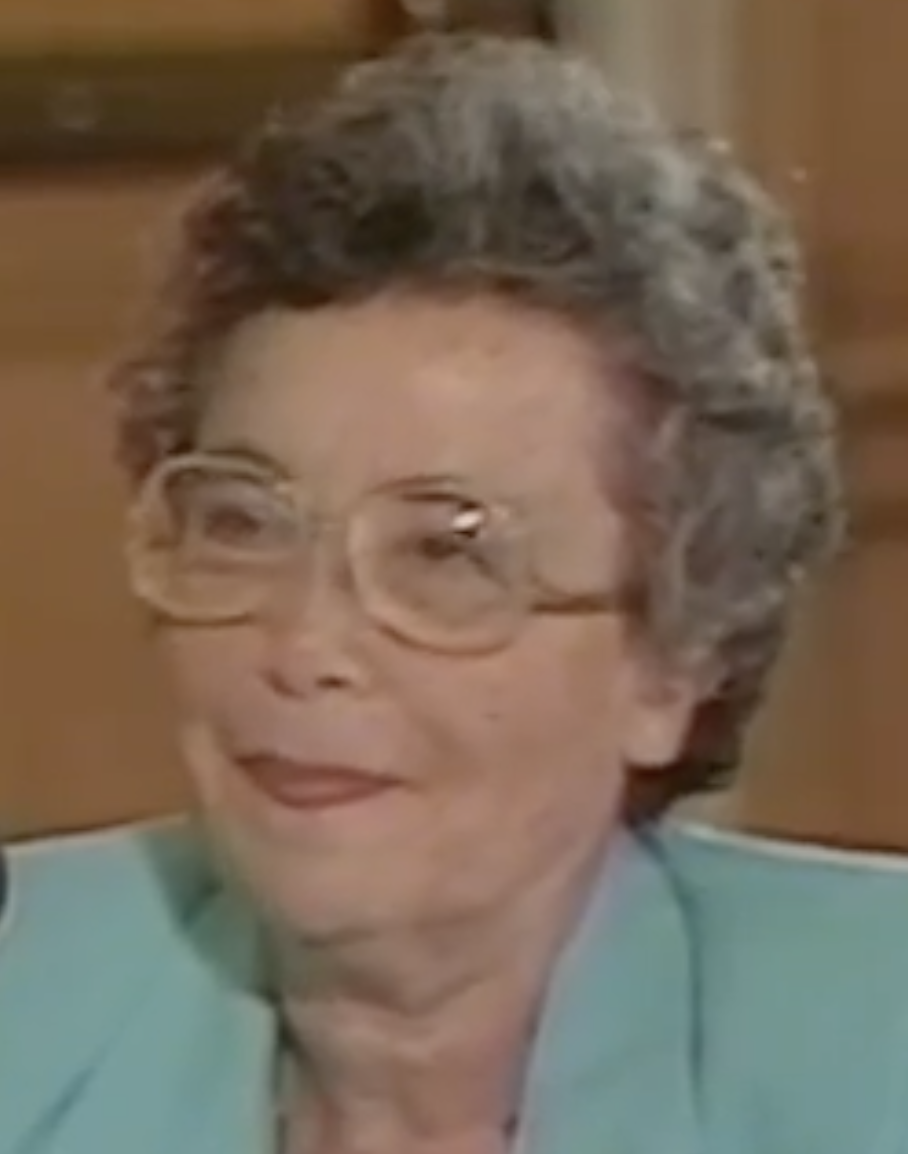
- Born: 28 October 1924; Vienna, Austria
- Died: 23 December 2017 (aged 93); Arlington, VA
- Education: Guilford College, Bryn Mawr College
- Known for: Science education
- Spouse: Abraham Alfred "Al" Raizen

Senta Amon Raizen (28 October 1924 – 23 December 2017) was an Austrian-born American scientist and educator.

== Early life ==
Senta Raizen spent her childhood in Vienna, Austria until the age of 13 when her parents sent her to study in the Netherlands and later at Sidcot School in England to escape the German occupation of Austria. She then transferred to George School in Pennsylvania when her parents immigrated to the United States. Raizen graduated Guilford College in 1944 and received a Master's degree from Bryn Mawr College.

== Career ==
After college, Raizen worked as a chemist at Sun Oil Company and later as a science educator and Director at WestEd. She founded the National Center for Improving Science Education and worked there until her retirement.

In 1991, Raizen spoke about improving the US school system at the National Education Goals Panel.

It's all very well to test [learning] outcomes in terms of achievement. If we don't know what leads to those outcomes and how we need to change the [teaching] practices so we get better outcomes, then we can collect outcome information forever and we probably won't be improving very much.

The Virginia House of Delegates passed a resolution in 2018 celebrating Raizen's life and contributions.

== Personal life ==
Senta Raizen married Abraham Alfred "Al" Raizen and had three children, Helen, Michael, and Daniel.
