= Kristen Rohlfs =

German astronomer

Kristen Rohlfs (13 May 1930 in Humptrup – 10 December 2017) was a professor for astrophysics. He taught astronomy at the University of Bochum from 1974 to 1995.

== Literature ==
- Tools of Radio Astronomy. 1986 ISBN 3-540-40387-6
