= Augie Herchenratter =

Canadian ice hockey player

- Born: August 10, 1919 Kitchener, Ontario, Canada
- Died: December 7, 2017 (aged 98) Waterloo, Ontario, Canada
- Height: 5 ft 9 in (175 cm)
- Weight: 150 lb (68 kg; 10 st 10 lb)
- Position: Right wing
- Shot: Right
- Played for: Springfield Indians; New Haven Eagles; Providence Reds; Philadelphia Rockets; Hershey Bears; Cleveland Barons; Washington Lions
- Playing career: 1938–1949

August Paul Herman "Pete" Herchenratter (August 10, 1919 – December 7, 2017) was a Canadian professional ice hockey player who played for the Springfield Indians, New Haven Eagles, Providence Reds, Philadelphia Rockets, Hershey Bears, Cleveland Barons and Washington Lions in the American Hockey League. In 2014, Herchenratter was nominated for and received the French Legion d'Honneur for his military service during World War II. He was the brother of Art Herchenratter. He died in December 2017 at the age of 98.
