= Barbara Balmer =

Scottish artist and teacher (1929–2017)

Barbara Balmer RSA
- Born: 23 September 1929; Birmingham, England
- Died: 31 December 2017 (aged 88)
- Known for: Painting
- Spouse: George Mackie

Barbara Balmer RSA (23 September 1929 – 31 December 2017) was a Scottish artist and teacher.

== Biography ==
Balmer was born in Birmingham and, between 1946 and 1951, studied art at Coventry School of Art and then at the Edinburgh College of Art. A travelling scholarship enabled Balmer to further her studies in France and Spain during 1951 and 1952. She also visited Italy with a group led by Douglas Percy Bliss. From 1970 to 1980, Balmer was a visiting lecturer at Gray's School of Art in Aberdeen. Seven of her paintings were adapted as dust jackets for editions in the Virago Modern Classics series. A large mural by Balmer is situated in Cumbernauld Town Hall.

Balmer had a solo exhibition at the Aberdeen Art Gallery during 1995 and 1996. She was a regular exhibitor at the Royal Scottish Academy, the Society of Scottish Artists and the Royal Scottish Society of Painters in Watercolour and also with the Glasgow Group and regularly at the Richard Demarco Gallery in Edinburgh, where she had a solo show in 1970. Balmer's portrait of Demarco is in the Scottish National Portrait Gallery and several other public galleries hold examples of her work. A retrospective exhibition of her work was held at the Aberdeen Art Gallery and toured to venues in Dundee, Lincoln and Coventry.

Balmer lived and worked at various times in Aberdeen, Edinburgh and most recently in Stamford in Lincolnshire. A working visit to Tuscany was an annual event. She was married, for some 65 years, to the artist and designer George Mackie and the couple had two daughters.
