= Liu Lunxian =

Chinese politician and military officer

- 刘伦贤

Commander of the 31st Group Army
- In office April 1990 – November 1992
- Preceded by: Chen Xitao
- Succeeded by: Dong Wanrui

Chief of Staff of the Nanjing Military Region
- In office June 1985 – April 1990
- Preceded by: Zhou Deli
- Succeeded by: Zhang Zongde

Personal details
- Born: December 1943 Shanghai, Japanese-occupied China
- Died: December 4, 2017 (aged 74) Shanghai, China
- Party: Chinese Communist Party
- Education: PLA Military Academy; PLA National Defence University; Central Party School of the Chinese Communist Party

Military service
- Allegiance: People's Republic of China
- Branch/service: People's Liberation Army Ground Force
- Years of service: 1961–2000
- Rank: Lieutenant general
- Unit: 31st Group Army

Liu Lunxian (simplified Chinese: 刘伦贤; traditional Chinese: 劉倫賢; pinyin: Liú Lúnxián; December 1943 – 4 December 2017) was a Chinese politician and military officer. Liu was promoted to the rank of major general (shaojiang) in September 1988 and lieutenant general (zhongjiang) in July 1993.

He was a delegate to the 13th and 14th National Congress of the Chinese Communist Party and a deputy to 7th and 9th National People's Congress.

== Biography ==
Liu was born in December 1943 in Shanghai. In 1960 Liu worked shortly as a teller in Sanguan Grain Management of Fengxian County before joining the People's Liberation Army in 1961. He was a part-time student at PLA Military Academy (September 1980-July 1982), PLA National Defence University (December 1993-April 1995) and Central Party School of the Chinese Communist Party (August 1996-December 1998).

In December 1966, during the Cultural Revolution, he was a staff officer in the Nanjing Military Region, serving in the post until the end of the Cultural Revolution in January 1978. He was deputy director of the Department of War of Nanjing Military Region Command from 1978-1980, and he was director from 1980 to 1982. In 1985 he was promoted to become the chief of staff of Nanjing Military Region, a position he held until 1990. In April 1990 he was commander of the 31st Group Army, and held that office until November 1992. Then he was deputy commander of Nanjing Military Region. Liu was promoted to the rank of lieutenant general (zhong jiang) in July 1993. In April 1995, he was transferred to Jinan and appointed deputy commander of Jinan Military Region.

Liu entered politics in February 2000, when he served as Vice Chairman of the Shanghai Municipal People's Congress.

On December 4, 2017, Liu died in Shanghai, aged 74.

Military offices
Preceded by Zhou Deli (周德礼)	Chief of Staff of Nanjing Military Region; 1985–1990	Succeeded by Zhang Zongde (张宗德)
Preceded by Chen Xitao (陈希滔)	Commander of the 31st Group Army; 1990–1992	Succeeded by Dong Wanrui (董万瑞)
