= Tong Zhipeng =

Chinese telecommunications engineer

Tong Zhipeng (Chinese: 童志鵬; 12 August 1924 – 19 December 2017) was a Chinese telecommunications engineer.

He was born in Cixi, Zhejiang and earned a bachelor's degree from Shanghai Jiao Tong University before receiving a doctorate from the University of Wisconsin. Tong returned to China and helped develop the nation's telecommunications infrastructure. He was elected an academician of the Chinese Academy of Engineering in 1997.
