= Jacob Kuwinsuk Gale =

South Sudanese politician

Jacob Kuwinsuk Gale was a South Sudanese politician and member of the Transitional National Legislative Assembly of South Sudan for Yei River State, who was killed in northern Uganda on December 6, 2017. No rebel group claimed responsibility for the murder.
