= Manuel Roa =

Chilean footballer (1929–2017)

Personal information
- Date of birth: 2 April 1929
- Date of death: 18 December 2017 (aged 88)
- Position: Goalkeeper

International career
Years	Team	Apps	(Gls)
- Chile

Manuel Roa (2 April 1929 – 18 December 2017) was a Chilean footballer. He competed in the men's tournament at the 1952 Summer Olympics.
