= Wayne Kendell =

American politician

Member of the Idaho House of Representatives
- In office 1997–2002

Personal details
- Born: November 29, 1925 Aberdeen, Idaho, U.S.
- Died: December 14, 2017 (aged 92) Pocatello, Idaho, U.S.
- Party: Republican

Wayne Kendell (November 29, 1925 – December 14, 2017) was an American politician. He served as a Republican member of the Idaho House of Representatives.

== Life and career ==
Kendell was born in Aberdeen, Idaho.

Kendell served in the Idaho House of Representatives from 1997 to 2002.

Kendell died in December 2017 at the Quinn Meadows Rehabilitation and Care Center in Pocatello, Idaho, at the age of 92.
