= Don Hogan Charles =

American photographer (1938–2017)

- Charles in the late 1960s
- Born: Daniel James Charles; September 9, 1938; New York City, US
- Died: December 15, 2017 (aged 79); New York City, US
- Occupation: Photographer
- Years active: 1964–2007

Don Hogan Charles (born Daniel James Charles; September 9, 1938 – December 15, 2017) was an American photographer. He was the first African-American staff photographer hired by The New York Times. In his four decades there, Charles photographed notable subjects including Coretta Scott King, John Lennon, Malcolm X and Muhammad Ali.

== Life and work ==
Charles was born on September 9, 1938, in New York City, to James Charles and Elizabeth Ann Hogan who were immigrants from the Caribbean. He attended George Washington High School in Manhattan and went on to study engineering at City College of New York before dropping out to pursue photography.

In 1964, after leaving City College, Charles joined The New York Times and remained there for 43 years, until he retired in 2007.

Before joining The Times he worked as a freelance photographer. Charles's freelance work appeared in major international publications such as Der Spiegel and Paris Match. His commercial clients included Bill Blass, Oscar de la Renta, Pan American World Airways, and Eastern Air Lines.

Charles' often devoted his attention in capturing the neighborhood of Harlem. In Harlem he would photograph the day-to-day life of the busy community.

Charles' work is in the collections of MOMA and the National Museum of African American History and Culture.

Among the iconic photos taken by Charles was one of human rights activist Malcolm X holding an M1 carbine while peering out a window. The photo, which Charles took for Ebony, became emblematic of the determination of Malcolm X to protect his family "by any means necessary".

Charles died on December 15, 2017, in East Harlem, aged 79.

== Notable photographs ==
- USA, New York City, 1964 – Photograph of Malcolm X looking out of the window of his Queens home.
Malcolm X guards his family in an iconic Ebony photo taken by Charles.

== See also ==
- Bibliography of Malcolm X
- Bibliography of Martin Luther King Jr.
