= Norman White (criminologist) =

American criminologist

- Born: Norman Anthony White; February 20, 1953; New York City, U.S.
- Died: December 6, 2017 (aged 64); Belleville, Illinois, U.S.
- Education: Marist College; State University of New York at Albany
- Spouse: Liz White (m. 2017)
- Scientific career
- Fields: Criminology
- Institutions: University of Missouri–St. Louis; Saint Louis University
- Thesis: Getting derailed: Toward a developmental understanding of the relationship between school failure and delinquency (2000)

Norman Anthony White (February 20, 1953 – December 6, 2017) was an American criminologist who taught at Saint Louis University (SLU).

== Early life and education ==
White was born on February 20, 1953, in New York City, where he grew up in public housing in upper Manhattan. He attended Marist College in Poughkeepsie, where he received a bachelor's degree and a Master of Public Administration. He went on to receive another master's degree, followed by a doctorate, from the State University of New York at Albany.

== Academic career ==
White joined the faculty of the University of Missouri–St. Louis in 1997, where he served as an assistant professor of criminology until 2003. In 2004, he joined SLU's faculty as an assistant professor and criminal justice programs director; he also held a position in the university's African-American studies program. His other positions at SLU included associate dean of community engagement in the College for Public Health and Social Justice, as well as associate professor in the School of Social Work.

== Research and activism ==
White was active both as a researcher and as an activist for social justice, and he often combined his work in both fields. Among the projects he led at SLU were the Overground Railroad to Literacy Project and Shut It Down: Closing the School to Prison Pipeline. Through this work, he aimed to support the most vulnerable members of the St. Louis community.

== Personal life and death ==
White married his wife, Liz, in July 2017. He died of a heart attack at his home in Belleville, Illinois, on December 6, 2017.

== Recognition ==
In the spring of 2017, White received the Excellence in Mental Health Award from the St. Louis American Foundation. He was also supposed to receive a leadership award from the Incarnate Word Foundation in the same year, but he died the morning before the ceremony. In 2018, SLU's School of Social Work established the Dr. Norman A. White Lecture series as a tribute to him. The Journal of Criminal Justice also published a special issue in his honor, entitled "The Norman White Special Issue on the Study of Ethnicity and Race in Criminology and Criminal Justice".
