= Noel Punton =

Australian gymnast

- Full name: Alexander Noel Punton
- Born: 23 December 1931
- Died: 11 December 2017 (aged 85) Melbourne

Gymnastics career
- Discipline: Men's artistic gymnastics
- Country represented: Australia

Alexander Noel Punton (23 December 1931 – 11 December 2017) was an Australian gymnast. He competed in eight events at the 1956 Summer Olympics. His daughter is comedy writer and producer, short fiction author, and essayist Anita Punton, whose essay about her father placed second in the 2021 Calibre Essay Prize.
