= Mietek Grocher =

Swedish author and public speaker

- Born: 25 November 1926
- Died: 24 December 2017 (aged 91)

Mietek Grocher (1926–2017), was a Swedish author and public speaker who survived the Holocaust in Poland. Grocher recounted the events in his 1996 memoir Jag överlevde (English translation: I survived).

Grocher was born in 1926 in Warsaw, Poland. As a teenager during World War II he resided with his family in the Warsaw Ghetto. Grocher claims to have survived nine different Nazi concentration camps during World War II including Buchenwald and Majdanek. He also wrote that he survived the Majdanek gas chambers. When he realized he was led to gassing by the guards, he began walking backwards. The SS man guarding the door to the gas chambers was in conversation with another guard and so Grocher escaped unnoticed, to join his father. He was the only member of his family to survive the Final Solution. Since the end of the war Grocher lived in Västerås, Sweden and traveled around Swedish schools giving speeches about the events of the Holocaust. He died in December 2017.

== Controversy ==
In late October 2010 Grocher, Artur Szulc, a Polish-born military historian from Sweden has noted, that aside from perpetuating long-debunked myths about the German attack on Poland, a large part of I survived has been copied verbatim from the book of fiction written in 1961 by Leon Uris and titled Mila 18, including the mention of apparently fictional Nazi officers serving in the General Government during World War II. Several names of German officials in Grocher's book are unknown to history. Szulc contacted Grocher's publishers, but released his own findings in January 2011 when the questions he posed to them were not answered to his satisfaction. Grocher died in December 2017.
