= Lev Venediktov =

Soviet-Ukrainian choral conductor and pedagogue (1924–2017)

Hero of Ukraine People's Artist Lev Venediktov Лев Венедиктов
- Born: Lev Nikolayevich Venediktov; 6 October 1924; Tambov, Soviet Union
- Died: 10 December 2017 (aged 93) Kyiv, Ukraine
- Occupations: Conductor, choirmaster, pedagogue

Lev Nikolayevich Venediktov (Ukrainian: Лев Миколайович Венедиктов; 6 October 1924 – 10 December 2017) was a Soviet and Ukrainian choral conductor and pedagogue. People's Artist of the USSR (1979) and Hero of Ukraine (2004).
