= Nicholas Rayner =

Nicholas Rayner

Nicholas Courtauld Rayner (3 March 1938 – 21 December 2017) was a British Army officer with the 11th Hussars and later jewellery expert and auctioneer. In 1965 he briefly held the record for the Cresta run. He was head of Sotheby's Geneva office and received international publicity when he sold the Duchess of Windsor's jewellery collection there in 1987.

== Selected publications ==
- The jewels of the Duchess of Windsor. Vendome Press in association with Sotheby's, New York, 1987. (With John Culme) ISBN 0865650896
