= Matt Cunningham =

Australian rules footballer

Personal information
- Full name: Matthew Patrick Cunningham
- Born: 28 February 1934
- Died: 2 December 2017 (aged 83)
- Original team: Nar Nar Goon
- Height: 175 cm (5 ft 9 in)
- Weight: 75 kg (165 lb)

Playing career^{1}
Years	Club	Games (Goals)
1956–1957, 1959	Fitzroy	37 (16)
- ^{1} Playing statistics correct to the end of 1959.

Matt Cunningham (28 February 1934 – 2 December 2017) was an Australian rules footballer who played for the Fitzroy Football Club in the Victorian Football League (VFL).
