= Edmon Shehadeh =

Palestinian poet and literary

- إدمون شحادة
- Born: 3 February 1933; Haifa
- Died: 17 December 2017 (aged 84); Nazareth
- Occupations: Poet and literary

Edmon Shehadeh (Arabic: إدمون شحادة) was a Palestinian poet and literary.

== Life ==
Shehadeh was born in Haifa on 3 February 1933. He was the fifth child among 3 brothers and 6 sisters. In 1936 he moved with his family to Nazareth where he completed his life.

He awarded the first prize for theater production in Haifa on 1977, Arabic literature full-time award on 1989 and Shield House of Arab culture for national poets on 1992.

== Death ==
Shehadeh died on 17 December 2017 at the age of 84.
