= Michael Clendenin =

American journalist

- Born: 1934; Indiana, U.S.
- Died: December 12, 2017 (aged 83)
- Occupation: Journalist

Michael Clendenin (1934 – December 12, 2017) was an American journalist. He was the editor of the New York Daily News when it won the Pulitzer Prize for Investigative Reporting in 1974.
