= Wordsworth (disambiguation) =

William Wordsworth (1770–1850) was an English romantic poet.

Wordsworth may also refer to:

== Places ==
- Wordsworth, Saskatchewan, a town in Canada

== People ==
- Wordsworth (rapper), an underground hip-hop artist
- Anthony Wordsworth (born 1989), an English footballer
- Barry Wordsworth (born 1948), a British conductor
- Charles Wordsworth, (1806–1892), bishop, son of Christopher Wordsworth (divine)
- Christopher Wordsworth (divine), (1774–1846), English divine and scholar, brother of William and Dorothy
- Christopher Wordsworth, (1807–1885), Bishop and man of Letters, son of Christopher Wordsworth (divine)
- Dora Wordsworth, (1804–1847), daughter of William
- Dorothy Wordsworth (1771–1855), English poet and diarist, sister of William
- Dame Elizabeth Wordsworth, (1840–1932), founder of Lady Margaret Hall, Oxford and St. Hugh's College, daughter of Christopher Wordsworth
- Favel Wordsworth (1850–1888), American baseball player
- John Wordsworth (scholar), (1805–1839), son of Christopher (divine)
- Jonathan Wordsworth, (1932–2006), academic, great-great-grandson of Christopher Wordsworth (divine)
- John Wordsworth, (1843–1911), Bishop, son of Christopher Wordsworth
- Joshua Wordsworth, engineer, co-founder in 1812 of Taylor, Wordsworth and Co
- Matt Wordsworth (born 1975), Australian journalist and news presenter
- Richard Wordsworth, (1915–1993), actor, great-great-grandson of William Wordsworth
- Robert Wordsworth (1894–1984), British Indian Army officer and Australian politician
- Stephen Wordsworth (born 1955), former British diplomat
- William Christopher Wordsworth (1878–1950), British academic and journalist in India
- William Wordsworth (composer) (1908–1988), an English-born Scottish composer

== Art, entertainment, and media ==
- Wordsworth, a red octopus like puppet from the puppet black comedy television show Wonder Showzen
- Wordsworth, a dog in the animated series Jamie and the Magic Torch
- Wordsworth Editions, British publisher

== See also ==
- Words Worth, a Japanese adult role-playing video game
