= Janet E. Courtney =

Janet Elizabeth Courtney
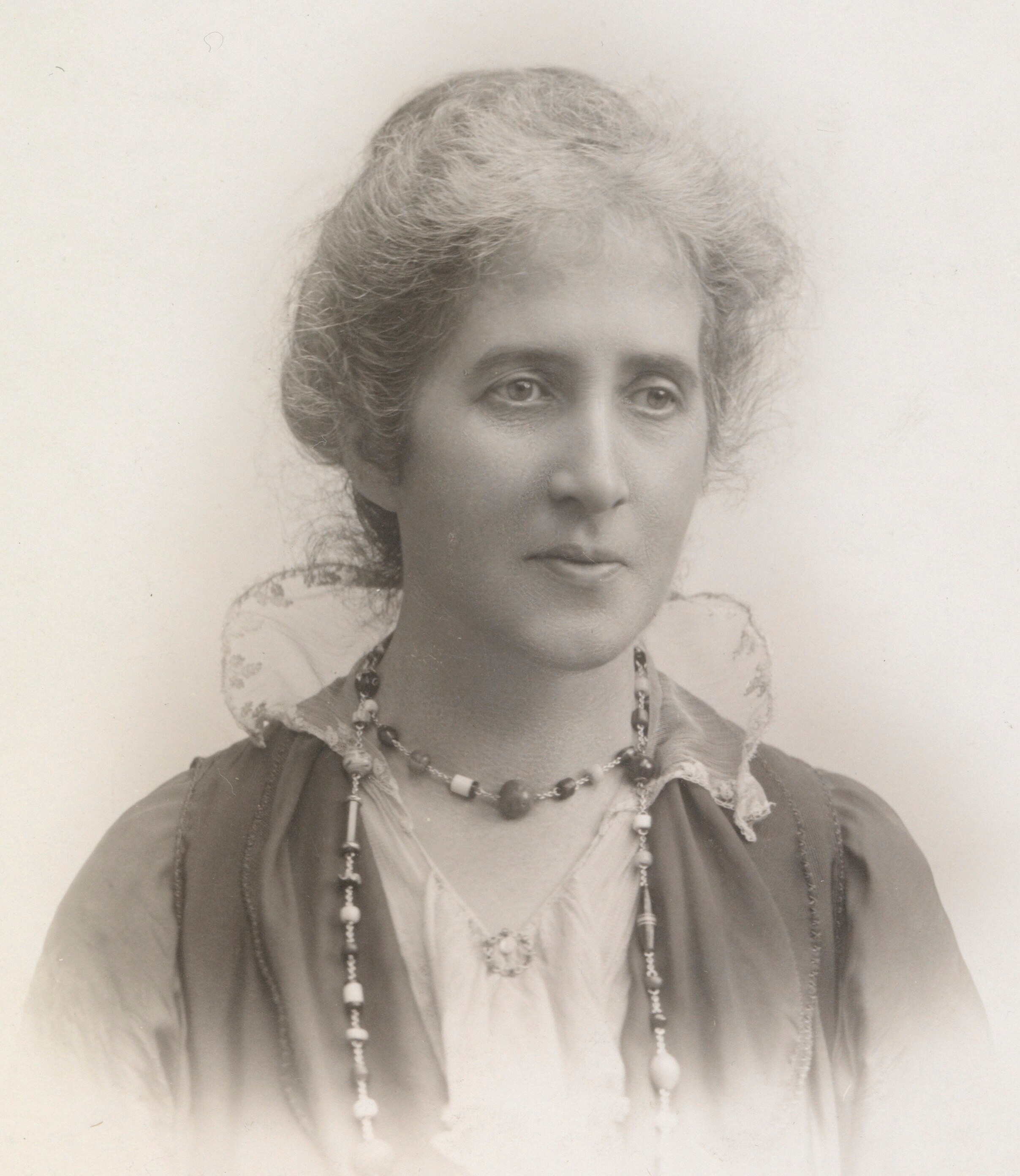
- Photographic portrait of Janet Elizabeth Courtney in about 1917.
- Born: Janet Elizabeth Hogarth; 27 November 1865; Barton-upon-Humber, North Lincolnshire
- Died: 24 September 1954 (aged 88); London
- Occupation(s): Writer, women's rights activist, editor
- Spouse: William Leonard Courtney

Janet Elizabeth Courtney OBE JP (née Hogarth; 27 November 1865 - 24 September 1954) was an English scholar, writer and feminist. Hogarth studied philosophy and languages at Oxford University during the first decade of allowing women to study there. She was a pioneer of expanding employment opportunities in administration and public service for educated middle-class women in the two decades before World War I. Hogarth had an important role in the production of the celebrated eleventh edition of The Encyclopædia Britannica. Though considered to be a feminist for her advocacy of women's opportunities in the workplace, Hogarth actively opposed extending the vote to women.

In 1911 Hogarth married the journalist William Leonard Courtney, who had been one of her tutors at Oxford. Janet Courtney was a published author, including a biography of her late husband and a series of reminiscences detailing her academic and working life.

== Biography ==
=== Early years ===
Janet Elizabeth Hogarth was born on 27 November 1865 at Barton-upon-Humber in North Lincolnshire, the second daughter of the Anglican minister Rev. George Hogarth and his wife Jane Elizabeth (née Uppleby). She was one of thirteen children (of whom only eight survived to maturity). Janet "spent her childhood in a quiet vicarage in an out-of-the-way Lincolnshire town". Her older brother was the archaeologist David George Hogarth.

=== Oxford University ===
Hogarth entered Lady Margaret Hall at Oxford University in 1885, aged nineteen. Janet's father permitted her to go to Oxford University "because of the reassuring fact" that Elizabeth Wordsworth, the first principal of Lady Margaret Hall was "the daughter of one bishop and the sister of another". Hogarth later wrote that living at Lady Margaret Hall provided her with "the very first room I ever had to myself [which] made my first year at Oxford a joy, which only those who grow up in large families and cramped houses can possibly appreciate".

Hogarth undertook the Literae Humaniores course, known as 'the greats', which consisted of Greek and Roman history, language studies and philosophy. At that time the study of philosophy was exclusively a male preserve, so she needed special permission to attend some of the men's lecture courses. Female undergraduate students were required to have a chaperone at lectures or other occasions when they visited a men's college. The chaperones were usually volunteers from a cohort of the wives and sisters of heads of college and professors. Since the 1870s, when married Fellows were allowed at Oxford, their wives tended to "be serious-minded and to constitute themselves the friends and promoters of women's education".

The Oxford Vice-Chancellor, Benjamin Jowett, agreed to allow Hogarth to join classes at Balliol College, where she attended lectures given by Richard Lewis Nettleship. At the lectures Hogarth was required to sit at the high table of the hall, away from the audience of male undergraduates. She was occasionally accompanied by Elizabeth Wordsworth as a chaperone, "who audibly dissented from the lecturer". Following the Nettleship lectures, New College permitted her to attend the lectures on Plato given by William Leonard Courtney, who supported her studies by interceding with other lecturers on her behalf.

Courtney met Gertrude Bell at Oxford in April 1886 and the two young women became close friends. After her final examinations in 1888 Hogarth graduated in philosophy, German and Greek, gaining a first-class pass in the Literae Humaniores course.

=== Employment ===
After completing her studies at Oxford, Hogarth found a part-time position as a philosophy teacher at Cheltenham Ladies' College, a boarding and day school for girls at Cheltenham in Gloucestershire. However, she found that she was not suited to teaching. Hogarth later wrote that the "openings afforded by modern business" promised more to college-trained women than working within the education system. She believed that teaching had the tendency of isolating women from "learning of suitable vacancies" in other vocations.

In 1892 Hogarth was appointed to a temporary position as a "chief clerk" on the Royal Commission on Labour, a wide-ranging enquiry investigating labour questions in Britain and its colonies, the United States and European countries. She was appointed under a process by which the secretary to the Royal Commission, Geoffrey Drage, "was trying experiments with women clerks". At that time Hogarth was living with her sister "in one of the first residential chambers catering for professional women". Hogarth was responsible for the general supervision of the women clerks and paid a weekly salary of three pounds, which was the equivalent to that of a male clerk, though not one with Hogarth's university qualifications and language skills. In later years she wrote of clerical work as "a soul-destroying avocation, from which any woman, let alone a woman of higher education, might well pray to be delivered".

In 1893 when the Bank of England decided to employ women, the directors contacted other institutions that had some experience with the novelty. One such workplace was the Royal Commission of Labour, at that time the only Government institution with women university graduates on staff. After consideration the bank directors chose two women clerks who had worked for the Royal Commission, Janet Hogarth and Miss Elsee (who had been educated at Girton College at the University of Cambridge and graduated with honours in the History Tripos). As Hogarth later wrote: "women in ordinary banks were unheard of, and their introduction into the Bank of England, of all places, caused a mild sensation". The two women were initially given the task of counting and sorting returned banknotes, work formerly done by young apprentice male clerks. They were found temporary accommodation in the Sub-Cashier's room which was divided by a wooden screen to keep the male and female clerks separated. Later, as more women were employed, a new department was built for them. By April 1894 Hogarth, as the first superintendent of the women clerks at the Bank of England, was earning an annual salary of £157, probably "one of the best paid women in London" at that time. She remained at the bank for more than a decade. During this period also undertook sub-editing work for The Fortnightly Review, which by then was being edited by her former Oxford tutor, W. L. Courtney. Hogarth had been writing intermittently for periodicals since her years as an undergraduate. During her time with the Bank of England, as she later wrote, she was "tempted... to throw prudence to the winds and adventure myself in the perilous paths of journalism", but was discouraged after making approaches to editors. After more than ten years at the Bank of England Hogarth realised it was time to make a change, from a job that had become "unbearably tedious", after she began to fantasise that "a bomb would explode and wreck the Bank".

In early 1906 Janet Hogarth was employed as the chief librarian of The Times Book Club, in charge of fifteen librarians. The Book Club had been established in September 1905 in premises in Bond Street under the supervision of the advertising manager of The Times, Horace Everett Hooper. It was designed to increase circulation of the newspaper by enticing annual subscribers with access to "a first-rate circulating library", making available a wide selection of books that could be borrowed for free or purchased at a significant discount. The Book Club proved to be popular with the public and in May 1906 it relocated to larger premises in Oxford Street. However, the book club concept was opposed by the Publishers' Association, leading to a bitter war of words between the parties. In May 1908 the publisher John Murray won a libel suit against The Times after he was accused in print of "simple extortion". By that stage Baron Northcliffe had acquired a controlling interest in The Times and sought a compromise with the Publishers' Association. Hooper was replaced as Book Club manager, and subsequently resigned from The Times. He was replaced by Kennedy Jones who proceeded to instigate changes acceptable to the publishers (eventually leading to the winding up of the Book Club). Jones ordered the staff to wear uniforms and instituted a policy of preventing the availability of books of which he did not approve. Hogarth responded to these restrictions by resigning.

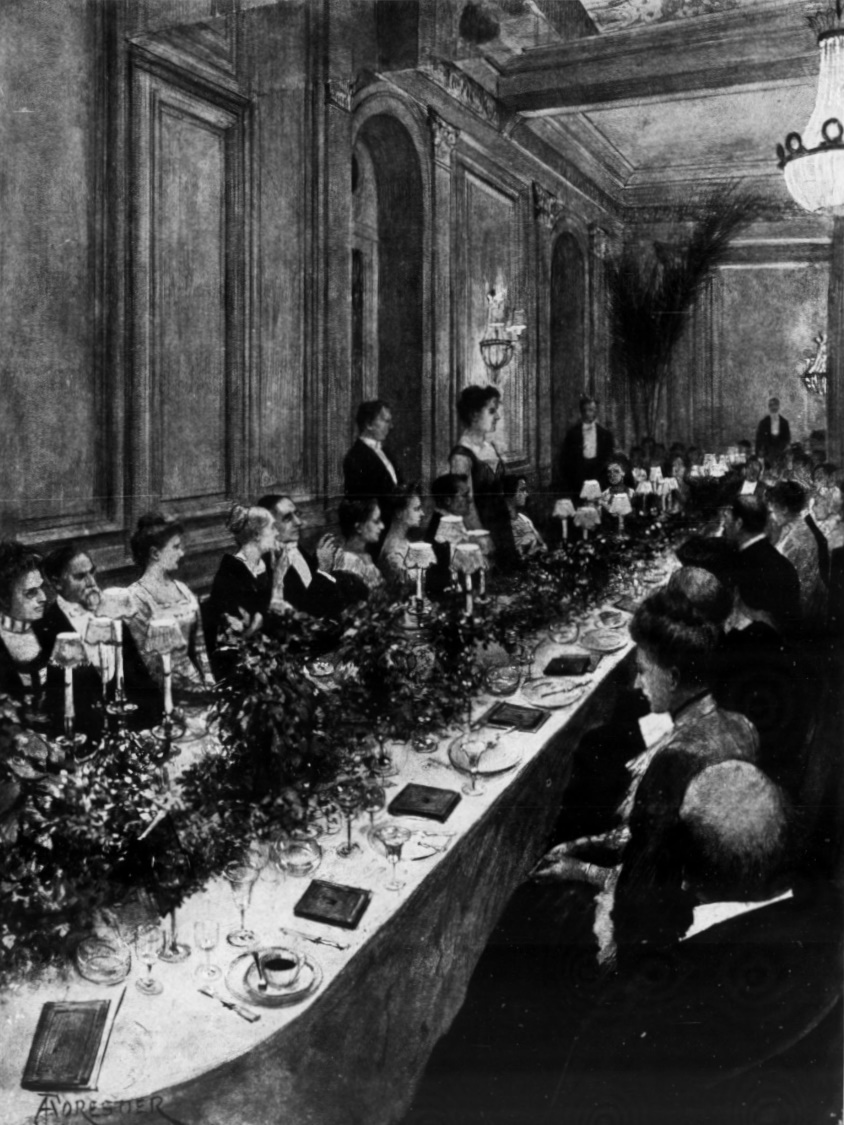
Janet Hogarth speaking at the Encyclopædia Britannica dinner to women contributors, replying to the toast "The work of women" (illustration, published in The Illustrated London News, 24 December 1910).

In 1909 Hogarth shifted from the Book Club to the offices of The Encyclopædia Britannica in High Holborn in central London, where she was placed in charge of the female indexers for the eleventh edition. In addition to her supervision of the indexing, Hogarth also wrote and edited hundreds of unsigned articles for the finished work. In December 1910 one of four dinners to celebrate the completion of the eleventh edition was held at the Savoy Hotel in honour of the women contributors to the encyclopædia. The keynote speech, replying to the toast "The work of women", was given by Janet Hogarth, during which she declared that The Encyclopædia Britannica "has given women the chance to demonstrate their rightful place in the learned world". The eleventh edition of The Encyclopædia Britannica was published during 1910 and 1911, consisting of 28 volumes plus an index volume.

As observed by the historian Gillian Thomas, Hogarth's education "enabled her to develop an independent professional life, which, in turn, gave her a personal autonomy and an enlarged private world" unimaginable in the context of the home life in which she was raised.

Prior to the enactment of the 1918 legislation in Britain extending the vote to women aged over 30, Janet Hogarth Courtney and her friend Gertrude Bell had been opposed to the extension of suffrage to women. The Women's National Anti-Suffrage League (WNASL) was launched in July 1908 to counter a growing political acceptance of the inevitability of female enfranchisement. Both Hogarth and Bell served on the executive of the organisation, with Bell becoming its first secretary. In her later years Janet Hogarth Courtney maintained a dismissive attitude to the female suffrage. In 1931 she wrote that during her "anti-Suffrage days... many of us feared that Pankhurst militancy was going to wreck most of what professional women had won". in 1933 she described the female vote as "a double-edged weapon of limited usefulness", involving women in "the strife" of political parties, "yet gave them only a very small percentage of representatives in Parliament".

=== Marriage ===
On 17 July 1911 Hogarth married William Leonard Courtney, editor of The Fortnightly Review and drama and literary critic of The Daily Telegraph. She had been taught by Courtney at Oxford and later worked for him at The Fortnightly Review. William Courtney's first wife had died in May 1907 "after a long and distressing illness".

From 1913 Janet Courtney served as a member of the executive committee of the Carnegie United Kingdom Trust.

By 1913 Janet Courtney was first assistant to Hugh Chisholm, the editor of The Encyclopædia Britannica. In that year the single volume Britannica Year Book was published. In 1914 a project to produce a "junior Britannica" was commenced. Courtney and her staff were assigned to produce a sample volume of articles from the encyclopedia proper, shortened and rewritten in plainer language and well illustrated with photographs and drawings. Courtney's work on The Encyclopædia Britannica was interrupted by the outbreak of World War I in July 1914. The plans to produce a children's encyclopedia were abandoned in 1915.

In 1916 and 1917 Janet Courtney was employed as an adviser on staff welfare at the Ministry of Munitions. Courtney was made an officer of the Order of the British Empire (OBE) on 24 August 1917. She was invested with the award by the King on 27 September 1917. She was also appointed as a Justice of the Peace.

Janet and William Courtney collaborated in the writing of Pillars of Empire, published in 1918. The book, described as "biographical sketches of men who have helped to make the British Empire", included illustrations by Clive Gardiner.

In early 1920 Sears, Roebuck and Company purchased Encyclopædia Britannica and retained Horace Hooper as the publisher. Hooper proposed that a three-volume supplement to the eleventh edition be prepared, to include a history of the recent war, which was agreed to by the new owners. He met with Hugh Chisholm, who had been working at The Times during the war, and offered him the editorship of the supplement. Chisholm accepted and hired Janet Courtney as his first assistant. Courtney was the author of the major articles 'Women' and 'Women Police' in the three-volume supplement of the encyclopedia (known as the twelfth edition), published in 1921-1922.

In 1926 Courtney's memoir, Recollected in Tranquility was published. The book was her personal account "of the time when women were beginning to invade all kinds of new spheres of activity – by one who, although an anti-suffragist, was one of the pioneers".

Janet's husband, William Courtney, died on 1 November 1928 in London.

=== Later years ===
Janet Courtney wrote a biography of her late husband, The Making of an Editor: W. L. Courtney, 1850-1928, published in 1930. She was the author of a number of books of reminiscences detailing her working life and years at Oxford University.

Janet Elizabeth Hogarth Courtney died on 24 September 1954 in London, aged 88.

== Written works ==
As Janet Hogarth

- The Modern French Drama: Seven essays (1898), translated by J. E. Hogarth, London: Chapman & Hall Ltd.
- The Woman's Library (1903) In Vol. 1. "Education and professions: The higher education of women"

As Janet E. Courtney

- Pillars of Empire: Studies and Impressions (with W. L. Courtney) (1918), London: Jarrolds Publishers Ltd.
- Freethinkers of the Nineteenth Century (1920), London: Chapman & Hall Ltd.
- Recollected in Tranquility (1926), London: William Heinemann Ltd.
- The Making of an Editor: W. L. Courtney, 1850-1928 (1930), London: Macmillan & Co. (a biography of her husband).
- An Oxford Portrait Gallery (1931), London: Chapman & Hall Ltd.
- Countrywomen in Council: The English and Scottish Women's Institutes with Chapters on the Movement in the Dominions and on Townswomen's Guilds (1933), Oxford: Oxford University Press.
- The Adventurous Thirties: A Chapter in the Women's Movement (1933), Oxford: Oxford University Press (Prominent women of the 1830s)
- The Women of My Time (1934), London: Lovat Dickson Ltd.
- Simple Annals (1936)
