= Christopher Wordsworth (disambiguation) =

Christopher Wordsworth may refer to:

- Christopher Wordsworth (divine) (1774–1846), English divine and scholar
- Christopher Wordsworth (1807–1885), English bishop in the Anglican Church and intellectual, son of the above
- Christopher Wordsworth (liturgiologist) (1848–1938), English liturgiologist and author, son of the above
