= John Wordsworth (scholar) =

English classical scholar

- Born: 1 July 1805
- Died: 31 December 1839 (aged 34)
- Education: Woodford, Essex; Winchester College
- Occupation: Scholar
- Parent(s): Christopher Wordsworth & Priscilla Lloyd
- Relatives: Charles Wordsworth (brother); Christopher Wordsworth (brother)

John Wordsworth (1 July 1805 – 31 December 1839) was an English classical scholar.

== Life ==
He was born at Lambeth on 1 July 1805, the son of Christopher Wordsworth and nephew of William Wordsworth. He was educated at a school at Woodford, Essex, kept by Dr. Holt Okes (1816−20), and at Winchester College (1820−4).

In October 1824 he entered Trinity College, Cambridge. His university career was distinguished. In 1825 he obtained the Bell scholarship, in 1826 a scholarship at his own college, and was second for the Porson Prize; in 1827 he obtained it. In 1828 he proceeded to the B.A. degree, but was disqualified for classical honours through distaste for mathematics. In 1830 he was elected fellow of his college.

He resided at Cambridge till 1833, occupying himself with literary pursuits. During this period he contributed to the first number of the Philological Museum a review of James Scholefield's Æschylus. In 1833 he visited France, Switzerland, and Italy. At Florence he collated the Medicean manuscript of Æschylus, with a view to a new edition. Some use was made of his material by John Conington in his edition of the Choephoroi. In 1834 he was appointed a classical lecturer in Trinity College, and undertook to edit Richard Bentley's Correspondence (afterwards completed by his brother Christopher Wordsworth, bishop of Lincoln). He also made large collections for a classical dictionary. In 1837 he was ordained deacon, and priest shortly afterwards.

At about the same time his health began to fail; he resigned his lectureship, and looked for easier work. From this step he was dissuaded, and he remained at Cambridge till his death on 31 December 1839. He was buried in the antechapel of the college, where a monument to him was placed by subscription. The bust was executed by Henry Weekes, under Francis Leggatt Chantrey's supervision. Most of his collections came into the possession of his nephew John Wordsworth, the bishop of Salisbury.
