= Olive Fraser =

Scottish poet (1909–1977)

- a sketch of her from her papers
- Born: 20 January 1909; Aberdeen
- Died: 9 December 1977 (aged 68); Aberdeen
- Education: University of Aberdeen

Olive Fraser (20 January 1909 – 9 December 1977) was a Scottish poet born in Aberdeen. Both her parents emigrated to Australia within a year of her birth, leaving Olive behind with her great-aunt in Nairn. She won the Calder Prize for English verse while studying English at the University of Aberdeen, and the Chancellor's Medal for English Verse at University of Cambridge in 1935, but did not complete her studies at Cambridge for health reasons.

Most of her works were published posthumously.

== Education ==
- Millbank School, Nairn
- Rose's Academical Institution, Nairn
- King's College, Aberdeen (graduated 1930)
- Girton College, Cambridge (did not graduate due to ill health)

== Poetry ==
The Scottish Poetry Library describes Fraser's style as follows:

"... there was a never-extinguished sadness in Fraser’s life: the knowledge that she was an unwanted child. Her mother was cold to her, and her father and his family never recognised her (both parents returned from Australia, but lived apart). All this was reflected in her writing throughout her life, in poems of heartbreaking poignancy ..."

Towards the end of her life, Fraser's health improved significantly following successful treatment for hypothyroidism, apparently a significant factor in her earlier depression; in this period which she referred to as 'wonderful years' she "regained energy, and was able to write again [...] she visited friends, went on holidays and continued to produce striking poetry until her death in 1977".

== Notable works ==
- Benighted in the Foothills of the Cairngorms: January
- The Adder of Quinag
- The Solitaires
- The Wrong Music (collection of Fraser's works, published posthumously, edited by Helena Mennie Shire)
- The Pure Account: the poems of Olive Fraser
