= Chancellor's Gold Medal =

Poetry prize at the University of Cambridge

The Chancellor's Gold Medal is annual award for poetry open to undergraduates at the University of Cambridge, paralleling Oxford University's Newdigate Prize. It was first presented by Prince William Frederick, Duke of Gloucester and Edinburgh during his time as Chancellor of the University of Cambridge. In the mid-19th century, the topic for each year was sent out at the end of Michaelmas Term, with a requirement that entries were submitted by 31 March of the following year. A second requirement is and has been that poems must be submitted anonymously. Over the last few decades the system of set topics has been abandoned.

The winner of the medal would have the honour of reading their poem aloud in the Senate House on Commencement Day. The prize was first awarded in 1813 to George Waddington of Trinity College. The early lists of winners show a considerable overlap with the list of Senior Wranglers.

This literary prize continues to exist today under the name of Chancellor's Medal for an English Poem. Intermittently it was also known as the Chancellor's Medal for (an) English Verse.

The prize takes the shape of not so much a medal, but of a rather large coin or medallion. In modern times the medallion is decked with a representation of the King on the front and a poetical figure on the back.

The prize has not been bestowed upon a young poet in every academic year since 1813. Where available information has been provided as to which college of the university the particular student belonged.

Chancellor's Medals may also be awarded to undergraduates for academic distinction in Classics or English Law.

== Partial list of recipients ==
- 1813 George Waddington, Trinity, Columbus
- 1814 William Whewell, Trinity, Boadicea
- 1815 Edward Smirke, St. John's, Wallace
- 1816 Hamilton Sydney Beresford, Clare, Mahomet
- 1817 Chauncy Hare Townshend, Trinity Hall, Jerusalem
- 1818 Charles Edward Long, Trinity, Imperial and Papal Rome
- 1819 Thomas Babington Macaulay, 1st Baron Macaulay, Trinity, Pompeii
- 1820 George Irving Scott, Trinity, Waterloo
- 1821 Thomas Babington Macaulay, 1st Baron Macaulay, Trinity, Evening
- 1822 John Henry Bright, St. John's, Palmyra
- 1823 Winthrop Mackworth Praed, Trinity, Australasia
- 1824 Winthrop Mackworth Praed, Trinity, Athens
- 1825 Edward Bulwer-Lytton, 1st Baron Lytton, Trinity, Sculpture
- 1826 Joseph Sumner Brockhurst, St John's, Venice (later headmaster of Camberwell Collegiate School)
- 1827 Christopher Wordsworth, Trinity, The Druids
- 1828 Christopher Wordsworth, Trinity, Invasion of Russia by Napoleon Boneparte
- 1829 Alfred Tennyson, 1st Baron Tennyson, Trinity, Timbuctoo
- 1830 William Chapman Kinglake, Trinity, Byzantium
- 1831 George Stovin Venables, Jesus, Attempts to find a North West Passage
- 1832 William Chapman Kinglake, Trinity, The Taking of Jerusalem in the First Crusade
- 1833 Clement Berkley Hue, Trinity, Delphi
- 1842 Henry James Sumner Maine, Pembroke, Birth of the Prince of Wales
- 1844 Edward Henry Bickersteth, Trinity, The Tower of London
- 1845 Edward Henry Bickersteth, Trinity, Caubul
- 1846 Edward Henry Bickersteth, Trinity, Caesar's Invasion of Britain
- 1852 Frederic William Farrar, Trinity, The Arctic Regions
- 1873 Arthur Woollgar Verrall, Trinity
- 1899 Arthur Cecil Pigou, King's,
- 1900 Frank Sidgwick, Trinity, ″Khartoum″
- 1901 George Dean Raffles Tucker, Magdalene
- 1902 Giles Lytton Strachey, Trinity, "Ely"
- 1903 Not awarded
- 1904 Robert Quirk, Kings
- 1905 Arthur Conway Osborne Morgan, Trinity
- 1906 Charles Mendell Kohan, Trinity
- 1907 Donald Welldon Corrie, King's
- 1908 George Geoffrey Gilbert Butler, Trinity
- 1909 Dennis Holme Robertson, Trinity
- 1910 Dennis Holme Robertson, Trinity
- 1911 Dennis Holme Robertson, Trinity
- 1912 Not awarded
- 1913 Not awarded
- 1914 Donald Frederick Goold Johnson, Emmanuel
- 1915 Philip Carrington, Selwyn
- 1916 Not awarded
- 1917 Harold Obbard Lee, Jesus
- 1918 Hugh l'Anson Fausset, Corpus
- 1919 Frederick Francis Thomas Pinto, Non-Collegiate
- 1920 Colin Hercules Mackenzie, King's
- 1921 Cecil Roy Leonard Falcy, Queens', Death of Napoleon
- 1922 Montague Maurice Simmons, Queens
- 1923 David William Allun Llewellyn, St John's, St Francis of Assiss
- 1924 Edward Falaise Upward, Corpus Christi, Buddha
- 1925 Henry Hugh Thomas, Sidney Sussex, Stonehenge
- 1926 Alan Trevor Oldham, Emmanuel, Gallipoli
- 1927 Frederik John Norton also Frederik Norton, Pembroke, Orestes
- 1928 Kenneth Harold Ellis, Trinity, Proserpine
- 1929 Elsie Elizabeth Phare later Elsie Duncan-Jones, Newnham, The Bridge (first female recipient
- 1931 Robert Gittings also Robert William Victor Gittings, Jesus, The Roman Road
- 1934 Frederick William Clayton, King's, The English Countryside
- 1935 Olive Fraser, Girton, The Vikings (F)
- 1936 Terence Tiller also Terence Rogers Tiller, Jesus, Egypt
- 1937 Christopher Thomas Gandy, King's, The Thames
- 1938 John Darrel Boyd, King's, A Great Man
- 1939 Reginald Arthur Burrows, St Catherine's, Fire
- 1942 Irene Josephine Blanche Snatt, Girton, A Londoner (F)
- 1948 George James Moor, Downing, The Year's to Come
- 1949 Alan John Maurice Bird, Selwyn, Speed
- 1953 Alasdair Eoin Aston, Pembroke, Gloriana Rediviva
- 1964 Howard Brenton, St Catherine's
- 1966 William Paul Huw Merchant, Emmanuel
- 1967 Clive Wilmer, King's
- 1969 Alexander John Howard Martin, Jesus
- 1970 Elliot Alexander Grant, Christ's
- 1974 John Wilkinson also John Lawton Wilkinson, Jesus
- 1976 Charles Ellis Leftwich, St John's, Cadenzas
- 1977 David Colles Lloyd, King's, Ecologies
- 1978 Aidan Semmens, Trinity
- 1979 Jacqueline Osherow, Trinity (F)
- 1980 Michael Thomas Hutchinson, Trinity
- 1982 Alice Goodman also Alice Abigail Goodman, Girton, Four Poems (F)
- 1984 James William Noggle, Fitzwilliam, A painting of the garden
- 1985 Jean Hanff Korelitz, Clare, The Sounds from the Stairs and other poems (F)
- 1988 Joanne Marion Wiess, St. Edmund's, Untitled Poem (F)
- 1989 Simon James Alderson, Trinity, Memory
- 1992 Nicoletta Fotinos also N. I. Fotinos, Churchill, Pergamon (first non-native speaker recipient), (F)
- 1994 Keith Malcolm Sands, Jesus, Axis
- 1997 Keston Sutherland also Keston M. Sutherland, Hate's clitoris
- 2006 Benjamin Morris, Sonata in orange
