= William Whewell =

English polymath (1794–1866)

The Reverend William Whewell FRS FGS FRSE
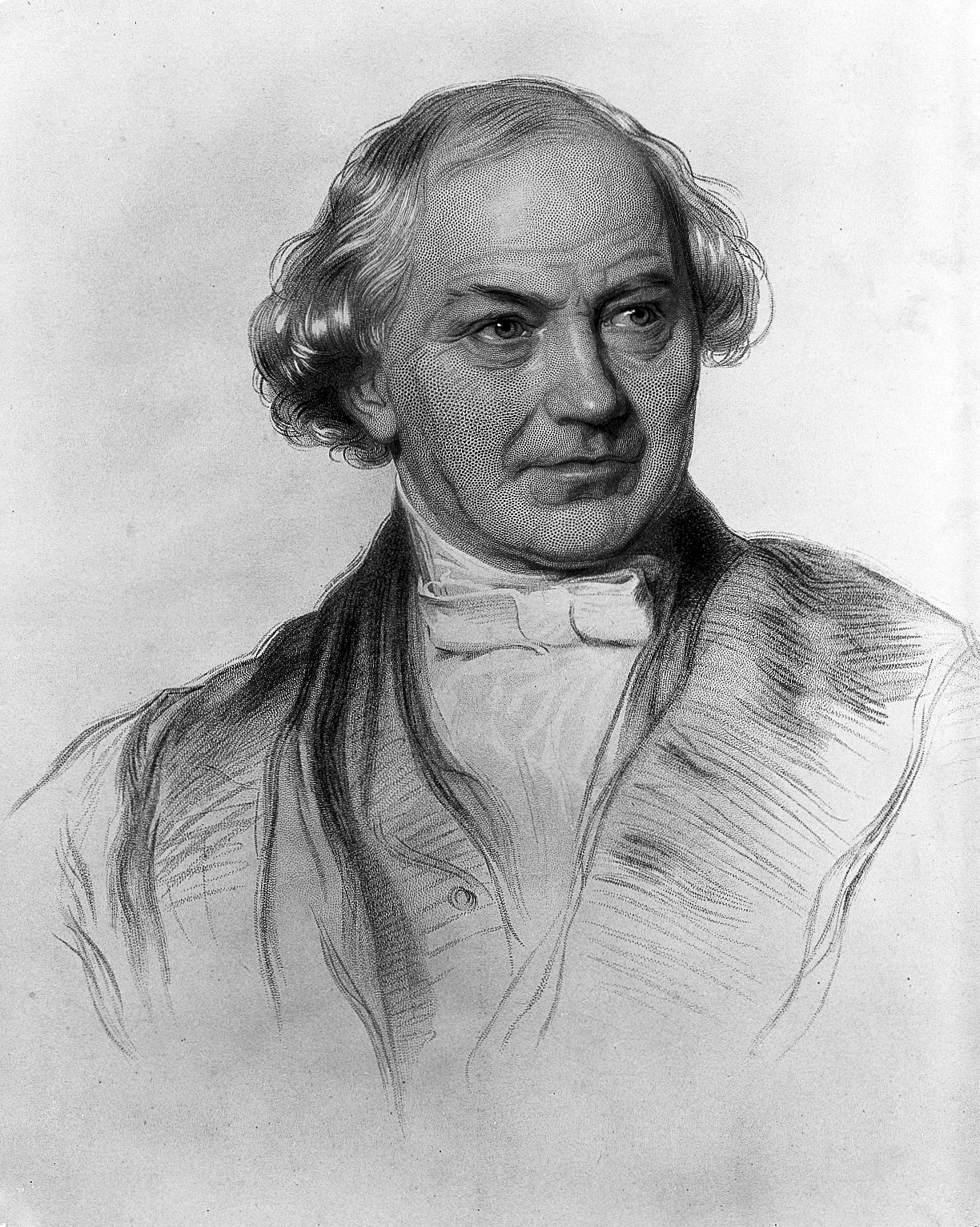

27th Master of Trinity College, Cambridge
- In office 1841–1866
- Preceded by: Christopher Wordsworth
- Succeeded by: William Hepworth Thompson

Personal details
- Born: 24 May 1794 Lancaster, England
- Died: 6 March 1866 (aged 71) Cambridge, England
- Spouses: Cordelia Marshall (m. 1841; died 1855) Everina Ellis (m. 1858; died 1865)
- Education: University of Cambridge; Trinity College
- Known for: Coining the terms scientist (1833) and physicist (1840); Coining the terms anode and cathode (1834)
- Awards: Chancellor's Gold Medal (1814); Smith's Prize (1816); Royal Medal (1837)

Academic background
- Academic advisor: John Gough

Academic work
- Discipline: Mathematics; philosophy; science; theology
- Institutions: University of Cambridge (1817–1866)
- Notable students: Augustus De Morgan
- Main interests: History of science; poetry

William Whewell (/ˈhjuːəl/ HEW-əl; 24 May 1794 – 6 March 1866) was an English polymath. He was Master of Trinity College, Cambridge. In his time as a student there, he achieved distinction in both poetry and mathematics.

The breadth of Whewell's endeavours is his most remarkable feature. In a time of increasing specialisation, Whewell belonged in an earlier era when natural philosophers investigated widely. He published work in mechanics, physics, geology, astronomy, and economics, while also composing poetry, writing a Bridgewater Treatise, translating the works of Goethe, and writing sermons and theological tracts. In mathematics, Whewell introduced what is now called the Whewell equation, defining the shape of a curve without reference to an arbitrarily chosen coordinate system. He also organized thousands of volunteers internationally to study ocean tides, in what is now considered one of the first citizen science projects. He received the Royal Medal for this work in 1837.

One of Whewell's greatest gifts to science was his wordsmithing. He corresponded with many in his field and helped them come up with neologisms for their discoveries. Whewell coined, among other terms, scientist, physicist, linguistics, consilience, catastrophism, uniformitarianism, and astigmatism; he suggested to Michael Faraday the terms electrode, ion, dielectric, anode, and cathode.

== Early life, education and marriages ==
Whewell was born in Lancaster, the son of John Whewell and his wife, Elizabeth Bennison. His father was a master carpenter, and wished him to follow his trade, but William's success in mathematics at Lancaster Royal Grammar School and Heversham grammar school won him an exhibition (a type of scholarship) at Trinity College, Cambridge in 1812. He was the eldest of seven children, having three brothers and three sisters born after him. Two of the brothers died as infants while the third died in 1812. Two of his sisters married; he corresponded with them in his career as a student and then a professor. His mother died in 1807, when Whewell was 13 years old. His father died in 1816, the year Whewell received his bachelor's degree at Trinity College, but before his most significant professional accomplishments.

Whewell married, firstly, in 1841, Cordelia Marshall, daughter of John Marshall. Within days of his marriage, Whewell was recommended to be master of Trinity College in Cambridge, following Christopher Wordsworth. Cordelia died in 1855. In 1858, he married again, to Everina Frances (née Ellis), sister of Robert Leslie Ellis and widow of Sir Gilbert Affleck, 5th Baronet. She died in 1865. He had no children.

== Career ==
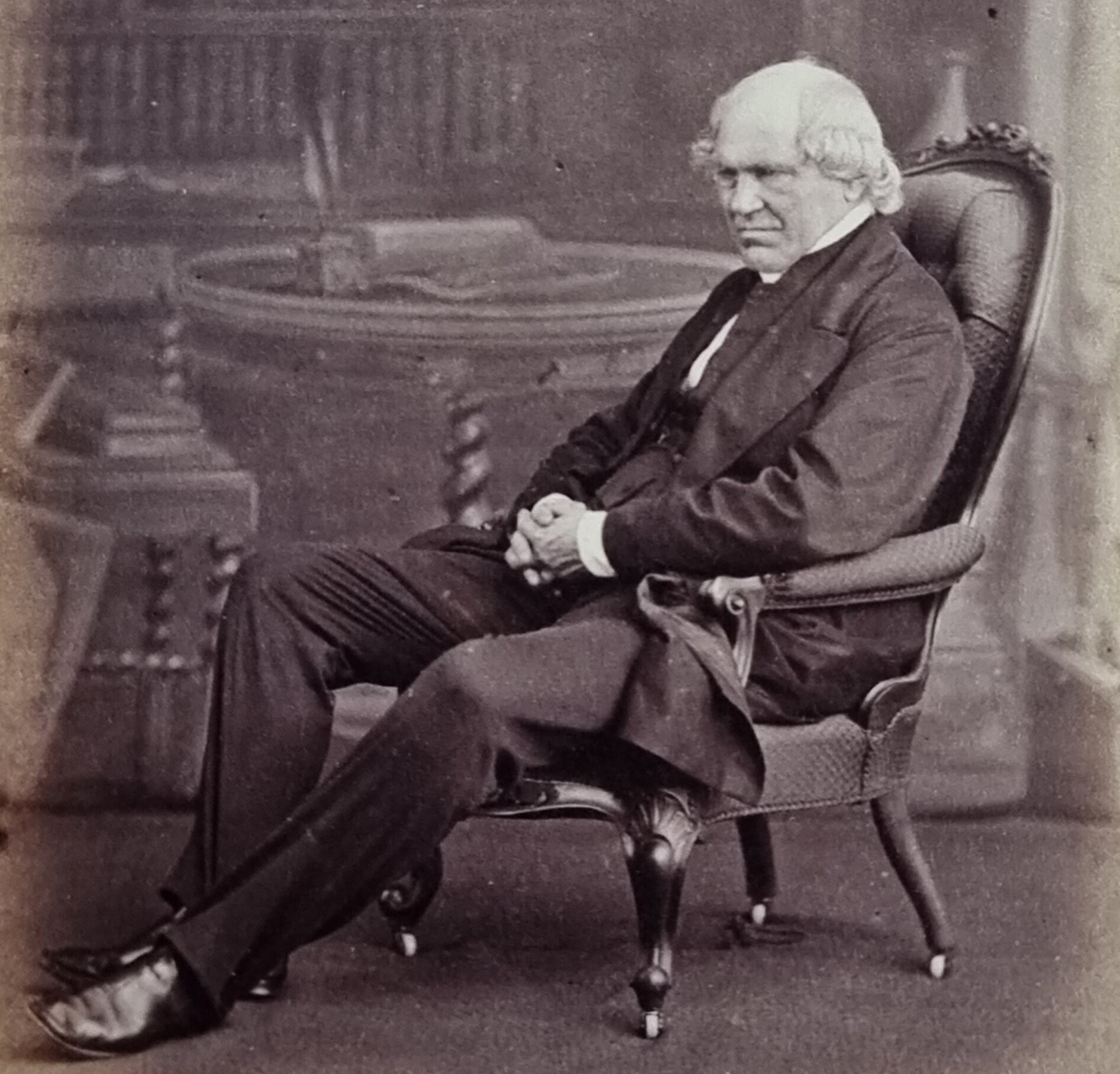
Portrait of William Whewell, c. 1863

In 1814, he was awarded the Chancellor's Gold Medal for poetry. He was Second Wrangler in 1816, President of the Cambridge Union Society in 1817, became fellow and tutor of his college.

He was professor of mineralogy from 1828 to 1832 and Knightbridge Professor of Philosophy (then called "moral theology and casuistical divinity") from 1838 to 1855. During the years as professor of philosophy, in 1841, Whewell succeeded Christopher Wordsworth as master.

Whewell influenced the syllabus of the Mathematical Tripos at Cambridge, which undergraduates studied. He was a proponent of 'mixed mathematics': applied mathematics, descriptive geometry and mathematical physics, in contrast with pure mathematics. Under Whewell, analytic topics such as elliptical integrals were replaced by physical studies of electricity, heat and magnetism. He believed an intuitive geometrical understanding of mathematics, based on Euclid and Newton, was most appropriate.

== Death and legacy ==
Whewell died in Cambridge in 1866 as a result of a fall from his horse. He was buried in the chapel of Trinity College, Cambridge, whilst his wives are buried together in the Mill Road Cemetery, Cambridge. A window dedicated to Lady Affleck, his second wife, was installed in her memory in the chancel of All Saints' Church, Cambridge and made by Morris & Co.

A list of his writings was prepared after his death by Isaac Todhunter in two volumes, the first being an index of the names of persons with whom Whewell corresponded. Another book was published five years later, as a biography of Whewell's life interspersed with his letters to his father, his sisters, and other correspondence, written and compiled by his niece by marriage, Janet Mary Douglas, called Mrs Stair Douglas on the book's title page. These books are available online in their entirety as part of the Internet Archive.

== Endeavours ==
=== History and development of science ===
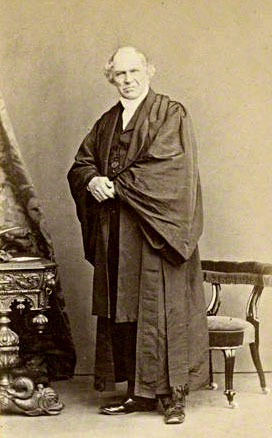
William Whewell, c. 1860s

In 1826 and 1828, Whewell was engaged with George Airy in conducting experiments in Dolcoath mine in Cornwall, in order to determine the density of the earth. Their united labours were unsuccessful, and Whewell did little more in the way of experimental science. He was the author, however, of an Essay on Mineralogical Classification, published in 1828, and carried out extensive work on the tides.

When Whewell started his work on tides, there was a theory explaining the forces causing the tides, based on the work of Newton, Bernoulli, and Laplace. But this explained the forces, not how tides actually propagated in oceans bounded by continents. There was a series of tidal observations for a few ports, such as London and Liverpool, which allowed tide tables to be produced for these ports. However, the methods used to create such tables, and in some cases the observations, were closely guarded trade secrets. John Lubbock, a former student of Whewell's, had analysed the available historic data (covering up to 25 years) for several ports to allow tables to be generated on a theoretical basis, publishing the methodology. This work was supported by Francis Beaufort, Hydrographer of the Navy, and contributed to the publication of the Admiralty Tide Tables starting in 1833.

Whewell built on Lubbock's work to develop an understanding of tidal patterns around the world that could be used to generate predictions for many locations without the need for long series of tidal observations at each port. This required extensive new observations, initially obtained through an informal network, and later through formal projects enabled by Beaufort at the Admiralty. In the first of these, in June 1834, every Coast Guard station in the United Kingdom recorded the tides every fifteen minutes for two weeks. The second, in June 1835, was an international collaboration, involving Admiralty Surveyors, other Royal Navy and British observers, as well as those from the United States, France, Spain, Portugal, Belgium, Denmark, Norway, and the Netherlands. Islands, such as the Channel Islands, were particularly interesting, adding important detail of the progress of the tides through the ocean. The Admiralty also provided the resources for data analysis, and J.F. Dessiou, an expert calculator on the Admiralty staff, was in charge of the calculations.

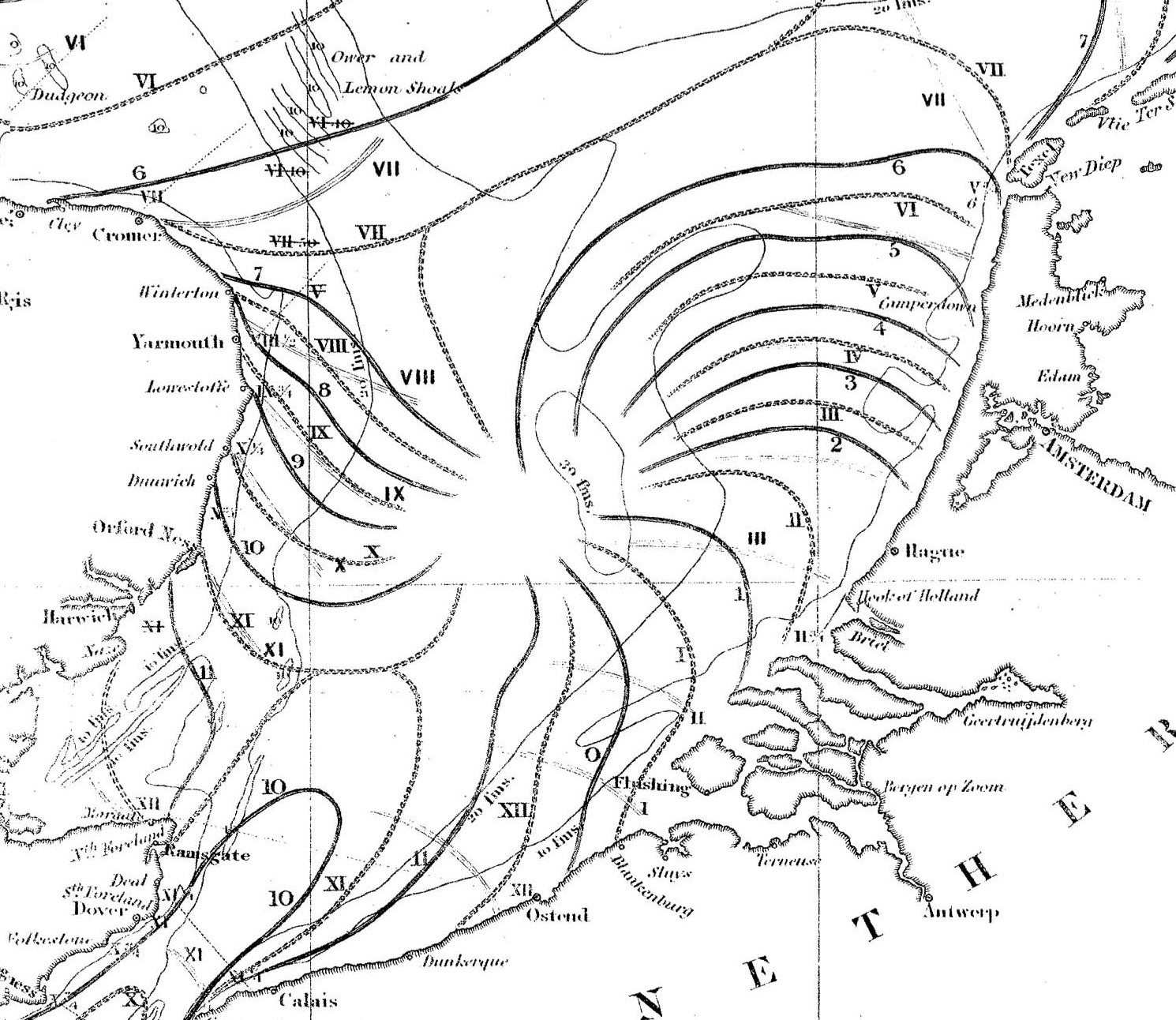
Part of Whewell's cotidal chart of 1836 showing the predicted no-tide area in the southern North Sea

Whewell made extensive use of graphical methods, and these became not just ways of displaying results, but tools in the analysis of data. He published a number of maps showing cotidal lines (a term coined by himself, but first published by Lubbock, acknowledging the inventor) – lines joining points where high tide occurred at the same time. These allowed a graphical representation of the progression of tidal waves through the ocean. From this, Whewell predicted that there should be a place where there was no tidal rise or fall in the southern part of the North Sea. Such a "no-tide zone" is now called an amphidromic point. In 1840, the naval surveyor William Hewett confirmed Whewell's prediction. This involved anchoring his ship, HMS Fairy, and taking repeated soundings at the same location with lead and line, with precautions needed to allow for irregularities in the seabed and the effects of tidal flow. The data showed a rise of no more than 1 foot (0.30 m), near the limit of accuracy.

Whewell published about 20 papers over a period of 20 years on his tidal research. This was his major scientific achievement and an important source for his understanding of the process of scientific enquiry, the subject of one of his major works, Philosophy of the Inductive Sciences.

His best-known works are two voluminous books that attempt to systematize the development of the sciences, History of the Inductive Sciences (1837) and The Philosophy of the Inductive Sciences, Founded Upon Their History (1840, 1847, 1858–60). While the History traced how each branch of the sciences had evolved since antiquity, Whewell viewed the Philosophy as the "Moral" of the previous work as it sought to extract a universal theory of knowledge through history.

In the latter, he attempted to follow Francis Bacon's plan for discovery. He examined ideas ("explication of conceptions") and by the "colligation of facts" endeavored to unite these ideas with the facts and so construct science. This colligation is an "act of thought", a mental operation consisting of bringing together a number of empirical facts by "superinducing" upon them a conception which unites the facts and renders them capable of being expressed in general laws. Whewell refers to as an example Kepler and the discovery of the elliptical orbit: the orbit's points were colligated by the conception of the ellipse, not by the discovery of new facts. These conceptions are not "innate" (as in Kant), but being the fruits of the "progress of scientific thought (history) are unfolded in clearness and distinctness".

=== Whewell's three steps of induction ===
Whewell analyzed inductive reasoning into three steps:

- The selection of the (fundamental) idea, such as space, number, cause, or likeness (resemblance);
- The formation of the conception, or more special modification of those ideas, as a circle, a uniform force, etc.; and,
- The determination of magnitudes.

Upon these follow special methods of induction applicable to quantity: the method of curves, the method of means, the method of least squares and the method of residues, and special methods depending on resemblance (to which the transition is made through the law of continuity), such as the method of gradation and the method of natural classification. In Philosophy of the Inductive Sciences Whewell was the first to use the term "consilience" to discuss the unification of knowledge between the different branches of learning.

=== Opponent of English empiricism ===
Here, as in his ethical doctrine, Whewell was moved by opposition to contemporary English empiricism. Following Immanuel Kant, he asserted against John Stuart Mill the a priori nature of necessary truth, and by his rules for the construction of conceptions he dispensed with the inductive methods of Mill. Yet, according to Laura J. Snyder, "surprisingly, the received view of Whewell's methodology in the 20th century has tended to describe him as an anti-inductivist in the Popperian mold. That is, it is claimed that Whewell endorses a 'conjectures and refutations' view of scientific discovery. ... Whewell explicitly rejects the hypothetico-deductive claim that hypotheses discovered by non-rational guesswork can be confirmed by consequentialist testing. ... [he] explains that new hypotheses are properly 'collected from the facts'". In sum, the scientific discovery is a partly empirical and partly rational process; the "discovery of the conceptions is neither guesswork nor merely a matter of observations", we infer more than we see.

=== Whewell's neologisms ===
One of Whewell's greatest gifts to science was his wordsmithing. He often corresponded with many in his field and helped them come up with new terms for their discoveries. In fact, Whewell came up with the term scientist itself in 1833, and it was first published in Whewell's anonymous 1834 review of Mary Somerville's On the Connexion of the Physical Sciences published in the Quarterly Review. (They had previously been known as "natural philosophers" or "men of science".)

== Work in college administration ==
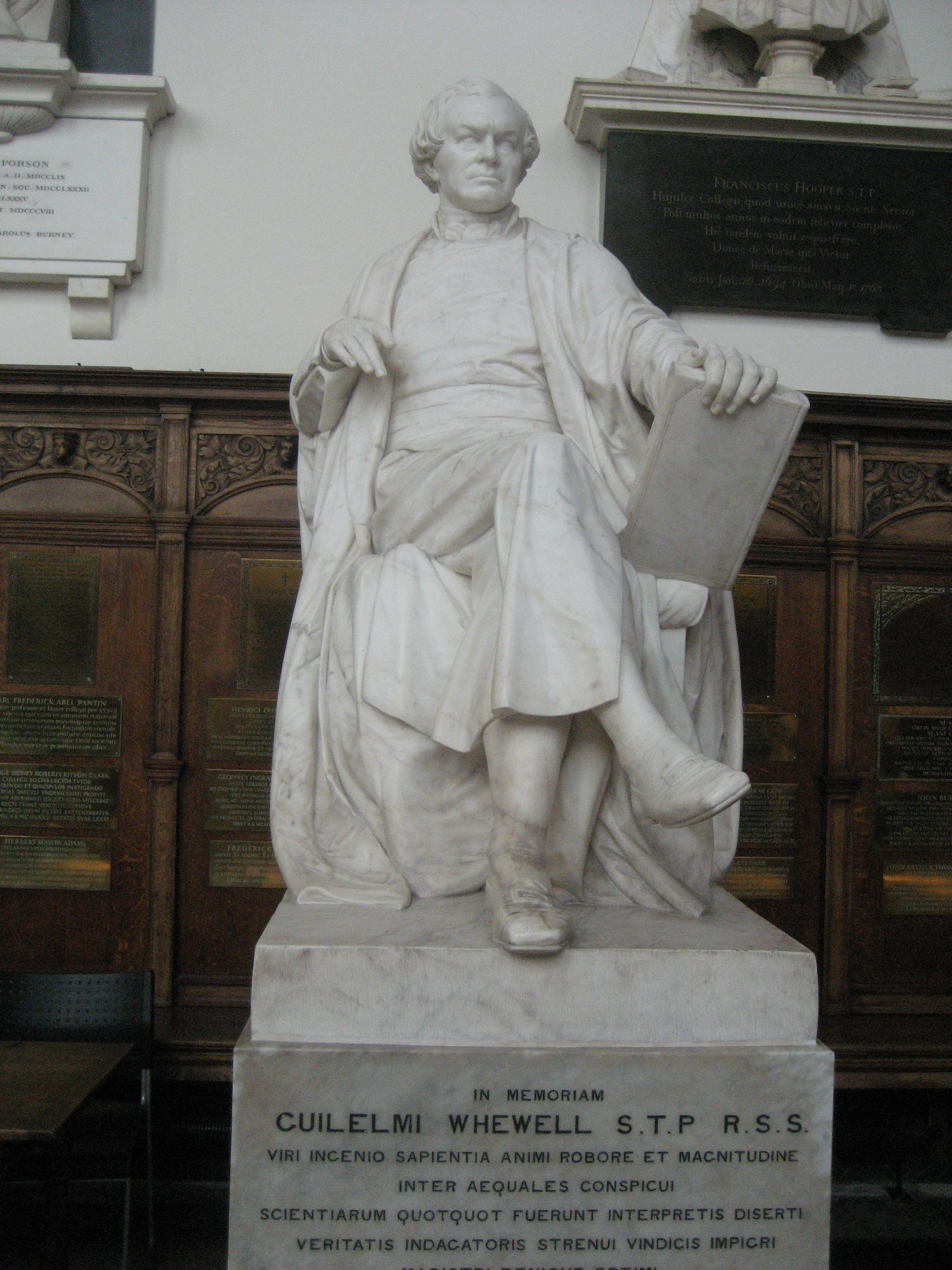
Statue of Whewell by Thomas Woolner in Trinity College Chapel, Cambridge

Whewell was prominent not only in scientific research and philosophy but also in university and college administration. His first work, An Elementary Treatise on Mechanics (1819), cooperated with those of George Peacock and John Herschel in reforming the Cambridge method of mathematical teaching. His work and publications also helped influence the recognition of the moral and natural sciences as an integral part of the Cambridge curriculum.

In general, however, especially in later years, he opposed reform: he defended the tutorial system, and in a controversy with Connop Thirlwall (1834), opposed the admission of Dissenters; he upheld the clerical fellowship system, the privileged class of "fellow-commoners", and the authority of heads of colleges in university affairs.

He opposed the appointment of the University Commission (1850) and wrote two pamphlets (Remarks) against the reform of the university (1855). He stood against the scheme of entrusting elections to the members of the senate and instead advocated the use of college funds and the subvention of scientific and professorial work.

He was elected Master of Trinity College, Cambridge in 1841, and retained that position until his death in 1866.

The Whewell Professorship of International Law and the Whewell Scholarships were established through the provisions of his will.

== Whewell's interests in architecture ==
Aside from science, Whewell was also interested in the history of architecture throughout his life. He is best known for his writings on Gothic architecture, specifically his book, Architectural Notes on German Churches (first published in 1830). In this work, Whewell established a strict nomenclature for German Gothic churches and developed a theory of stylistic development. His work is associated with the "scientific trend" of architectural writers, along with Thomas Rickman and Robert Willis.

He paid from his own resources for the construction of two new courts of rooms at Trinity College, Cambridge, built in a Gothic style. The two courts were completed in 1860 and (posthumously) in 1868, and are now collectively named Whewell's Court (in the singular).

== Whewell's works in philosophy and morals ==
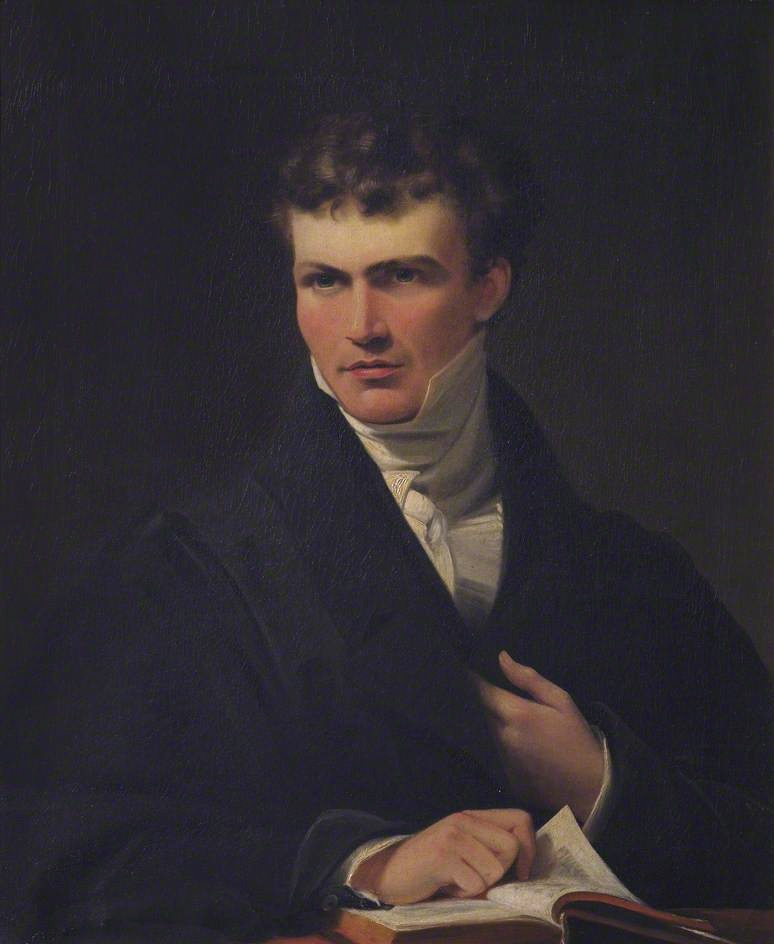
Portrait by James Lonsdale

Between 1835 and 1861, Whewell produced various works on the philosophy of morals and politics, the chief of which, Elements of Morality, including Polity, was published in 1845. The peculiarity of this work—written from what is known as the intuitional point of view—is its fivefold division of the springs of action and of their objects, of the primary and universal rights of man (personal security, property, contract, family rights, and government), and of the cardinal virtues (benevolence, justice, truth, purity and order).

Among Whewell's other works—too numerous to mention—were popular writings such as:

- the third Bridgewater Treatise, Astronomy and General Physics considered with reference to Natural Theology (1833),
- the two-volume treatise The Philosophy of the Inductive Sciences: Founded Upon Their History (1840),
- the essay Of the Plurality of Worlds (1853), in which he argued against the probability of life on other planets,
- the Platonic Dialogues for English Readers (1850–1861),
- the Lectures on the History of Moral Philosophy in England (1852),
- the essay, Of a Liberal Education in General, with particular reference to the Leading Studies of the University of Cambridge (1845),
- the important edition and abridged translation of Hugo Grotius, De jure belli ac pacis (1853), and
- the edition of the Mathematical Works of Isaac Barrow (1860).

Whewell was one of the Cambridge dons whom Charles Darwin met during his education there, and when Darwin returned from the Beagle voyage he was directly influenced by Whewell, who persuaded Darwin to become secretary of the Geological Society of London. The title pages of On the Origin of Species open with a quotation from Whewell's Bridgewater Treatise about science founded on a natural theology of a creator establishing laws:

But with regard to the material world, we can at least go so far as this—we can perceive that events are brought about not by insulated interpositions of Divine power, exerted in each particular case, but by the establishment of general laws.

Though Darwin used Whewell's concepts as he made and tested his hypotheses regarding the theory of evolution, Whewell did not support Darwin's theory itself.

"Whewell also famously opposed the idea of evolution. First, he published a new book, Indications of the Creator, 1845, composed of extracts from his earlier works to counteract the popular anonymous evolutionary work Vestiges of the Natural History of Creation. Later Whewell opposed Darwin's theories of evolution."

This may be one reason Whewell has become a forgotten figure. As Peter Medawar wrote in 'The Art of the Soluble' (1967)
"Whewell is never heard of nowadays outside the ranks of historians of science; if one mentions his name one may be asked to spell it."

=== Works by Whewell ===
- (1830) Architectural Notes on German Churches: With Remarks on the Origin of Gothic Architecture. Cambridge: J. & J.J. Deighton. 1830. New edition 1835. Third edition 1842.
- (1831) "Review of J. Herschel's Preliminary discourse on the study of Natural Philosophy". The Quarterly Review. 45 (90): 374–407. July 1831.
- (1833) Astronomy and general physics considered with reference to Natural Theology (Bridgewater Treatise). Cambridge.
- (1836) Elementary Treatise on Mechanics, 5th edition, first edition 1819.
- (1837) History of the Inductive Sciences, from the Earliest to the Present Times. 3 vols, London. Volume 1, volume 2, volume 3. 2nd ed 1847 (2 vols). 3rd ed 1857 (2 vols). 1st German ed 1840–41.
- (1837) On the Principles of English University Education. London, 1837.
- (1840) The Philosophy of the Inductive Sciences, founded upon their history. 2 vols, London. 2nd ed 1847. Volume 1. Volume 2.
- (1845) The Elements of Morality, including polity. 2 vols, London. Volume 1 Volume 2.
- (1845) Indications of the Creator, Extracts bearing upon Theology from the History and Philosophy of the Inductive Sciences, London, 1st Ed, 1845.
- (1846) Lectures on systematic Morality. London.
- (1849) Of Induction, with especial reference to Mr J. Stuart Mill's System of Logic. London.
- (1850) Mathematical exposition of some doctrines of political economy: a second memoir. Transactions of the Cambridge Philosophical Society 9:128–49.
- (1852) Lectures on the history of Moral Philosophy. Cambridge: Cambridge University Press.
- (1853) Hugonis Grotii de jure belli et pacis libri tres: accompanied by an abridged translation by William Whewell, London: John W. Parker, volume 1, volume 2, volume 3.
- (1853) Of the Plurality of Worlds. London.
- (1857) Spedding's complete edition of the works of Bacon. Edinburgh Review 106:287–322.
- (1858a) The history of scientific ideas. 2 vols, London.
- (1858b) Novum Organon renovatum, London.
- (1860a) On the philosophy of discovery: chapters historical and critical. London.
- (1861) Plato's Republic (translation). Cambridge.
- (1862) Six Lectures on Political Economy, Cambridge.
- (1862) Additional Lectures on the History of Moral Philosophy, Cambridge.
- (1866) Comte and Positivism. Macmillan's Magazine 13:353–62.

== Honors and recognitions ==
- Foreign Honorary Member of the American Academy of Arts and Sciences (1847)
- The debating society at Lancaster Royal Grammar School is named the Whewell Society in honor of Whewell being an Old Lancastrian.
- The crater Whewell on the Moon
- The Gothic buildings known as Whewell's Court in Trinity College, Cambridge
- The Whewell Mineral Gallery in the Sedgwick Museum of Earth Sciences, Cambridge
- The mineral whewellite

== In fiction ==
In the 1857 novel Barchester Towers, Charlotte Stanhope uses the topic of the theological arguments, concerning the possibility of intelligent life on other planets, between Whewell and David Brewster in an attempt to start up a conversation between her impecunious brother and the wealthy young widow Eleanor Bold.

== See also ==
- Catastrophism
- Uniformitarianism
- Earl of Bridgewater for other Bridgewater Treatise
- Law of three stages for Whewell's opposition to Auguste Comte's positivism
- Michael Faraday

Academic offices
Preceded by Christopher Wordsworth	Master of Trinity College, Cambridge; 1841–1866	Succeeded by William Hepworth Thompson
