= William Cooke (priest, born 1821) =

William Cooke (1821 – 23 November 1894), widely known as Canon Cooke, was a Church of England clergyman, hymn-writer, and translator.

As an author he sometimes signed his work A. C. C., which stood for "a canon of Chester".

== Early life ==
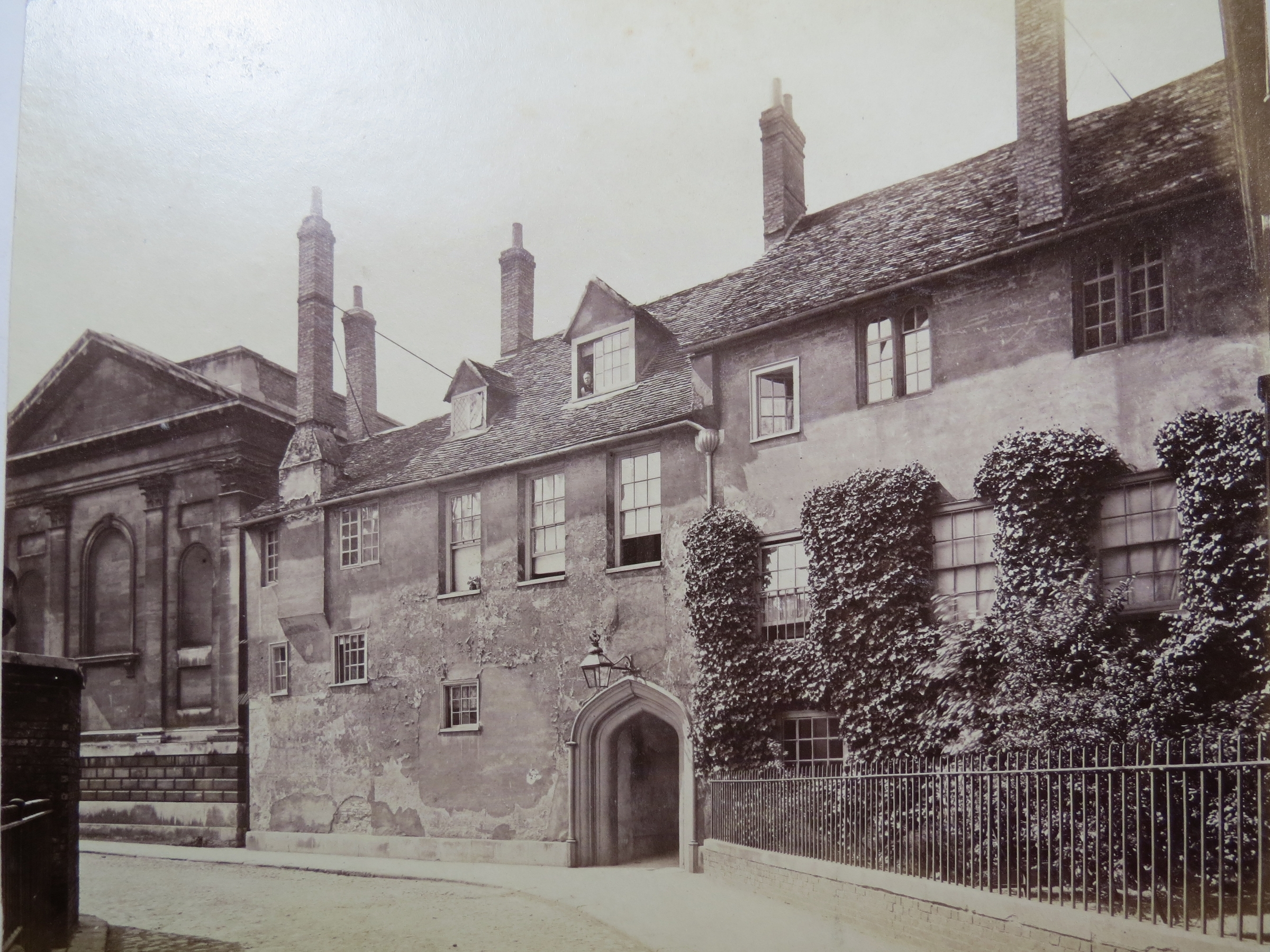
Trinity Hall, Cambridge, in Cooke's time

Baptised on 17 March 1821, the fourth son of Thomas Cooke, Esquire, of Gorsefield, Eccles, Lancashire, Cooke was educated at Clapham by the Rev. Dr N. Laing and was admitted to Trinity Hall, Cambridge, on 10 October 1836. He actually matriculated in the Michaelmas term of 1839, was elected a Scholar in 1840, and graduated BA in 1843, proceeding to MA in 1848. In 1844 he was ordained a deacon of the Church of England.

== Career ==
Cooke served as curate of Hillingdon, Middlesex, from 1844 to 1846, and in 1845 was ordained a priest. His next appointment was as curate of Brantham, Suffolk, from 1846 to 1848, and then for two years he was priest-in-charge of St John's Church, Charlotte Street, near Fitzroy Square, Westminster. In 1850 he moved on to become priest in charge of St Stephen's Church, Shepherd's Bush, and the same year was a Select Preacher at Cambridge. He was elected an honorary Canon of Chester Cathedral in 1854, a position he kept until his death in 1894.

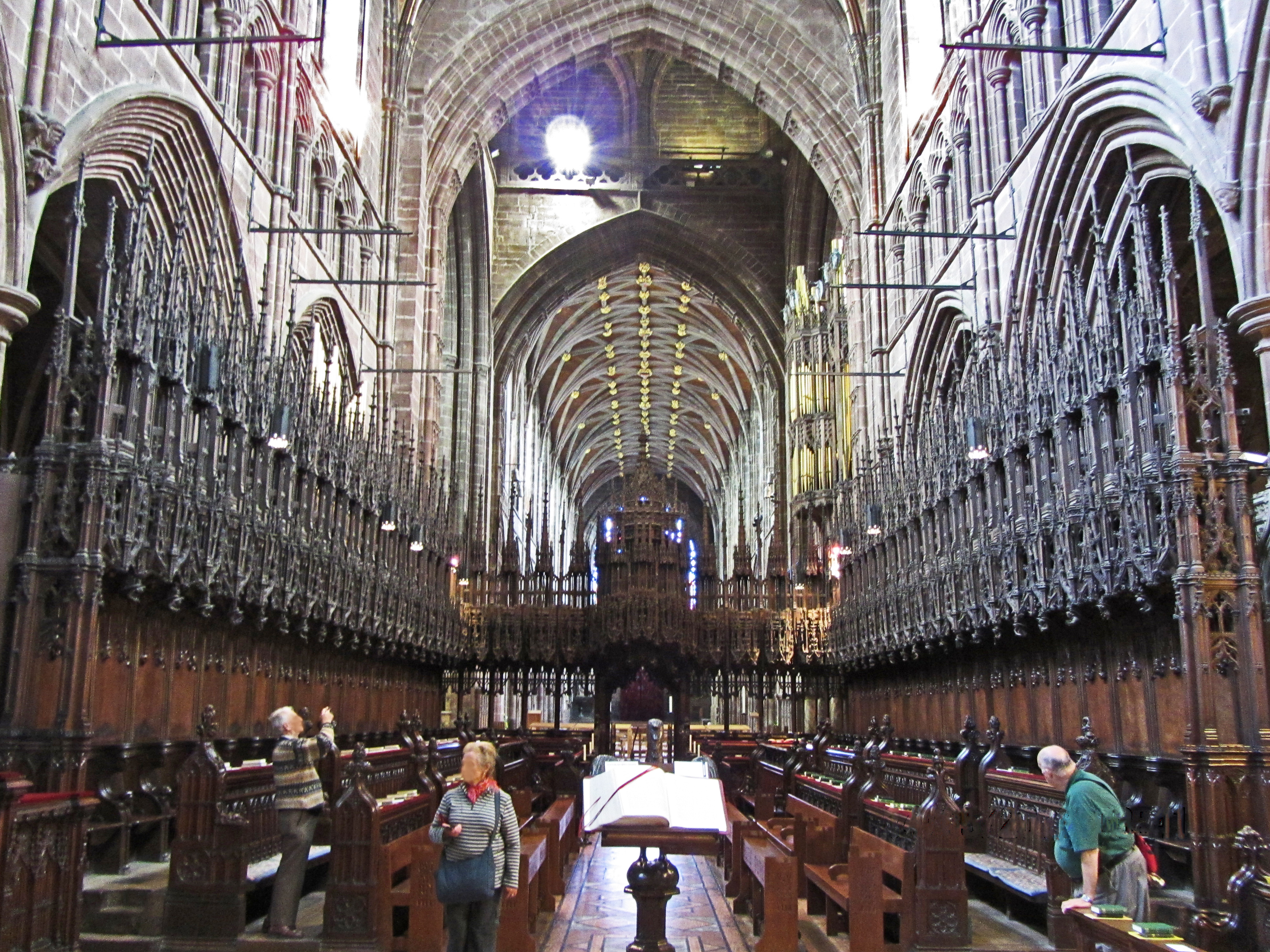
Chester Cathedral

Cooke composed many hymns and also translated songs from the German. Typical of such work is his "Wake, awake, for night is flying" (1871), a translation of the hymn "Wachet auf, ruft uns die Stimme" by Philipp Nicolai, first published in 1599. His "In Exile Here We Wander", one of the works he signed "A. C. C.", was based on a 17th-century hymn of Paul Gerhardt.

Near the end of his life, Cooke donated his library to Selwyn College, Cambridge, which had been founded in 1882, giving the college a collection later described as "five thousand rare, valuable, and useful patristic, liturgical, and other works".

With Christopher Wordsworth, Bishop of Lincoln, Cooke edited for the Henry Bradshaw Society the early 15th century Ordinale Sarum of Clement Maydeston, but the work did not appear in print until 1901, several years after the death of both editors.

== Private life ==
On 22 May 1847, Cooke married Fanny, a daughter of the Rev. George John Haggitt (1790–1847), late Rector of Hawkedon, Suffolk, who had died on 1 March.

== Selected publications ==
- Thou shalt not remove thy Neighbour's Landmark : the Romish Aggression Unscriptural (1850)
- We are Ambassadors for Christ: a Sermon (1850)
- The Deadly Poison – Sin: a Sermon (1856)
- Worship of Men and Angels Through the Incarnate Word (London and Liverpool: 1865)
- Of Ceremonies, Lights, and Custom. A letter to the Rev. T. W. Perry (James Parker, 1868)
- The Church Hymnal: a Book of Church Song, ed., with Rev. William Denton (Barnby / Novello, 1872)
- The Hymnary, ed., with Rev. Benjamin Webb
- Ordinale Sarum, sive Directorium Sacerdotum (Liber quem Pica Sarum vulgo vocitat clerus) (Henry Bradshaw Society, 1901), ed., with Christopher Wordsworth
