= Christopher Wordsworth (liturgiologist) =

English liturgiologist and author

Christopher Wordsworth (born Westminster, 26 March 1848; died Salisbury 30 January 1938) was an English liturgiologist and author.

== Early life and education ==
He was the second son of Susanna Hatley Frere (1811–1884) and Bishop Christopher Wordsworth, and a grandson of Christopher Wordsworth, Master of Trinity College, Cambridge. His elder sister, Elizabeth Wordsworth, was the founding Principal of Lady Margaret Hall, Oxford.

Wordsworth attended Winchester College, graduated from Trinity College, Cambridge, and was a fellow of Peterhouse from 1870 to 1878.

== Career ==
He was ordained in 1872. In 1874 he married Mary, daughter of the Rev. Andrew Reeve, vicar of Kimmeridge, Dorset. He served curacies in Alvechurch and St Giles' Church, Cambridge, and incumbencies at Glaston, Tyneham, East Holme and Marlborough. He was Chancellor of Lincoln Cathedral from 1917 to 1928, and of Salisbury Cathedral from 1917 until his death. Among other roles he was Master of St Nicholas' Hospital, Harnham, Salisbury from 1895 to 1937, and Librarian of Salisbury Cathedral from 1913 to 1936.

== Selected works ==
The British Library catalogue has 39 of Wordsworth's works, including:

- "University Society in the Eighteenth Century", 1874
- "Scholae Academicae", 1877
- "Sarum Breviary" 3 vols, 1879–86
- "Pontificale of St Andrews", 1885
- "Lincoln Cathedral Statutes", 3 vols, 1892–97
- "Coronation of King Charles I and Tracts of Clement Maydeston", 1892–94
- "Mediaeval Services", 1898
- "Sarum Pye and Salisbury Processions", 1901
- "St Nicholas' Hospital, Salisbury, Charters", 1903
- "Salisbury Cathedral Statutes", 1915
