= William Leonard Courtney =

English writer

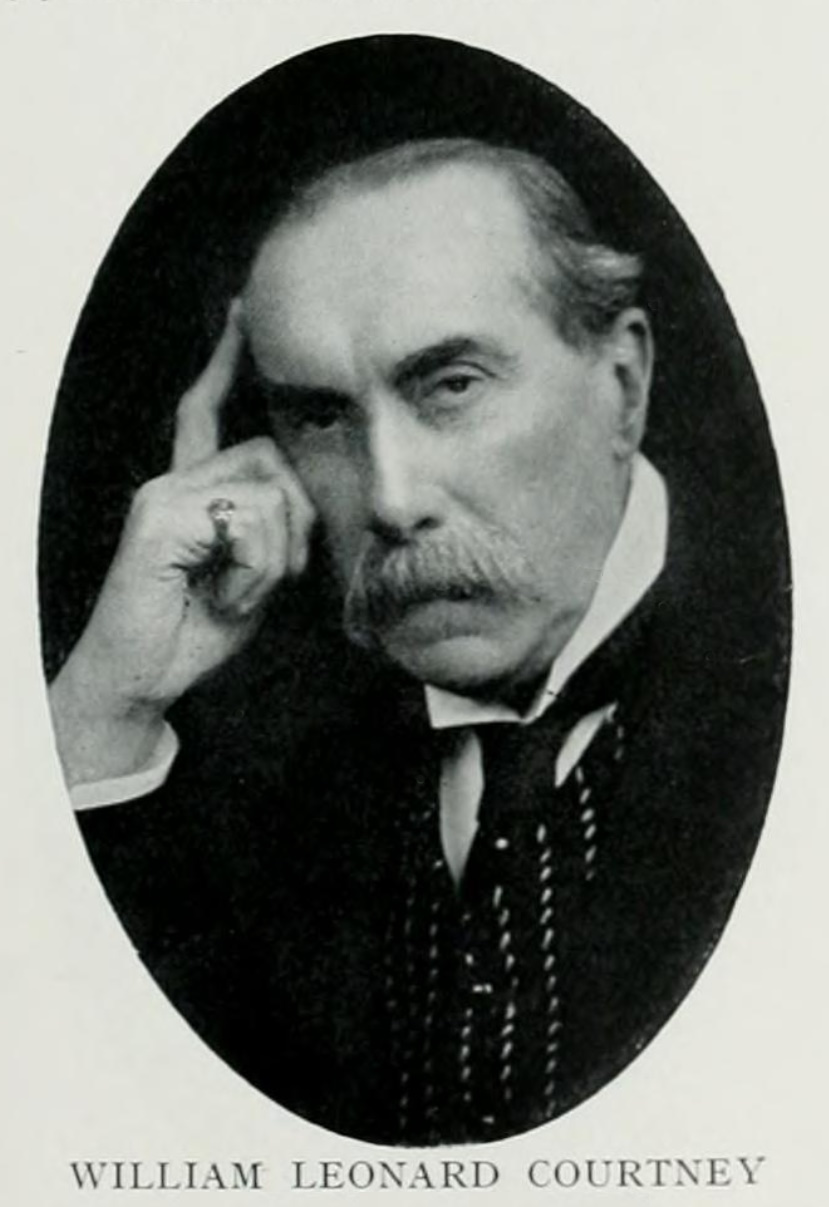
- W. L. Courtney (photographed in about 1922).
- Born: William Leonard Courtney; 5 January 1850; Poona, India
- Died: 1 November 1928 (aged 78); London
- Occupations: Writer, philosopher, journalist, editor
- Spouse(s): (1) Cordelia Blanche Place (2) Janet Elizabeth Hogarth

William Leonard Courtney (5 January 1850 – 1 November 1928) was an English writer, philosopher and journalist. From 1876 to 1890 he taught philosophy at New College, Oxford University. From 1890 until his death in 1928 Courtney had a successful career as a journalist, editor and drama and literary critic, working principally for The Daily Telegraph and The Fortnightly Review. He was a published author of over twenty works and a playwright.

== Biography ==
=== Early life ===
William Leonard Courtney was born on 5 January 1850 at Poona, India, the son of William Courtney, of the Indian Civil Service, and Ann Edwards (née Scott). He was the youngest of six children, having two brothers and three sisters.

William was educated at the Somersetshire College at Bath. The prestigious Somersetshire College was located at The Circus, a circle of townhouses in Bath, and had been founded in 1858 when a private home was converted to school rooms and offices. The school's stated aim was to provide for the sons of gentlemen "a course of education similar to that of our best public schools, with more attention to individual boys than their larger numbers render possible".

=== Academia ===
In 1868 Courtney was admitted as a scholar to University College, Oxford University. After a successful undergraduate career in which he achieved a first-class grade in the classics course Literae Humaniores, Courtney was elected to a fellowship at Oxford's Merton College. However Courtney wished to marry and all four tutorial fellowships allowed for married men at Merton were already filled. During 1873 the position of headmaster at his old school, Somersetshire College, became vacant and Courtney's academic successes induced the governors to offer him the position. He accepted the offer, resigned his fellowship and left Oxford for Bath.

On 14 July 1874 Courtney married Cordelia Blanche Place at Norley in Cheshire. The couple had seven children, born between 1875 and 1888. Courtney remained as headmaster of Somersetshire College at Bath until 1876. His period as a private school headmaster was not a success. The older staff-members resented his youthfulness and his plan to increase pupil numbers by accepting the sons of local tradesmen was opposed by the school governors and parents of the existing students.

Courtney returned to Oxford in 1876 to teach philosophy. He was offered a tutorial fellowship, that could be held by a married man, at Oxford University's New College. He gratefully accepted and began to teach moral philosophy for the Literae Humaniores course. The terms of his appointment stipulated that after a specified period of service he had the option of retiring but nevertheless retaining the rights and emoluments of a fellow of New College. William and Cordelia Courtney and their growing family made their home in Park Town, in North Oxford.

Courtney soon "made his mark as a teacher", delivering lectures on Plato and the English philosophers. He wrote three books during his Oxford years: The Metaphysics of John Stuart Mill (1879), Studies in Philosophy: Ancient and Modern (1882), and Constructive Ethics (1886). Courtney's book Constructive Ethics, written in 1886, was a historical and critical treatise on ethics which "attained considerable popularity" amongst students in the Literae Humaniores course.

In April 1882 the professorial chair of Moral Philosophy became vacant after the death of Thomas Hill Green at the age of forty-five. Green had been Courtney's mentor in philosophy and he and William Wallace (of Merton College) vied for the vacant position. Both men were followers of Green's neo-Hegelianism. Wallace was older than Courtney and had been a successful college tutor for fifteen years, but Courtney had already published two books in his short academic career as opposed to Wallace's more modest publishing record. When Wallace was appointed to the professorship, Courtney reacted by becoming a candidate for the headmastership of Dulwich College, but was unsuccessful and opted to remain at Oxford. During 1882, while still at Oxford University, Courtney became an assistant editor of Fortnightly Review.

Courtney participated in Oxford theatrical activities as an amateur actor. He was in the cast of a performance of Agamemnon at the Balliol College Hall in June 1880. Courtney took an active part in the movement that led to the foundation in 1886 of the New Theatre, which placed the Oxford University Dramatic Society (OUDS) "on a sound and recognised footing in the University". He was involved in the production of Stafford, King John and other plays performed by the OUDS in the early days of the New Theatre.

Courtney was the treasurer of the University Boat Club. He was the coach of the New College eight and "was a conspicuous figure on the towpath". Courtney was described as "a leading figure in the social world of the University, the life of the Senior Common Room of New College, ... hail-fellow-well-met with the undergraduates, but at the same time a philosopher of no mean merit".

In 1889 there were two professorial elections for the two remaining chairs in Courtney's field. The first to become vacant was the Professorship of Logic, with John Cook Wilson and Thomas Case each competing against Courtney for the position, culminating with Wilson being elected. Later in 1889 the Professorship of Moral and Metaphysical Philosophy became available, but Courtney was again unsuccessful, with Case being elected to the position.

In January 1890 a short play written by Courtney called Kit Marlowe's Death was published in the journal The Universal Review. The play was performed at St. James's Theatre in London with Arthur Bourchier in the lead role.

=== Journalism ===
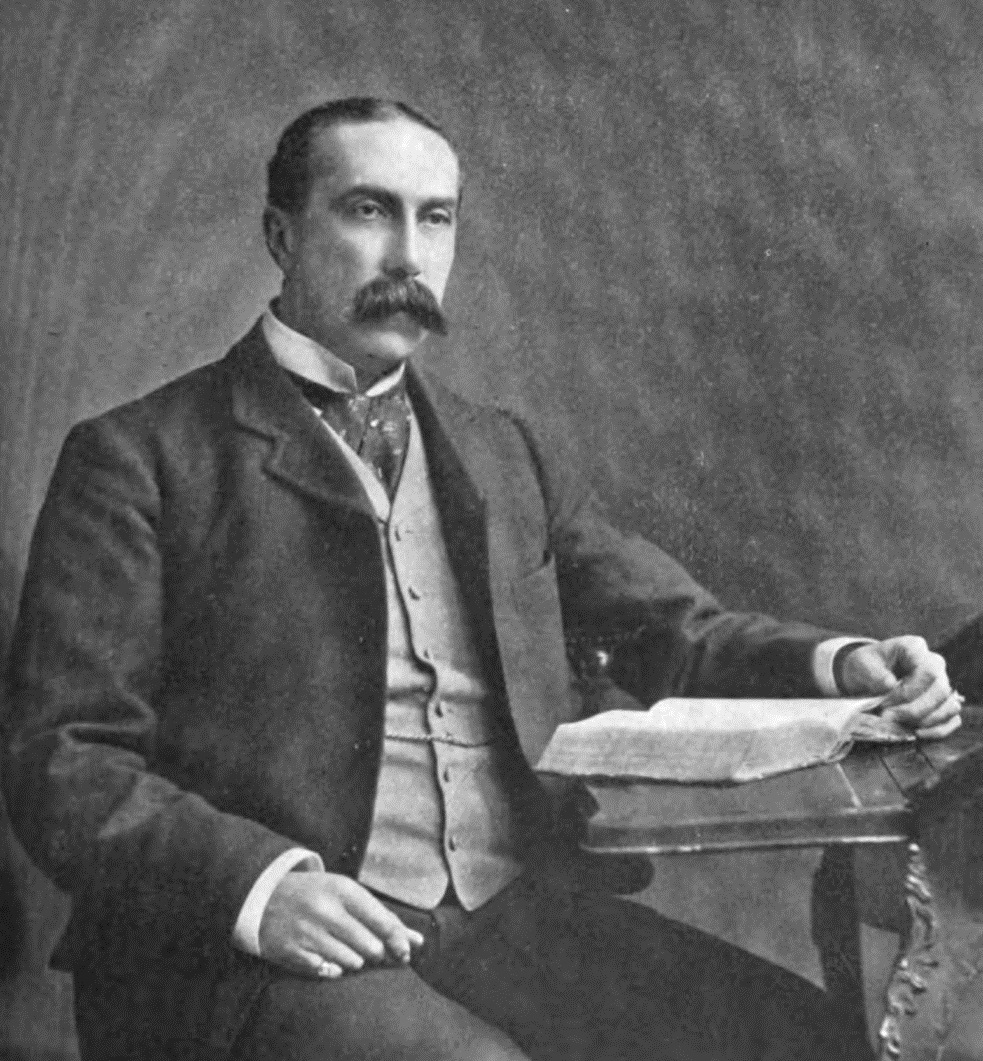
Photograph of William Leonard Courtney, published in The Critic, January 1902.

In 1890 Courtney left Oxford to join The Daily Telegraph newspaper, beginning a 38-year career on Fleet Street, writing general articles as well as drama and literary criticism. He remained as the drama critic and literary editor of The Daily Telegraph until December 1924, but continued to contribute to the newspaper. For a short time Courtney edited Murray's Magazine.

In April 1891 Courtney and his family were living at 53 Belsize Park in Hampstead, London. As well as Courtney, his wife and five of his children, the household was made up of six servants, a nurse and an under-nurse, a housemaid and an under-housemaid, a parlour maid and a cook.

In 1894 Courtney became editor of The Fortnightly Review. He continued in that role until his death in 1928. Books during this time included The Feminine Note in Fiction (1904).

Courtney served as a director of the publishing firm of Chapman and Hall Ltd., the publishers of The Fortnightly Review.

Courtney wrote at least nine plays beginning with Kit Marlowe's Death in 1890, though their performances were not commercially successful. John Marriott wrote of Courtney after his death that "his hand was just a little too heavy for successful play-writing". A comedy called Gaston Bonnier: Or, Time's Revenges, was published in the Anglo-Saxon Review in March 1901. Courtney's play, Undine, described as "a dream play in three acts", was published in 1902 by William Heinemann of London. Undine was performed in 1906. Other plays included A Woman's Revolt, performed in 1908, and Oedipus Rex, performed in 1912. Several of Courtney's plays were performed in New York. In late-November 1905 The Labyrinth played for a short season at the Herald Square Theatre. Courtney's theatrical adaptation of Robert Louis Stevenson's Markheim was performed in October 1906 at the New Amsterdam Theatre. His adaptation of Sophocles' Oedipus Rex opened for a short season in the Century Theatre in New York in late-October 1923.

Courtney's wife Cordelia died on 12 May 1907 at St. Pancras in London, "after a long and distressing illness".

On 17 July 1911 Courtney married Janet Elizabeth Hogarth. Janet was on the editorial staff of the Encyclopædia Britannica at the time. She had been taught by Courtney at Oxford and later worked for him at The Fortnightly Review.

W. L. Courtney's autobiography The Passing Hour, described as "an entertaining book of reminiscences", was published in 1925.

William Leonard Courtney died on 1 November 1928 in London. His funeral service was held at St. Pancras church.

Janet Courtney wrote a biography of her late husband, The Making of an Editor: W. L. Courtney, 1850-1928, published in 1930.

== Publications ==
- The Metaphysics of John Stuart Mill (1879), London: Kegan Paul & Co.
- Studies on Philosophy: Ancient and Modern (1882), London: Rivingtons.
- Constructive Ethics (1886), London: Chapman & Hall Ltd.
- Studies: New and Old (1888), London: Chapman & Hall Ltd.
- Life of John Stuart Mill (1889), London: W. Scott; New York: T. Whittaker.
- Studies at Leisure (1892), London: Chapman & Hall Ltd.
- Hubert Herkomer (Royal Academician): His Life and Work (1892), London: Art Journal Office.
- The Idea of Tragedy in Ancient and Modern Drama (1900)
- The Development of Maurice Maeterlinck and Other Sketches of Foreign Writers (1904), London: G. Richards.
- The Feminine Note in Fiction (1904), London: Chapman & Hall Ltd.
- The Literary Man's Bible (1907), London: Chapman & Hall Ltd.
- Dramas and Diversions (1908), London: Chapman & Hall Ltd.
- Rosemary's Letter Book (1909), London: Andrew Melrose.
- In Search of Egeria: Episodes in the Life of Maurice Westerton (1911), London: Chapman & Hall Ltd.
- Soul of a Suffragette, and Other Stories (1913), London: Chapman & Hall Ltd.
- Armageddon – and After (1914), London: Chapman & Hall Ltd.
- Meaning of Life (c. 1914), London : B. T. Batsford.
- The Literary Man's New Testament (1915), London: Chapman & Hall Ltd.
- Pillars of Empire: Studies and Impressions (with Janet Elizabeth Courtney) (1918), London: Jarrolds Publishers Ltd.
- Old Saws and Modern Instances (1918), London: Chapman & Hall Ltd.
- The Passing Hour (1925), London: Hutchinson & Co.
