= John Wordsworth =

English Anglican bishop and classical scholar (1843–1911)

The Right Reverend John Wordsworth FBA
- Bishop of Salisbury
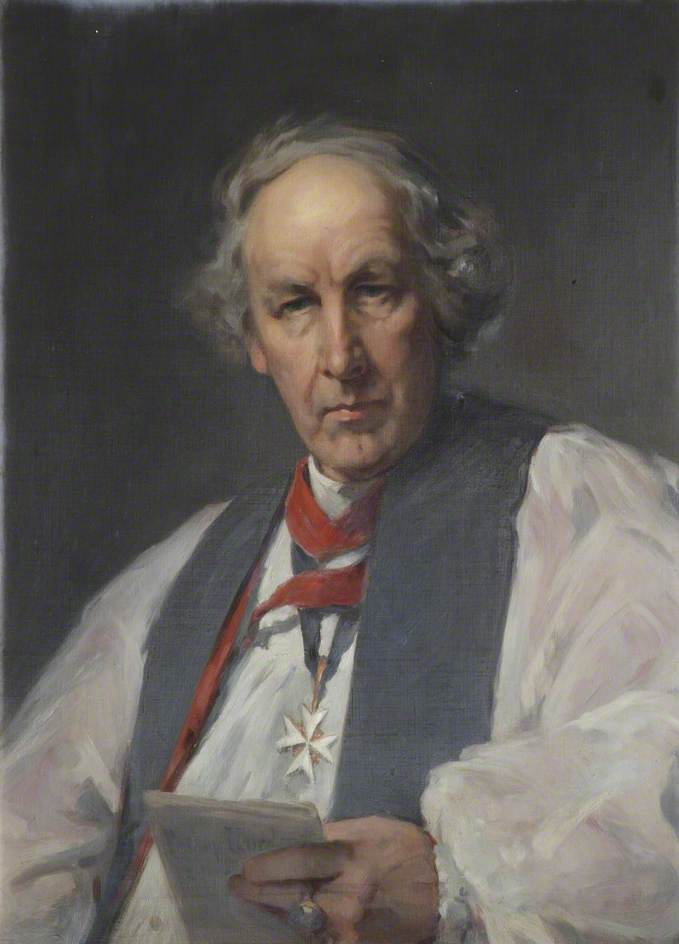
- Church: Church of England
- Province: Canterbury
- Diocese: Salisbury
- In office: 1885–1911
- Predecessor: George Moberly
- Successor: Frederick Ridgeway

Orders
- Ordination: 21 February 1869 by Samuel Wilberforce
- Consecration: 28 October 1885 by Edward White Benson

Personal details
- Born: 21 September 1843 Harrow on the Hill, England
- Died: 16 August 1911 (aged 67)
- Denomination: Anglicanism
- Parents: Christopher Wordsworth; Susanna
- Spouse: Susan Esther Coxe (m. 1870; died 1894); Mary Anne Frances Williams (m. 1896)

Academic background
- Education: New College, Oxford

Academic work
- Discipline: Classics; biblical studies
- Institutions: Oriel College, Oxford

John Wordsworth FBA (21 September 1843 – 16 August 1911) was an English Anglican bishop and classical scholar. He was Oriel Professor of the Interpretation of Holy Scripture at the University of Oxford from 1883 to 1885, and Bishop of Salisbury from 1885 to 1911.

== Life ==
He was born at Harrow on the Hill, to the priest (and later bishop) Christopher Wordsworth, nephew of the poet William Wordsworth. He was born into a clerical family: his father was to become Bishop of Lincoln, his uncle, Charles Wordsworth, Bishop of Saint Andrews, Dunkeld and Dunblane, and his grandfather, Christopher Wordsworth had been Master of Trinity College, Cambridge.

John Wordsworth was a precocious child, the third in a family of seven and the elder of two brothers. His younger brother Christopher (1848–1938) was to become a noted liturgical scholar, and his eldest sister Dame Elizabeth Wordsworth was a pioneer of women's higher education and the founding Principal of Lady Margaret Hall, Oxford.

He studied at Winchester College and New College, Oxford, where he was awarded a First in Classical Moderations (1863) and a Second in Greats (1865) (MA 1868). He became an Assistant Master at Wellington College in 1866. In the following year he was elected Craven Scholar and a Fellow of Brasenose College, Oxford and was ordained in the Church of England. He was Select Preacher before the University of Oxford in 1876 and 1888, Grinfield Lecturer on the Septuagint 1876–1878, and Bampton Lecturer in 1881. From 1883 until 1885 he held concurrently the positions of Oriel Professor of the Interpretation of Holy Scripture and Fellow of Oriel at Oxford, and canon of Rochester Cathedral. He had already been appointed a prebendary of Lincoln Cathedral in 1870 and Whitehall Preacher in 1879.

In 1878, Oxford University Press accepted a proposal from him for the publication of a critical edition of the Vulgate text of the New Testament, which should reproduce, so far as possible, the exact words of Jerome. The enterprise was in progress the rest of his life. As a preliminary to the substantive publication, certain important manuscripts were from 1883 onwards printed in full in the series Old-Latin Biblical Texts. Subsequently, he associated with himself in his work Henry Julian White.

In 1885, at the age of 42, he became Bishop of Salisbury.

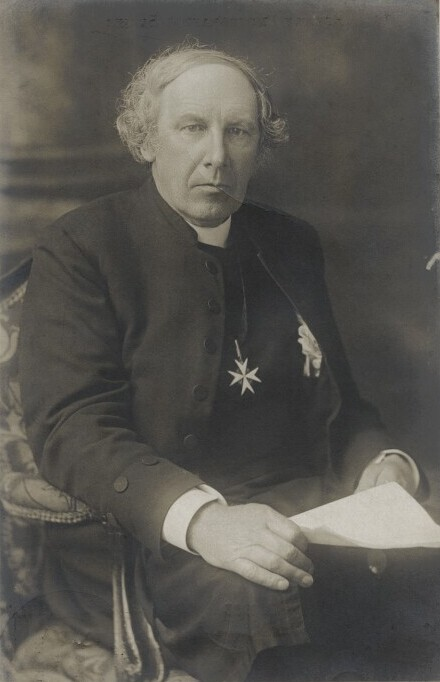
Wordsworth, c. 1907

Three years into his term of office at Salisbury, Wordsworth inaugurated the Salisbury Church Day School Association. Salisbury had reached a time of educational and political crisis and the Association set about the task of raising the £14,000 necessary to build three new primary schools and to add an infants' department to the existing St Thomas' School, thus accommodating another 1,121 children. In addition Wordsworth founded his own school at a cost of £3,000, entirely at his own expense. He purchased a piece of land adjoining the grounds of the palace and started building in 1889. Whilst building work was being completed, the bishop started his school in January 1890 in his own palace, the pupils moving to their new building in April 1890 when the new school was officially opened. The school was known at the time as the Bishop's School, being renamed the year after Wordsworth's death as Bishop Wordsworth's School.

Wordsworth was married twice, first to Susan Esther Coxe (1870), daughter of the Bodleian librarian Henry Octavius Coxe, who died at the palace in 1894; and then to Mary Anne Frances Williams (1896). There were four sons and two daughters to his second marriage. Wordsworth undertook three major foreign visits during his episcopacy, the first to New Zealand as he recovered from the death of his first wife, and the others to Sweden in 1909 and to America in 1910. He died at the palace on 16 August 1911, working right up to the very end.

A friend, Canon Woodall, remembering a conversation held some years before, recalled: "Some years ago ... when walking with him on the site of the present St Mark's School he said, 'I should like to see Salisbury a great educational centre. I should like to found a school which shall be equal to the greatest and best of our public schools.'"

The school's motto – and his father's epitaph – "Veritas in Caritate" survives him to the present day.

John Wordsworth is buried in the churchyard of St. Peter's Church, Britford, near Salisbury.

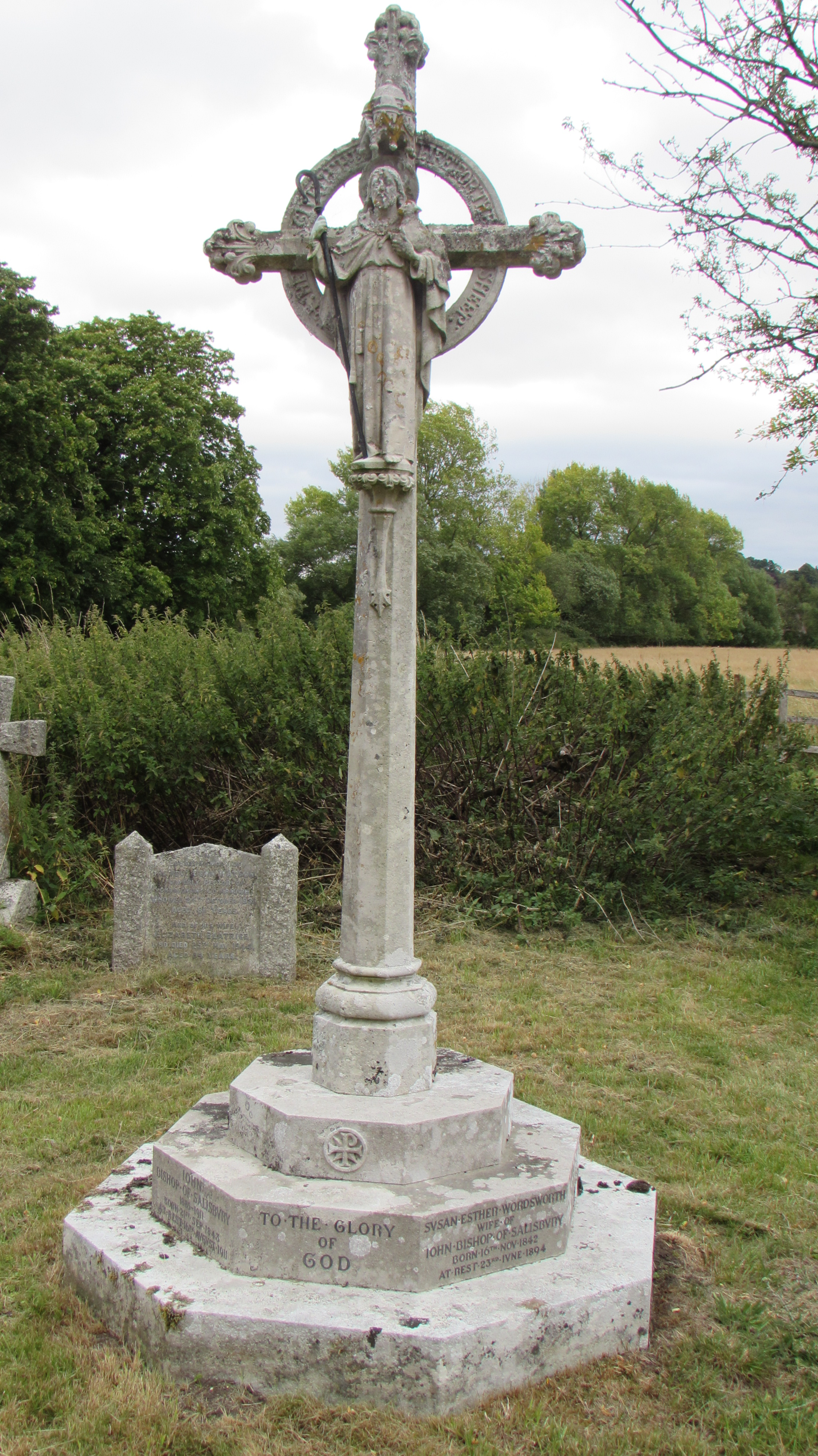
Wordsworth's memorial in Britford churchyard

== Poems ==
- O God, in whose all-searching eye (1862)

== Works ==
- Wordsworth, John (1874). Fragments and specimens of early Latin. Oxford: Clarendon Press.
- Wordsworth, John (1883). The Oxford critical edition of the Vulgate New Testament. Oxford.
- The Gospel according to St. Matthew, from the St. Germain ms. (g_{1}), now numbered Lat. 11553 in the National Library at Paris. Old-Latin Biblical Texts 1. John Wordsworth (ed.). Oxford: Clarendon Press. 1883.
- Portions of the Gospels according to St. Mark and St. Matthew. Old-Latin Biblical Texts 2. John Wordsworth, W. Sanday, H.J. White (eds.). Oxford: Clarendon Press. 1886.
- Nouum Testamentum Domini nostri Iesu Christi Latine, secundum editionem sancti Hieronymi. John Wordsworth, Henry Julian White (eds.). Oxford: Clarendon Press. 1889–1954. (Volume 1, Volume 3)
- Nouum Testamentum Latine, secundum editionem sancti Hieronymi. John Wordsworth, Henry Julian White (eds.) (Editio minor ed.). Oxford: Clarendon Press. 1911.

Church of England titles
Preceded by George Moberly	Bishop of Salisbury; 1885–1911	Succeeded by Frederic Ridgeway
Academic offices
Preceded by Edwin Hatch	Bampton Lecturer; 1881	Succeeded by Peter Medd
New office	Oriel Professor of the Interpretation of Holy Scripture; 1883–1885	Succeeded by Thomas Kelly Cheyne
