= Charles Wordsworth =

Bishop of St Andrews, Dunkeld and Dunblane

The Right Reverend Charles Wordsworth
- Bishop of St Andrews, Dunkeld and Dunblane
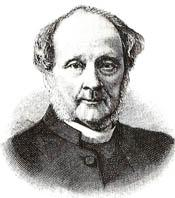
- Church: Scottish Episcopal Church
- Diocese: St Andrews, Dunkeld and Dunblane
- Elected: 30 November 1852
- In office: 1853–1892
- Predecessor: Patrick Torry
- Successor: George Wilkinson

Orders
- Ordination: 13 December 1840 by Charles Sumner
- Consecration: 25 January 1853 by William Skinner
- Rank: Bishop

Personal details
- Born: 22 August 1806 Lambeth, London, England
- Died: 5 December 1892 (aged 86) St Andrews, Fife, Scotland
- Buried: Eastern Cemetery, St Andrews
- Denomination: Anglican
- Parents: Christopher Wordsworth & Priscilla Lloyd
- Spouse: Charlotte Day (1835–1839); Katherine Mary Barter (1846–1892)
- Children: 13
- Education: Christ Church, Oxford

Charles Wordsworth (22 August 1806 – 5 December 1892) was Bishop of St Andrews, Dunkeld and Dunblane in Scotland. He was a classical scholar, and taught at public schools in England and Scotland. He was a rower, cricketer, and athlete and he instigated both the University cricket match in 1826 and the Oxford and Cambridge Boat Race in 1829.

== Early life and education ==
Wordsworth was born in Lambeth, the son of the Rev. Christopher Wordsworth and a nephew of the poet William Wordsworth. His father was a divine and scholar. He was educated at Harrow where his friends included Charles Merivale and Richard Chenevix Trench. He was in the Harrow cricket eleven for the first regular matches with Eton (1822) and Winchester (1825), He then went to Christ Church, Oxford where he won the Chancellor's Latin verse at Oxford in 1827, and the Latin essay in 1831, and took a in classics. Through his continued contact with Merivale at Cambridge University, he is credited with bringing about the first Oxford and Cambridge match in 1827, in which he captained Oxford and took seven wickets. Again with Merivale and his Cambridge contacts he instigated the first university boat race in 1829. He played in the Varsity match in 1829 and rowed in the winning Oxford crew in the Boat Race. In 1869 Wordsworth responded to John Morgan, who was investigating the health effects of rowing.

The subject upon which you have written to me is one in which I naturally take a more than common interest. Not only was I one of the Oxford Crew in the first Inter-University Boat-Race in 1829, but the Race was entirely set up by me, owing to the fact that though I was myself at Christ Church, Oxford, my home was at Cambridge (my father being Master of Trinity), and I had a large acquaintance there, and some-times (especially in Easter vacations) was invited to pull in one of their boats, e. g. that of St John's, in which were the now Bishops, Selwyn and Tyrrell, and Charles Merivale the historian, all now vigorous and flourishing. I may also mention, as bearing upon your enquiry, that as soon as my father heard that I had been chosen one of the Oxford Eight, and was practising for the Race, he wrote me an earnest letter, in which he desired me not to row any more, simply from anxiety lest my health should suffer. Though I was always much given to athletic exercises, even before I went to Harrow (where I was one of the Eleven in the first Matches against Eton, for four years, 1822–1825), my constitution was in some respects rather a delicate one. When I received his letter I went at once to my physician, told him the difficulty in which I was placed, begged him to examine my state of health, and got his authority to assure my father that so far as he could judge, rowing had not done me any harm. By this my father was satisfied, and I was allowed to go on. The Race itself, which was at Henley (two miles up stream), certainly did me no harm, though at the time I was incommoded by the change to an unusual diet, — under-done beefsteaks, porter, dry bread, no butter, no tea, no vegetables. After the Race, which was on Wednesday or Tuesday (I think), I was able to play cricket, as one of the Eleven also, against Cambridge on the following Friday. The match was at Oxford. We were victorious on both occasions.

(The University cricket match took place on 5 and 6 June and the Boat Race on 10 June.)

== Teaching career ==
From 1830 to 1833 Wordsworth was teaching and had as pupils a number of men, including William Gladstone and Cardinal Manning. He then travelled abroad during 1833–1834, and after a year as tutor at Christ Church (1834–1835) was appointed second master at Winchester College. He had previously taken holy orders, though he only became priest in 1840, and he had a strong religious influence with the boys.

In 1839 he brought out his Greek Grammar, which had a great success. In 1846, however, he resigned; and then accepted the wardenship of Trinity College, Glenalmond, the new Scottish Episcopal public school and divinity college, where he remained from 1847 to 1854, having great educational success in all respects; though his views on Scottish Church questions brought him into opposition at some important points to Gladstone.

== Ecclesiastical career ==
In 1852 Wordsworth was elected Bishop of St Andrews, Dunkeld and Dunblane, and was consecrated in Aberdeen early next year. He was a strong supporter of the establishment, but conciliatory towards the Free churches, and this brought him into a good deal of controversy. He was a voluminous writer, and was one of the company of revisers of the New Testament (1870–1881), among whom he displayed a conservative tendency.

In 1864 his book On Shakspeare's Knowledge and Use of the Bible was published in London.

In continuing his letter to Morgan, Wordsworth described his activities in 1869.

For myself, I am now in my 63rd year, yet my constitution is not seriously impaired, as you may conclude when I mention that I still am able to skate, to play at cricket occasionally with my sons, and that last year I rowed with them upon the Tay, a distance of eight miles, as stroke of a Four-oar? Nor when I think of others whom I knew as a young man at both Universities, can I remember any instance of injury being done to the health which could fairly be set down to the exercise of rowing as then practised. It is true we used to be told, even in those days, that no man in a Racing-Boat could expect to live to the age of thirty.

== Later life ==
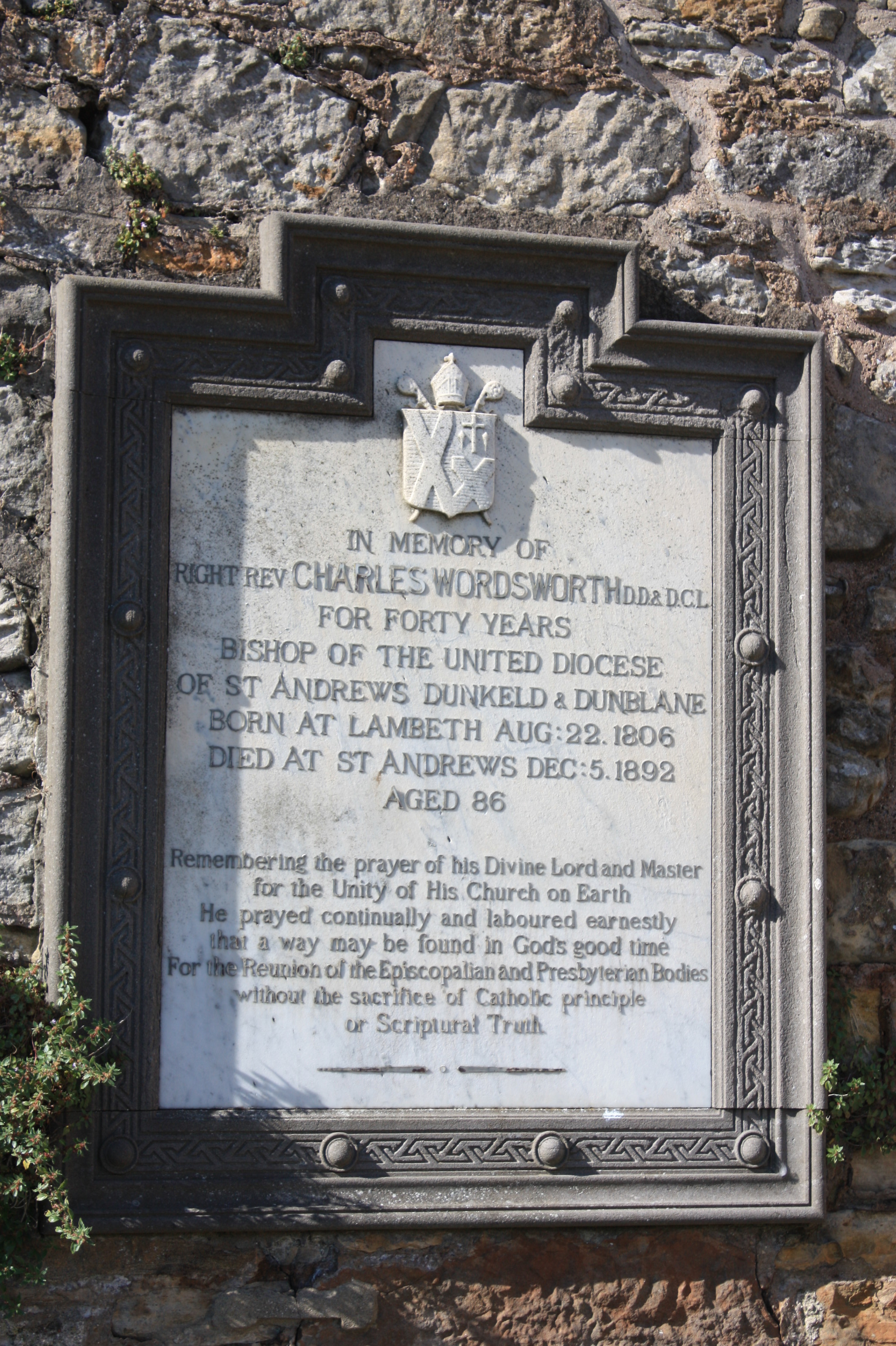
The grave of Charles Wordsworth, Eastern Cemetery, St Andrews

Wordsworth died in St Andrews and is buried in the Eastern Cemetery against the north wall (which backs onto the cathedral grounds).

== Family ==
Wordsworth was twice married, first in 1835 to Charlotte Day (d. 1839), and secondly in 1846 to Katherine Mary Barter (d. 1897). He had thirteen children altogether. He was the older brother of Christopher Wordsworth, Bishop of Lincoln.

See his Annals of my Early Life (1891), and Annals of My Life, edited by W Earl Hodgson (1893); also The Episcopate of Charles Wordsworth, by his nephew John Wordsworth, Bishop of Salisbury (1899).

== See also ==
- List of Oxford University Boat Race crews

== Notes ==
Religious titles
Preceded by Patrick Torry	Bishop of St Andrews, Dunkeld and Dunblane; 1853–1892	Succeeded by George Howard Wilkinson
