= Christopher Wordsworth =

English intellectual and bishop

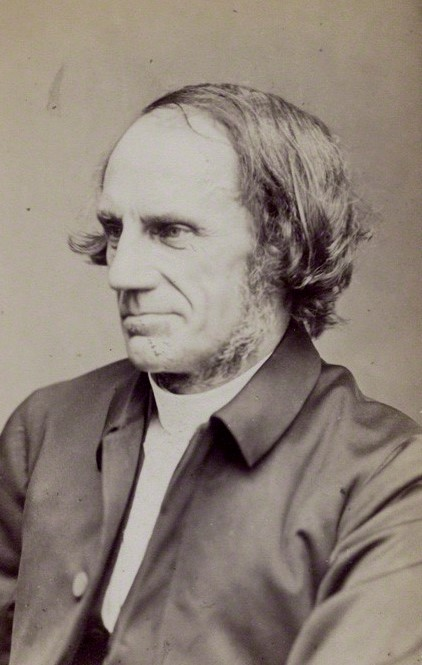
- Born: 30 October 1807
- Died: 20 March 1885 (aged 77)
- Occupation: Bishop
- Spouse: Susanna Hartley Frere (m. 1838)
- Children: 7
- Parent(s): Christopher Wordsworth & Priscilla Lloyd
- Relatives: John Wordsworth (brother); Charles Wordsworth (brother)

Christopher Wordsworth (30 October 1807 – 20 March 1885) was an English intellectual and a bishop of the Church of England.

== Life ==
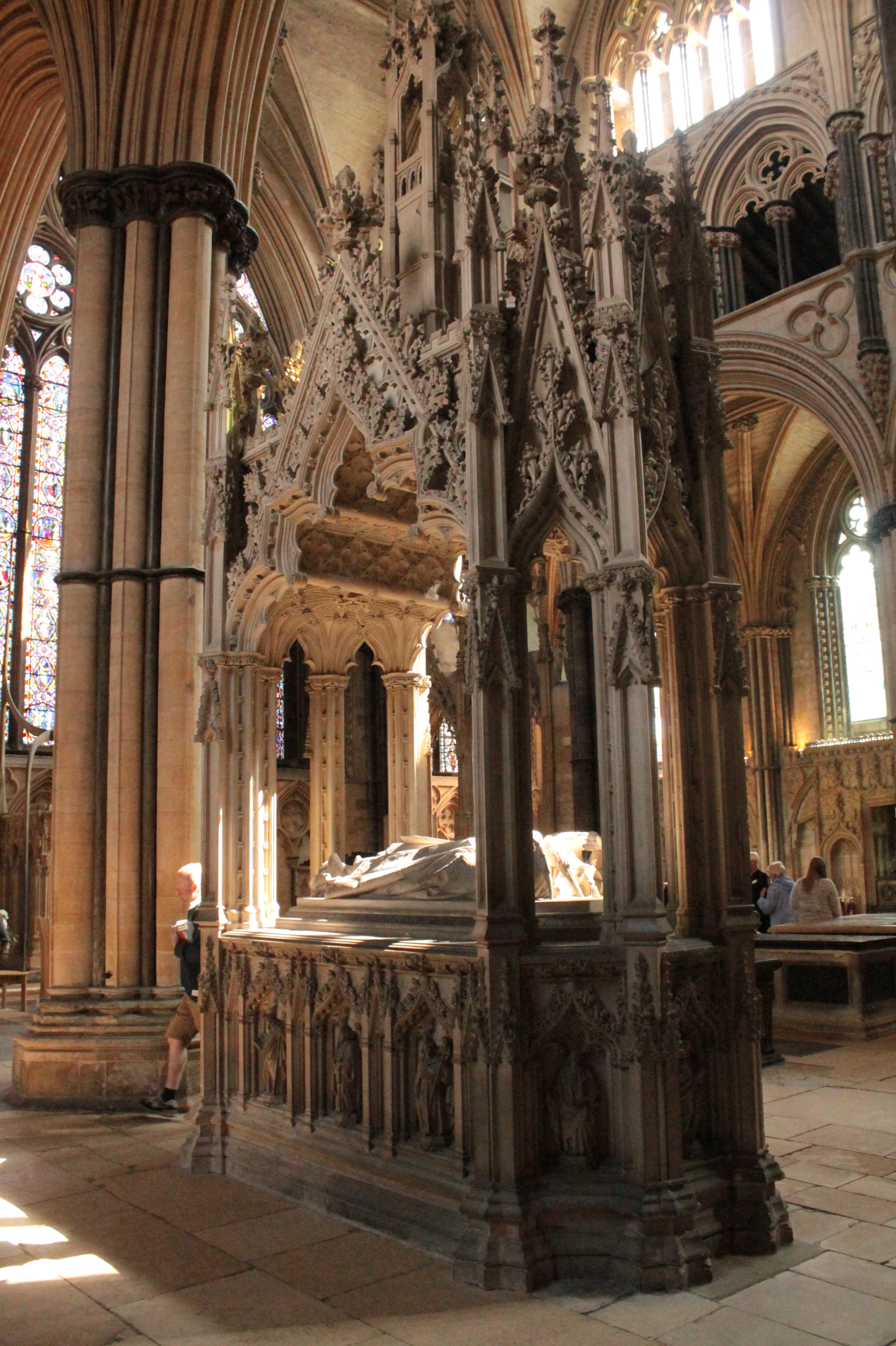
The grave of Bishop Christopher Wordsworth, Lincoln Cathedral

Wordsworth was born in London, the youngest son of Christopher Wordsworth, Master of Trinity, who was the youngest brother of the poet William Wordsworth. Thus, Wordsworth was a nephew of the celebrated poet.

Wordsworth was the younger brother of the classical scholar John Wordsworth and Charles Wordsworth, Bishop of Saint Andrews, Dunkeld and Dunblane. He was educated at Winchester and Trinity, Cambridge. Like his brother Charles, he was distinguished as an athlete as well as for scholarship. He won the Chancellor's Gold Medal for poetry in 1827 and 1828.

He became senior classic, and was elected a fellow and tutor of Trinity in 1830; shortly afterwards he took holy orders. He went for a tour in Greece in 1832–1833, and published various works on its topography and archaeology, the most famous of which is "Wordsworth's" Greece (1839). In 1836 he became Public Orator at Cambridge, and in the same year was appointed Headmaster of Harrow, a post he resigned in 1844. In 1844 Sir Robert Peel appointed him as a Canon of Westminster (1844–1869). He was Vicar of Stanford in the Vale, Berkshire (1850–1869) and Archdeacon of Westminster (1864–1869). In 1869 Benjamin Disraeli appointed him Bishop of Lincoln which he retained until his death in 1885. His election to the See of Lincoln was confirmed at St Mary-le-Bow on 22 February 1869 (whereby he legally became Bishop of Lincoln) and he was ordained and consecrated a bishop at Westminster Abbey on 24 February by Archibald Campbell Tait, Archbishop of Canterbury; George Selwyn, Bishop of New Zealand; and six other prelates.

According to the Encyclopædia Britannica Eleventh Edition, he was a man of fine character, with a high ideal of ecclesiastical duty, and he spent his money generously on church objects.

He is buried near the Shrine of St Hugh in Lincoln Cathedral.

== Works ==
As a scholar he is best known for his edition of the Greek New Testament (1856–1860), and the Old Testament (1864–1870), with commentaries; but his writings were many in number, and included a volume of devotional verse, The Holy Year (1862), Church History up to A.D. 451 (1881–1883), and Memoirs of his uncle, William Wordsworth (1851), to whom he was literary executor. His Inscriptiones Pompeianae (1837) was an important contribution to epigraphy. He also wrote several hymns (Hymns Ancient and Modern New Standard contains seven) of which perhaps the best known is the Easter hymn 'Alleluia, Alleluia, hearts to heaven and voices raise'. His daughter Elizabeth Wordsworth worked as his research assistant for his publications and as his secretary, before becoming founding Principal of Lady Margaret Hall, Oxford.

With William Cooke, a Canon of Chester, Wordsworth edited for the Henry Bradshaw Society the early 15th-century Ordinale Sarum of Clement Maydeston, but the work did not appear in print until 1901, several years after the death of both editors.

=== Books ===
- Athens and Attica, 1836
- Inscriptiones Pompeianae: or, Specimens and facsimiles of ancient inscriptions discovered on the walls of buildings at Pompeii, 1837
- Greece, Pictorial, Descriptive, and Historical, 1839
- Theophilus Anglicanus: or, Manual of instruction on the Church and the Anglican branch of it, 1843
- On the Canon of the Scriptures, 1848
- Lectures on the Apocalypse, 1849
- Memoirs of William Wordsworth, 1851
- Commentary on the Whole Bible, 1856–70
- The Holy Year; or Hymns for Sundays and Holydays Throughout the Year, and for Other Occasions, 1863
- Church History, 1881–83
- The New Testament ... in the Original Greek: With Notes by C. Wordsworth. [With] an Index to the Introductions and Notes, by John Twycross, 2 volumes
- Ordinale Sarum, sive Directorium Sacerdotum (Liber quem Pica Sarum vulgo vocitat clerus) (Henry Bradshaw Society, 1901), ed., with William Cooke

=== Hymns ===
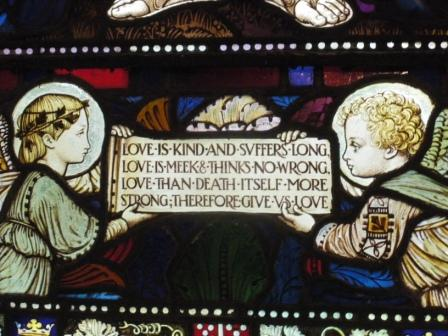
A verse from Gracious Spirit, Holy Ghost incorporated into a stained glass window

- Alleluia! Alleluia! Hearts to Heaven and Voices Raise
- Arm These Thy Soldiers, Mighty Lord
- Father of All, from Land and Sea
- Gracious Spirit, Holy Ghost
- Hallelujah! Christ Is Risen
- Hark! the Sound of Holy Voices
- Heav'nly Father, Send Thy Blessing
- Holy, Holy, Holy Lord
- Lord, Be Thy Word My Rule
- O Day of Rest and Gladness
- O Lord of Heaven and Earth and Sea
- O Lord, Our Strength in Weakness
- See, the Conqueror Mounts in Triumph (set by Hubert Parry as "Rustington" in 1897)
- Sing, O Sing, This Blessed Morn
- Songs of Thankfulness and Praise
- The Day Is Gently Sinking to a Close
- The Grave Itself a Garden Is
- Thine for ever! Thine for ever!

== Family ==
In 1838 Wordsworth married Susanna Hartley Frere (d. 1884) and they had seven children. The elder son, John (1843–1911), was Bishop of Salisbury, founder of Bishop Wordsworth's School, Salisbury, and author of Fragments of Early Latin (1874); their eldest daughter, Dame Elizabeth (1840–1932), was the first principal (in 1879) of Lady Margaret Hall, Oxford and the founder (in 1886) of St Hugh's College. His daughter Dora married Edward Tucker Leeke, Canon and sub-dean of Lincoln Cathedral. His younger son Christopher (1848–1938) was a noted liturgical scholar.

His Life, by J. H. Overton and Elizabeth Wordsworth, was published in 1888.

Church of England titles
Preceded by John Jackson	Bishop of Lincoln; 1869 – 1885	Succeeded by Edward King
Academic offices
Preceded by Charles Longley	Head Master of Harrow School; 1836-1844	Succeeded by Charles John Vaughan
