= Elizabeth Wordsworth =

Founding principal of Lady Margaret Hall, Oxford

Dame Elizabeth Wordsworth DBE
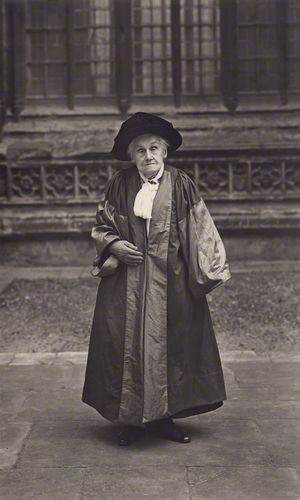
- Wordsworth in 1928
- Born: 22 June 1840; Harrow on the Hill, London, England
- Died: 30 November 1932 (aged 92); Oxford, England
- Occupations: College leader, founder and writer
- Writing career
- Pen name: Grant Lloyd
- Subject: Biography

Dame Elizabeth Wordsworth DBE (22 June 1840 – 30 November 1932) was founding Principal of Lady Margaret Hall, Oxford and she funded and founded St Hugh's College. She was also an author, sometimes writing under the name Grant Lloyd.

== Life ==
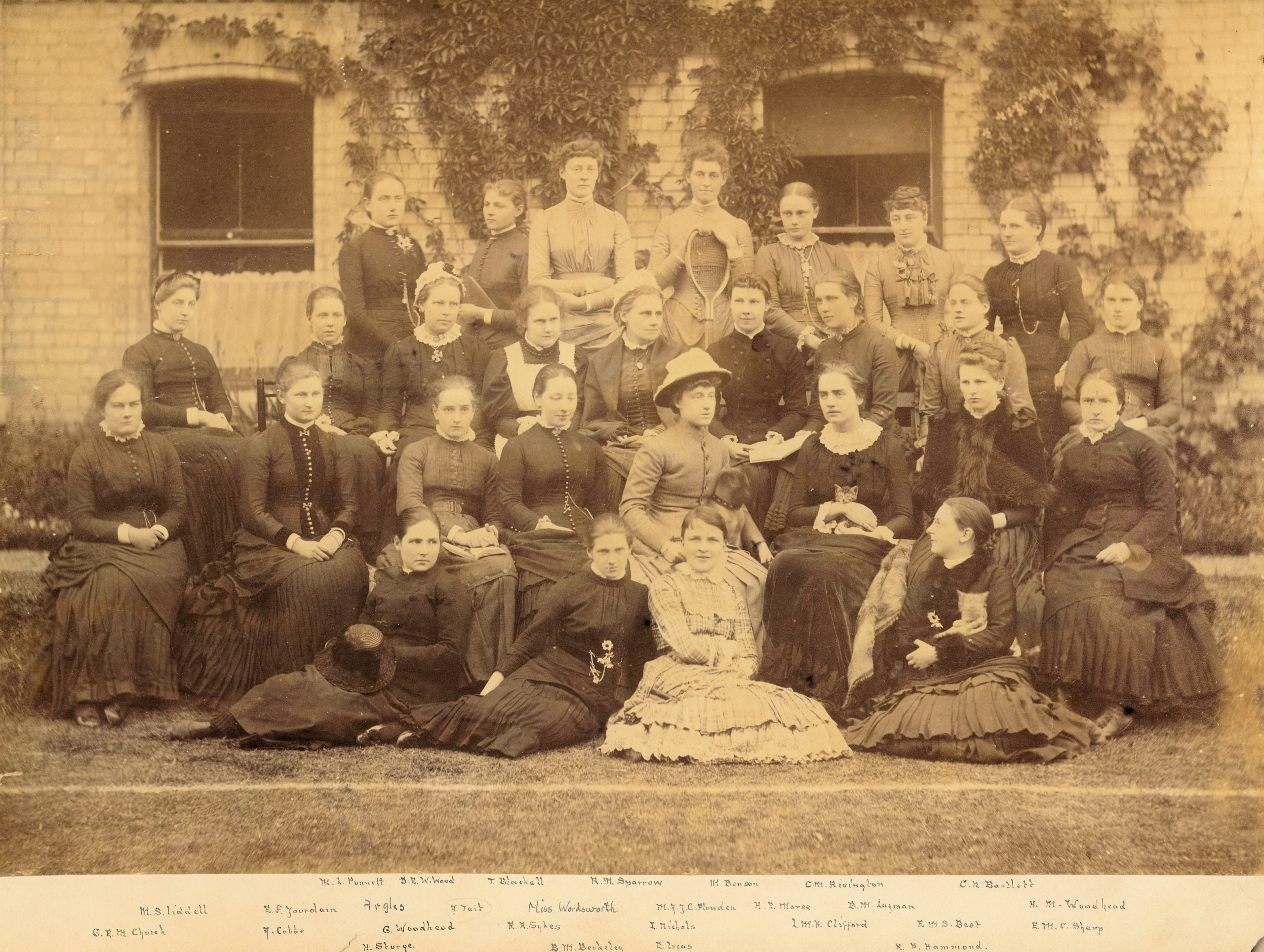
Principal and Fellows of Lady Margaret Hall

Wordsworth was born in 1840 at Harrow on the Hill. Her mother was Susanna Hatley Frere and her father Christopher Wordsworth was a headmaster and later the Bishop of Lincoln. Her brothers were John Wordsworth, Bishop of Salisbury, and Christopher Wordsworth, a liturgical scholar. She was the great-niece of the poet William Wordsworth.

She was educated at home and travelled on European family trips; she was brought up in the cloisters of Westminster Abbey and in Stanford in the Vale in Berkshire. She learned several modern languages as well as (self taught) Latin and Greek, though her knowledge of science and mathematics was meagre. She had a "persevering familiarity" with the Greek testament, as well as the Iliad, which she read at the rate of fifty lines a day with the help of a Latin translation.

She was the founding Principal of Lady Margaret Hall, Oxford in 1879 as a college for female undergraduates, on Norham Gardens in North Oxford. She continued in this role until her retirement in 1909, when she was succeeded by Henrietta Jex-Blake.

In 1886, she inherited some money from her father and founded St Hugh's College also in north Oxford as a college for poorer female undergraduates unable to afford the costs of Lady Margaret Hall. Today this is one of the largest colleges in the University of Oxford.

In 1896, she was one of the women who was called to give evidence to the Hebdomadal Council on the question of whether women should be awarded degrees at the University of Oxford, making her one of the first women to appear before this council. She believed that women's education at Oxford should be as close to that of men as possible, although she did not believe in their being entered for University prizes, due to the risk of overstimulation. She received an honorary M.A. from Oxford in 1921, shortly after degrees were opened to women, and an honorary D.C.L. in 1928. She was appointed a Dame Commander of the Order of the British Empire (DBE) in the 1928 Birthday Honours.

She was a prolific author, writing poetry, plays, biographies and religious articles, as well as writing and lecturing on women's education. She published the novels Thornwell Abbas, (two volumes, 1876) and Ebb and Flow, (two volumes, 1883) under the pseudonym of Grant Lloyd. She wrote a song "Good and Clever", which like her books came out of copyright in 2002.

== Works include ==
- Thornwell Abbas, (two volumes, 1876)
- Ebb and Flow, (two volumes, 1883)
- Christopher Wordsworth, Bishop of Lincoln, 1807-1885, with John Henry Overton, (1888)
- William Wordsworth, (1891)

== See also ==
- Madeleine Shaw Lefevre, Wordsworth's counterpart at Somerville Hall.
