= Christopher Wordsworth (divine) =

English divine and scholar

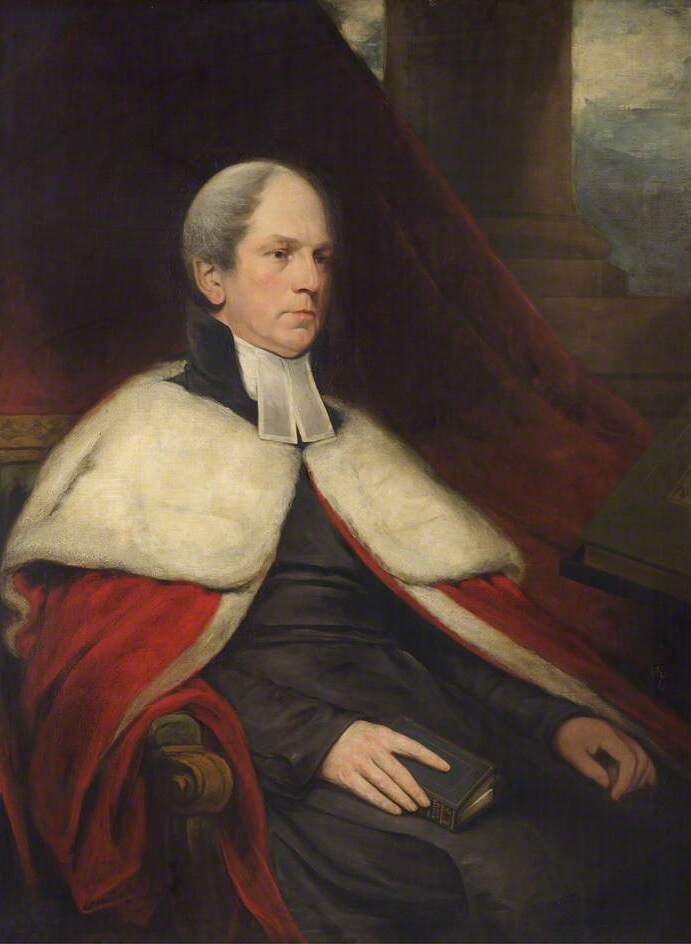

Master of Trinity College
- In office 1820–1841
- Preceded by: William Lort Mansel
- Succeeded by: William Whewell

Personal details
- Born: 9 June 1774 Cockermouth, Cumberland, England
- Died: 2 February 1846 (aged 71) Buxted, East Sussex, England
- Spouse: Priscilla Lloyd (m. 1804; died 1815)
- Children: John Wordsworth; Charles Wordsworth; Christopher Wordsworth
- Relatives: William Wordsworth (brother); Dorothy Wordsworth (sister)
- Occupation: Divine and scholar

Christopher Wordsworth (9 June 1774 – 2 February 1846) was an English divine and scholar.

== Life ==
Born in Cockermouth, Cumberland, he was the youngest brother of the poet William Wordsworth, and was educated at Trinity College, Cambridge, where he became a fellow in 1798.

Twelve years later he received the degree of DD. He took holy orders, and obtained successive preferments through the patronage of Charles Manners-Sutton, Bishop of Norwich, afterwards (1805) Archbishop of Canterbury, to whose son Charles (afterwards Speaker of the House of Commons, and Viscount Canterbury) he had been tutor. He had in 1802 attracted attention by his defence of Granville Sharp's then novel canon "on the uses of the definitive article" in New Testament textual criticism.

In 1810 he published an Ecclesiastical Biography in 6 volumes. On the death of Bishop Mansel, in 1820, he was elected Master of Trinity, and retained that position till 1841, when he resigned. He is regarded as the father of the modern "classical tripos," since he had, as vice-chancellor, originated in 1821 a proposal for a public examination in classics and divinity, which, though then rejected, bore fruit in 1822. Otherwise his mastership was undistinguished, and he was not a popular head with the college. He died on 2 February 1846, at Buxted, East Sussex.

In his Who wrote Eikon Basilike? (1824), and in other writings, he advocated the claims of Charles I to its authorship; and in 1836 he published, in 4 volumes, a work of Christian Institutes, selected from English divines. In 1804 he married Priscilla Lloyd (d. 1815), a sister of both Anna Braithwaite and Charles Lamb's friend Charles Lloyd; they had three sons: John, Charles, and Christopher.

== Notes ==
Academic offices
| Preceded by William Lort Mansel | Master of Trinity College, Cambridge; 1820–1841 | Succeeded by William Whewell |
