= John Burton =

John Burton may refer to:

== Religion ==
- John Burton (archdeacon of Cleveland) (fl. 1685–1700), Anglican priest
- John Burton (minister) (1760–1838), Nova Scotia Baptist minister
- John Burton (provost) (fl. 1871–1885), Episcopalian Provost of St Ninian's Cathedral, Perth

== Sports ==
- John Burton (canoeist) (born 1947), American slalom canoer
- John Burton (footballer, born 1863) (1863–1914), English footballer with Aston Villa
- John Burton (footballer, born 1875) (1875–1949), English footballer with Derby County, Tottenham, Preston North End, West Ham.
- John Burton (footballer, born 1885) (1885–1938), English footballer with West Ham United, Birmingham and Cardiff City
- John Burton (golfer) (1903–1973), English golfer
- John Burton (Kent cricketer) (1837–1887)
- John Burton (sportsman) (1925–2010), New Zealand cricketer and rugby union player
- John C. Burton (1923–2014), American cross country skier

== Politics ==
- John Burton (fl. 1376–1390) (died by 1395), MP for Nottinghamshire
- John Burton (fl. 1401), MP for Nottinghamshire
- John Burton (fl. 1407), MP for Huntingdonshire
- John Burton (American politician) (1932–2025), American congressman, California State Senator, and California Democratic Party Chairman
- John Burton (Canadian politician) (1927–2022), Canadian member of parliament
- John Burton (mayor) (1910–1992), American politician who served as mayor of Ypsilanti, Michigan
- John Burton (MP for Bristol) (died 1455), MP for Bristol
- John Burton (political agent) (1940–2026), British constituency agent of British Prime Minister Tony Blair
- John T. Burton (c. 1808–1880), newspaper publisher and politician in Newfoundland

== Others ==
- John Burton (actor) (born 1967), British stage and television actor
- John Burton (antiquary) (1710–1771), English antiquary and physician
- John Burton (conservationist) (1944–2022), co-founder of the nonprofit environmental organization World Land Trust
- John Burton (diplomat) (John Wear Burton, 1915–2010), Australian public servant, diplomat and academic
- John Burton (scholar) (1696–1771), English theological and classical scholar
- John Bloundelle-Burton (1850–1917), English novelist
- John H. Burton (1857–1887), American architect
- John Hill Burton (1809–1881), Scottish historian, jurist, economist and Historiographer Royal
- John W. Burton (film producer) (1906–1978), American animation cinematographer and producer

== See also ==
- Jon Burton, video game designer
- Jonathan Burton (disambiguation)
- Jack Burton (disambiguation)
