= Alexander Grier =

Alexander Roy MacGregor Grier (usually known as Roy M. Grier; 8 May 1877 – 1 February 1940) was an eminent Anglican priest and schoolmaster in the first half of the 20th century.

Born in 1877, Grier was educated at Denstone College and the University of Oxford, where he read history. From university Grier became a schoolmaster at Worksop College in 1900 and was ordained in 1903. He became headmaster of Worksop in 1905 and carried out a large and expensive building programme, including the construction of a new chapel. Between 1915 and 1919 he was headmaster of Bloxham School, successfully guiding the school through the First World War. He then became headmaster of his old school (1919–31) before becoming the Rural Dean of Switzerland in 1931. Grier then worked as Provost of St Ninian's Cathedral, Perth from 1936 to 1940, when he died.

His son Anthony MacGregor Grier was born on 12 April 1911.

Religious titles
Preceded by Hubert Mitchell Rankin	Provost of St Ninian's Cathedral, Perth; 1936 –1940	Succeeded by James Lumsden Barkway
