= David Chillingworth =

Anglican bishop (born 1951)

The Right Reverend David Chillingworth
- Primus Emeritus of the Scottish Episcopal Church
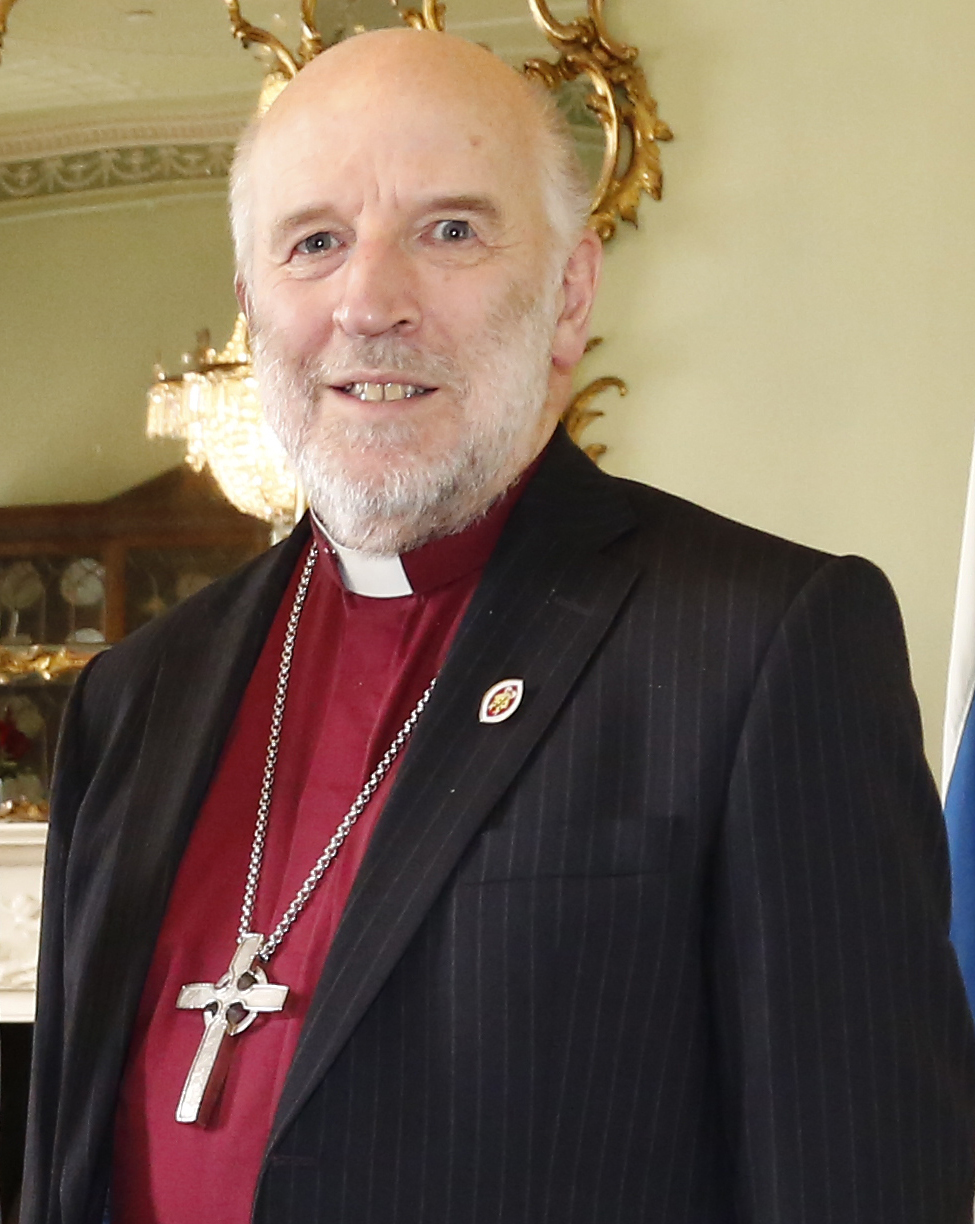
- Chillingworth in 2014
- Church: Scottish Episcopal Church
- Diocese: St Andrews, Dunkeld and Dunblane
- In office: 13 June 2009 – 27 June 2016
- Predecessor: Idris Jones
- Successor: Mark Strange
- Other post: Bishop of St Andrews, Dunkeld and Dunblane (2004–2017)

Orders
- Ordination: 1976
- Consecration: 5 March 2004 by Bruce Cameron

Personal details
- Born: David Chillingworth; 23 June 1951 (age 75) Dublin, Ireland
- Denomination: Anglican
- Spouse: Alison
- Children: 3
- Education: Trinity College, Dublin; Oriel College, Oxford; Ripon College Cuddesdon

David Robert Chillingworth (born 23 June 1951) is an Anglican bishop. He was Bishop of St Andrews, Dunkeld and Dunblane between 2004 and 2017, until his retirement. He was also the Primus of the Scottish Episcopal Church from 2009 to 2016.

== Early life and education ==
Chillingworth was born in Dublin in 1951 but grew up in Northern Ireland. He was educated at Portora Royal School and the Royal Belfast Academical Institution. He studied classics at Trinity College, Dublin, and graduated with a Bachelor of Arts (BA) degree in 1973. He then studied theology at Oriel College, Oxford, and graduated from the University of Oxford with a BA degree in 1975. That year, he entered Ripon College Cuddesdon, an Anglican theological college, to undertake one year of training for ordained ministry.

== Ordained ministry ==
Chillingworth was ordained in the Church of Ireland as a deacon in 1976 and as a priest in 1978. His parish ministry was consistently focused on issues of conflict and reconciliation, particularly in relation to sectarianism. He also served as the Church of Ireland Youth Officer from 1979 to 1983. Before moving to Scotland in 2005 he was the rector for 19 years of Seagoe Parish Church in Portadown and Archdeacon of Dromore and from 1995 to 2002 the Dean of Dromore.

=== Episcopal ministry ===
On 5 March 2004, Chillingworth was consecrated as a bishop at St Ninian's Cathedral, Perth. He then became the bishop of the Diocese of St Andrews, Dunkeld and Dunblane, making him one of the seven diocesan bishops of the Scottish Episcopal Church. Although it is not uncommon for the Scottish Episcopal Church to elect bishops from outside the boundaries of Scotland, the choice of Chillingworth was unusual in that he was elected from the Church of Ireland. He had never previously worked in Scotland and had lived most of his life in Northern Ireland.

On 13 June 2009, Chillingworth was elected the Primus of the Scottish Episcopal Church by the other bishops. The post of primus is held in addition to being a diocesan bishop. He supported same sex marriage and this was introduced to the church following a successful vote to remove the definition of marriage as between a man and a woman from the Canon on Marriage in 2017. He stepped down as Bishop of St Andrews, Dunkeld & Dunblane and as Primus of the Scottish Episcopal Church at the end of July 2017.

Since 2018, he has held permission to officiate in the Diocese of Edinburgh.

== Personal life ==
Chillingworth is married to Alison. Together, they have three children: one daughter, and two sons.

Religious titles
Preceded by Michael Harry George Henley	Bishop of St Andrews, Dunkeld and Dunblane; 2004 to 2017	Succeeded by Ian Paton
Preceded by Idris Jones	Primus of the Scottish Episcopal Church; 2009 to 2016	Succeeded by Mark Strange
