= Edward Reid (bishop) =

Scottish Anglican bishop

The Right Reverend Edward Reid FSA
- Bishop of St Andrews, Dunkeld and Dunblane
- Church: Scottish Episcopal Church
- Diocese: St Andrews, Dunkeld and Dunblane
- In office: 1931-1938
- Predecessor: Charles Plumb
- Successor: Lumsden Barkway
- Previous post: Bishop of Glasgow and Galloway (1921-1931)

Orders
- Ordination: 1899 by John Dowden
- Consecration: 24 June 1921 by Walter Robberds

Personal details
- Born: 12 December 1871 Glasgow, Scotland
- Died: 27 July 1938 (aged 66) Auchterarder, Perthshire, Scotland
- Denomination: Anglican
- Parents: James Reid
- Spouse: Ethel Shaw Macpherson (m. 1899)
- Children: 5
- Education: University of Glasgow

Edward Thomas Scott Reid (12 December 1871 – 27 July 1938) was a Scottish Anglican bishop who ministered in the Scottish Episcopal Church.

== Early life and education ==
Reid was born on 12 December 1871 and educated at Fettes College, the University of Edinburgh, the University of Glasgow (Master of Arts 1895, Doctor of Divinity 1922) and the Edinburgh Theological College (1895).

== Ordained ministry ==
Reid was ordained deacon in 1897 and priest in 1899. His first post was a curacy at Old Saint Paul's, Edinburgh after which, in 1900, he became curate at St Mary's Cathedral, Edinburgh, and in 1901 Second Chaplain of the same cathedral. Later, in 1903, he became Rector of St Cuthbert's, Hawick, and then of St Bride's Church in Glasgow in 1910. In 1920 he was appointed Dean of Glasgow and Galloway.

=== Bishop ===
Reid was elected Bishop of Glasgow and Galloway in 1921 and was consecrated on 24 June 1921 at St Mary's Cathedral, Glasgow, by Walter Robberds. In 1931 he was translated to St Andrews, Dunkeld and Dunblane and died in post on 27 July 1938.

== Notes ==
Scottish Episcopal Church titles
Preceded by Archibald Ean Campbell	Bishop of Glasgow and Galloway; 1921–1931	Succeeded by John Russell Darbyshire
Preceded by Charles Edward Plumb	Bishop of St Andrews, Dunkeld and Dunblane; 1931–1938	Succeeded by James Lumsden Barkway
