= Norman Johnson (priest) =

Norman Johnson (1804-1890) was an Anglican priest in the second half of the 19th century.

He was born in 1804 at Newry and educated at Trinity College, Dublin. Ordained in 1833, he was the incumbent at Kirkcaldy from 1840; Domestic Chaplain to the Countess of Rothes from 1859 and Dean of St Andrews, Dunkeld and Dunblane from 1880. He died on 18 September 1890.

Religious titles
Preceded by John Torry	Dean of St Andrews, Dunkeld and Dunblane; 1880 –1890	Succeeded by Vincent Lewis Rorison
