= Bishop of St Andrews, Dunkeld and Dunblane =

Diocesan bishop in the Scottish Episcopal Church

- Bishopric

anglican
- Incumbent: Ian Paton

Location
- Ecclesiastical province: Scotland

Information
- Established: 1837; renamed 1844
- Diocese: St Andrews, Dunkeld and Dunblane
- Cathedral: St Ninian's, Perth

The Bishop of St Andrews, Dunkeld and Dunblane is the Ordinary of the Scottish Episcopal Diocese of St Andrews, Dunkeld and Dunblane. The see is located at St Ninian's Cathedral in Perth, Scotland.

Following the Glorious Revolution, the Church of Scotland abolished the Episcopacy in 1689 and adopted a Presbyterian government. The Episcopalian remnant slowly formed the independent Scottish Episcopal Church. In the 19th century, the three dioceses were gradually merged to become the present Diocese of St Andrews, Dunkeld and Dunblane. The Right Reverend David Chillingworth retired as bishop at the end of July 2017. An electoral synod to elect a bishop to succeed him was not convened until 2 June 2018, when it elected Ian Paton, Rector of Old St Paul's, Edinburgh. He was consecrated and installed as bishop during a service at St Ninian's Cathedral, Perth, on 20 October 2018 and is still in office.

== List of Office holders ==
=== Archbishops of St Andrews ===
Archbishops of St Andrews
From	Until	Incumbent	Notes
1684	1704	Arthur Rose	Translated from Glasgow; deprived of his temporalities in 1689; continued informally as the Episcopalian primate until his death on 13 June 1704
1704	1731	See vacant	
In 1731, the Archbishopric was abolished and renamed Fife

=== Bishops of Fife ===
Bishops of Fife
From	Until	Incumbent	Notes
1731	1733	James Rose	Consecrated a college bishop in 1726; died 4 April 1733
1733	1743	Robert Keith	Also Bishop of Caithness, Orkney and The Isles 1731–57; and Primus 1743–57.
1743	1761	Robert White	Translated from Dunblane; also Primus 1757–61; died 16 August 1761.
1762	1765	Henry Edgar	Formerly Coadjutor Bishop of Fife 1759–62; died 22 August 1765.
1765	1807	See vacant	
1807	1830	See administered by Daniel Sandford, Bishop of Edinburgh.	
1830	1837	See administered by James Walker, Bishop of Edinburgh.	
In 1837, Fife became part of the united diocese of Fife, Dunkeld and Dunblane.

=== Bishops of Fife, Dunkeld and Dunblane ===
Bishops of Fife, Dunkeld and Dunblane
From	Until	Incumbent	Notes
1837	1844	Patrick Torry	Consecrated Bishop of Dunkeld and Dunblane in 1808; became Bishop of Fife, Dunkeld and Dunblane in 1837, and subsequently Bishop of St Andrews, Dunkeld and Dunblane in 1844.
In 1844, the See was renamed St Andrews, Dunkeld and Dunblane

=== Bishops of St Andrews, Dunkeld and Dunblane ===
Bishops of St Andrews, Dunkeld and Dunblane
From	Until	Incumbent	Notes
1844	1852	Patrick Torry	Died in office on 3 October 1852
1853	1892	Charles Wordsworth	Died in office on 5 December 1892
1893	1907	George Wilkinson	translated from Truro; also Primus 1904-07; died 1 December 1907
1908	1930	Charles Edward Plumb	Died in office on 26 November 1930
1931	1938	Edward Reid	Translated from Glasgow and Galloway; died 27 July 1938
1939	1949	Lumsden Barkway	Translated from Bedford; retired; died 12 December 1968
1950	1955	Brian Burrowes	Retired in 1955; died 15 November 1963
1955	1969	John Howe	Executive Officer of the Anglican Communion 1969-71; Secretary General, Anglican Consultative Council 1971-82, Research Fellow 1983-85; retired 1985; Assistant Bishop, Ripon 1985-91; died 26 April 2001.
1969	1994	Michael Hare Duke	Retired; died 15 December 2014
1994	2004	Michael Henley	Retired; died 21 March 2014
2004	2017	David Chillingworth	Formerly Rector of Seagoe Parish, Portadown, and Archdeacon of Dromore., also Primus from 2009.
2018		Ian Paton	Elected and consecrated 2018.

== See also ==
- Archbishop of St Andrews, the pre-Reformation and Church of Scotland Archbishop.
- Archbishop of St. Andrews and Edinburgh, the current Roman Catholic Archbishop.
- Lists of office-holders
