= Charles Plumb =

Charles Plumb may refer to:

- Charles Plumb (bishop) (1864–1930), British Anglican bishop
- Charles Plumb (cartoonist) (1899–1982), American cartoonist known for drawing the strip Ella Cinders
- Charles Henry Plumb, Baron Plumb, British politician and farmer
