= Pat Smythe (priest) =

Patrick Murray "Pat" Smythe (24 March 1860 – 19 March 1935) was an Anglican priest in the second quarter of the 20th century. He was born into a clerical family on 24 March 1860 and educated at Charterhouse and Keble College, Oxford.

Ordained in 1883, he was initially a curate at St Mark's, Swindon and then held incumbencies at Rockingham, Westbury and Kettering before being appointed Provost of St Ninian's Cathedral, Perth in 1911, a post he held for 24 years.

A great angler, he died on 19 March 1935, at age 74.

Religious titles
Preceded by Charles Edward Plumb	Provost of St Ninian’s Cathedral, Perth; 1911 –1935	Succeeded by Hubert Mitchell Rankin
