= George Farquhar (priest) =

Anglican priest and author

George Taylor Shillito Farquhar (25 February 1857 – 30 July 1927) was an Anglican priest and author in the late 19th and early 20th centuries.

He was educated at Keble College, Oxford, and ordained in 1881. He was Precentor of St Ninian's Cathedral, Perth after which he was Dean of St Andrews, Dunkeld and Dunblane until his death on 30 July 1927.

In 1890, George Farquhar published a book of sonnets.

== Bibliography ==
- George T.S. Farquhar, Sonnets, Perth 1890.

Anglican Communion titles
Preceded by Vincent Lewis Rorison	Dean of St Andrews, Dunkeld and Dunblane; 1910 –1927	Succeeded by James Walker Harper
