= Gwyther =

Gwyther is a surname. Notable people with the surname include:

- Christine Gwyther (born 1959), Welsh politician
- Dave Gwyther (born 1948), Welsh footballer
- Elwyn Gwyther (1921–1996), Welsh rugby union and rugby league footballer
- William Gwyther (1866–1940), Scottish Anglican priest
