= Brian Burrowes =

The Right Reverend Brian Burrowes OBE(Mil.)
- Bishop of St Andrews, Dunkeld and Dunblane
- Church: Scottish Episcopal Church
- Diocese: St Andrews, Dunkeld and Dunblane
- In office: 1950–1955
- Predecessor: Lumsden Barkway
- Successor: John Howe

Orders
- Consecration: 1950

Personal details
- Born: 5 October 1896
- Died: 15 November 1963 (aged 67)
- Denomination: Anglican

Arnold Brian Burrowes OBE (5 October 1896 – 15 November 1963) was an eminent bishop in the mid part of the Twentieth century.

== Early life ==
He was born on 5 October 1896 and educated at Wellington and Corpus Christi College, Oxford. His family came from County Cavan.

== Career ==
=== Military service ===
Burrows saw active service during World War I. On 5 August 1916, he was commissioned into the Royal Irish Fusiliers as a second lieutenant (on probation). On 19 April 1917, he was promoted to temporary lieutenant while attached to an officer cadet battalion. He was promoted to lieutenant on 5 February 1918. He was promoted to acting captain on 18 October 1918 and was seconded from his regiment as an Assistant Area Anti-Gas Officer.

On 29 July 1942, he was appointed a temporary military chaplain in the Royal Navy Volunteer Reserve with seniority from 29 July 1941. In the 1946 King's Birthday Honours, he was appointed Officer of the Order of the British Empire (OBE) in recognition of his service during World War II as a Navy chaplain.

=== Religious life ===
He was Fellow, Lecturer, Dean and Chaplain of Pembroke College, Oxford until 1937. He was also a Senior Proctor of the University of Oxford. He then served as Principal of Salisbury Theological College. After serving as a military chaplain during World War II, he was appointed Bishop of St Andrews, Dunkeld and Dunblane in 1950.

Retiring five years later on grounds of ill-health, he died on 15 November 1963 in Elgin, Morayshire. He was buried in Elgin Cemetery, New Elgin, Morayshire.

Religious titles
| Preceded by Lumsden Barkway | Bishop of St Andrews, Dunkeld and Dunblane; 1950–1955 | Succeeded by John Howe |
