= Shillito =

Shillito is a surname. Notable people with the surname include:

- DM Ashura (born William James Robert Shillito, 1986–), American electronic musician
- Alan Shillito, British rugby league player
- John Shillito (1809–1879), American businessperson, founder of the John Shillito Company
- Lisa-Marie Shillito, British archaeologist

== See also ==
- George Farquhar (priest), born George Taylor Shillito Farquhar, British Anglican priest
