= Jack Burton =

Jack Burton may refer to:

- Jack Burton (character), lead character in the film Big Trouble in Little China
- Jack Burton (cricketer) (1923–2001), Australian cricketer
- Jack Burton (equestrian) (1919-2019), American Olympic equestrian

== See also ==
- John Burton (disambiguation)
