= James Harper (priest) =

James Walker Harper (1859-23 June 1938) was an Anglican priest in the late 19th and early 20th centuries.

== Biography ==
He was born in 1859, educated at Aberdeen Grammar School and the city's university and ordained in 1881. After curacies at Holy Trinity Stirling and St Paul's, Edinburgh he held an incumbency at St Margaret's, Leven, Fife. He was Dean of St Andrews, Dunkeld and Dunblane from 1927 until his death on 23 June 1938.

Anglican Communion titles
Preceded by George Taylor Shillito Farquhar	Dean of St Andrews, Dunkeld and Dunblane; 1927–1938	Succeeded by William Clements Gwyther
