= William Gwyther =

Anglican priest (1866–1940)

William Clements Gwyther (19 September 1866 – 22 February 1940) was an Anglican priest.

He was born in London, son of Frederick George Gwyther and Eliza (nee Beattie), and educated at University College School and Keble College, Oxford and ordained in 1895. After curacies at St Margaret Roath and All Saints' Bristol, he was Chaplain of St Ninian's Cathedral, Perth. He was Rector of St James', Dollar and then St Mary's Dunkeld after which he was Dean of St Andrews, Dunkeld and Dunblane from 1938 until his death.

Anglican Communion titles
Preceded by James Walker Harper	Dean of St Andrews, Dunkeld and Dunblane; 1938 –1940	Succeeded by Piers Holt Wilson
