= John Torry =

Scottish Episcopalian dean

John Torrey (27 August 1800 – 15 December 1879) was a Scottish Episcopalian priest who served as Dean of St Andrews, Dunkeld and Dunblane.

The son of Bishop Patrick Torry, he was born in Peterhead and educated at Marischal College. Ordained in 1823, he was the curate at Peterhead and then the incumbent at Coupar-Angus, Meigle, and Alyth for thirty years. He was Dean of St Andrews, Dunkeld and Dunblane from 1839 until his death.

Religious titles
Preceded by Inaugural appointment	Dean of St Andrews, Dunkeld and Dunblane; 1838 –1879	Succeeded by Norman Johnson
