= John Burton (provost) =

Scottish priest

John Burton was an Anglican priest in the 19th century. He was the Provost of St Ninian's Cathedral in Perth, Scotland from 1871 to 1885.

Church of England titles
Preceded by Edward Bowles Knottesford	Provost of St Ninian’s Cathedral, Perth; 1871 – 1885	Succeeded by Vincent Lewis Rorison
