= Archdiocese of St Andrews (disambiguation) =

The Archdiocese of St Andrews was an administrative region of the Catholic Church in Scotland before the abolition of Catholicism there in 1689.

On some occasions, the term may also be used for the following:

- Roman Catholic Archdiocese of St Andrews and Edinburgh, re-established Roman Catholic diocese based in Edinburgh
- Diocese of Saint Andrews, Dunkeld and Dunblane, Episcopalian diocese incorporating the pre-1689 dioceses of Dunkeld and Dunblane, as well as St Andrews
