= Charles Plumb (bishop) =

Scottish bishop

The Right Reverend C. E. Plumb
- Bishop of St Andrews, Dunkeld and Dunblane
- Church: Scottish Episcopal Church
- Diocese: St Andrews, Dunkeld and Dunblane
- In office: 1908–1930
- Predecessor: George Wilkinson
- Successor: Edward Reid

Orders
- Ordination: 1881
- Consecration: 1908

Personal details
- Born: Charles Edward Plumb; 1864
- Died: 26 November 1930 (aged 65–66)
- Denomination: Anglican
- Spouse: Emma Ann Cutting (m. 1904)
- Children: Charles Theodore Plumb 1905 Margaret Helen Mary Plumb 1909
- Education: Magdalen College, Oxford

Charles Edward Plumb (1864–1930) was an Anglican bishop in the first third of the 20th century. He worked as a priest in Church of England; was principal of St Stephen's House, Oxford, an Anglo-Catholic theological college, from 1895 to 1903; then he moved to the Scottish Episcopal Church as provost of St Ninian's Cathedral, Perth; and finally served as Bishop of St Andrews, Dunkeld and Dunblane from 1908 until his death in 1930.

== Biography ==
Plumb was educated at the Royal Grammar School Worcester. He trained for ordination under the Diocese of Lichfield's Probationers' Scheme: this was for men without a degree or the financial mean to support themselves through university could undertake two years supervised lay ministry within a parish and then one intense year of study at Lichfield Theological College. He would go on to attend Magdalen College, Oxford, after his curacy.

He was ordained in the Church of England in 1881. He undertook his curacy at Christ Church, West Bromwich (1888–1890) and in the parish of Witney (1890–1891). He then attended university, studying theology at Magdalen College, Oxford University, and graduated with a first class honours Bachelor of Arts (BA) degree.

He was a tutor at St Aidan's College, Birkenhead for a year during a period where the usually Evangelical college had a high church principal, before becoming principal of St Stephen's House, Oxford in 1895. Additionally, he was chaplain to Magdalen College, Oxford, his alma mater, from 1897 to 1903. He then led a church in France, as chaplain to St Paul's Anglican Church, Cannes, between 1903 and 1906.

Plumb was associated with the Scottish Episcopal Church' St Margaret's Church, Braemar, while it was being built between 1899 and 1907 for English visitors to Braemar and Deeside. He then moved from the Church of England to the Scottish Episcopal Church in 1906, when he was appointed provost of St Ninian's Cathedral, Perth. He ascended to the episcopate as the 4th bishop of St Andrews, Dunkeld and Dunblane in 1908. He was consecrated a bishop on 25 March 1908. He attended the 1920 Lambeth Conference. He died in post on 26 November 1930.

Church of England titles
Preceded by George Grub	Provost of St Ninian’s Cathedral, Perth; 1904 – 1908	Succeeded by Patrick Murray Smythe
Preceded by George Howard Wilkinson	Bishop of St Andrews, Dunkeld and Dunblane; 1908 – 1924	Succeeded by Edward Thomas Scott Reid
Academic offices
Preceded by Hugh Currie	Principal of St Stephen's House, Oxford; 1895–1903	Succeeded by George Bown
