= Ean Campbell =

Scottish Anglican bishop (1856–1921)

The Right Reverend Archibald Ean Campbell
- Bishop of Glasgow and Galloway
- Church: Scottish Episcopal Church
- Diocese: Glasgow and Galloway
- Elected: 8 December 1903
- In office: 1904-1921
- Predecessor: William Harrison
- Successor: Edward Reid

Orders
- Ordination: 1882 by Alfred Ollivant
- Consecration: 24 February 1904 by Alexander Chinnery-Haldane

Personal details
- Born: 1 June 1856 Glasgow, Scotland
- Died: 18 April 1921 (aged 64) Glasgow, Scotland
- Denomination: Anglican
- Parents: Walter Campbell, Anna Henrietta Loring
- Spouse: Helen Anna Brokrick (m. 1885)

Archibald Ean Campbell (1 June 1856 – 18 April 1921) was a Scottish Anglican bishop.

== Early life and education ==
Campbell born on 1 June 1856 in the Carmyle area of Glasgow, the son of Colonel Walter Campbell of Skipness, cousin of the Duke of Argyll and Anna Henrietta Loring. He was educated at King William's College, Clare College, Cambridge, and the Theological College at Cuddesdon. He earned a Bachelor of Arts from Clare College in 1880, a Master of Arts in 1883, a Doctor of Divinity in 1904 and a Doctor of Civil Law in 1910.

== Ordained ministry ==
Campbell was ordained deacon by the Bishop of Oxford, John Mackarness, in 1881, and priest in 1882 by the Bishop of Llandaff, Alfred Ollivant. After a curacy in Aberdare between 1881 and 1885, he became rector of Castle Rising, where he remained until 1891. In 1891, he became vicar of All Souls' Church in Leeds, while between 1901 and 1904 he was provost of St Ninian's Cathedral, Perth.

=== Bishop ===
Campbell was elected as the fifth Bishop of Glasgow and Galloway on 8 December 1903 and was consecrated to the episcopate on 24 February 1904 at St Mary's Cathedral, Glasgow. He died in office on 18 April 1921.

Anglican Communion titles
Preceded by Vincent Lewis Rorison	Provost of St Ninian’s Cathedral, Perth; 1901 – 1904	Succeeded by George Grub
Preceded by William Thomas Harrison	Bishop of Glasgow and Galloway; 1904 – 1921	Succeeded by Edward Thomas Scott Reid
