= John W. Burton =

John W. Burton is the name of:

- John William Burton (born 1845), New Zealand entrepreneur in Burton Brothers photography chain
- John Wear Burton (1915–2010), Australian diplomat and academic
- John W. Burton (film producer) (1906–1978), American film producer and cinematographer

== See also ==
- John Burton (disambiguation)
