= Hubert Rankin =

Hubert Mitchell Rankin was Provost of St Ninian's Cathedral, Perth, for a brief period in 1935. A former Rector of Montrose, he died in 1935. His younger son was John Rankin.

Religious titles
| Preceded by Patrick Murray Smythe | Provost of St Ninian’s Cathedral, Perth; 1935 | Succeeded by James Lumsden Barkway |
