= John Howe (bishop) =

Scottish Anglican bishop

The Right Reverend John Howe
- Bishop of St Andrews, Dunkeld and Dunblane
- Church: Scottish Episcopal Church
- Diocese: St Andrews, Dunkeld and Dunblane
- In office: 1955–1969
- Predecessor: Brian Burrowes
- Successor: Michael Hare Duke
- Other post: Executive Officer of the Anglican Communion/Secretary General, Anglican Consultative Council (1969–1982)

Orders
- Ordination: 1943 (deacon); 1944 (priest)
- Consecration: 1955

Personal details
- Born: 14 July 1920 Goodmayes, London, England
- Died: 26 April 2001 (aged 80)
- Denomination: Anglican
- Education: Durham University

John William Alexander Howe (14 July 1920 – 26 April 2001) was an Anglican bishop, who served as the eighth Bishop of St Andrews, Dunkeld and Dunblane, and became the Secretary-General of the Anglican Consultative Council.

== Education ==
Born in Goodmayes on 14 July 1920 he was educated at Westcliff High School for Boys and Durham University, where he was President of the Durham Union from the Michaelmas term 1942 to the Easter term 1943.

== Career ==
He was ordained deacon in 1943, and priest in 1944, and began his ecclesiastical career as a curate at All Saints, Scarborough. He was chaplain at Adisadel College Gold Coast and then Vice-Principal of Edinburgh Theological College.

In 1955 he was elected to the episcopate, as Bishop of St Andrews, Dunkeld and Dunblane in the Scottish Episcopal Church. He resigned the see in 1969 in order to take up a senior position in London as Executive Officer of the Anglican Communion on 1 May 1969. In that role, Howe was part of establishing the permanent Anglican Consultative Council. In the process, the post of Executive Officer was ended, but at the first meeting of the ACC in 1971, Howe was elected to become the first Secretary General of the Anglican Consultative Council, a substantially similar role in which he served until 31 December 1982.

== Death ==
He died on 26 April 2001, aged 80.

Religious titles
Preceded by Brian Burrowes	Bishop of St Andrews, Dunkeld and Dunblane; 1955– 1969	Succeeded by Michael Hare Duke
