= George Grub =

Scottish church historian

George Grub (1812–1892) was a Scottish law professor and church historian.

== Life ==
Grub was born at Old Aberdeen on 4 April 1812, the only child of George Grub, a respectable citizen and convener of the trades at Old Aberdeen, and his wife, Christian Yolum.

He entered King's College, Aberdeen, at the age of thirteen and a half, and afterwards entered the law-office of Alexander Allan, advocate in Aberdeen, under whom he served the apprenticeship required by the Society of Advocates in Aberdeen. Passing as advocate in 1836, he was in 1841 appointed librarian to the society and he held this post until his death. In 1843 he became lecturer on Scots law in Marischal College, Aberdeen, and for forty-eight years was practically the sole teacher of law in the university of Aberdeen first, as holding this lectureship; next, after the union of King's and Marischal Colleges (1860–81), as 'substitute' for Professor Patrick Davidson, who held the chair of law at King's College, but never lectured. After Davidson's death in 1881, Grub became professor of law in the University of Aberdeen. In 1856, he graduated A.M. at Aberdeen, and in 1864 he received the degree of LL.D. from his university, and on resigning the chair in 1891 he was presented by his former students and fellow-citizens with his portrait painted by Sir George Reid.

By birth an inheritor of the Scottish non-juring tradition, he was himself an accomplished theologian. He had followed with enthusiasm the whole course of the Oxford Movement; and in the congregation to which he belonged (St John's Episcopal Church, Aberdeen) he had supported his clergyman, Patrick Cheyne, throughout a prosecution in regard to eucharistic doctrine, which had weighty consequences, for it led to the charge and prosecution of the bishop of Brechin, Alexander Penrose Forbes, and the intervention of Pusey and Keble in defence of that prelate. It took some time to heal the sores occasioned by that controversy.

There was at Aberdeen in the early 1830s a group of young men, all of them Aberdeen lawyers, all of them episcopalians, and all of them earnest students of history and antiquities John Hill Burton, Joseph Robertson (1810-1866), and John Stuart (1813-1877). With these Grub associated on equal terms. Like them he contributed to the Aberdeen Magazine (1831-2), and took part in a far more important undertaking, the formation of the Spalding Club. For this club he edited (1840-2), in conjunction with Joseph Robertson, James Gordon's History of Scots Affairs, 3 vols. (1853), Thomas Innes's History of Scotland, Civil and Ecclesiastical (the Life of Thomas Innes which he contributed to this volume was reprinted in the edition of Innes's Critical Essays, published in the Historians of Scotland series), and (1869) the index volume of the Illustrations of the Antiquities of Aberdeen and Banff.

In 1861, his own work, by which he is best known, An Ecclesiastical History of Scotland from the Introduction of Christianity to the Present Time (it closes with the death of Bishop Skinner on 15 April 1857), in four volumes, was published at Edinburgh, and at once stamped him as the foremost authority on the subject in Scotland.

Clear and unaffected in style, this work is learned and exact, but it suffers somewhat from the fact that his extreme scrupulosity as to literal truth caused him to hold too severely in check the wit and liveliness which were so conspicuous and charming in his conversation. As an historian he was determined to be fair, albeit he is at no pains to conceal (what he was proud of) his enthusiastic toryism and his profound attachment to the Scottish Episcopal Church. In the preface, Grub acknowledges the help he had received from Joseph Robertson and Norval Clyne; he regrets that for the history of the Roman Catholic church after the Reformation he had not been able to obtain more accurate materials; and he says that the work had occupied him more than nine years. In spite of the more recent researches on the Celtic period of Scottish history, the book is by no means out of date; but it is unfortunate that no second edition of it was called for until Grub was too old to undertake the labour of preparing one. He had made notes for this which it is understood were lent to the Rev. W. Stephen, D.D., Dumbarton, for his History.

Grub contributed to Chambers's Encyclopædia the articles Scotland and Church of Scotland; that on Scottish Literature in the earlier editions was also his, but failing health prevented him from undertaking its revision for the new edition.

To the Aberdeen Philosophical Society, he contributed the Life of Bishop Elphinstone; The Life of Bishop Burnet, and his Character as a Historian and Biographer; Dr. James Beattie and his Friends; The Antiquities of Dunkeld; Froude's History and Mary, Queen of Scots; Elgin Cathedral; Review of the Evidence as to the Complicity of Queen Mary in the Murder of Darnley; and, in concert with his lifelong friend and companion, Norval Clyne, The Ecclesiastical and Baronial Antiquities of the Cathedral of Brechin and Castle of Edzell. An unpublished paper on Henry Scougal supplied materials for the Life of that author prefixed to the latest edition of Scougal's devotional treatise, The Life of God in the Soul of Man (Aberdeen, 1892).

== Family ==
His wife, Ann Lyall, died many years before him, leaving him two sons, the Rev. George Grub, provost of St Ninian's Cathedral, Perth, and the Rev. Charles Grub, rector of St Mary's, Montrose.

== Works ==
His Ecclesiastical History of Scotland (1861), written from the standpoint of an Episcopalian, is dry, but concise, clear, fair-minded, and trustworthy. Grub also edited (along with Joseph Robertson) Gordon's Scots Affairs for the Spalding Club, of which he was one of the founders.
