= Sybil Lewis =

Sybil Lewis may refer to:

- Sybil Lewis (surgeon)
- Sybil Lewis (actress)
