= Michael Hare Duke =

Anglican bishop and author

The Right Reverend Michael Hare Duke TSSF
- Bishop of St Andrews, Dunkeld and Dunblane
- Church: Scottish Episcopal Church
- Diocese: St Andrews, Dunkeld and Dunblane
- In office: 1969–1994
- Predecessor: John Howe
- Successor: Michael Henley

Orders
- Ordination: 1953
- Consecration: 1969

Personal details
- Born: 28 November 1924 Calcutta, India
- Died: 15 December 2014 (aged 90) Perth, Scotland
- Denomination: Anglican
- Spouse: Grace Lydia Frances Dodd
- Children: 4
- Education: Trinity College, Oxford

Michael Geoffrey Hare Duke (28 November 1924 – 15 December 2014) was an Anglican bishop and author: a former Bishop of St Andrews, Dunkeld and Dunblane.

== Early life ==
Born 28 November 1924, he was educated at Bradfield College and Trinity College, Oxford.

He was a Sub-Lieutenant in the RNVR from 1944 to 1946.

== Ordained ministry ==
Hare Duke was ordained deacon in 1952 and priest a year later. He began his ecclesiastical career as a curate at St John's Wood after which he was Vicar of St John with St Mark, Bury. He was Pastoral Director for the Clinical Theology Association after which he was Vicar of St Paul's, Daybrook.

He was elevated to the episcopate in 1969 as the 9th Bishop of St Andrews, Dunkeld and Dunblane. He retired in 1994.

He was a member of the Third Order of the Society of Saint Francis (TSSF), having made his profession in 1950.

== Notes ==
Anglican Communion titles
| Preceded by John William Alexander Howe | Bishop of St Andrews, Dunkeld and Dunblane; 1969– 1994 | Succeeded by Michael Harry George Henley |
