= George Grub (priest) =

Scottish priest

George Grub was a Scottish Episcopal Church priest in the early 20th century.

He was the son of George Grub (1812–1892) law professor and church historian, and his wife Ann née Lyall. Grub was educated at Aberdeen University and ordained in 1871. He was a curate at St Paul's, Dundee and then held incumbencies at St James's, Stonehaven and Holy Trinity, Ayr before his appointment as provost at St Ninian's Cathedral in Perth. He died on 5 October 1924

Anglican Communion titles
Preceded by Archibald Ean Campbell	Provost of St Ninian’s Cathedral, Perth; 1904 – 1908	Succeeded by Charles Edward Plumb
