= Archbishop of St Andrews (disambiguation) =

The title of Archbishop of St. Andrews has existed in a number of churches in Scotland:

- the Archbishop of St Andrews, senior churchman in Scotland before the Reformation (for those Bishops, with a full list, see also Bishop of St. Andrews)
- the Archbishop of St Andrews, bishopric of the Episcopalian Church of Scotland at times during the 17th century, now superseded by the Bishopric of Saint Andrews, Dunkeld and Dunblane.
- Archbishop of Saint Andrews and Edinburgh, refounded Roman Catholic Archdiocese - in 2006 held by Cardinal Keith O'Brien.
