= Peter Monie =

British administrator in India who later became a clergyman

Peter William Monie CSI (30 March 1877 – 11 December 1946) was a British administrator in India who later became a clergyman and was first honorary general secretary of Toc H, from 1925 to 1935.

Monie was born in Rothesay, Bute, Scotland. He was educated at Irvine Royal Academy, the University of Glasgow, and Balliol College, Oxford. He joined the Indian Civil Service in 1900 and was posted to Bombay Presidency as an Assistant Collector and Assistant Judge. In 1905, he was appointed Under-Secretary to the Government of Bombay and to the Home Department of the Government of India in 1907. From 1913, he served as Acting Collector of Nawabshah District, Sind, and in 1915 he was appointed Secretary to the Government of Bombay. He became Municipal Commissioner for the City of Bombay in 1916, Deputy Director of Development for Bombay in 1920, and retired in 1925.

Having been ordained into the Scottish Episcopal Church, he served as an assistant curate at St Mary's Cathedral, Glasgow from 1936 and was later appointed rector of Old St Paul's Church in Edinburgh, a post he held until his death.

Monie was appointed Companion of the Order of the Star of India (CSI) in the 1920 New Year Honours.
