= George Wilkinson (bishop) =

Scottish bishop (1833–1907)

The Most Reverend George Wilkinson
- Bishop of St Andrews, Dunkeld and Dunblane; Primus of the Scottish Episcopal Church
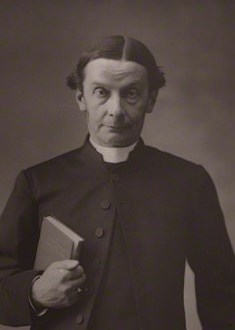
- Church: Scottish Episcopal Church
- Diocese: St Andrews, Dunkeld and Dunblane
- In office: 1893–1907 (Bishop of St Andrews, Dunkeld and Dunblane); 1904–1907 (Primus)
- Predecessor: Charles Wordsworth
- Successor: Charles Edward Plumb

Orders
- Ordination: 1858
- Consecration: 25 April 1883 by Edward White Benson

Personal details
- Born: 1 May 1833 Durham, England
- Died: 11 December 1907 (aged 74) Edinburgh, Scotland
- Buried: Brompton cemetery
- Denomination: Anglicanism
- Parents: George Wilkinson & Mary Howard
- Spouse: Caroline Charlotte
- Children: 8
- Education: Oriel College, Oxford

George Howard Wilkinson (1 May 1833 – 11 December 1907) was Bishop of Truro 1883–1891 and then of St Andrews, Dunkeld and Dunblane 1893–1907. He was Primus of the Scottish Episcopal Church from 1904, until his death.

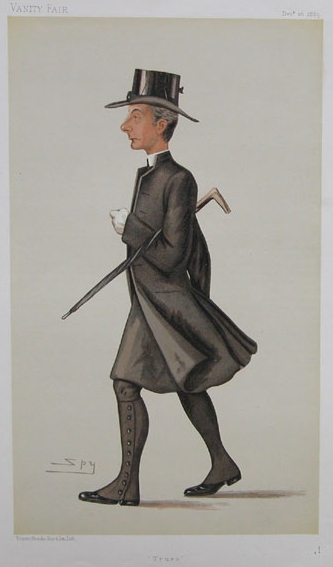
"Truro" Bishop Wilkinson as caricatured by Spy (Leslie Ward) in Vanity Fair, December 1885

== Life ==
Wilkinson was born on 1 May 1833 and educated at Durham School and Oriel College, Oxford. He embarked on an ecclesiastical career with a curacy at Kensington after which he held incumbencies at Seaham Harbour, Auckland, Soho and Eaton Square, a parish in a wealthy part of London, before elevation to the episcopate in 1883. He was consecrated at St Paul's Cathedral by the Archbishop of Canterbury on 25 April 1883 and resigned on 14 April 1891, due to ill health.

The founder of the Community of the Epiphany (1883), he died on 11 December 1907.

== Family ==
Wilkinson married, on 14 July 1857, Caroline Charlotte Des Vœux, daughter of lieutenant-colonel Benfield Des Vœux, fourth son of Sir Charles Des Vœux, 1st Baronet; she died on 6 September 1877. They had three sons and five daughters, including Reverend G. G. Wilkinson, and eldest daughter Constance Charlotte Mary Wilkinson, who married in 1902 Reverend Arthur Edward Davies, Chaplain to her father.

== Notes ==
Religious titles
Preceded by Edward White Benson	Bishop of Truro; 1883 –1891	Succeeded by John Gott
Preceded by Charles Wordsworth	Bishop of St Andrews, Dunkeld and Dunblane; 1893–1907	Succeeded by Charles Edward Plumb
Preceded by James Butler Knill Kelly	Primus of the Scottish Episcopal Church; 1904–1907	Succeeded by Walter John Forbes Robberds
