= Alison Watt (Scottish painter) =

Scottish painter (born 1965)

Alison Watt OBE FRSA RSA
- Born: 1965 (age 60–61); Greenock, Scotland
- Education: Glasgow School of Art
- Known for: Painting
- Awards: John Player Portrait Award (1987); OBE (2008)

Alison Watt OBE FRSE RSA (born 1965) is a British painter who first came to national attention while still at college when she won the 1987 Portrait Award at the National Portrait Gallery in London.

== Biography ==
Alison Watt. Self-portrait, 1986–87. Oil on canvas, 30.80 x 30.80 cm. Scottish National Portrait Gallery

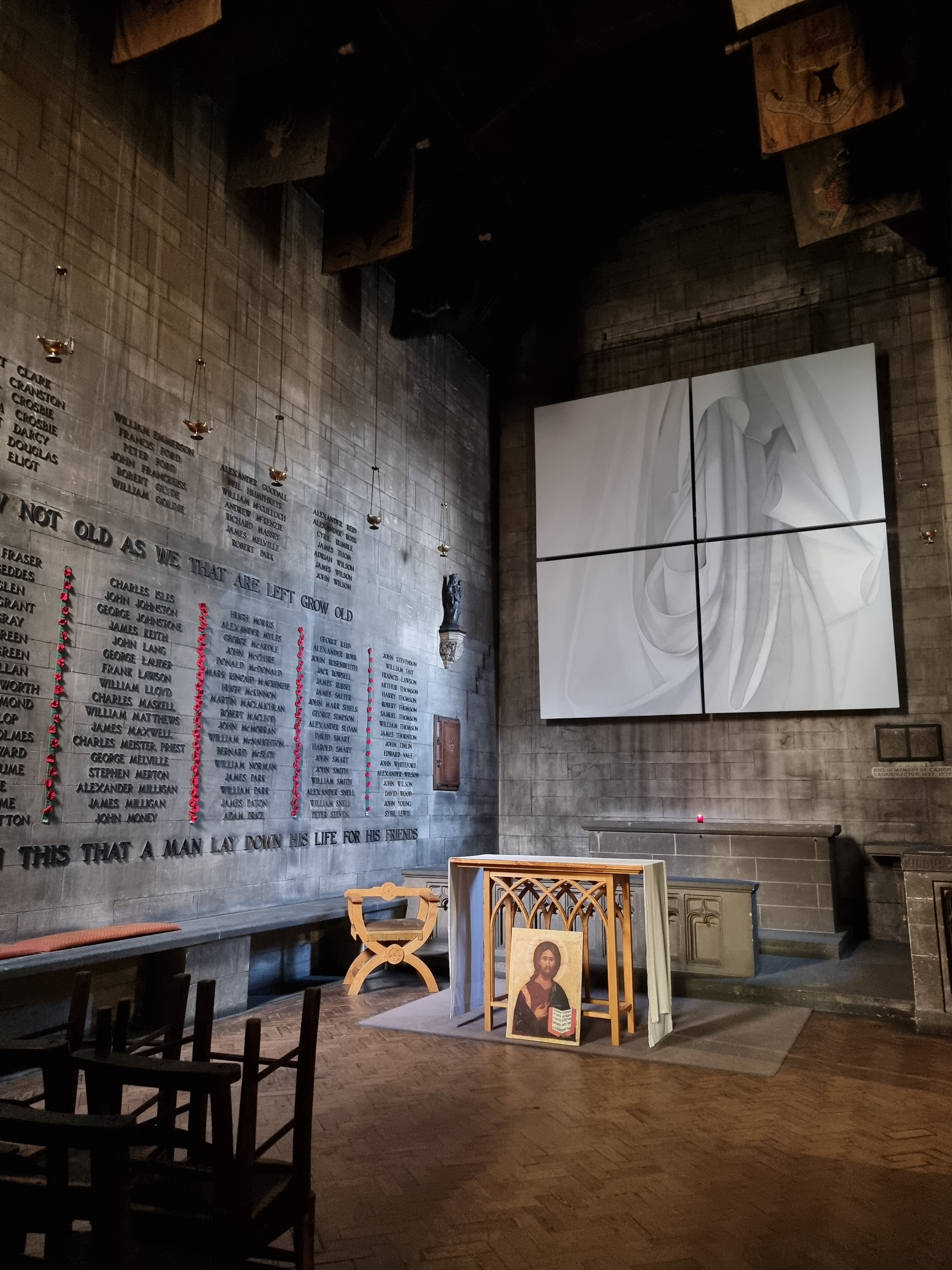
Still (2004) in the memorial chapel of Old St Paul's, Edinburgh

Watt was born in Greenock, Scotland. She studied at Glasgow School of Art, graduating in 1988. While a student, she came to national attention by winning the 1987 John Player Portrait Award and as a result was commissioned to paint a portrait of The Queen Mother.

Her first works to become well known were dryly painted figurative canvases, often female nudes, in light-filled interiors. An exhibition of her work entitled Fold in 1997 at Edinburgh's Fruitmarket Gallery was the first introducing fabric alongside these figures, simultaneously suggesting a debt to the 19th-century French painter Jean Auguste Dominique Ingres, as well as pointing to the possibilities of abstraction.

In 2000, Watt became the youngest artist to be offered a major solo exhibition at the Scottish National Gallery of Modern Art; her exhibition, titled Shift, comprised 12 huge paintings featuring fabric alone. In 2003, Watt was shortlisted for The Jerwood Painting Prize.

Watt exhibited during the 2004 Edinburgh Festival, installing a 12 feet (3.7 m) painting Still, in the memorial chapel of Old St Paul's Church. Linen bound books were published to commemorate each exhibition. For Still, Watt was awarded the 2005 Art+Christianity Enquiry, ACE award for 'a Commissioned Artwork in Ecclesiastical Space'.

Her subsequent project 'Dark Light' was supported by her Creative Scotland Award of 2004 from the Scottish Arts Council.

In summer 2005, she took part in the prestigious Glenfiddich residency.

From January 2006 to February 2008, Watt served as the seventh and youngest Associate Artist at the National Gallery, London. She worked within the gallery, and explored an enduring fascination with one particular painting in the collection, Zurbaran's St. Francis in Meditation (1635–39). The work she created in this time was displayed in a solo exhibition called 'Phantom', in the Sunley Room, running from 12 March to 22 June 2008. The same year, she was appointed Officer of the Order of the British Empire (OBE) in the 2008 New Year Honours.

Watt's work has been widely exhibited. Her paintings are held in many public collections, including the National Portrait Gallery, London, Glasgow Museums, Aberdeen Art Gallery, Scottish National Gallery of Modern Art, Kelvingrove Art Gallery and Museum, Scottish Parliament Art Collection, Southampton City Art Gallery, the Freud Museum, London, The Fleming Collection, London, the British Council, and the Uffizi Gallery, Florence. In 2012, the Scottish National Portrait Gallery purchased her painting Self-portrait (1986/7) from her private collection for £20,000, to celebrate re-opening after a refurbishment.

In 2017, Watt was made a Fellow of The Royal Society of Edinburgh.

Between July 2021 and January 2022, Watt exhibited at the Scottish National Portrait Gallery.

'A Portrait without Likeness' continued at the Inverness Museum and Art Gallery between January and April 2022.

Watt is currently represented by art gallery Levy Gorvy Dayan, New York and London.

== Work ==
Pears, 1994.oil on canvas, 152.5 by 180.5 cm. Private collection

Watt's 1986–87 Self-portrait was painted while still a student. She was ill at the time and she depicts herself with her hand across her forehead, as if checking her temperature or perhaps indicating she was feeling faint. Watt has rarely engaged in portraiture since her early career. The painting was presented to the Scottish National Portrait Gallery to celebrate its re-opening in 2011.

Pears dates from the 1990s when Watt's work focused on highly realistic nudes posed on drapery. The model used here is one she painted frequently at the time. Pears was offered for sale at a Sotheby's London auction on 18 November 2015.

Since then she has moved away from the nude to portraying the drapery itself.

=== Solo exhibitions ===
- 12 March – 22 June 2008 'Phantom', National Gallery, London, UK
- 17 March – 7 May 2016 'Alison Watt: The Sun Never Knew How Wonderful It Was' – Parafin Gallery, London, UK
- late 2018 'Alison Watt: A Shadow on the Blind' – Abbot Hall Art Gallery, Kendal, UK
- 24 May – 13 July 2019 'A Shadow on the Blind' – Parafin Gallery, London, UK
- 17 July – 9 January 2022 'A Portrait Without Likeness' – Scottish National Portrait Gallery, Edinburgh, UK.
- 5 March – 1 June 2025 'From Light' – Pitzhanger Manor & Gallery, London, UK.
