= Ian Paton (bishop) =

British Anglican bishop (born 1957)

The Right Reverend Ian James Paton
- Bishop of St Andrews, Dunkeld and Dunblane
- Church: Scottish Episcopal Church
- Diocese: St Andrews, Dunkeld and Dunblane
- Elected: 2 June 2018
- In office: 2018–present
- Predecessor: David Chillingworth

Orders
- Ordination: 1982 (deacon); 1983 (priest)
- Consecration: 20 October 2018 by Mark Strange

Personal details
- Born: 1957 (age 68–69) Liverpool, England
- Denomination: Anglican
- Spouse: Carrie
- Children: 1

Ian James Paton (born 1957) is a British Anglican bishop. Since 2018, he has been the Bishop of St Andrews, Dunkeld and Dunblane in the Scottish Episcopal Church.

== Early life and education ==
Ian Paton was born in 1957 in Liverpool, England. His father was born in Kingskettle in Fife and grew up in the Craigie, Perth. As a child, Paton had little interest in faith, and joined a choir at an Anglican church in Liverpool to avoid Sunday School. He studied history at Jesus College, Cambridge, graduating with a Bachelor of Arts (BA) degree in 1978. He remained at the University of Cambridge to train as a teacher, completing a Postgraduate Certificate in Education (PGCE) in 1979. While at Cambridge, he felt an "overwhelming desire to become a priest". He then trained for ordination at Westcott House, Cambridge, a liberal Anglo-Catholic theological college.

== Ordained ministry ==
Paton was ordained in the Church of England as a deacon in 1982 and as a priest in 1983. He served his curacy at Christ Church, Reading in the Diocese of Oxford from 1982 to 1984. He was then domestic chaplain to Patrick Rodger, Bishop of Oxford. His last roles in the Church of England were as chaplain at Wadham College, Oxford and a curate at University Church of St Mary the Virgin, between 1986 and 1990.

In 1990, he Paton moved to the Scottish Episcopal Church, having been appointed was canon and vice-provost of St Mary's Cathedral, Edinburgh in the Diocese of Edinburgh. He was then Rector of St Anne's Church, Dunbar, East Lothian, from 1994 to 1997, before becoming Rector of Old Saint Paul's, Edinburgh. He was an associate tutor at the Scottish Episcopal Institute from 1994 to 2014. He was made an honorary canon of St Mary's Cathedral, Edinburgh in 2004 and an honorary Anglican chaplain to Edinburgh University from 2013.

In June 2018, it was announced that he had been elected Bishop of St Andrews, Dunkeld and Dunblane. He was consecrated and installed as bishop during a service at St Ninian's Cathedral, Perth on 20 October 2018. He is the lead bishop for environmental affairs within the SEC. He supports the ordination of women and the rights of LGBTQ people.

He will retire from full-time ministry on 1 November 2026.

== Personal life ==
Paton is married to Carrie Applegath, a fellow Anglican priest and a psychotherapist. Together they have one son.
