= Jonathan Burton =

Jonathan Burton may refer to:

- Jonathan Burton (passenger), on Southwest Airlines Flight 1763
- General Jonathan Burton, namesake of Burton, New Hampshire
- Jonathan Burton, musician on Malaco Records

== See also ==
- Jon Burton, video game designer
- John Burton (disambiguation)
