= Albert Ernest Laurie =

Scottish Episcopalian priest and war hero

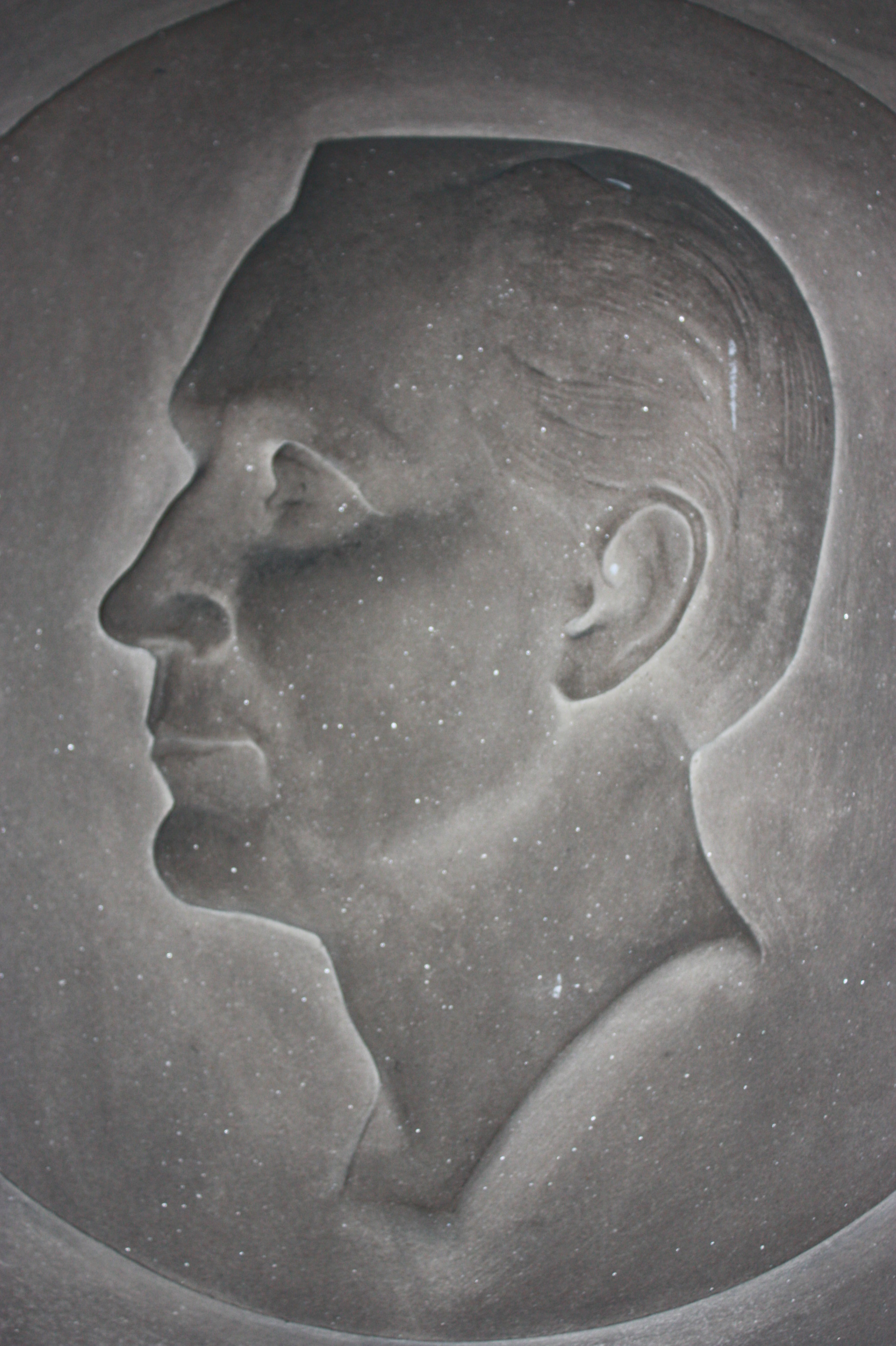
Memorial plaque to Albert Ernest Laurie in Old St Paul's, Edinburgh

Albert Ernest Laurie (25 June 1866 – 25 April 1937) was a Scottish Episcopalian priest and military hero of the First World War.

== Life ==
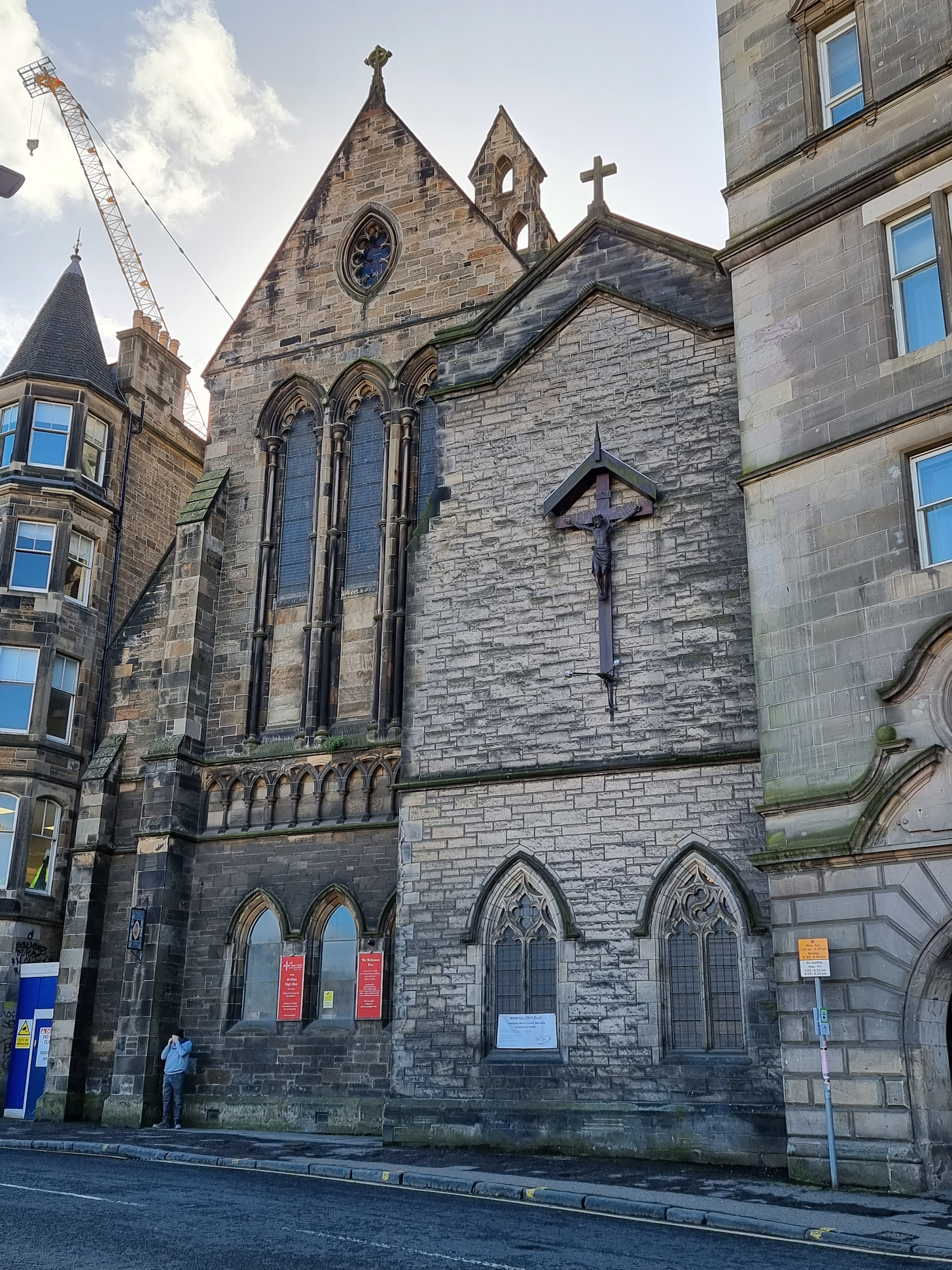
Old St Paul's Church on Jeffrey Street in Edinburgh; the war memorial chapel is on the right

Laurie was born on 25 June 1866 at 13 Union Street the son of John Laurie, an Edinburgh accountant, and his wife, Janet Elizabeth Cullingworth. He was educated at Bonnington Academy, a small private school (now 174 Newhaven Road). In 1885 he attended the University of Edinburgh to study divinity. He entered the Theological College as a postgraduate in 1887 and studied until 1890. He was appointed curate of Old St Paul's Church on Jeffrey Street in 1891 and remained there for the majority of his working life, becoming rector in 1897. For most of his life he lived in Lauder House on Jeffrey Street, the rectory connected to Old St Paul's. The house was designed by James Lessels in 1886. Laurie was raised to Canon in 1917 and appointed Chancellor of the Diocese of Edinburgh in 1925. Old St Paul's was the centre of the Anglo-Catholic movement in Scotland.

In 1906 he organised (through the Town Council) the creation of the Child Garden nearby in the centre of Chessels Court, just off the Royal Mile.

In the First World War he served as an army chaplain in France. He won his first Military Cross in 1916 and a second in 1917, each for tending the wounded on an active battlefield, at risk of his own life. On his return to the church, he created the Warriors' Chapel in Old St Paul's, which is described as "one of the most beautiful war memorials in Scotland". His church assistant, Charles Gustave Meister (b.1882), also joined up and won the Military Cross, but was killed in April 1918.

Laurie was elected a fellow of the Royal Society of Edinburgh in 1921. His proposers were Alfred Archibald Boon, Sir John Halliday Croom, James Robert Milne James Haig Ferguson and Arthur Pillans Laurie. The University of Edinburgh awarded him a doctorate (DD) in 1923.

He died suddenly on 25 April 1937. He did not marry and had no children.
