= Anthony MacGregor Grier =

British colonial administrator, civil servant and soldier

Anthony MacGregor Grier, CMG (12 April 1911 – 22 December 1989) was a British colonial administrator, civil servant and soldier who was general manager of the Redditch Development Corporation (1964–76).

== Life ==
Anthony MacGregor Grier was born on 12 April 1911 to the Very Rev. Alexander Roy MacGregor Grier. He attended St Edward's School in Oxford, and Exeter College, Oxford, and served in the West African Frontier Force and the Sierra Leone Regiment before entering the Colonial Administrative Service in Sierra Leone in 1935. After serving with the Colonial Office in London and Delhi between 1943 and 1947, he was stationed in North Borneo as a district officer until 1964, and was appointed a Companion of the Order of St Michael and St George in 1963. He returned to the United Kingdom in 1964 to be general manager of the Redditch Development Corporation, serving until 1976; the year after he left that post, he was elected to Hereford and Worcester County Council for the Conservatives. He left public office in 1985 and died on 22 December 1989, leaving a widow (Patricia, daughter of Lord Spens) and three children.

During his time in Redditch, he managed its development into a New Town accommodating over 100,000 people, mostly "overspill" from Birmingham. His time in the town was controversial, with The Times reporting that some locals accused Grier of being an "old colonial" who regarded inhabitants as "the natives"; however, he considered his work there as one of his greatest achievements and stayed in the area when he retired.
