= Vincent Rorison =

Scottish priest

Vincent Lewis Rorison (1851–27 August 1910) was an Anglican priest in the late 19th and early 20th centuries.

== Life ==
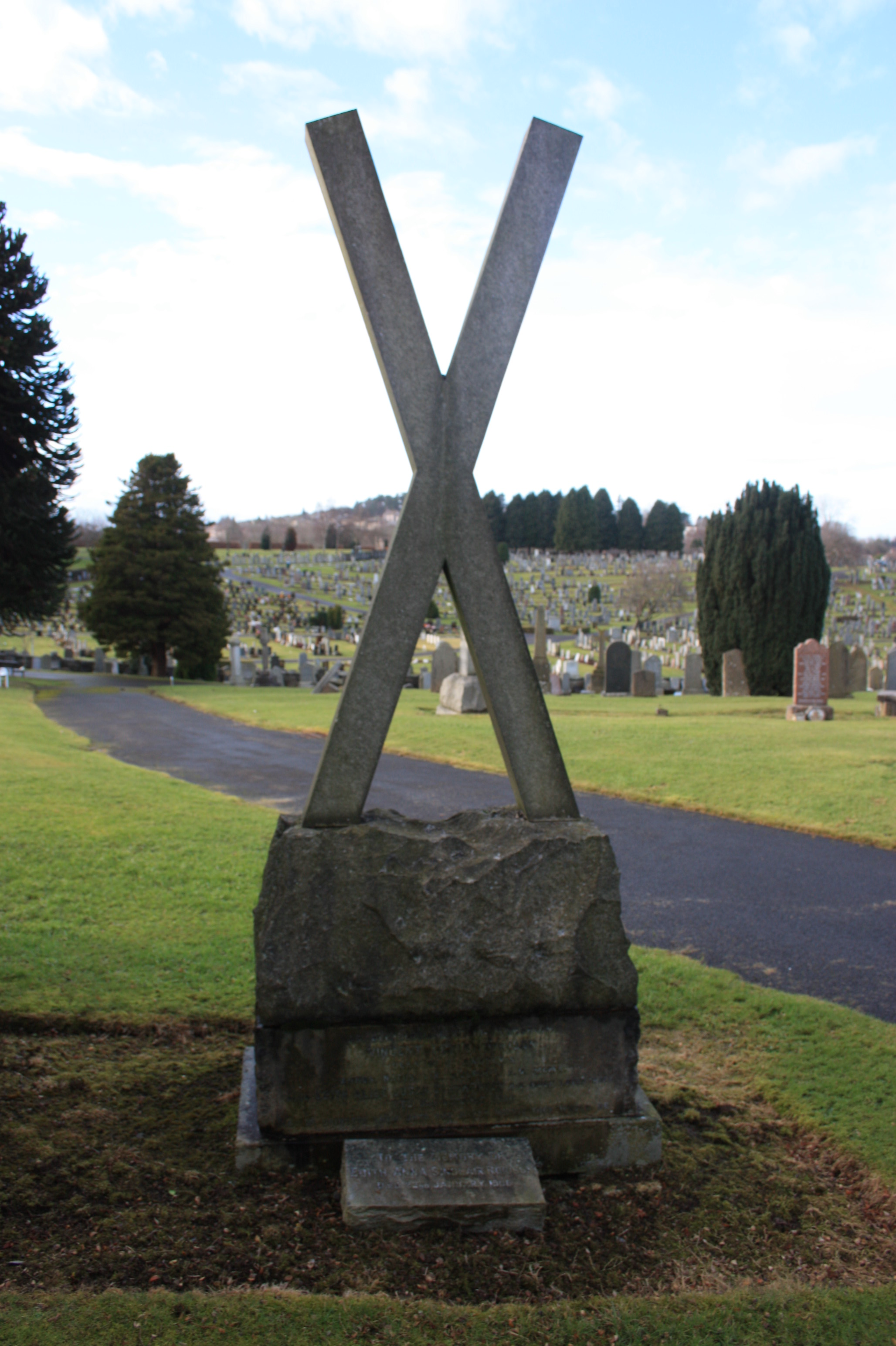
The grave of Vincent Rorison, Wellshill Cemetery, Perth

He was born in 1851 and educated at Trinity College, Glenalmond.

He then studied divinity at the University of Aberdeen. Ordained in 1874, he was Chaplain to the Bishop of Aberdeen after which he was Rector of St John's Forfar before being appointed Provost of St Ninian's Cathedral, Perth in 1885, a post he held for 16 years. His final appointment was as Dean of St Andrews, Dunkeld and Dunblane.

He died on 27 August 1910.

== Family ==
He was buried with his wife, Edith Alice Susan Stephenson (died 1924) in Wellshill Cemetery in northern Perth. Their daughter Edith Anna Sinclair Rorison lies with them. The very distinctive grave, with an open St Andrews Cross, stands near the summit of the cemetery. Another daughter Emma Rose Grey Rorison died aged only 13 years old in 1902.

He was the father of Canon Harry Rorison.

Religious titles
Preceded by John Burton	Provost of St Ninian’s Cathedral, Perth; 1885 –1901	Succeeded by Archibald Ean Campbell
Preceded by Norman Johnson	Dean of St Andrews, Dunkeld and Dunblane; 1901 –1910	Succeeded by George Taylor Shillito Farquhar
