= John Burton (canoeist) =

American retired slalom canoeist

John Gamble Burton (born May 25, 1947 in Evanston, Illinois) is an American retired slalom canoeist who competed from the late 1960s to the early 1970s. He finished 12th in the C-2 event at the 1972 Summer Olympics in Munich.
