= Lumsden Barkway =

The Right Reverend Lumsden Barkway
- Bishop of St Andrews, Dunkeld and Dunblane
- Church: Scottish Episcopal Church
- Diocese: St Andrews, Dunkeld and Dunblane
- In office: 1939–1949
- Predecessor: Edward Reid
- Successor: Brian Burrowes
- Previous post: Bishop of Bradford (1935–1938)

Orders
- Consecration: 1935

Personal details
- Born: 9 July 1878
- Died: 12 December 1968 (aged 90)
- Denomination: Anglican

James Lumsden Barkway (9 July 1878 – 12 December 1968) was a bishop in the 20th century.

== Biography ==
He was born on 9 July 1878 and educated at Liverpool University and Westminster College, Cambridge. After ten years as a Presbyterian minister his first Anglican ministry position was as a minor canon at St Albans Cathedral from where he moved to be vicar of Christ Church, Luton. He was made deacon on Trinity Sunday 1916 (18 June) and ordained priest the following Trinity Sunday (3 June 1917) — both times by Edgar Jacob, Bishop of St Albans, at the cathedral. Following time as Rector of Little Gaddesden, he was appointed the Bishop of Bedford in 1935. He was consecrated a bishop by Cosmo Lang, Archbishop of Canterbury, at St Paul's Cathedral on Whit Tuesday 1935 (11 June).

Barkway wrote a popular apologetic presentation of the Niceno-Constantinopolitan Creed, The Creed and its Credentials.

Three years later he was translated to be the Bishop of St Andrews, Dunkeld and Dunblane where he stayed for eleven years. He resigned his See in May 1949.

He retired to Kingscote, Gloucestershire, where he undertook some bishop's duties; he died at home in Coulsdon, Greater London, on 12 December 1968, aged 90.

Anglican Communion titles
Vacant Title last held by Robert Billing	Bishop of Bedford; 1935–1938	Succeeded by Alymer Skelton
Preceded by Edward Reid	Bishop of St Andrews, Dunkeld and Dunblane; 1938–1949	Succeeded by Brian Burrowes
