= John Bloundelle-Burton =

English novelist (1850–1917)

- Born: John Edward Bloundelle-Burton; Southampton, Hampshire, England
- Died: December 11, 1917 (aged 67); London, England
- Occupations: Novelist, journalist
- Years active: 1885 – 1917
- Known for: ~60 adventure and historical-romance novels, often maritime or “sea/adventure” themes
- Notable work: The Silent Shore (1886), Desert Ship (1890), A Bitter Heritage (1899), A Woman from the Sea (1907)

John Edward Bloundelle-Burton (c. 1850–11 December 1917) was an English novelist. Having worked as a journalist for The London Standard, he began writing novels in 1885, publishing 60 works in total.

== Selected works ==
- The Silent Shore (1886)
- Desert Ship (1890)
- Denounced (1896)
- A Bitter Heritage (1899)
- A Branded Name (1903)
- A Woman from the Sea (1907)
- Last of her Race (1908)
- Under the Salamander (1911)
- The Sea Devils (1912)
- Love Lies Bleeding (1914)
