= Sybil Lewis (surgeon) =

Early Scottish female surgeon

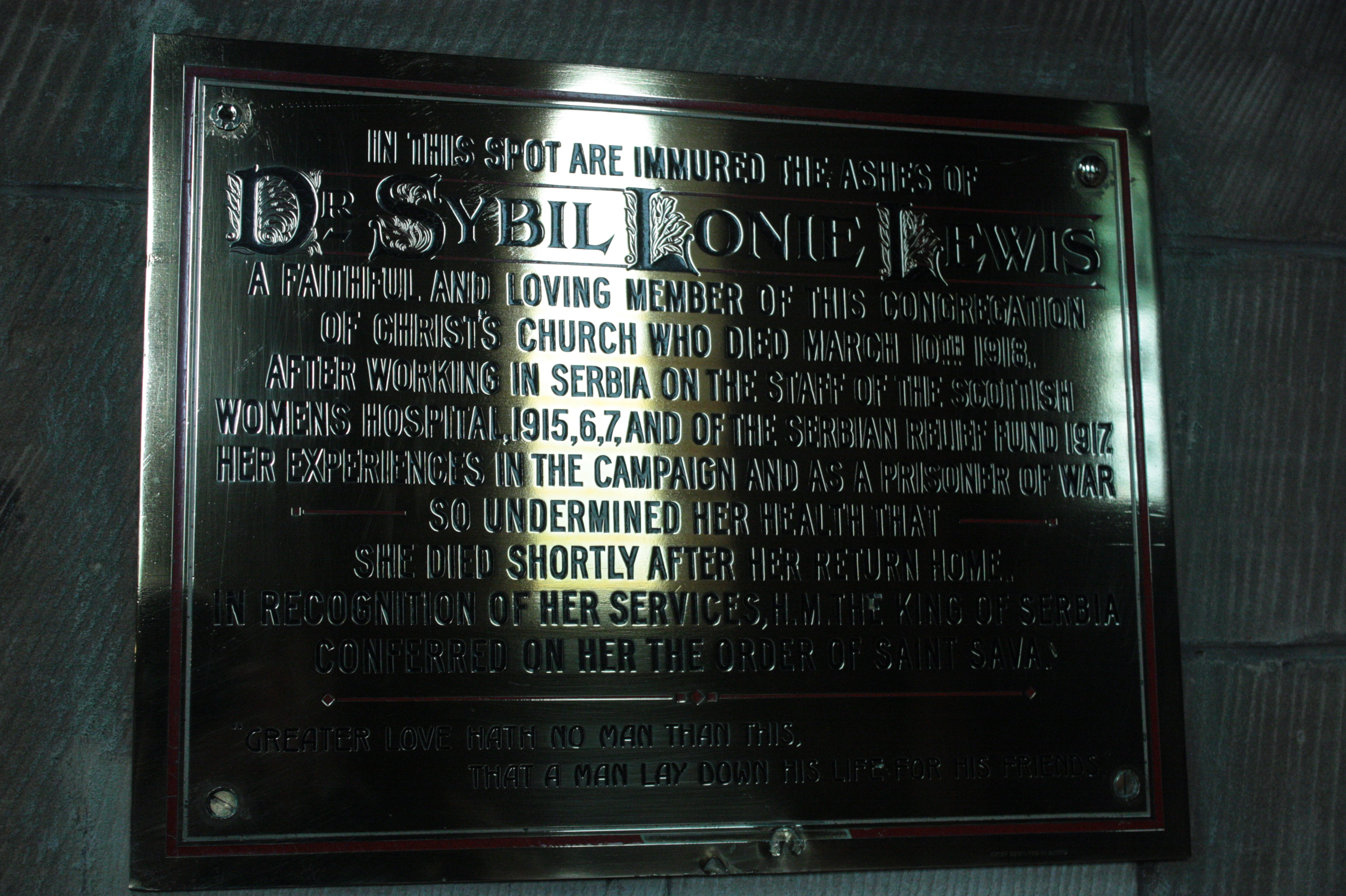
Plaque to Dr Sybil Lewis at Old St Paul's, Edinburgh

Sybil Lonie Lewis, OSS (1874 – 10 March 1918) was an early Scottish female surgeon who served with distinction in Serbia during the First World War. In 1917 she helped to establish the Serbian Relief Fund.

== Life ==
She was born in 1874, probably in Kingston-upon-Hull.

She originally trained in nursing and midwifery. She then trained as a doctor, studying first at the college created by Dr Elsie Inglis in 1887 as a route into studies at the University of Edinburgh, which at that time did not admit female students. She completed her studies at Trinity College Dublin and received her diplomas to practice in 1905. She served her medical residency in Larbert Mental Asylum in central Scotland. She then returned to Hull as Medical Officer to both the Diocesan Maternity Hospital and the Sheltering Home for Girls.

In June 1915 she joined a group of female doctors led by Dr Elsie Inglis in Serbia, generally known as the Scottish Women's Hospitals for Foreign Service. Her hospital was overrun by the enemy in late 1915 and she spent 4 months as a prisoner-of-war in Hungary, being released back to Britain in February 1916. Her unpublished diaries can be read online, as part of the Oxford University 'Lest we forget' project.

Although somewhat weakened by the experience, and now in poor health, she returned to the front in August 1916, serving the Serbian army and civilian casualties in Macedonia. She returned to Britain in December 1917 due to a family illness.

She became gravely ill on 7 March from “an illness contracted in Serbia” and died three days later at her family home in Hull on 10 March 1918 aged 43. Her body was cremated and her ashes are buried in Old St Paul's Episcopal Church in central Edinburgh, marked by a brass plaque near the south-west corner. Categorised as “war dead” hers is the only female name on the war memorial in Old St Paul's.

The Serbian Empire awarded her the Order of Saint Sava for her services to their country.
