= John Burton (Kent cricketer) =

English cricketer

Personal information
- Born: 7 May 1837; Faversham, Kent
- Died: 19 February 1887 (aged 49); Sittingbourne, Kent
- Source: Cricinfo, 9 March 2017

John Burton (7 May 1837 – 19 February 1887) was an English cricketer. He played twelve first-class matches for Kent between 1862 and 1864.

== Bibliography ==
- Carlaw, Derek (2020). Kent County Cricketers, A to Z: Part One (1806–1914) (PDF). Cardiff: ACS.
