= Edward Fortescue =

English Anglican priest who converted to Catholicism

Edward Bowles Knottesford-Fortescue (Note: Fortescue may have used each surname separately at different points in his life.) (1816–1877) was an English Anglican priest who converted to Catholicism.

== Life ==
Edward Fortescue was born in 1816 in Stoke-by-Nayland in Suffolk, the son of Francis Fortescue and his wife Maria, only daughter of the Revd George Downing, rector of Ovington and prebendary of Ely Cathedral. Francis Fortescue inherited the estate of Bridgeton with the manors of Alveston and Teddington from his father's cousin, John Knottesford, who was also godfather to Francis. Upon coming of age, Francis added the name Knottesford, which was a condition of the will. Francis and Maria had two sons, George and Edward.

Fortescue's father was ordained in the Church of England. In 1823 the family moved to the family estate at Alveston on the outskirt of Stratford-on-Avon, where Francis Fortescue became rector of the parish of Billesley. Fortescue was educated at home before entering Wadham College, Oxford, on 5 June 1834 at the age of 18. He acquired a B.A. in 1838, and an M.A. in 1842.

He was ordained in 1840. After a curacy in Billesley, he became the incumbent at Wilmcote. The Oxford Movement was a Catholic revival movement in the Church of England beginning in the early 19th century, centred in Oxford, and Wilmcote was the site they chose to build a church, a school and a retreat house. The early 19th-century village had no church and was then a part of the adjoining parish of Aston Cantlow but with a growing working class population due to the growth of the Wilmcote quarries, the village was much in need of a church and a school. The modern church of St Andrew, built in 1841, is a monument to the influence of the Oxford Movement in the parish. It was built by the Francis Fortescue-Knottesford and Edward, who became the first curate, to meet the semi-industrial conditions created by the opening of the cement works in the 1830s. The parishes were re-organized, and portions of the parishes of Aston Cantlow and Stratford-on-Avon became the consolidated chapelry of St Andrew, Wilmcote. Fortescue introduced the use of Eucharistic vestments while at Wilmcote. He was "highly regarded as a preacher and retreat master".

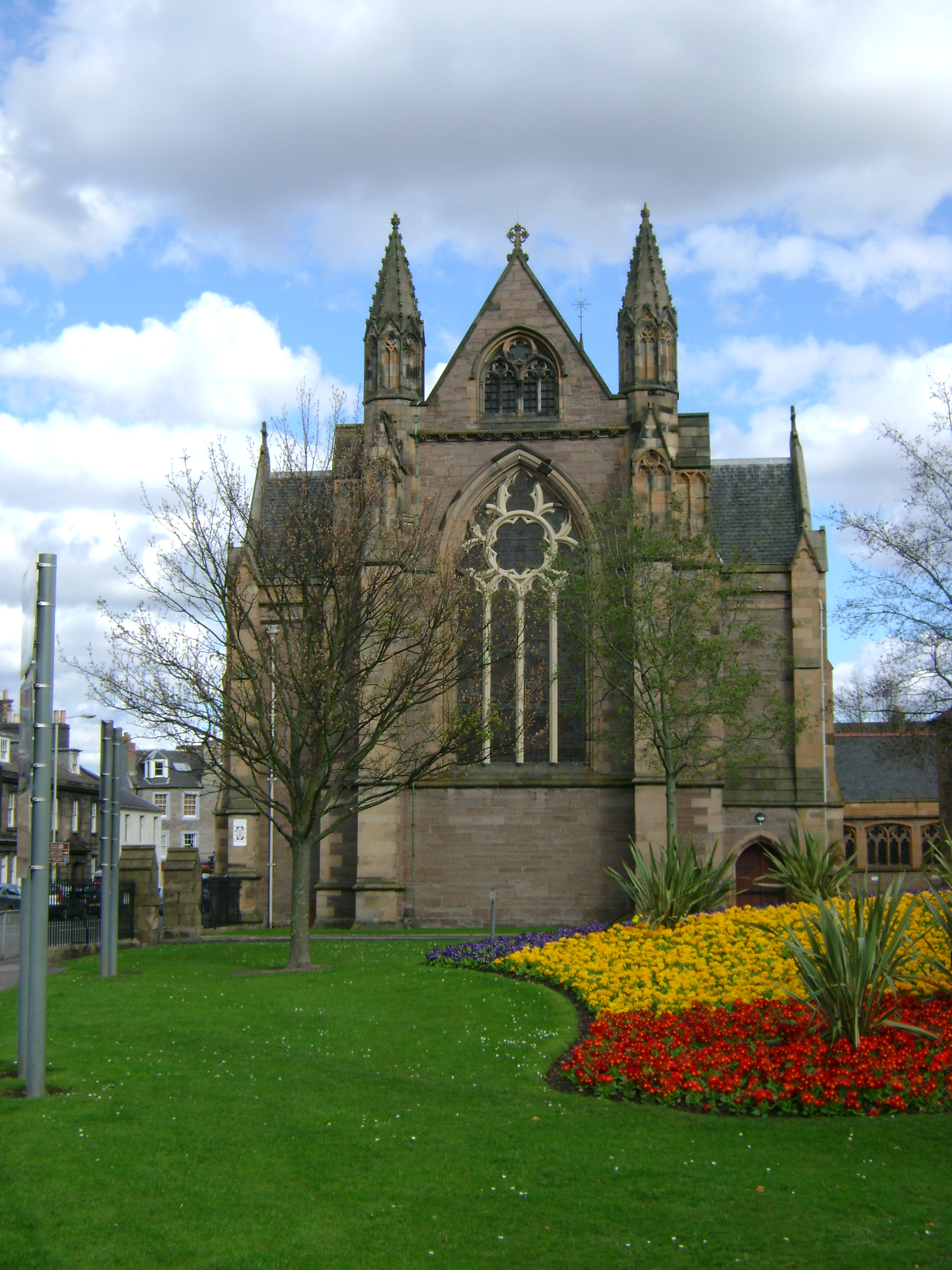
St Ninian's Cathedral, Perth (Scotland)

In 1851 he was appointed dean of St Ninian's, Perth and then provost when cathedral status was confirmed by Wordsworth in 1853; this after John Mason Neale had declined. Fortescue remained there for 20 years until he resigned in 1871. On 8 September 1857, he chaired the inaugural meeting of the Association for the Promotion of the Unity of Christendom. While at Perth, he became embroiled in the ritualist controversy.

John Wordsworth described Fortescue as:

In dress Provost Fortescue was carefully clerical, but in an old-fashioned style. although not much, if at all, below average height, he looked shorter from his habit of holding his head rather bent and forward. ...If he did not like his company, or did not feel sure of it, Provost Fortescue used to adopt a somewhat donnish, reserved, enigmatical manner and spoke little and (apparently) unwillingly. when at his ease, however, he could talk much and with great animation, and when it pleased him, in a select circle, freely to unbend, he was full of mirth, and could tell or enjoy a good story with the best. ...His theology was fundamentally that of the High Church School. ...In his public speaking he was generally content to set forth clearly and plainly, and in the very striking manner which he could employ, the orthodox aspect of doctrine and practice. But in private talk or conference his great delight seemed to be paradoxical as possible, ...A favorite way of his was to maintain the tenability of the most ultra-Roman opinions on all subjects. This reckless manner of argument, which was with him (at all events for many years) only a wayward jeu d'esprit, sometimes had unhappy consequences.

At the age of twenty-two, Fortescue had married Frances Anne Spooner, daughter of Archdeacon William Spooner, rector of Elmdon. Her sister was married to Archibald Campbell Tait, who, in 1868 became Archbishop of Canterbury. Frances died in 1868. In 1871 Fortescue married Gertrude Martha Robins, daughter of Sanderson Robins, another Anglican clergyman, and Caroline Gertrude Foster-Barham. In 1872, he and his wife were received into the Roman Catholic Church. He lived as a layman, acting as principal to a Catholic school in Holloway.

His fourth son, George Knottesford Fortescue (1847–1912), became keeper of printed books in the British Museum in 1899. His fifth son, Vincent was rector of Bubbenhall in Kenilworth from 1884 to 1906. Adrian Fortescue (1874–1923) was a Roman Catholic priest, liturgist, Byzantine scholar and adventurer.

Edward Fortescue died on 18 August 1877. He was buried at St Mary's Catholic Cemetery, Kensal Green.

== See also ==
- Ritualism in the Church of England
