= Jack Burton (cricketer) =

Australian cricketer

Personal information
- Full name: Jack Richard Burton
- Born: 3 November 1923; Cleve, South Australia
- Died: 30 October 2001 (aged 77); Adelaide, South Australia
- Batting: Right-handed
- Bowling: Right-arm fast-medium
- Role: Bowler

Domestic team information
- Years: Team
- 1951/52: South Australia

Career statistics
Competition	First-class
Matches	1
Runs scored	8
Batting average	4.00
100s/50s	0/0
Top score	8
Balls bowled	192
Wickets	1
Bowling average	118.00
5 wickets in innings	0
10 wickets in match	0
Best bowling	1/118
Catches/stumpings	0/–
- Source: Cricinfo, 18 May 2018

Jack Richard Burton (3 November 1923 – 30 October 2001) was an Australian cricketer. He played one first-class match for South Australia during the 1951–52 season.
