= Old St Paul's, Edinburgh =

Coordinates: 55°57′04.32″N 03°11′13.56″W

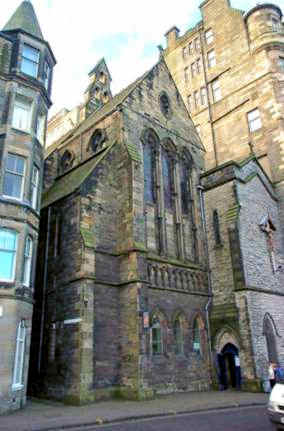
- Old St Paul's, Jeffrey Street, Edinburgh
- Old St Paul's, Edinburgh
- Denomination: Scottish Episcopal Church
- Churchmanship: Anglo-Catholic
- Website: http://www.osp.org.uk

History
- Dedication: Paul the Apostle

Administration
- Diocese: Diocese of Edinburgh

Clergy
- Rector: The Revd Canon John McLuckie

Old St Paul's is an historic church of the Scottish Episcopal Church in the heart of Edinburgh's Old Town in Scotland. It is one of the original, 17th-century, congregations of the Scottish Episcopal Church, part of the Anglican Communion, which evolved with the adoption of Presbyterian governance by the established Church of Scotland. Its congregation originally formed as a breakaway from the city's St Giles' Cathedral.

It has been known as Old St Paul's since the 19th century to distinguish it from the 'new' St Paul's at York Place, Edinburgh.

== History ==
Although the present building dates from the 19th century, Old St Paul's has a history going back 300 years to the beginning of the Scottish Episcopal Church.

The original congregation of Old St Paul's was a breakaway group from St Giles' Cathedral, which had become the Cathedral of Edinburgh in 1634. The last bishop at St Giles', Alexander Rose, left the Cathedral in 1689 accompanied by much of his congregation. He founded a new place of worship in an old wool store in Carrubber's Close, close to the present site of Old St Paul's.

Many Episcopalians remained pro-Jacobite during the Jacobite rising of 1689, loyal to James and his descendants. Members of St Paul's were involved in the Jacobite struggle, including the Risings of 1715 and 1745. One member of the congregation brought the news of Bonnie Prince Charlie's victory at Prestonpans to Edinburgh, shutting the town gates against the defeated Hanoverian army.

As a result of the Risings, Episcopalians and their places of worship were persecuted under law. It was only after the death of Charles Edward Stuart (Bonnie Prince Charlie) in 1788 that the association of Episcopalians with Jacobitism was shaken off. Penal laws were gradually repealed, and in that year the Scottish Synod resolved that George III would be prayed for in all Episcopal Churches.

During the 1820s, overcrowding at St Paul's led to the founding of a new church in Broughton Place. This congregation later moved to the Inverleith area, and St James, Goldenacre was opened there in 1888.

== Building ==
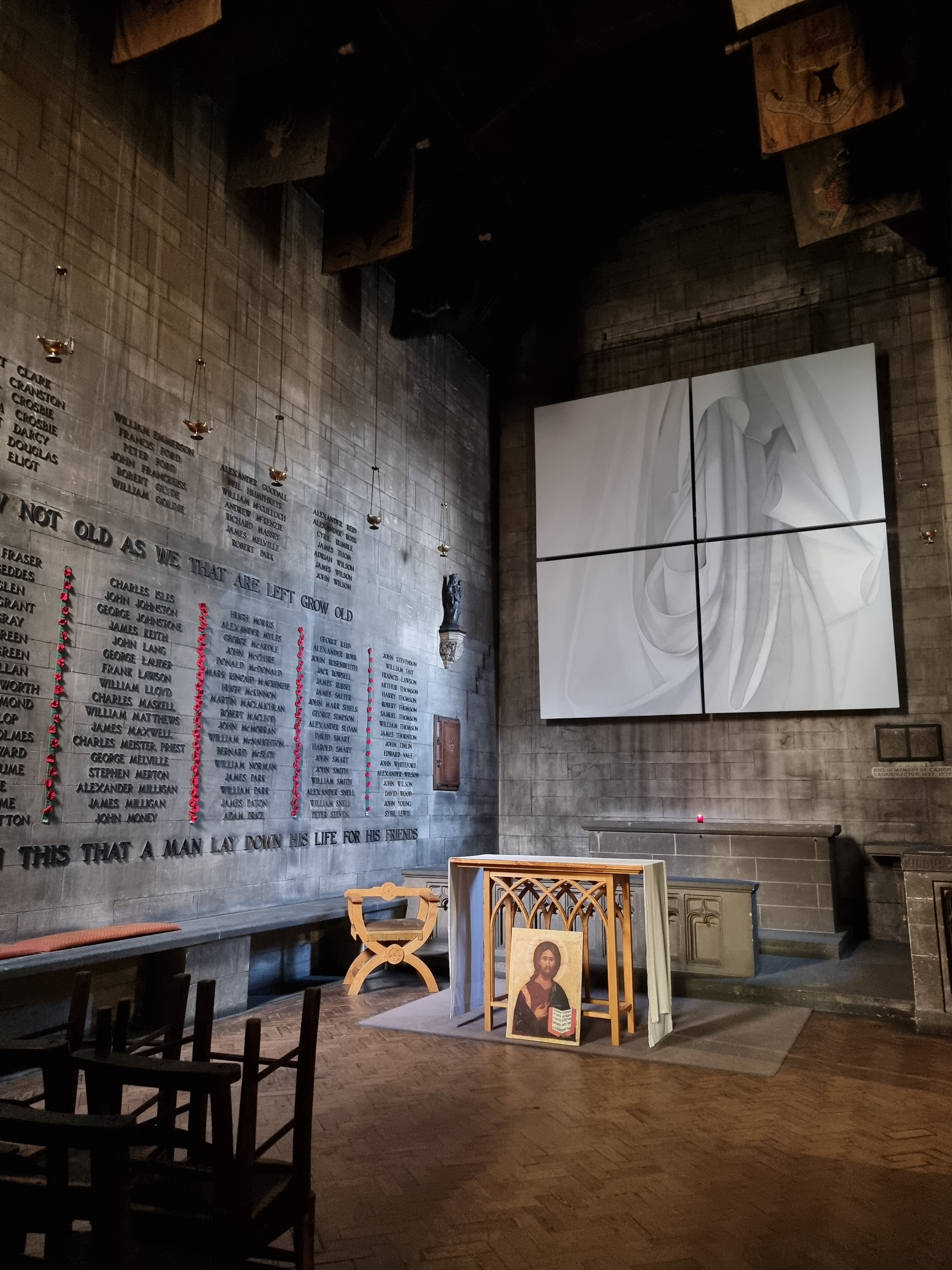
Alison Watt's Still (2004) in the memorial chapel

The present building was designed by William Hay and George Henderson in the Early English style at a cost of £3,500, and was completed in 1883. Hay had been a pupil of Sir Gilbert Scott (architect of St Mary's Episcopal Cathedral in the West End of Edinburgh). Two subsequent nave extensions have trebled the building's original length, and the chancel floor has been raised and laid with marble. It is a Category B listed building.

The high altar is made of carved oak in neo-Norman style with grape vine decoration, surmounted with a slab of porphyry. Seven lamps represent the gifts of the Holy Spirit. The reredos is in gilded oak, and was designed by Hay & Henderson in 1896. The lancet windows depict the crucifixion, with St Paul and St Columba on either side. The roof of the nave is a hammer beam structure with wooden gargoyles. The pulpit is made of carved oak, with figures of saints, and was built in 1892.

A memorial chapel (the Warriors Chapel) was built in 1926 as a memorial to the lives lost in the First World War, designed by Sir Matthew Ochterlony. This was organised by the then Rector, Canon Albert Ernest Laurie (1866–1937) who had served as an army chaplain in France; he twice won the Military Cross for tending the wounded on the battlefield. His church assistant, Charles Gustave Meister (b.1882), also won the Military Cross, but was killed in 1918. The chapel, which is described as "one of the most beautiful war memorials in Scotland", contains rolls of honour from both World Wars. The roll of the First World War includes one woman; Sybil Lewis. This chapel also contains the Martyrs' Cross, a small iron cross that originally hung in the Grassmarket opposite the gallows, and was the last object seen by condemned criminals before execution. The chapel ordinarily houses a painting Still by Scottish artist Alison Watt.

=== Sculpture ===
At the head of the Calvary Stair is a sculpture of the Crucifixion by Alfred Frank Hardiman, completed in 1926.

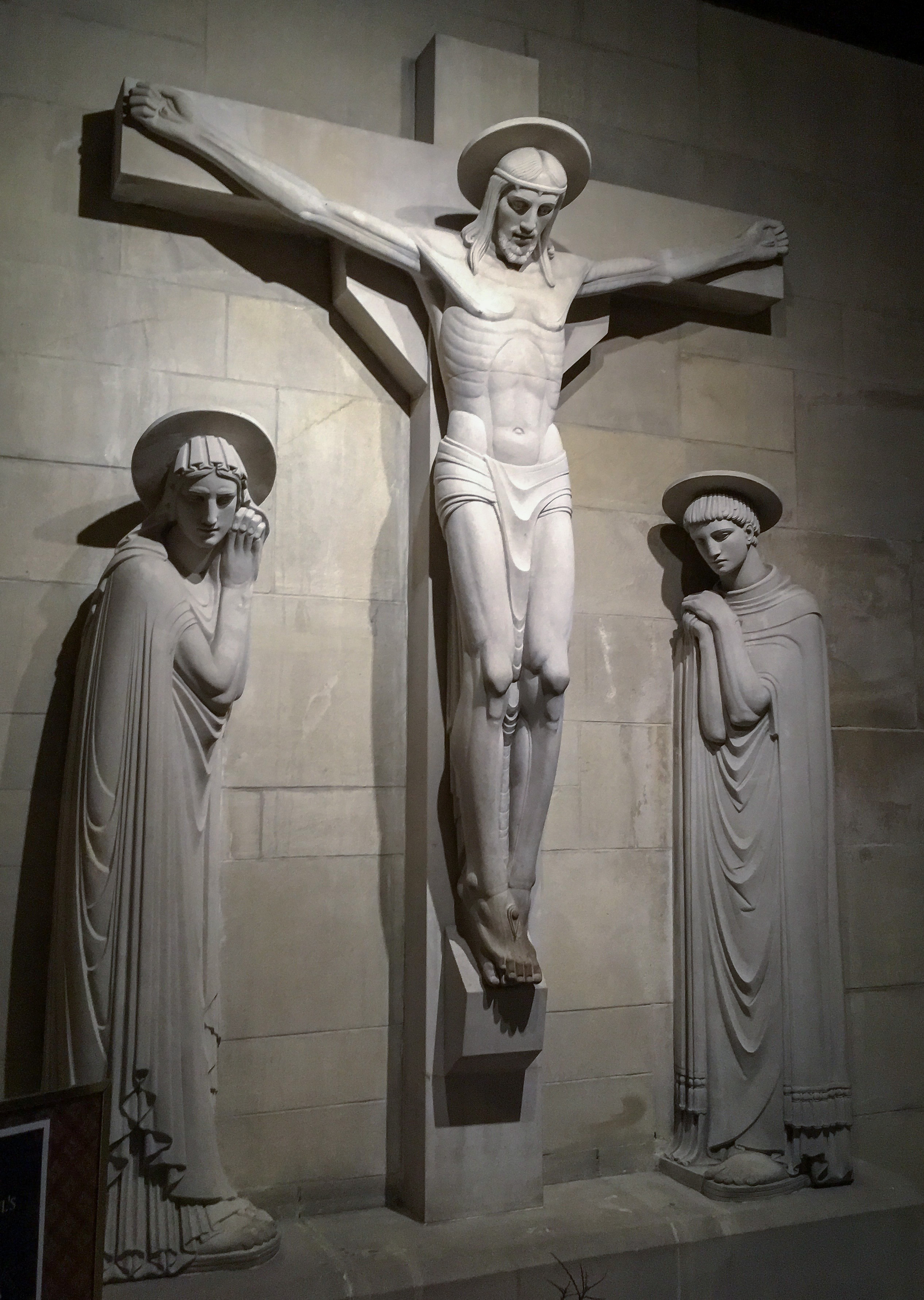
Alfred Hardiman, Calvary, 1926

=== Organ ===
The present organ was built by Father Henry Willis and installed in 1888. Slight modifications were made to this instrument in 1936; it was electrified and enlarged in 1960 when a new console with tab stops was provided. Further tonal modifications and additions were made in 1968.

=== Church Hall ===
Beneath the Church is a sizeable hall. During the Edinburgh Fringe, the hall is transformed into theSpace @ Venue 45 by venue operators theSpaceUK.

== Incumbents ==
Name	Comments	Date
Alexander Rose	Bishop of Edinburgh	1689
Andrew Cant	College bishop	1720
John Gillan	Later Bishop of Dunblane	1727
William Harper (Sr.)		1735
William Harper (Jr.)		1765
Charles Webster		1785
John Webster		1795
Simon Reid		1806
William Elstob		1814
Edward Craig		1818
Interregnum		1821
John Sinclair	Later Archdeacon of Middlesex	1822
Edward Ramsay		1826
William Henderson		1827
William Marriot		1828
David Drummond	Resigned in the "Drummondite Schism"	1832
Thomas Anderson		1838
John Alexander		1842
George West		1846
Edward Field		1847
Various clergy		1849
Charles Absolom		1851
James MacLachlan		1853
William Kennedy		1865
Henry Nicholson		1869
Robert Wadsworth		1872
W. Douglas		1875
Daniel Darnell		1876
William Meredith		1877
David Smart		1878
Reginald Mitchell-Innes		1884
Albert Ernest Laurie	Awarded the Military Cross twice in the First World War	1897
Peter Monie	Former British administrator in India	1937
Interregnum		1946
Douglas Lockhart		1947
Stuart Chancellor		1963
Richard Holloway	Later Bishop of Edinburgh and Primus	1968
Geoffrey Sowerby		1981
Alan Moses		1985
Paul Tarrant		1996
Ian Paton	Later Bishop of St Andrews, Dunkeld and Dunblane	1997
John McLuckie		2019

== Works cited ==
- Gifford, John; McWilliam, Colin; Walker, David (1991). Edinburgh. The Buildings of Scotland. Penguin Books. ISBN 978-0-300-09672-9.
- Gibson, Mark (text); Stephen, Vanessa (artwork) (2020). A Guide to Old St Paul's (PDF). Old St Paul's Scottish Episcopal Church.
- Cole, Gilbert (1988). A Church in Goldenacre. The Rector and Vestry of St James.
