= St Ninian's Cathedral =

Coordinates: 56°23′56.9″N 3°26′7.6″W

- Cathedral Church of St Ninian
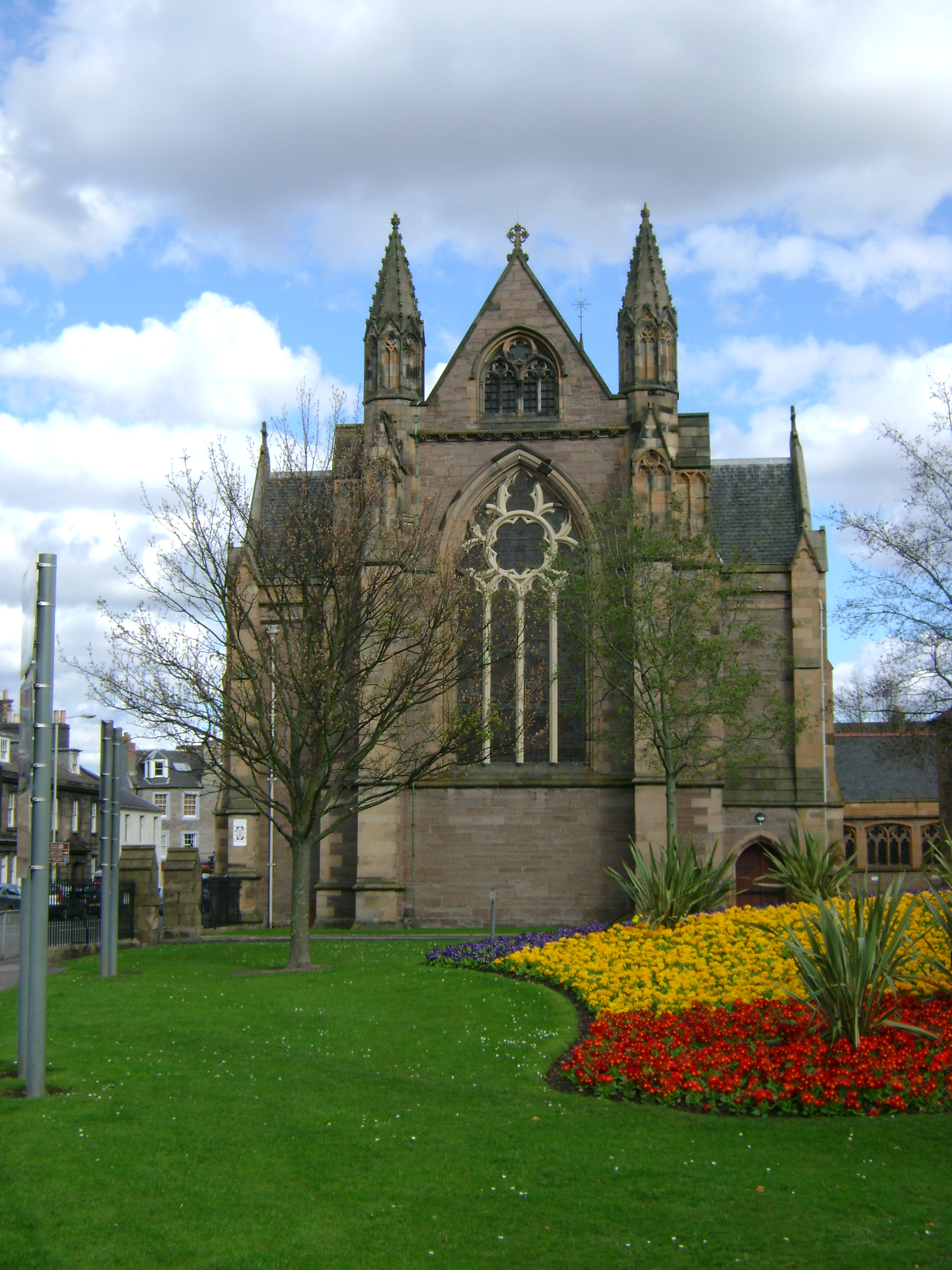
- St Ninian's Cathedral
- Location: Perth
- Country: Scotland
- Denomination: Scottish Episcopal Church
- Churchmanship: Anglo-Catholic
- Website: www.perthcathedral.co.uk

History
- Dedication: Saint Ninian
- Consecrated: 10 December 1850

Administration
- Diocese: St Andrews, Dunkeld and Dunblane

Clergy
- Bishop: Ian Paton

St Ninian's Cathedral in Perth is a cathedral of the Scottish Episcopal Church in the Diocese of St Andrews, Dunkeld and Dunblane.

== History ==
The Episcopal Church in Scotland was disestablished in 1689 and all the Scottish cathedrals became the property of the Presbyterian Church, either falling into disuse or becoming adapted for the Presbyterian rite. In 1848 two young Scottish aristocrats at Oxford University conceived the idea of reviving cathedrals for the Episcopalians and the London architect William Butterfield was chosen to design a cathedral for Perth. £5751 was raised by subscription and of this less than £150 came from local sources, the bulk coming from the families of Lord Forbes and the Hon. George Boyle. This was enough to build the chancel and one bay of the nave and the north wall to its full eventual length, to be consecrated on 10 December 1850. The bishop of the diocese, the Rt. Rev. Patrick Torry aged eighty-six was too frail to preside, and the ceremonies were conducted by the Rt. Rev. Alexander Penrose Forbes of Brechin. The patrons wanted to name it St John the Apostle's presumably as some sort of riposte to the Presbyterians with St John's Kirk named after the Baptist but Bishop Torry named it after Ninian who brought the Christian message to Scotland in the 5th century. Stained-glass to the design of Butterfield and made by Alexander Gibbs was added in 1876 to the east window, showing "The one seated on the throne" from Revelation 4:1ff.

Under its first provost St Ninian's Cathedral was a centre for advanced Ritualism in worship, which was wholly unacceptable to the new Protestant-minded Bishop Charles Wordsworth, elected to succeed Torry following his death in 1852. In its first thirty years the congregation flourished and its membership included those of all classes. It was notable for baptising the children of single mothers who had been refused baptism by other Perth churches. With the appointment in 1885 of the Rev. Vincent Rorison as provost the attendance grew considerably, and it was decided to complete Butterfield's original design with alterations to the towers at the west end and completed in 1890. All the stained-glass added subsequently is by Burlison and Grylls. Following the death of Wordsworth in 1892 the Rt. Rev. George Howard Wilkinson who had earlier retired as Bishop of Truro was elected to succeed him, and he engaged John Loughborough Pearson, the architect of Truro Cathedral to carry out alterations and additions, the work beginning in 1900 including a design for the Chapter House and Lady Chapel completed in 1908 with an east window by Whitefriars Glass. Following his death in 1907 Wilkinson was commemorated with a statue by Sir George Frampton in bronze. Further additions to the cloisters were added by Tarbolton & Ochterlony in 1936.

The pulpit (1901), carved by Nathaniel Hitch, depicts St Cuthbert holding the head of King Oswald, St Kentigern preaching to the workers, St Patrick preaching to Irish princesses and St Columba, seen with King Brude.

The cathedral was designated as a Category A listed building in 1965.

== Provosts ==
Former provosts of the cathedral include Edward Fortescue; he resigned in 1871 before he converted to Roman Catholicism.

== Gallery ==
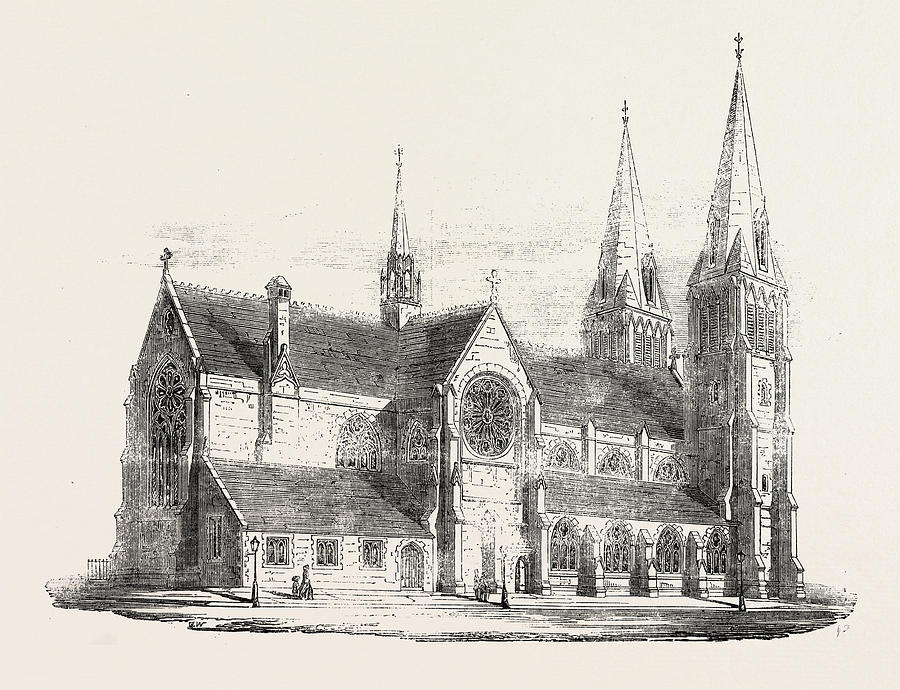
The original design for the cathedral, ultimately built without the towers as the clay soil could not support them, except at great cost

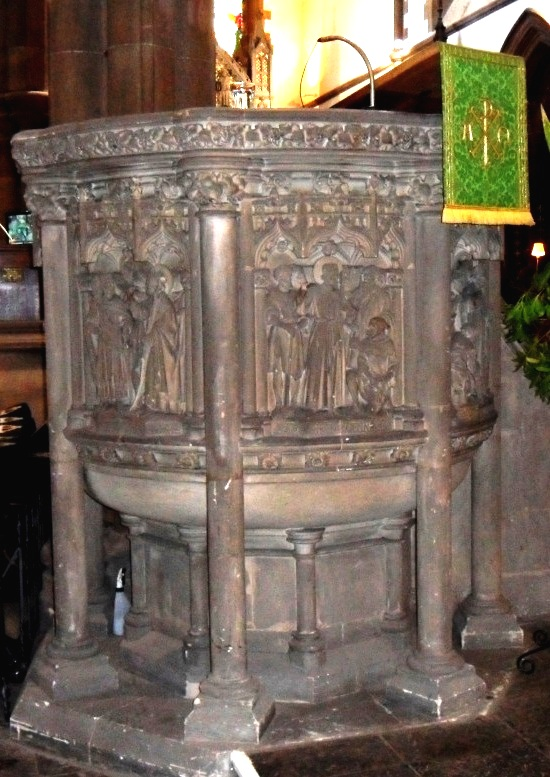
The pulpit carved by Nathaniel Hitch

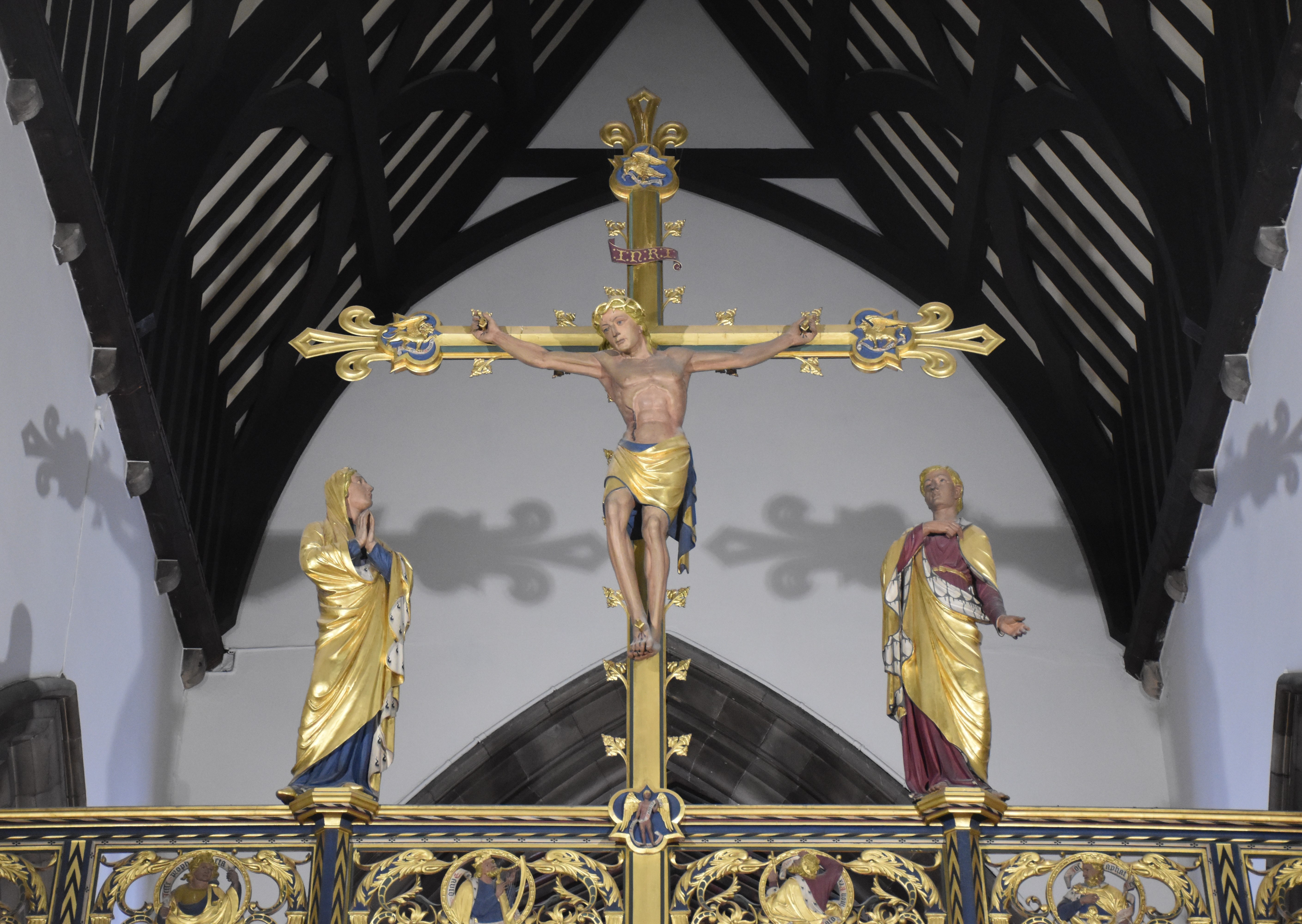
Christ on the Cross with Mary and John, rood designed by Ninian Comper (1924)

== See also ==
- List of Category A listed buildings in Perth and Kinross
- List of listed buildings in Perth, Scotland
- St John the Baptist Episcopal Church, Perth
