= Diocese of St Andrews, Dunkeld and Dunblane =

Anglican diocese of the Scottish Episcopal Church

Diocese of St Andrews, Dunkeld and Dunblane Dioecesis Sancti Andreae, Dunkeldensis et Dunblanensis

Location
- Country: Scotland
- Territory: Fife, Perthshire, Kinross-shire, Clackmannanshire, eastern and central Stirlingshire
- Ecclesiastical province: Scotland
- Coordinates: 56.395°N 3.435°W

Statistics
- Congregations: 53

Information
- Denomination: Scottish Episcopal Church
- Cathedral: St Ninian's Cathedral, Perth

Current leadership
- Bishop: Ian Paton

Map
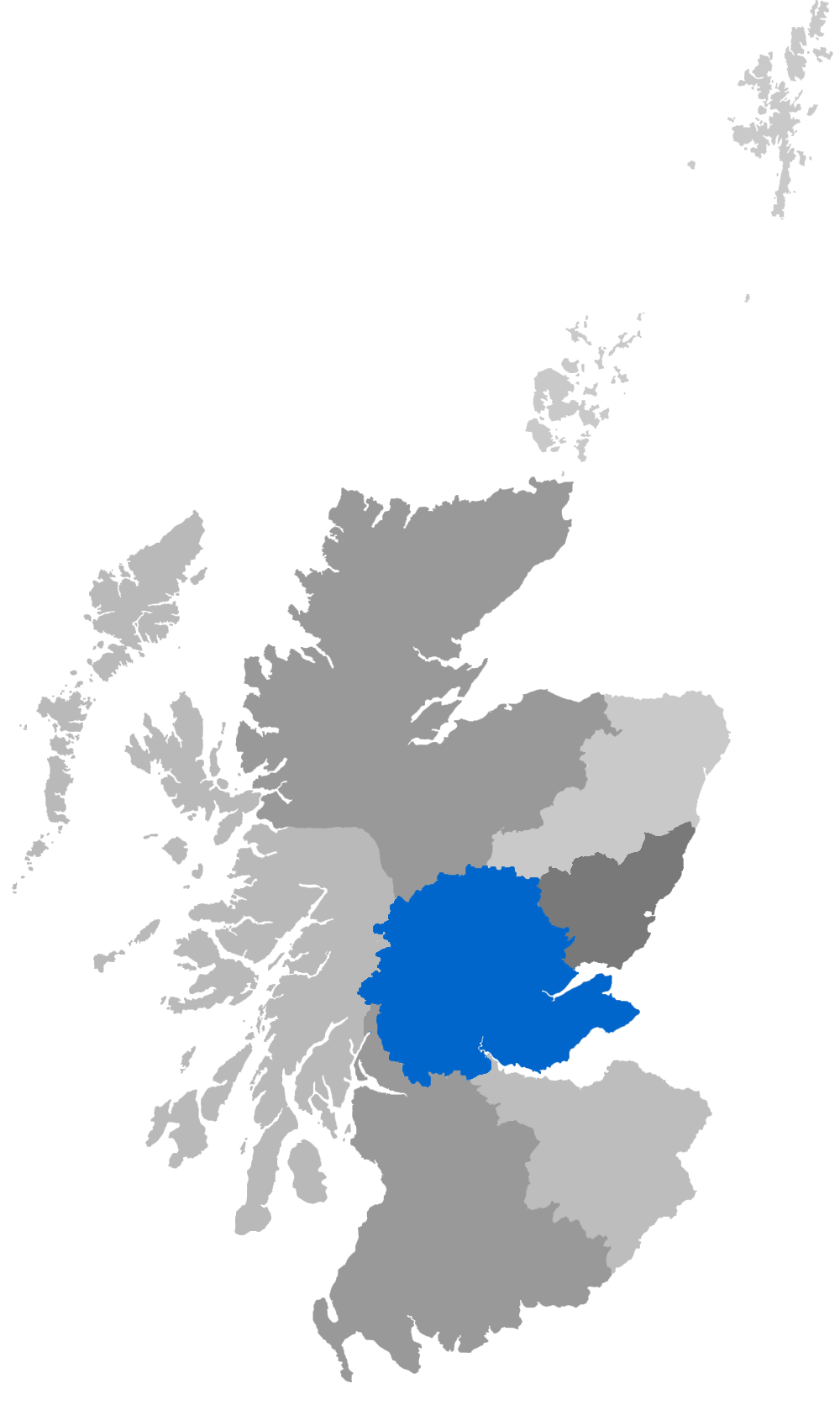
- Map showing St Andrews Diocese within Scotland

Website
- standrews.anglican.org

The Diocese of St Andrews, Dunkeld and Dunblane is one of the seven dioceses of the Scottish Episcopal Church, part of the Anglican Communion. It is centred on St Ninian's Cathedral in Perth, and covers Fife, Perthshire, Kinross-shire, Clackmannanshire, and eastern and central Stirlingshire (western Stirlingshire is in the Diocese of Glasgow and Galloway). The current Bishop of St Andrews, Dunkeld and Dunblane is Ian Paton.

The diocese continues the titles of three ancient Scottish dioceses. The Diocese of St Andrews was founded in 906 and was raised to an archdiocese in 1472. Throughout the Scottish Reformation the diocese continued under the auspices of moderate, Episcopalian reformers. From 1704 until 1726, the archbishopric was vacant, until it was recreated as the Diocese of Fife. In 1842, the diocese, no longer an archdiocese, was moved back to St Andrews and united with the Diocese of Dunkeld and Dunblane.

The Diocese of Dunkeld is thought to have begun in the 9th century, but the first reliable date is that of the consecration of Cormac as bishop in 1114. The line of bishops continued with only a few vacancies until, in 1842, the diocese was united with St Andrews. In 1878, the Roman Catholic Church revived the Diocese of Dunkeld as part of its structures in Scotland.

The Diocese of Dunblane was founded in 1162. Its line of bishops continued with a few vacancies until it was united with the Diocese of Dunkeld in 1776.

== Area and population ==
The diocese covers the historic counties of Perthshire (population 155,000), the Forfar and Kirriemuir areas of Angus (population 30,500), Clackmannanshire (population 51,000), Kinross-shire (population 11,500), Fife (population 365,000), and central Stirlingshire (population 90,000).

This total population of approximately 703,000 gives the diocese a ratio of one priest to every 37,000 inhabitants and one church to every 14,600 inhabitants.

== List of churches ==
The diocese currently has 47 churches and 24 stipendiary clergy.

Last fully updated 28 October 2021.

Benefice	Churches	Link	Clergy	Ref
Killin (St Fillan)	St Fillan, Killin		Rector: Genevieve Evans	
Lochearnhead (St Angus)	St Angus, Lochearnhead		Rector: Genevieve Evans	
Comrie (St Serf)	St Serf, Comrie		Rector: Genevieve Evans	
Crieff (St Columba)	St Columba, Crieff		Rector: Genevieve Evans	
Auchterarder (St Kessog)	St Kessog, Auchterarder		Priest-in-Charge: Tracy Dowling	
Muthill (St James)	St James, Muthill		Priest-in-Charge: Tracy Dowling	
Kilmaveonaig (St Adamnan)	St Adamnan, Kilmaveonaig		Rector: Liz Baker	
Kinloch Rannoch (All Saints)	All Saints, Kinloch Rannoch		Rector: Liz Baker	
Strathtay (St Andrew)	St Andrew, Strathtay		Rector: Liz Baker	
Pitlochry (Holy Trinity)	Holy Trinity, Pitlochry		Rector: Liz Baker	
Dunkeld (St Mary) with Birnam	St Mary, Birnam		Priest in Charge: Lesley-Ann Craddock	
Stanley (St Columba)	St Columba, Stanley		Rector: Carrie Applegath	
Perth (Cathedral of St Ninian)	St Ninian's Cathedral, Perth		Provost: vacant; Hon Curate Celia Matthews; Hon Curate Richard Sutton	
Perth (St John the Baptist)	St John the Baptist, Perth		Rector: Graham Taylor; Curate: Annie Hughes	
Alyth (St Ninian)	St Ninian, Alyth		Rector: Kim Lafferty; NSM: David Cameron; NSM Janice Cameron	
Ballintuim (St Michael and All Angels)	St Michael, Ballintuim		Rector: Kim Lafferty; NSM: David Cameron; NSM Janice Cameron	
Blairgowrie (St Catherine)	St Catharine, Blairgowrie		Rector: Kim Lafferty; NSM: David Cameron; NSM Janice Cameron	
Coupar Angus (St Anne)	St Anne, Coupar Angus		Rector: Kim Lafferty; NSM: David Cameron; NSM Janice Cameron	
Kirriemuir (St Mary)	St Mary, Kirriemuir		Priest-in-Charge: Vacancy	
Forfar (St John the Evangelist)	St John the Evangelist, Forfar		Rector: Elaine Garman	
Lunan Head (St Margaret)	St Margaret, Lunanhead		Rector: Elaine Garman	
Aberfoyle (St Mary)	St Mary, Aberfoyle		Rector: Jonathan D Connell	
Callander (St Andrew)	St Andrew, Callander		Rector: Jonathan D Connell	
Doune (St Modoc)	St Modoc, Doune		Rector: Alison Peden	
Dunblane (St Mary)	St Mary, Dunblane		Rector: Nerys Brown; Hon Curate: Jeanette Allan; Hon Curate: Moira Jamieson; Hon Curate: Peter Potter	
Bridge of Allan (St Saviour)	St Saviour, Bridge of Allan		Rector: Jo Mulliner	
Stirling (Holy Trinity)	Holy Trinity, Stirling		Rector: Christoph Wutscher	
Alloa (St John the Evangelist)	St John the Evangelist, Alloa		Priest-in-Charge: Vacant	
Dollar (St James the Great)	St James the Great, Dollar		Rector: Christopher Lowdon	
Kinross (St Paul)	St Paul, Kinross		Rector: David Mackenzie Mills	
Dunfermline (Holy Trinity)	Holy Trinity, Dunfermline		Rector: Vacant	
Dunfermline (Holy Trinity)	St Margaret, Rosyth		Rector: Vacant	
Aberdour (St Columba) - All Souls Fife	St Columba, Aberdour		Priest-in-Charge: Dean Norby; NSM: Carol Latimer	
Burntisland (St Serf) - All Souls Fife	St Serf, Burntisland		Priest-in-Charge: Dean Norby; NSM: Carol Latimer	
Inverkeithing (St Peter) - All Souls Fife	St Peter, Inverkeithing		Priest-in-Charge: Dean Norby; NSM: Carol Latimer	
Kirkcaldy (St Peter)	St Peter, Kirkcaldy		Rector: Christine Fraser	
Kinghorn (St Mary and St Leonard)	SS Mary & Leonard, Kinghorn		Rector: Christine Fraser	
Leven (St Margaret) - Central Fife Team Ministry	St Margaret, Leven		Priest in Charge: Bonnie Evans-Hills	
Glenrothes (St Luke the Evangelist) - Central Fife Team Ministry	St Luke, Glenrothes		Rector: Gerry Dillon	
Lochgelly (St Finnian) - Central Fife Team Ministry	St Finnian, Lochgelly		Rector: Gerry Dillon	
Ladybank (St Mary)	St Mary, Ladybank		Rector: Vacant; Pastoral Care (during vacancy): Bob Gillies; Hon. Curate (Cupar): Jenni Black	
Cupar (St James the Great)	St James the Great, Cupar		Rector: Vacant; Pastoral Care (during vacancy): Bob Gillies; Hon. Curate (Cupar): Jenni Black	
Newport-On-Tay (St Mary)	St Mary, Newport-on-Tay		Rector: Kathy Barrable	
Tayport (St Margaret of Scotland)	St Margaret of Scotland, Tayport		Rector: Kathy Barrable	
St Andrews (St Andrew)	St Andrew, St Andrews		Rector: Trevor Hart; NSM: Richard Evans	
St Andrews (All Saints)	All Saints, St Andrews		Rector: Alasdair Coles; NSM: Ian Michael; Hon. Curate: David Day; Hon. Curate: Malcolm Aldcroft; Hon. Curate: Gareth Saunders; Hon. Curate Bob Harley; Hon. Curate Anne Haselhurst	
Elie and Earlsferry (St Michael and All Angels)	St Michael & All Angels, Elie		Rector: Steve Butler	
Pittenweem (St John the Evangelist)	St John the Evangelist, Pittenweem		Rector: Steve Butler	

=== Closed churches ===
Church	Founded	Closed	Ref
St Margaret, Meigle	1852	c. 1952	
St Katherine, Newburgh	1887	1987	
Holy Spirit, St Fillans		c. 1989	

== See also ==
- Archdiocese of St Andrews
- Diocese of Dunkeld
- Diocese of Dunblane
- Roman Catholic Archdiocese of St Andrews and Edinburgh
- Roman Catholic Diocese of Dunkeld
