= Frederick Goldie =

Scottish bishop

The Right Reverend Frederick Goldie
- Bishop of Glasgow and Galloway
- Church: Scottish Episcopal Church
- Diocese: Glasgow and Galloway
- In office: 1974–1980
- Predecessor: Francis Moncreiff
- Successor: Derek Rawcliffe

Orders
- Ordination: 1939 by John How
- Consecration: 22 November 1974 by Richard Wimbush

Personal details
- Born: 1 September 1914 Glasgow, Scotland
- Died: 23 October 1980 (aged 66) Glasgow, Scotland
- Denomination: Anglican
- Parents: John & Maria Goldie
- Spouse: Margaret Baker McCrae (m. 1940)
- Children: 2
- Education: Hatfield College, Durham

Frederick Goldie (1 September 1914 – 23 October 1980) was a Scottish Anglican bishop.

== Early life and education ==
Goldie was born in Glasgow, Scotland, on 1 September 1914, the son of John and Maria Goldie. He was educated at Hatfield College, Durham, from where he earned his Bachelor of Arts degree and a Licentiate of Theology in 1938 and a Master of Arts in 1946. He also studied at the Edinburgh Theological College between 1934 and 1938. He then studied at the New College, Edinburgh of the University of Edinburgh, from where he graduated with a Bachelor of Divinity in 1939.

== Ordained ministry ==
Goldie was ordained deacon in 1938 and priest in 1939 by the Bishop of Glasgow and Galloway. He served as a curate at the Good Shepherd Church in Hillington between 1938 and 1946, after which he became rector of the same church, remaining there until 1949. Between 1944 and 1946, he also served as priest-in-charge of Ascension Church in Glasgow. In 1949, he was appointed rector of St Augustine's Church in Dumbarton. He was a lecturer at the Edinburgh Theological College from 1940 until 1963. In 1963, he became Dean of Glasgow and Galloway, and subsequently rector of St Margaret's Church, until 1974.

=== Bishop ===
In 1974, he was elected Bishop of Glasgow and Galloway and was consecrated on 22 November 1974 at St Mary's Cathedral, Glasgow.

A noted ecclesiastical historian, he died in post.

Anglican Communion titles
| Preceded by Eric Brereton | Dean of Glasgow and Galloway; 1963 – 1974 | Succeeded by Samuel Singer |
| Preceded by Francis Moncreiff | Bishop of Glasgow and Galloway; 1974 – 1980 | Succeeded by Derek Rawcliffe |
