= John Taylor (bishop of Glasgow and Galloway) =

Scottish bishop (1932–2021)

The Right Reverend John Mitchell Taylor
- Bishop of Glasgow and Galloway
- Church: Scottish Episcopal Church
- Diocese: Glasgow and Galloway
- Elected: March 1991
- In office: 1991–1996
- Predecessor: Derek Rawcliffe
- Successor: Idris Jones

Orders
- Ordination: 1957 by Frederick Easson
- Consecration: May 1991 by George Henderson

Personal details
- Born: 23 May 1932 Aberdeen, Aberdeenshire, Scotland
- Died: 18 November 2021 (aged 89)
- Denomination: Anglican
- Spouse: Edna Elizabeth Maitland (m. 1959)
- Children: 2
- Education: University of Aberdeen

John Mitchell Taylor (23 May 1932 – 18 November 2021) was a Scottish bishop. He was the Bishop of Glasgow and Galloway in the Scottish Episcopal Church from 1991 to 1996.

== Early life and education ==
Taylor was born in Aberdeen. He was educated at Banff Academy, and then at the University of Aberdeen between 1951 and 1954, graduating with a Master of Arts in 1954. He then studied at the Edinburgh Theological College between 1954 and 1956.

== Ordained ministry ==
He was ordained deacon in 1956, and priest in 1957 by the Bishop of Aberdeen and Orkney. He was assistant curate at St Margaret's Church in Aberdeen (1956–1958) and then curate (1958–1959) and rector (1959–1964) of Holy Cross Church in Glasgow. He then served as rector of St Ninian's Church in Glasgow (1964–1973) and St John the Evangelist Church in Dumfries (1973–1991), his final appointment before his ordination to the episcopate. He also was a canon of St Mary's cathedral chapter between 1979 and 1991. Subsequently, whilst in Dumfries, he was chaplain at the Crichton Royal Hospital, the Dumfries and Galloway Royal Infirmary and HM Prison Dumfries.

=== Bishop ===
Taylor was elected Bishop of Glasgow and Galloway in March 1991 and was consecrated in May 1991. He retired in 1996 and became an honorary canon of St Mary's Cathedral in 1999.

Scottish Episcopal Church titles
Preceded by Derek Rawcliffe	Bishop of Glasgow and Galloway; 1991 – 1996	Succeeded by Idris Jones
