= Watson Reid =

James Watson Reid (1827 – 1891) was a Scottish Episcopalian priest: he was Dean of Glasgow and Galloway from 1890 to 1903.

He was born in 1827, educated at the University of Glasgow;and ordained in 1849. He was Chaplain to the Bishop of Glasgow and Galloway from 1849 to 1859; Priest in charge of Baillieston from 1850 to 1854; in charge of the Jordanhill Mission from 1854 to 1856; and the Incumbent at Christ Church, Glasgow from 1857 until his death on 5 February 1891.

Anglican Communion titles
Preceded by Frederick Edward Ridgeway	Dean of Glasgow and Galloway; 1890–1903	Succeeded by Michael Balfour Hutchison
