= James Ligo =

Anglican Bishop of Vanuatu and New Caledonia

- Bishop of Vanuatu and New Caledonia
- Church: Anglican Church of Melanesia
- See: Diocese of Vanuatu and New Caledonia
- In office: 2006 — 2017
- Predecessor: Hue Blessing Boe
- Successor: James Tama

James Marvin Ligo (died December 2017) was the Anglican Bishop of Vanuatu and New Caledonia, one of the eight dioceses that make up the Anglican Church of Melanesia. He was consecrated and installed as Bishop of Vanuatu on 15 October 2006; the name of his diocese was changed during his time, so he became Bishop of Vanuatu and New Caledonia; he was succeeded as bishop by James Tama.

Ligo was also the Chairman of the Vanuatu Christian Council.
