= Michael Hutchison =

Michael Hutchison may refer to:

- Michael Hutchison (politician), Scottish politician
- Michael Hutchison (priest), Scottish priest
- Michael Hutchison (judge), British lawyer and judge

== See also ==
- Michael Hutchinson (disambiguation)
