= Derek Rawcliffe =

English Anglican bishop

The Right Reverend Derek Rawcliffe OBE
- Bishop of Glasgow and Galloway
- Church: Scottish Episcopal Church
- Diocese: Glasgow and Galloway
- Elected: 1980
- In office: 1981–1991
- Predecessor: Frederick Goldie
- Successor: John Taylor
- Other post: Assistant Bishop of Ripon (1991-1996)
- Previous posts: Archdeacon of Southern Melanesia; Assistant Bishop of Melanesia (1974-1975); Bishop of the New Hebrides (1975-1980)

Orders
- Ordination: 1945 by William Wilson Cash
- Consecration: 25 January 1974 by Allen Johnston

Personal details
- Born: 8 July 1921 Manchester, England
- Died: 1 February 2011 (aged 89) Leeds, England
- Parents: James Alec, Gwendoline Rawcliffe
- Spouse: Susan Speight (m. 1977; died 1987)
- Education: Sir Thomas Rich's School
- Alma mater: Leeds University

Derek Alec Rawcliffe OBE (8 July 1921 – 1 February 2011) was an English Anglican bishop and author. He served as the Bishop of the New Hebrides and the Scottish Episcopal Church's Bishop of Glasgow and Galloway.

== Life and ministry ==
Rawcliffe was born in Manchester, the son of a tobacconist, on 8 July 1921. He was brought up in Gloucester and educated at Leeds University. He was ordained deacon in 1944 and priest in 1945. After a curacy at Claines St George, Worcester, between 1944 and 1947, he became a teacher in the Solomon Islands until 1953, when he became Archdeacon of Southern Melanesia and the New Hebrides. He was Assistant Bishop of Melanesia between 1974 and 1975, and then became the first Bishop of the New Hebrides, serving from 1975 to 1980 when he was translated to Glasgow and Galloway, in the Scottish Episcopal Church on 20 January 1981 in Scotland. He retired on 28 February 1991.

After retirement he was made an honorary assistant bishop in the Diocese of Ripon, where he became the first bishop in the Church of England to announce that he was gay, after disclosing his sexuality on television in 1995. Rawcliffe later argued for the age of consent for homosexual relations to be reduced to 14.

Rawcliffe died on 1 February 2011 at the age of 89.

== Archives ==
Rawcliffe's papers are held by SOAS Archives.

Anglican Communion titles
New title	Bishop of the New Hebrides; 1975–1980	Succeeded by Harry Tevi
Preceded by Frederick Goldie	Bishop of Glasgow and Galloway; 1981–1991	Succeeded by John Taylor
