= St Oswald's Church, Maybole =

Coordinates: 55.3553°N 4.6847°W

- St Oswald's Church, Maybole
- Denomination: Scottish Episcopal Church
- Website: stoswaldsmaybole.org.uk

History
- Dedication: Saint Oswald of Northumbria

Architecture
- Completed: 1883

Administration
- Province: Scottish Episcopal Church
- Diocese: Glasgow & Galloway

Clergy
- Bishop: The Rt Rev. Kevin Pearson
- Priest: The Rev. Liz Crumlish

St Oswald's Church is a congregation of the Scottish Episcopal Church located in Maybole, Ayrshire, Scotland. The current Priest-in-Charge is The Rev. Liz Crumlish.

== History ==
The congregation was established in 1847 by Rev. William Scot Wilson, then rector of Holy Trinity in Ayr, to serve the English and Irish weavers in the area. There was no permanent church; the congregation met in a room on Abbot Street and were served by clergy from Girvan.

In 1883, Wilson, who by then had been appointed Bishop of Glasgow and Galloway, agreed to the construction of a permanent church in 1883. St Oswald's Church was completed the same year and consecrated by Bishop Wilson on 18 December 1883.

St Oswald's Church contains one of the few remaining pipe organs in Maybole, manufactured in 1893 by Alfred Kirkland.

== Previous rectors ==
- 1847-1911 Charge served from Girvan.
- 1911-1932 Charge served from Holy Trinity, Ayr.
- 1932-1934 Harry Rowley
- 1934-1941 Charge served from Holy Trinity, Ayr.
- 1941-1943 Thomas Veitch
- 1944-1947 Leonard David Barnes
- 1947-1949 William Howard Dale Chapman
- 1949-1952 Richard Claud Wylie
- 1952-1963 Ernest Jauncey
- 1963-1984 Charge served from Ayr.
- 1984-1995 Charge served from Girvan.
- 1995-2017 Charge served from Ayr.
- 2017-2023 James William Geen
- 2023- Elizabeth Anne Crumlish
