= William Routledge =

William Routledge may refer to:

- William Routledge (priest), Scottish Episcopalian priest
- William Scoresby Routledge, British ethnographer, anthropologist and adventurer
- Bill Routledge, English footballer
