= Douglas Reid (priest) =

British priest (1934–2000)

Douglas William John Reid (1934 - 2000) was Dean of Glasgow and Galloway from 1987 to 1997.

He was born on 15 February 1934, educated at Edinburgh Theological College;and ordained deacon in 1963, and priest in 1964. After a curacy in Ayr he was the Rector of St James, Glasgow from 1968 until 1973; and then of St Ninian, Glasgow from 1973 to 1999.

He died on 18 March 2000.

Anglican Communion titles
Preceded by Samuel Singer	Glasgow and Galloway; 1987–1997	Succeeded by Gregor Duthie Duncan
