= Richard Oldham (priest) =

Richard Samuel Oldham (1823–1914) was a Scottish Episcopalian priest: he was Dean of Glasgow and Galloway from 1878 to 1888.

He was educated at Wadham College, Oxford;and ordained deacon in 1856, and priest in 1847. After curacies in St Pancras and Kensington he was Chaplain to the Earl of Elgin from 1851 to 1853. He was the Incumbent at St Mary Glasgow from 1853 to 1878. He was Rector of Little Chart from 1881 until 1905; and Perpetual Curate at the Grosvenor Chapel from 1878 to 1881.

He died on 24 June 1914.

Anglican Communion titles
Preceded by Alexander Henderson	Dean of Glasgow and Galloway; 1877–1878	Succeeded by John Moir
