= John Moir (priest) =

John Moir (1814–1889) was a Scottish Episcopalian priest.

The son of David Moir, Bishop of Brechin, he was born in 1814, educated at King's College, Aberdeen;and ordained in 1837. He was the Incumbent at Arradoul then Brechin. He was Dean of Brechin from 1848 to 1861; the Incumbent of Jedburgh from 1861 to 1888; and Dean of Glasgow and Galloway from 1878 to 1888.

He died on 5 December 1889.

Anglican Communion titles
Preceded by Heneage Horsley	Dean of Brechin; 1848–1861	Succeeded by Robert Thom
Preceded by Richard Samuel Oldham	Dean of Glasgow and Galloway; 1878–1888	Succeeded by Frederick Edward Ridgeway
