= Gregor Duncan (bishop) =

Scottish Episcopalian bishop (1950–2025)

The Right Reverend Gregor Duncan
- Bishop of Glasgow and Galloway
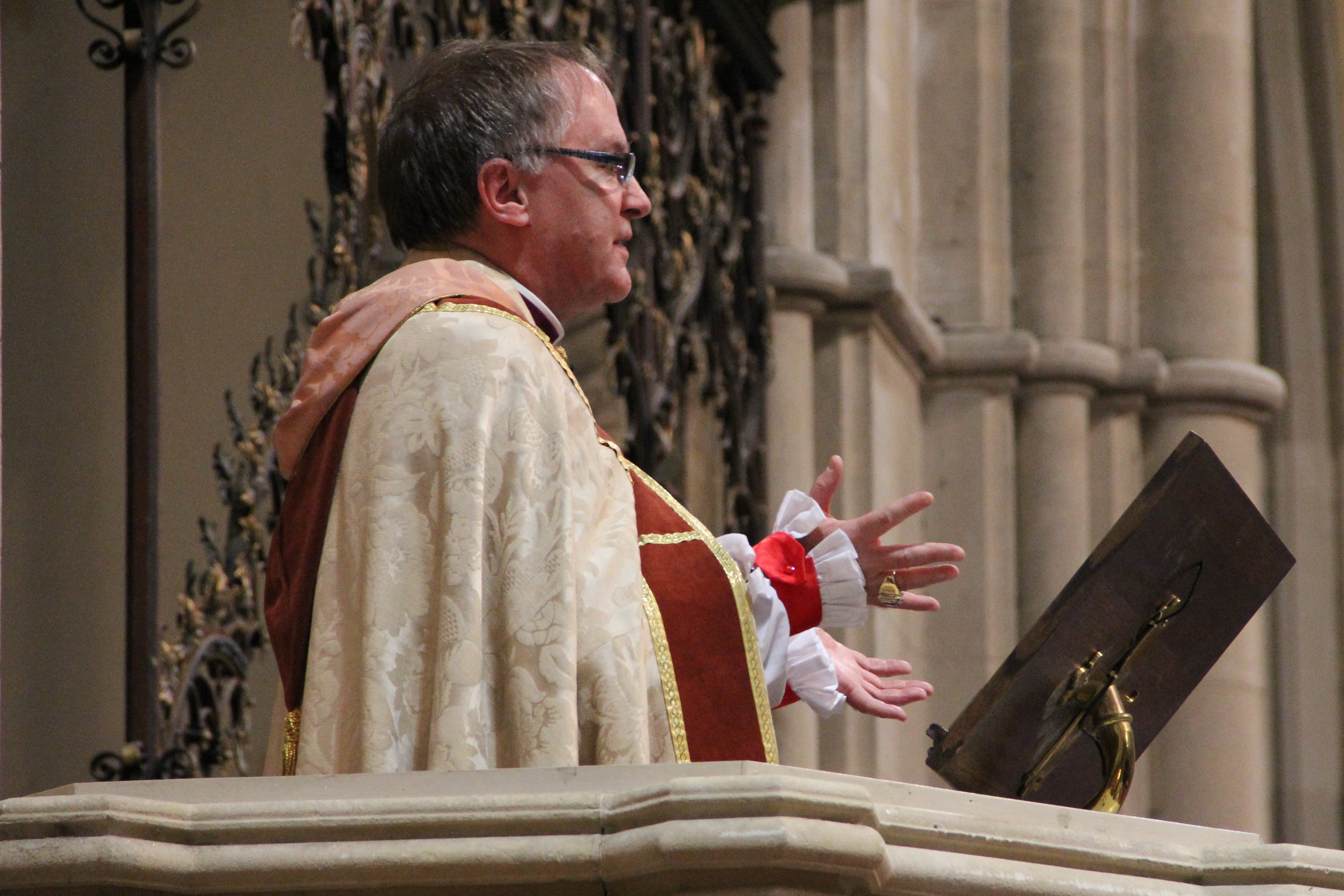
- Duncan preaching in 2012
- Church: Scottish Episcopal Church
- Elected: 16 January 2010
- In office: 2010–2018
- Predecessor: Idris Jones
- Successor: Kevin Pearson

Orders
- Ordination: 1984 by Douglas Feaver
- Consecration: 23 April 2010 by David Chillingworth

Personal details
- Born: 11 October 1950
- Died: 21 November 2025 (aged 75)
- Denomination: Anglican
- Parents: Edwin John Duncan, Janet Brown
- Education: University of Glasgow; Clare College, Cambridge

Gregor Duthie Duncan (11 October 1950 – 21 November 2025) was an Anglican bishop of the Scottish Episcopal Church who served as the Bishop of Glasgow and Galloway from 2010 to 2018.

== Early life ==
Duncan was born on 11 October 1950. He was educated at Allan Glen's School, a boys' state selective school in Glasgow. He went on to study at the University of Glasgow and Clare College, Cambridge. He studied for the priesthood at Ripon College Cuddesdon.

== Ordained ministry ==
Duncan was ordained deacon in 1983 and priest in 1984 by the Bishop of Peterborough. He began his ordained ministry as an assistant curate at Oakham. After this he was chaplain of Edinburgh Theological College followed by rector of St Columba's, Largs, then St Ninian's, Pollokshields, in Glasgow. He was Dean of Glasgow and Galloway until his appointment to the episcopate in 2010.

On 16 January 2010, he was elected Bishop of Glasgow and Galloway. He was consecrated and installed at St Mary's Cathedral in Glasgow on 23 April 2010.

== Later life and death ==
Duncan suffered a stroke in January 2017.

He announced his retirement in 2018, with a valedictory Choral Evensong taking place on 7 October 2018 at St Mary's Cathedral.

Duncan died on 21 November 2025, at the age of 75.

== Sources ==
- Bertie, David M. (2000). Scottish Episcopal Clergy, 1689-2000. Edinburgh: T & T Clark. ISBN 0-5670-8746-8. OCLC 468720326.
- Church of England. Archbishops Council (2007). Crockford's clerical directory : a directory of the clergy of the Church of England, the Church in Wales, the Scottish Episcopal Church, the Church of Ireland. 2008/2009 (100 ed.). Church House Publishing. ISBN 978-0-7151-1030-0. OCLC 505322212.

Scottish Episcopal Church titles
Preceded by Douglas Reid	Dean of Glasgow and Galloway; 1996–2010	Succeeded by Ian Barcroft
Preceded by Idris Jones	Bishop of Glasgow and Galloway; 2010–2018	Succeeded by Kevin Pearson
