= Martin How =

British composer (1931–2022)

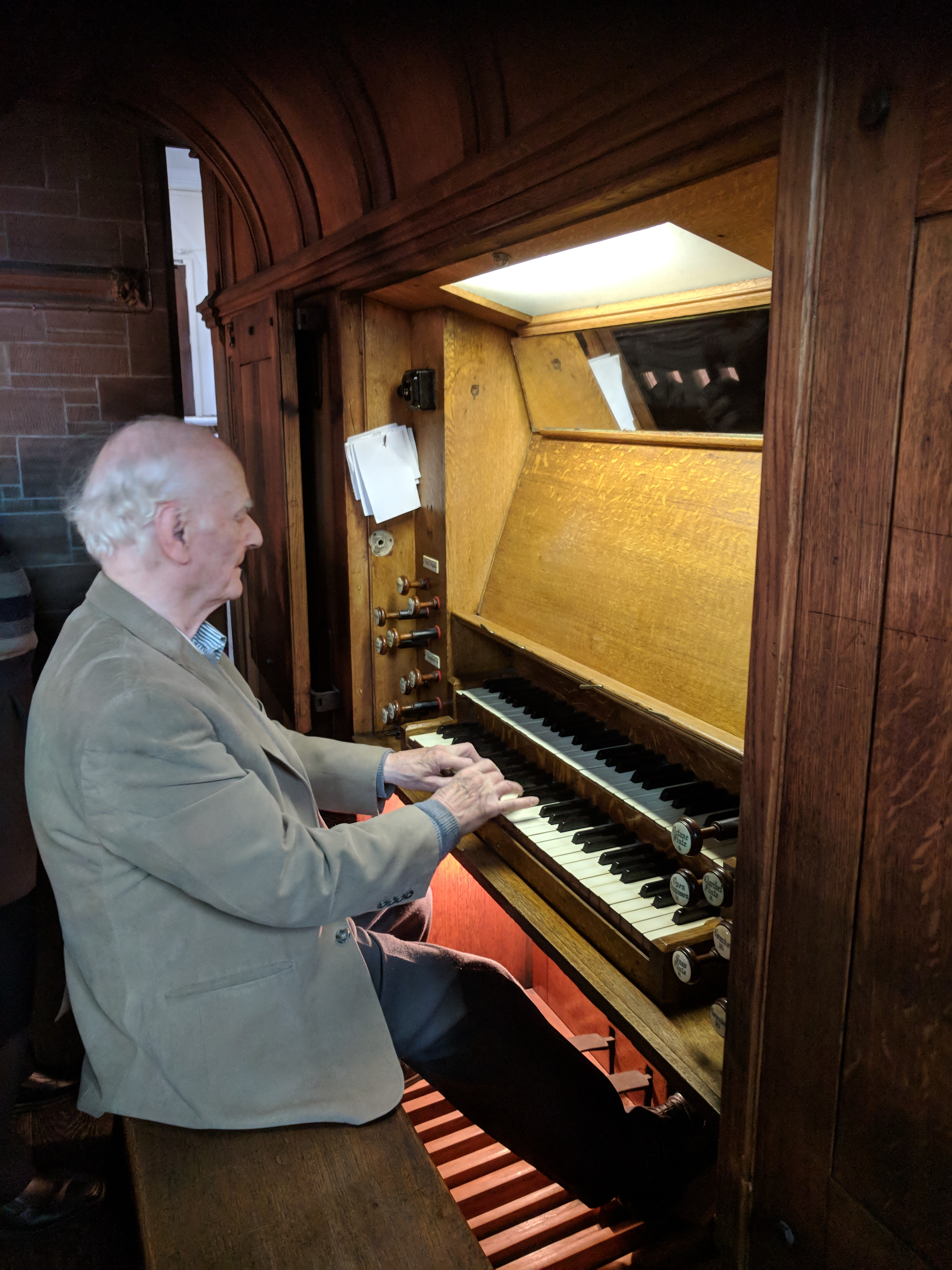
How improvising at a Gray & Davison pipe organ in Liverpool in 2018

Martin John Richard How MBE (3 April 1931 – 25 July 2022) was a British composer and organist.

== Early life and education ==
How was born in Liverpool on 3 April 1931, to the Rev. John How, who at the time was Rector of St. Nicholas Church, and Junie Katherine Reynolds, who died when How was a young boy. In 1938 his father was appointed Bishop of Glasgow and Galloway, and How spent most of his childhood in Scotland.

Educated at Repton School, where he was a music scholar, he was awarded an organ scholarship to Clare College, Cambridge, where he read music and theology. In this post he had responsibility for the Chapel Choir of men and boys and the Choral Society. He was a keen athlete and ran for the university, narrowly missing being awarded a 'Blue' for cross-country running.

== Career ==
After university How served in the army for two years, where he gained a National Service Commission, seeing the experience as invaluable for his later profession. He then worked as organist and choirmaster at Grimsby Minster and was also involved in teaching and various musical activities.

How spent most of his career with the Royal School of Church Music, where he was known principally as a choir trainer specialising in the training and motivation of young singers. In this capacity he initiated and developed the Chorister Training Scheme, which has since been used in various forms in many parts of the world. He inaugurated the Southern Cathedral Singers, a group that has frequently been broadcast on BBC Radio 3's Choral Evensong from Canterbury Cathedral and elsewhere. He also traveled widely in the United States of America, Canada, South Africa, Australia, New Zealand, Denmark, Belgium and the Netherlands as a choral conductor, accompanist, lecturer and adjudicator.

== Retirement and legacy ==
Following his retirement from the Royal School of Church Music, How continued to compose and play the organ as an honorary member of the music staff at Croydon Minster. He was awarded an MBE for services to church music in the 1993 New Year Honours.

How died on 25 July 2022, at the age of 91.
