= Barton Street =

Barton Street may refer to:

- Barton Street (Hamilton, Ontario), in Canada
  - Barton Street Arena
- Barton Street and Cowley Street, Westminster, in London, England
- Barton Street, Gloucester, in England
- Barton Street in Lincolnshire, England, an ancient trackway which crossed the River Lud at Louth.
- Barton Street railway station, in Southport, Merseyside, England
