= Samuel Singer =

Scottish episcopal cleric and Dean of Glasgow and Galloway (1920–1989)

The Very Reverend Samuel Stanfield Singer
- Dean of Glasgow and Galloway
- Church: Anglican
- Diocese: Glasgow and Galloway
- In office: 1974–1987
- Predecessor: Frederick Goldie
- Successor: Douglas William John Reid
- Other posts: Vicar, Middleton, Derbyshire; Rector, All Saints, Glasgow

Orders
- Ordination: Deacon (1943); Priest (1944)

Personal details
- Born: Samuel Stanfield Singer; May 2, 1920
- Died: 13 November 1989 (aged 69)
- Education: Trinity College, Dublin

Samuel Stanfield Singer (2 May 1920 – 13 November 1989) was a Scottish episcopal clergyman who was Dean of Glasgow and Galloway from 1974 to 1987.

== Career ==
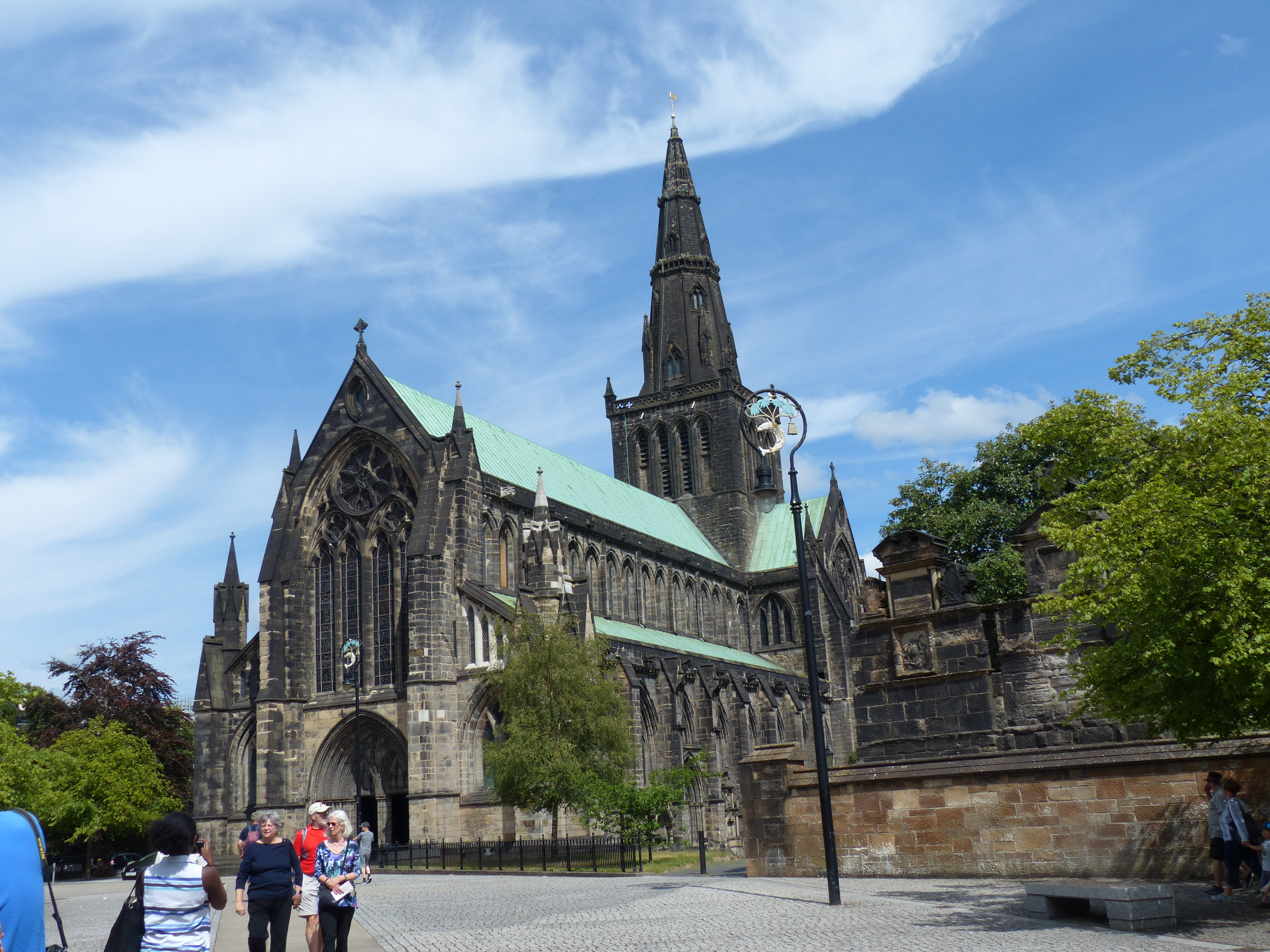
St Mary's Cathedral, Glasgow

Singer was born on 2 May 1920. He was educated at Trinity College, Dublin, and ordained a deacon in 1943, and as a priest in 1944. Following a curacy at Christ Church, Derriaghy, Northern Ireland, he was a Minor Canon at Down Cathedral from 1945 until 1947.

After another curacy in Wirksworth, Singer was Vicar of Middleton, Derbyshire, then Rector of All Saints, Glasgow. He was Dean of Glasgow and Galloway from 1974 to 1987. Singer died on 13 November 1989.

Anglican Communion titles
Preceded by Frederick Goldie	Dean of Glasgow and Galloway; 1974–1987	Succeeded by Douglas William John Reid
