= William Harrison (bishop) =

English bishop in Scottish Episcopal Church (1837–1920)

The Right Reverend William Harrison
- Bishop of Glasgow and Galloway
- Church: Scottish Episcopal Church
- Diocese: Glasgow and Galloway
- In office: 1888-1903
- Predecessor: William Wilson
- Successor: Ean Campbell

Orders
- Ordination: 1861 (deacon), 1862 (priest) by John Pelham
- Consecration: 29 September 1888 by Hugh Jermyn

Personal details
- Born: 22 September 1837 Thorpe Morieux, Suffolk, England
- Died: 11 December 1920 (aged 83) Colchester, Essex, England
- Denomination: Anglican
- Spouse: Elizabeth B. Colvin (m. 1870)
- Children: 6
- Education: Marlborough College

William Thomas Harrison (22 September 1837 – 11 December 1920) was an Anglican bishop.

== Early life and education ==
Harrison was born on 22 September 1837 into an ecclesiastical family. His father was the Reverend Thomas T. Harrison, rector of Thorpe Morieux.

He was educated at Marlborough College and Trinity College, Cambridge, graduating with a Bachelor of Arts in 1860, a Master of Arts in 1863 and a Doctor of Divinity in 1889.

== Ordained ministry ==
Harrison was ordained deacon in 1861 and priest in 1862 by the Bishop of Norwich. After a curacy in Great Yarmouth between 1861 and 1864, he became rector of his father's former parish, serving until 1875. In 1875, he became vicar of Christ Church in Luton. Simultaneously, between 1881 and 1883, he served as Rural Dean of Luton. In 1883, he became vicar of St James's Bury St Edmunds, a post he held until 1888. He served as Rural Dean of Thingoe between 1886 and 1888. He was appointed as an honorary canon of Ely Cathedral in 1880.

=== Bishop ===
Harrison was elected as the fourth Bishop of Glasgow and Galloway in 1888 and was consecrated on 29 September 1888. He retired as diocesan bishop on 30 September 1903, returned to Thorpe Morieux, and was again a vicar until his retirement in 1912. He also served as an assistant bishop in the Diocese of Ely between 1903 and 1917.

Anglican Communion titles
Preceded by William Scot Wilson	Bishop of Glasgow and Galloway; 1888 – 1903	Succeeded by Archibald Ean Campbell
