= Idris Jones =

20th and 21st-century Scottish Anglican bishop

The Right Reverend Idris Jones
- Bishop of Glasgow and Galloway; Primus of the Scottish Episcopal Church
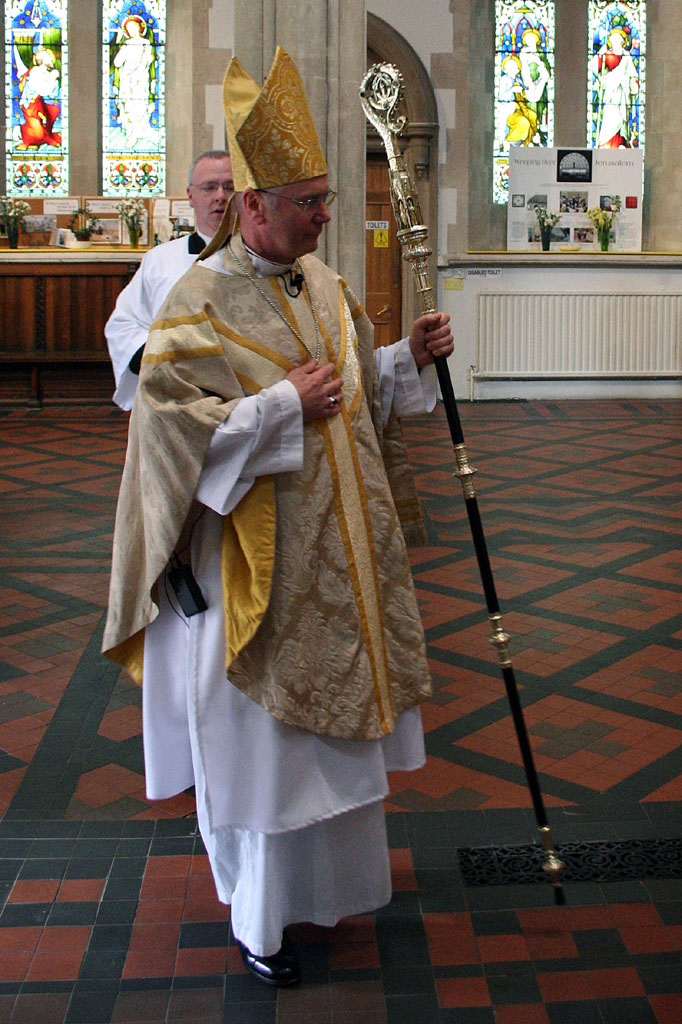
- St Mary's Cathedral in 2006
- Church: Scottish Episcopal Church
- Diocese: Glasgow and Galloway
- In office: 1996–2009
- Predecessor: John Taylor
- Successor: Gregor Duncan
- Other post: Primus of the Scottish Episcopal Church (2006-2009)

Orders
- Ordination: 1968 by Stretton Reeve
- Consecration: 12 December 1996 by Richard Holloway

Personal details
- Born: 2 April 1943 (age 83) Staffordshire, England
- Denomination: Anglican
- Parents: Edward Eric Jone, Alice Gertrude Burgess
- Children: 2
- Education: St David's University College, Lampeter; University of Edinburgh

Idris Jones (born 2 April 1943) is a retired Anglican bishop of the Scottish Episcopal Church. He was the Bishop of Glasgow and Galloway from 1998 to 2009 and was also Primus of the Scottish Episcopal Church from 2006 to 2009.

== Early life and education ==
Jones was born in 1943 and educated at West Bromwich Grammar School. He graduated from St David's University College, Lampeter, in 1964 with a Bachelor of Arts (BA) degree. He then studied for his Licentiate in Theology (LTh) at the University of Edinburgh.

== Ordained ministry ==
Jones was ordained deacon in 1967 and priest in 1968. He was a curate at Stafford Parish Church until 1970. From 1970 to 1973 he was precentor of St Paul's Cathedral in Dundee. Following this, he became team vicar of St Hugh's in Gosforth for seven years. In 1980 he became rector of Montrose. He was awarded his doctorate by the New York Theological Seminary in 1984. In 1989 he became Anglican chaplain to the University of Dundee and Rector of Invergowrie. From 1992 to 1998 he was team rector of Ayr, Maybole and Girvan until his election as Bishop of Glasgow and Galloway.

Jones was elected as Primus of the Scottish Episcopal Church by his fellow bishops on 18 May 2006, succeeding the retiring Bruce Cameron. Following a tied election result, his name was chosen as sole candidate by the drawing of lots, when he was unanimously elected as primus. He relinquished his primacy at midnight on 12 June 2009.

Jones retired on 31 July 2009.

Scottish Episcopal Church titles
Preceded by John Taylor	Bishop of Glasgow and Galloway; 1998 to 2009	Succeeded by Gregor Duthie Duncan
Preceded by Bruce Cameron	Primus of the Scottish Episcopal Church; 2006 to 2009	Succeeded by David Chillingworth
