= Sir Thomas Rich's School =

Grammar school in Gloucester, England

Location
- Oakleaze; Longlevens, Gloucester, Gloucestershire, GL2 0LF; England; 51.872954°N 2.20585°W

Information
- Type: Grammar school; Academy
- Motto: French: Garde Ta Foy (Keep your faith)
- Established: 1666; 360 years ago
- Founder: Sir Thomas Rich, 1st Baronet
- Authority: Gloucestershire County Council
- Department for Education URN: 136306 Tables
- Ofsted: Reports
- Headmaster: Matthew Lynch
- Gender: Male, with a mixed Sixth Form
- Age: 11 to 18
- Enrollment: 1,268 (Note: As of 6 October 2021)
- Houses: Northgate; Eastgate; Southgate; Westgate; Newgate
- Publication: The Richian Magazine
- Website: http://www.strschool.co.uk/

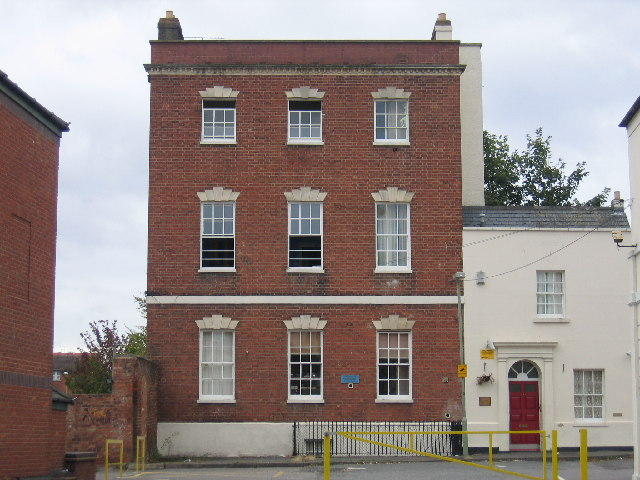
Richleigh, Barton Street, the site of the school from 1889 to 1964.

Sir Thomas Rich's School is a grammar school with academy status for boys (Note: Aged 11-18) and girls (Note: aged 16–18, in the sixth form) in Longlevens, Gloucester, England, locally known as "Tommies". It is one of seven grammar schools in Gloucestershire.

Founded as the Blue Coat Hospital, it began to function in 1668, although being founded in 1666 by Sir Thomas Rich. The school moved to a new site outside the city centre in 1964. It offers a range of teaching and sporting facilities.

== History ==
=== Foundation and Early Years ===
==== The Will ====
In Sir Thomas Rich's will of 1666 he left his Gloucester house, in Eastgate and £6,000 (a considerable sum for the time) for a school to be established for twenty poor boys in Gloucester. The money was mainly invested in farm land, with the rent paying for the running of the school. The school was opened in 1667, a year after Sir Thomas Rich's death. Sir Thomas Rich decreed that the pupils should wear "blue coats and caps according to the laudable usage of Christ Church Hospital in London." The blue drugget gown and yellow stockings were replaced in 1882 by the modern equivalent, the blue blazer. The uniform now consists of shirt, blazer (two varieties), tie (four varieties), black trousers, black socks and black or dark brown shoes.

==== Early years ====
The school officially began operations in 1668, with John Beard serving as its first Master. Initially, it was located in Rich's family estate on Eastgate Street, serving a small number of students primarily focused on basic literacy and practical trades. Over the ensuing years, the school navigated periods of stability punctuated by financial difficulties, which required intervention and support from local benefactors.

=== 18th Century Developments ===
By the 18th century, the governance of the school had shifted, with the Council of the Hospital overseeing operations. Complaints regarding the quality of education became more prevalent during this time, prompting discussions about the need for reforms. The school faced significant challenges in terms of organization and administration, leading to a series of complaints about the treatment of pupils and the overall educational environment.

==== Transition and Modernization ====
In 1836, following the Municipal Corporations Act 1835, the management of the school was transferred to the Municipal Charity Trustees, who aimed to modernize the institution and align it with contemporary educational standards. This transition coincided with the passage of the Endowed Schools Act 1869, which necessitated a reevaluation of the school's charitable status and its educational mission. The focus began to shift toward a more structured curriculum and increased attention to academic performance as societal expectations for education evolved.

In 1882, the educational institution underwent a significant reorganization and was officially renamed Sir Thomas Rich's School. This restructuring allowed for expanded academic offerings, which included traditional subjects such as Latin and Greek, alongside vocational training. The school continued to provide education primarily for boys from local working-class backgrounds, maintaining its philanthropic roots while evolving to meet the educational demands of the time. The school moved to Barton Street in 1889.

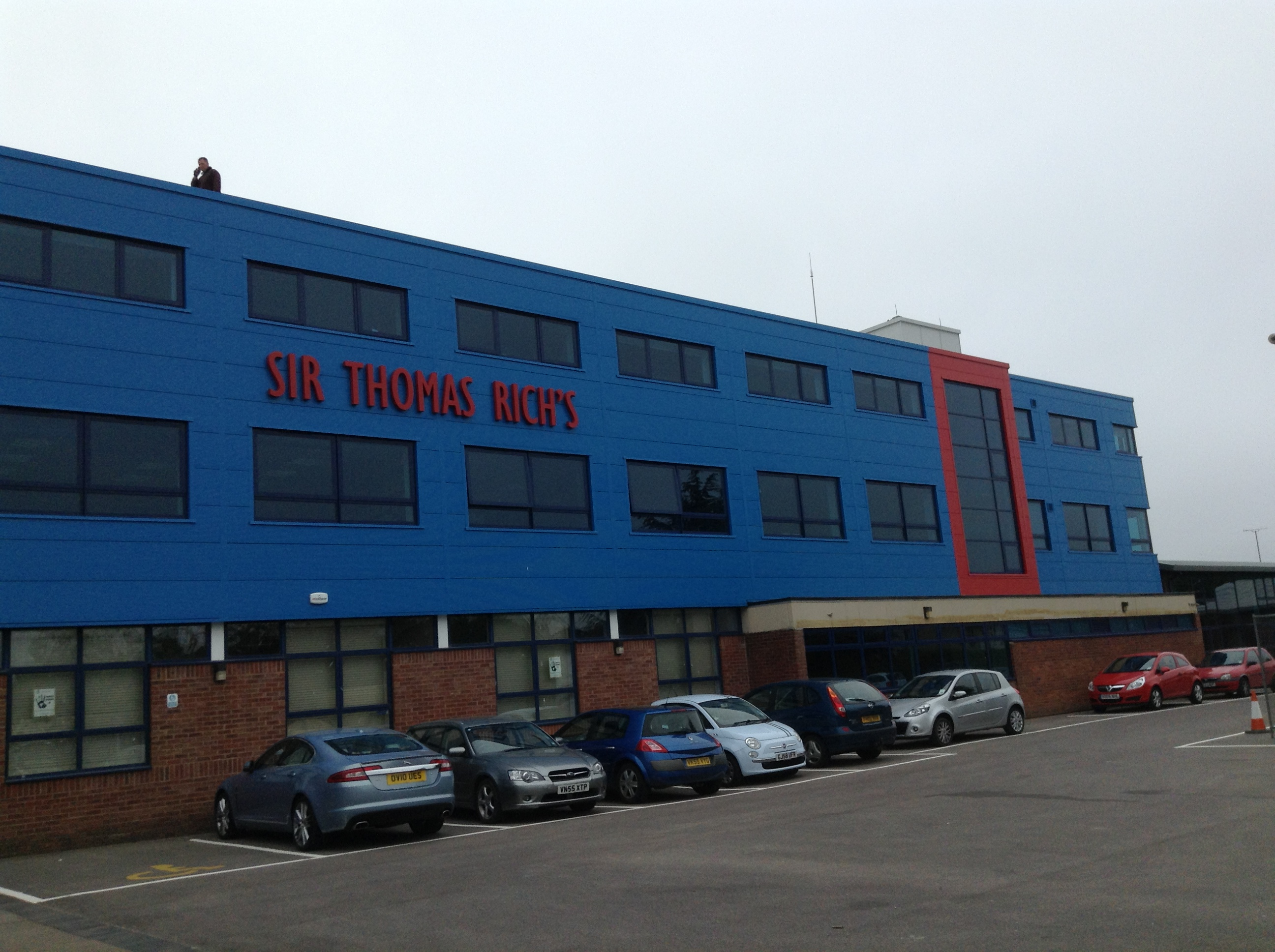
The school in June 2013

=== Growth and Expansion ===
During the late 19th century, the school saw considerable growth in student enrollment due to the rising population in the area and a greater emphasis on education. The completion of new buildings in the 1900s provided much-needed space and resources for an expanding student body. The early 20th century brought further developments, including changes in teaching methods and curriculum adjustments to reflect the needs of an industrial society.

=== Schooldays between 1910 and 1918 ===
Arthur Stanley Bullock from Longhope, who won a scholarship to Sir Thomas Rich's in about 1910, recalled his pride in starting at the school with the motto 'Garde ta foi' ('Keep your faith') on the cap badge. In his memoir, which also recalls his extraordinary experiences and narrow escapades during World War I, Arthur recorded that the headmaster at this time was called Mr E Price. Among the staff at this period, Arthur paid tribute to: 'Sherwood for arithmetic, Benfield for geography, Freeman for physics, Williams for art, West for English and history, Price for advanced English and Larcombe for mathematics.' He recalled, 'West and Larcombe stand out as absolutely brilliant'. West must have inspired Arthur's lifelong love of history - leading him to write his own historical memoir - and his excellence in mathematics - leading him to become an engineer. Larcombe was a notable author of mathematics books. Arthur also recalls that Larcombe and a number of other teachers joined up after war was declared, and four of them were killed in action.

=== Modern history ===
The school moved from the centre of Gloucester in May 1964. Changes included a new quadrangle of classrooms completed in 1994. The school has increased in size since 1990, with the addition of new buildings, such as a second quadrangle, sports hall, swimming pool, language block, music block, food technology block, a sixth form centre and a newly built pavilion. During 2013, the older sections underwent modernisation. During 2020 a new Economics, Entrepreneurship, Careers and Outreach Centre was built with a grant from the Clive and Sylvia Richard's Charity of £70,000.

In February 2020 the school was awarded the National Quality Mark For Careers Guidance.

== Facilities ==
=== Sports ===
Opened in 1999, the sports hall is part of the STRS Sports Centre complex which provides sports facilities for the school and Longlevens. The school also has a fitness suite that students are able to join for an annual fee.

== Arms ==
Coat of arms of Sir Thomas Rich's School

Notes
Granted 23 October 1962
Crest
On a wreath Or and Azure a dexter arm embowed in armour the hand gautletted Proper holding a cross formy fitchy Or the elbow enfiled of a mural crown Gold.
Escutcheon
Or on a saltire raguly per saltire Gules and Azure five cross crosslets fitchy Gold.
Motto
Garde Ta Foy

== The Tommy Psalm ==
The school song, The Tommy Psalm, is believed to be one of oldest school-based psalms, yet of uncertain authorship. A celebration of the original donation on the part of Sir Thomas Rich, it is sung at the school prize-giving ceremony on speech day.

=== Lyrics of the Tommy Psalm ===
Let us rejoice with cheerful voice, God's goodness magnify,
Who freely grants to all our wants,
Most plentiful supply.
Naked and poor to clothe and feed,
From misery to raise,
How truly great, how noble 'tis,
How worthy is the praise.

Base pleasure 'tis mankind to hurt,
Although the only joy
Of ill men who abuse their wealth,
The harmless to annoy.
Within this city, thanks to God,
Such bounteous works abound,
As have embalmed the authors' name,
By faith most richly crowned.

And in this rank of pious men,
Our founder, though the last,
In time, yet in munificence,
By none has been surpassed.
Sixteen thousand pounds of what God gave,
He did give back again,
Though having issue of his blood,
Did not poor heirs disdain.

Whenever we come, our gratitude,
Shall there make it appear,
Who 'twas at first did nourish us,
And who doth feed us here.
The pious part of this large store
In heaven's treasury lies,
Whilst the earthly stock's secured below,
In the hands of the good and wise.

And may this place and the whole realm,
In peace protected be,
And happily may our King reign,
Blessed with peace and prosperity.

== Notable former pupils ==
- Philip Giddings - political scientist
- Bill Hook - international rugby union player
- Barry Legg - MP for Milton Keynes South West
- Robert A. Pearce - Vice-Chancellor of the University of Wales
- Derek Rawcliffe - Bishop of the New Hebrides
- Ian Smith (rugby union, born 1965) - former Scotland international rugby union player
- Sam Underhill - Professional rugby union player
- James "Jemmy" Wood - Owner of the Gloucester Old Bank (Note: Jemmy Wood was educated in Sir Thomas Rich's School or The King's School, Gloucester)
- Alex Phillips - TV presenter and Brexit Party MEP for South East England
- Tom Bevan - British writer of boys' adventure stories.
- William Fream - British writer on agriculture
- Walter Clutterbuck Buckle - Canadian politician
- Derek Long - British chemist
- John By - British military engineer (Note: Nothing certain is known about By’s early education; Andrews suggests that it could have been at Sir Thomas Rich's School)
