= Colin Campbell im Thurn =

Colin Campbell im Thurn (1860 - 1941) was Dean of Glasgow and Galloway from 1921 to 1937.

He was born in 1860, educated at Merton College, Oxford;and ordained deacon in 1889, and priest in 1890. After a curacy at St Matthew Glasgow he was Priest in charge at St Mark, Glasgow then Rector of Dumfries until his appointment as Dean.

He died on 19 January 1941.

Anglican Communion titles
Preceded by Edward Thomas Scott Reid	Dean of Glasgow and Galloway; 1921–1937	Succeeded by Charles Bernard Beard
