= Thorpe Morieux =

Village in Suffolk, England

Coordinates: 52.145°N 0.836°E

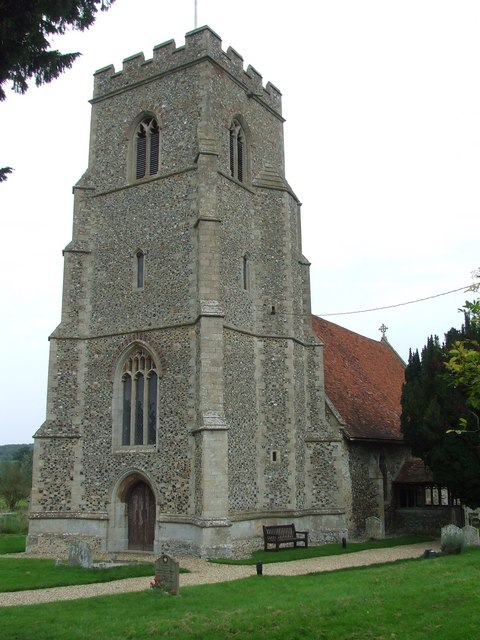
- St Mary, Thorpe Morieux

- Location within Suffolk
- Population: 232 (2011)
- District: Babergh
- Shire county: Suffolk
- Region: East
- Country: England
- Sovereign state: United Kingdom
- Post town: Bury St Edmunds
- Postcode district: IP30
- UK Parliament: South Suffolk

Thorpe Morieux (/məˈruː/ Mə-ROO) is a small village and civil parish in Suffolk, England. It is 10 miles south-east of Bury St Edmunds and 10 miles north east of Sudbury.

Located in Babergh district, the parish contains the hamlets of Thorpe Green and Almshouses Green, as well as Great Hastings Wood (part of the Thorpe Morieux Woods SSSI), which is classified as Ancient Woodland. It was anciently in the Cosford Hundred.

There are 14 listed buildings in the parish, mostly grade II with the grade II* Thorpe Hall and the grade I parish church of St Mary the Virgin.

The village is located on the river Brett.

== History ==
The Domesday Book records the population of Thorpe Morieux in 1086 to be 35 households with lands listed under two owners Roger the Poitevin and Bury St Edmunds Abbey.

In 1870–72, John Marius Wilson's Imperial Gazetteer of England and Wales described the village as:

THORPE-MORIEUX, a parish, with a village, in Cosford district, Suffolk; 3¼ miles NNE of Lavenham r. station. Post town, Bildestone, under Ipswich. Acres, 2,457. Real property, £3,570. Pop., 447. Houses, 98. The manor belongs to H. Sparrow, Esq. The living is a rectory in the diocese of Ely. Value, £656.* Patron, The Rev. T. T. Harrison. The church is good.

In 1887, John Bartholomew also wrote an entry on Thorpe Morieux in the Gazetteer of the British Isles with a much shorter description:

Thorpe Morieux, par.and vil., Suffolk, 3 miles NE. of Lavenham and 9 miles SE. of Bury St Edmunds, 2457 ac., pop. 416; P.O

== Notable residents ==
- Robert Coe (1589-1689), early English settler in New England, and magistrate.
- Tom Francis (born 1999), actor
- William Harrison (1837-1920), Bishop of Glasgow and Galloway.
- Peregrine Rhodes KCMG (1925-2005), diplomat.
- Courtenay Warner 1st Baronet, CB (1857–1934), politician.
