= Ian Barcroft =

Scottish priest

Ian Barcroft (born 1960) was Dean of Glasgow and Galloway in the Scottish Episcopal Church from 2010 to 2018.

He was born in 1960, educated at UMIST and Edinburgh Theological College;and ordained deacon in 1988, and priest in 1989. He was Precentor of St Ninian's Cathedral, Perth from 1988 to 1992; Priest in charge of St Clement, Aberdeen from 1992 to 1997; and Rector of Hamilton since then.

Anglican Communion titles
Preceded by Gregor Duthie Duncan	Dean of Glasgow and Galloway; 2010– 2018	Succeeded by Reuben Preston
