= William Wade (Dean of Glasgow and Galloway) =

William Wade was a Scottish Episcopalian priest.

Wade was born in 1784. He was the incumbent at Paisley from 1817; and Dean of Glasgow and Galloway from 1843 until his death on 4 December 1845.

Anglican Communion titles
Preceded by William Routledge	Dean of Glasgow and Galloway; 1843–1845	Succeeded by William Wilson
