= Alexander Henderson (priest) =

Scottish Episcopalian priest

Alexander Henderson (1807 - 1888) was a Scottish Episcopalian priest: he was the Dean of Glasgow and Galloway from 1859 until 1877.

Henderson was educated at King's College, Aberdeen and ordained in 1842. After a curacy in Leith he spent the rest of his career in Hamilton.

Anglican Communion titles
Preceded by William Scot Wilson	Dean of Glasgow and Galloway; 1843–1845	Succeeded by Richard Samuel Oldham
