= Philip Lempriere =

Dean of Glasgow and Galloway (1959–62)

Philip Charles Lempriere (1890 - 1949) was Dean of Glasgow and Galloway from 1959 to 1962.

He was born on 12 April 1890, educated at the University of Edinburgh;and ordained deacon in 1913, and priest in 1914. He was then a Curate at Hamilton before being appointed a Chaplain to the Forces in 1917. He was Rector of Bearsden from 1920 until 1923; St James, Glasgow, 1923–27; St Bride, Glasgow, 1927–35; Girvan, 1935–41; and Hamilton, 1941 to 1946. He was Principal of Edinburgh Theological College from 1946 to 1948 and Examining Chaplain to the Bishop of Edinburgh from 1947 until his death on 26 February 1949.

Anglican Communion titles
Preceded by Charles Bernard Beard	Glasgow and Galloway; 1943–1946	Succeeded by William Haworth
