= Eric Brereton =

Eric Hugh Brereton, OBE (1889–1962) was Dean of Glasgow and Galloway from 1959 to 1962.

He was born on 17 November 1889, educated at Durham University; and ordained deacon in 1912, and became a priest in 1913. Following curacies in Leith and at St Mary's Cathedral, Edinburgh, he was a Chaplain to the Forces from 1915 to 1919. He was then a Chaplain to the Territorial Army until 1940. He became Rector of Christ Church, Morningside from 1921 until 1927; Vice-Provost of St Mary's Cathedral, Glasgow from 1927 until 1933; and Rector of St Margaret Glasgow from 1933 until his death on 8 December 1962.

Anglican Communion titles
Preceded by William Haworth	Glasgow and Galloway; 1959–1962	Succeeded by Frederick Goldie
