= Charles Beard (priest) =

Dean of Glasgow and Galloway

Charles Bernard Beard was Dean of Glasgow and Galloway from 1937 to 1943.

He was born on 7 December 1870, educated at the University of Glasgow;and ordained deacon in 1895, and priest in 1896. After curacies in Dundee and Glasgow he was Rector of Peterhead from 1902 until 1905; and of Helensburgh from 1905 until his death on 11 February 1943.

Anglican Communion titles
Preceded by Colin Campbell im Thurn	Dean of Glasgow and Galloway; 1937–1943	Succeeded by Philip Charles Lempriere
