= Francis Moncreiff (bishop) =

Scottish Anglican bishop

The Right Reverend Francis Moncreiff
- Bishop of Glasgow and Galloway; Primus of the Scottish Episcopal Church
- Church: Scottish Episcopal Church
- Diocese: Glasgow and Galloway
- In office: 1952–1974
- Predecessor: John How
- Successor: Frederick Goldie
- Other post: Primus of the Scottish Episcopal Church (1962–1973)

Orders
- Ordination: 1931 by Leonard White-Thomson
- Consecration: 15 July 1952 by Thomas Hannay

Personal details
- Born: 29 September 1906 North Berwick, East Lothian, Scotland
- Died: 3 September 1984 (aged 77)
- Denomination: Anglican
- Parents: James Hamilton Moncreiff, Elizabeth Lilian Harvey
- Education: St John's College, Cambridge

Francis Hamilton Moncreiff (29 September 1906 – 3 September 1984) was an Anglican bishop.

== Early life and education ==
Moncreiff was born in North Berwick, East Lothian, the son of James Hamilton Moncreiff. He was educated at Shrewsbury and then St John's College, Cambridge (Bachelor of Arts, 1927; Master of Arts 1931). He trained for the ordained ministry at Ripon College Cuddesdon. He was awarded a Doctor of Divinity from the University of Glasgow in 1967.

== Ordained ministry ==
Moncreiff was ordained deacon in 1930 and priest in 1931 by the Bishop of Ely. He began his ordained ministry with curacies at St Giles' Cambridge (1930 to 1935) and then St Augustine's in Kilburn (1935 to 1941). After this he was priest in charge of St Salvador's Church in Edinburgh from 1941 to 1947 and its rector until 1951. He also served as chaplain at H.M. Prison in Edinburgh between 1942 and 1951, and was a canon of the St Mary's Cathedral chapter in Edinburgh between 1950 and 1952.

=== Bishop ===
In 1952, he was elected Bishop of Glasgow and Galloway and was consecrated on 15 July 1952 at St Mary's Cathedral, Glasgow. A decade later, he became Primus of Scotland, and he held both posts until his retirement in 1973. As a Bishop he was tall, austere and painfully shy. When visiting the Student chaplaincy he would sit in a corner holding a conversation with the Chaplain's dog. He used to give the Chief Constable a lift to the Cathedral for the 8 am Mass. The Passenger ventured a comment as they speeded through a third set of lights on Great Western Road. "Oh!" said Bishop Francis, "Do they count on Sundays?"

Anglican Communion titles
Preceded by John Charles Halland How	Bishop of Glasgow and Galloway; 1952 – 1973	Succeeded by Frederick Goldie
Preceded by Thomas Hannay	Primus of the Scottish Episcopal Church; 1962 – 1973	Succeeded by Richard Wimbush
