= William Haworth (priest) =

English peer (1880–1960)

William Haworth (1880 - 1960) was Dean of Glasgow and Galloway from 1946 to 1959.

He was born on 30 March 1880, educated at Emmanuel College, Cambridge; and ordained deacon in 1903, and priest in 1904. After curacies in Tynemouth and Elswick he was priest in charge of Bridge of Weir. He was the Rector of St George, Glasgow from 1920 until 1943; and then Largs from 1944 until 1959.

He died on 13 February 1960.

Anglican Communion titles
Preceded by Philip Charles Lempriere	Glasgow and Galloway; 1946–1959	Succeeded by Eric Hugh Brereton
