= William Wilson (bishop) =

Scottish Episcopal bishop (1806–1888)

The Right Reverend William Scot Wilson
- Bishop of Glasgow and Galloway
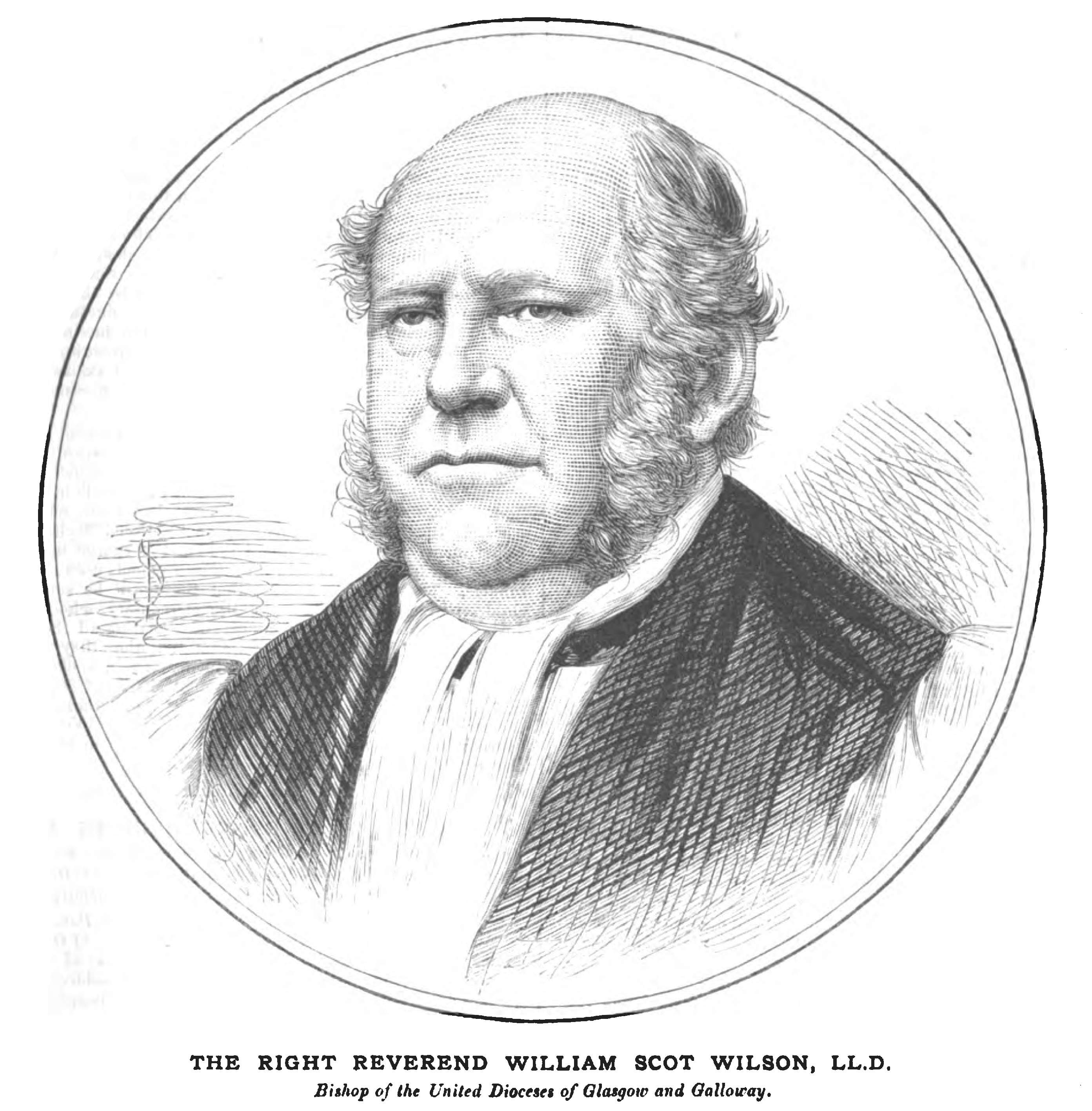
- Church: Scottish Episcopal Church
- Diocese: Glasgow and Galloway
- In office: 1859–1888
- Predecessor: Walter Trower
- Successor: William Harrison

Orders
- Ordination: 1829 by David Low
- Consecration: 26 April 1859 by Charles Terrot

Personal details
- Born: 1806 Pittenweem, Fife, Scotland
- Died: 17 March 1888 (aged 81–82) Ayr, Ayrshire, Scotland
- Denomination: Anglican
- Spouse: Jane Austin (m. 1843)

William Scot Wilson (1806 – 17 March 1888) was a Scottish bishop of the Scottish Episcopal Church, who served as Bishop of Glasgow and Galloway between 1859 and 1888.

== Life and ministry ==
Wilson was born in Pittenweem, Fife in 1806, the son of the Reverend David Wilson. He was educated at King's College, Aberdeen, from where he graduated with a Master of Arts] in 1827. He also gained his theological training from Edinburgh Theological College. He was awarded a Doctor of Laws from Trinity College Dublin in 1859, and a Doctor of Divinity from Hobart College.

He was ordained deacon in 1827 and priest in 1829 by Bishop David Low of Ross and Argyle. He then ministered in Inverness-shire. In 1832 he was appointed rector of Holy Trinity Church in Ayr, a post he retained during his episcopacy, till his death He also became Dean of Glasgow and Galloway in 1845. In 1859, he was elected Bishop of Glasgow and Galloway, and remained so till his death in Ayr in 1888.) He was consecrated in St Paul's Church in Edinburgh, by the Primus Charles Terrot, on April 26, 1859.

Anglican Communion titles
Preceded by William Wade	Dean of Glasgow and Galloway; 1845–1859	Succeeded by Alexander Henderson
Preceded by Walter Trower	Bishop of Glasgow and Galloway; 1859–1888	Succeeded by William Harrison
