= Michael Tavoa =

Bishop of Vanuatu

Michael Henry Tavoa was the third Bishop of Vanuatu, one of the nine dioceses that make up the Anglican Church of Melanesia.
