= Michael Hutchison (priest) =

Scottish dean (1844–1921)

The Very Reverend Michael Hutchison
- Church: Scottish Episcopal Church
- Diocese: Glasgow and Galloway
- In office: 1903-1920

Personal details
- Born: 18 July 1844 Glasgow, Scotland
- Died: 1921
- Education: University of Oxford

Michael Balfour Hutchison (18 July 1844 – 1921) was Dean of Glasgow and Galloway from 1903 to 1920.

He was born on 18 July 1844, educated at the Glasgow High School, the University of Glasgow, Worcester College, Oxford and Lincoln College, Oxford, ordained deacon in 1868, and priest in 1869, and was awarded the degree of Doctor of Divinity in 1905. After curacies in Norwich and Paisley, he was curate in charge at St Ninian, Glasgow, then its incumbent until 1920. He died in 1921.

In 1888 he published Hymnos Quosdam Hodiernos in ordine Temporum Ecclesiasticorum Dispositos Vetus ad Exemplar Reddidit M.B. Hutchison, a volume of translations of hymns into Latin verse.

Anglican Communion titles
Preceded by Watson Reid	Dean of Glasgow and Galloway; 1903–1920	Succeeded by Edward Thomas Scott Reid
