= Samuel Horsley =

British bishop (1733–1806)

The Right Reverend Samuel Horsley
- Bishop of St Asaph
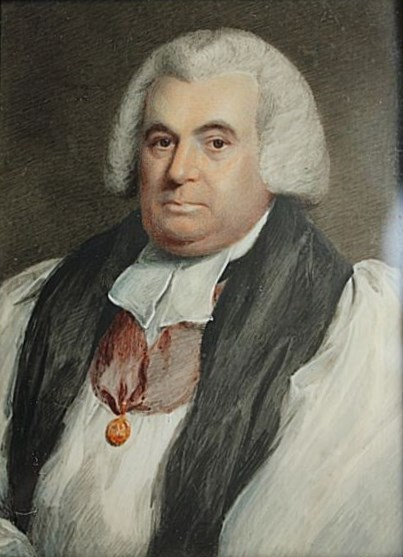
- Church: Church of England
- Diocese: Diocese of St Asaph
- Elected: 1802
- Predecessor: Lewis Bagot
- Successor: William Cleaver
- Other posts: Bishop of Rochester; 1793–1802; Dean of Westminster; 1793–1802; Bishop of St David's; 1788–1793

Personal details
- Born: 15 September 1733 London
- Died: 4 October 1806 (aged 73) Brighton
- Denomination: Anglican
- Profession: Scholar
- Education: Trinity Hall, Cambridge

Samuel Horsley (15 September 1733 – 4 October 1806) was a British churchman, bishop of Rochester from 1793. He was also well versed in physics and mathematics, on which he wrote a number of papers and thus was elected a Fellow of the Royal Society in 1767; and secretary in 1773, but, in consequence of a difference with the president (Sir Joseph Banks) he withdrew in 1784.

== Life ==
He was the son of Rev John Horsley of Newington Butts and his first wife Anne Hamilton, daughter of Rev Prof William Hamilton of Edinburgh and Mary Robertson.

Entering Trinity Hall, Cambridge in 1751, he became LL.B. in 1758 without graduating in arts. In the following year he succeeded his father in the living of Newington Butts in Surrey. In 1768 he attended the son and heir of the 3rd Earl of Aylesford to Oxford as private tutor; and, after receiving through the earl and Bishop of London various minor preferments, which by dispensations he combined with his first living, he was installed in 1781 as archdeacon of St Albans.

Horsley now entered his controversy with Joseph Priestley, who denied that the early Christians held the doctrine of the Trinity. In this fierce debate, Horsley's aim was to lessen the influence which Priestley's name gave to his views, by pointing to (what he claimed were) inaccuracies in his scholarship. Horsley was rewarded by Lord Chancellor Thurlow with a prebendal stall at Gloucester; and in 1788 Thurlow procured his promotion to the see of St David's.

As a bishop, Horsley was active both in his diocese, and in parliament. The effective support which he afforded the government was acknowledged by his successive translations to Rochester in 1793, and to St Asaph in 1802. With the see of Rochester he held the deanery of Westminster.

== Family ==
He married firstly Mary Botham (died 1777), daughter of John Botham, Rector of Albury, Hertfordshire, and secondly Sarah Wright, who died in 1805. Sarah had been a servant of his first wife, but her elegant manners impressed Queen Charlotte when she was presented at Court. By Mary, he had one surviving son, the Rev Heneage Horsley, and a daughter who died young.

He died at Brighton in 1806, and was buried in St Mary's Church, Newington Butts. He died heavily in debt, due largely it was said to his generous and charitable nature.

His granddaughter Harriet Horsley married Robert Jebb QC and had numerous distinguished descendants, including Richard Claverhouse Jebb.

== Works ==
Besides the controversial Tracts, which appeared in 1783–1785, 1786, and were republished in 1789 and 1812, Horsley's more important works are:

- Apollonii Pergaei inclinationum libri duo (1770)
- Remarks on the Observations ... for determining the acceleration of the Pendulum in Lat. 7o 51' (1774)
- Isaaci Newtoni Opera quae extant Omnia, with a commentary (5 vols 4to, 1779–1785)
- On the Incarnation. A Sermon, Preached in the Parish Church of St. Mary Newington, in Surrey, Dec. 25, 1785
- A Sermon Preached in the Cathedral Church of St. Paul (1789)
- A Review of the Case of the Protestant Dissenters with Reference to the Corporation and Test Acts (1790)
- A Sermon Preached Before the Incorporated Society for the Propagation of the Gospel in Foreign Parts (1795)
- On the Prosodies of tke Greek and Latin Languages (1796)
- Disquisitions on Isaiah xviii. (1796)
- Hosea, translated ... with Notes (1801)
- Elementary Treatises on ... Mathematics (1801)
- Euclidis elernentorum libri priores XII. (1802)
- Euclidis datorum liber (1803)
- Virgil's Two Seasons of Honey, &c. (1805)
- papers in the Philosophical Transactions from 1767 to 1776

After his death there appeared several collections edited by Heneage Horsley:

- (1810–1812)
- Speeches in Parliament (1813)
- Book of Psalms, translated with Notes (1815)
- The watchers and the holy ones, a sermon, Volume 17 (1816)
- Biblical Criticism (1820)
- Sermons. Nine sermons on our Lord's resurrection, and A dissertation on the prophecies of the Messiah dispersed among the heathen (1829)
- Collected Theological Works (6 vols 8vo, 1845).

Church of England titles
Preceded by Edward Smallwell	Bishop of St David's; 1788–1793	Succeeded by William Stuart
Preceded by John Thomas	Bishop of Rochester; 1793–1802	Succeeded by Thomas Dampier
Preceded by John Thomas	Dean of Westminster; 1793–1802	Succeeded by William Vincent
Preceded by Lewis Bagot	Bishop of St Asaph; 1802–1806	Succeeded by William Cleaver
