= Tom Bevan (writer) =

British writer (1868–1937)

Tom Bevan (1868 – 9 November 1937), who also wrote under the pseudonym Walter Bamfylde, was a British writer of boys' adventure stories. Originally a schoolteacher, he also wrote non-fiction books for children.

== Life ==
Born in Risca, Monmouthshire, Bevan's family moved to Gloucester and he was educated at Sir Thomas Rich's School, Gloucester, and St Paul's College, Cheltenham, a teacher training college that awarded Bristol University qualifications.

Bevan began writing historical adventure stories while working as a schoolmaster. In the 1920s he was education editor for Sampson Low and Marston. He contributed to several boys' magazines, including Everybody's Story Magazine and Boy's Own Paper.

Bevan also wrote non-fiction books for children. His Stories from British History: B. C. 54 – A. D. 1485 discusses, for example, the degree to which Shakespeare's History Plays present historical truth.

He died in Cheltenham on 9 November 1937.

== Works ==
=== Books ===
- (With E. Harcourt Burrage and John A. Higginson) White Ivory and Black: a tale of the Zambesi Basin: and other stories, London: S. W. Partridge & Co., 1899
- The Thane of the Dean: a tale of the time of the Conqueror, London: S. W. Partridge & Co., 1899. With four illustrations by Lancelot Speed
- Dick Dale, the Colonial Scout: a tale of the Transvaal War of 1899–1900, London: S. W. Partridge & Co., 1900. with eight illustrations by Harold Piffard
- A Lion of Wessex, or, How Saxon fought Dane, London: S. W. Partridge & Co., [1902]. With eight illustrations by Lancelot Speed
- Against the King, London; Glasgow: W. Collins, Sons & Co. [1903]
- Red Dickon the Outlaw : A story of mediaeval England, London: Nelson, 1904
- The War-God and the Brown Maiden, London: Collins [1904]. With eight illustrations by Warwick Goble
- A Hero in Wolf-Skin : a story of pagan and Christian, London: Religious Tract Society, 1904. With illustrations by J. Finnemore
- Beggars of the Sea. A story of the Dutch struggle with Spain, London: Thomas Nelson and Sons [1904?]
- A Trooper of the Finns. A tale of the Thirty Years' War, London: Religious Tract Society, 1905
- The Fen Robbers, London: T. Nelson & Sons, 1906
- Held by Rebels, London, 1906. Illustrated by Percy Tarrant
- Beggars of the Sea: A Story of the Dutch struggle with Spain, London, 1906
- Sea-Dogs All! A tale of forest and sea, London, 1907
- The Goldsmith of Chepe: A Tale of The Plague Year, London: The Religious Tract Society, 1908. With illustrations by J. Jellicoe. (Serialised in the Boys Own Paper, 1907)
- Runners of Contraband: a story of Russian Tyranny, London, 1908. With illustrations by Wal Paget
- The "Grey Fox" of Holland: a tale of adventure during the insurrection against Philip II, London/New York: T. Nelson & Sons, 1908
- The Chancellor's Spy. A vivid picture of life in the reign of Henry the Eighth, London: T. Nelson & Sons, 1909
- The Insurgent Trail: A story of the Balkans, London: Sir I. Pitman & Sons, 1910
- The Secret Men, London: S. W. Partridge & Co., 1910. With six illustrations by Ernest Prater.
- Stories from British history (B. C. 54 – A. D. 1485), 1910
- The House Of Hanover, 1714 to 1901, 1911
- Rebels And Rogues, 1911
- Out With The Buccaneers; or, The Treasure of The Snake, London: S. W. Partridge & Co., 1911
- Trapped In Tripoli; or, A Boy's Adventures in The Desert, London: S. W. Partridge & Co., 1912
- One of the Awkward Squad, London: James Nisbet & Co, 1912
- The Baymouth Scouts: A Story of The Napoleon Scare, London: The Religious Tract Society, 1913
- With Bandit And Turk, London: S. W. Partridge & Co., 1913
- The Uplanders, London: Sampson Low, Marston & Co., 1914 (as Walter Bamfylde)
- Midsummer Magic, 1915 (as Walter Bamfylde)
- With Haig At The Front: A Story Of The Great Fight, London: Collins Clear-type Press, 1916
- With Cossack And Car In Galicia, London: Collins Clear-type Press, 1917
- The Last Of The Giants: A Story Of Arctic Canada, London: Thomas Nelson and Sons, 1920
- Doing His Bit: A Story of the Great War, London: Thomas Nelson and Sons, 1920
- Bob Blair, Plainsman, London: Sampson Low, Marston & Co., 1924
- The Heroic Impostor, London: Sampson Low, Marston & Co., 1925
- The Secret of the Downs, London: Collins Clear-Type Press, 1927

=== Stories ===
- "Young Asa - A Scouting Story", Oxford Annual For Scouts, [1920s?]
