= Russell Darbyshire =

English Anglican bishop (1880–1948)

The Most Reverend John Russell Darbyshire
- Archbishop of Cape Town
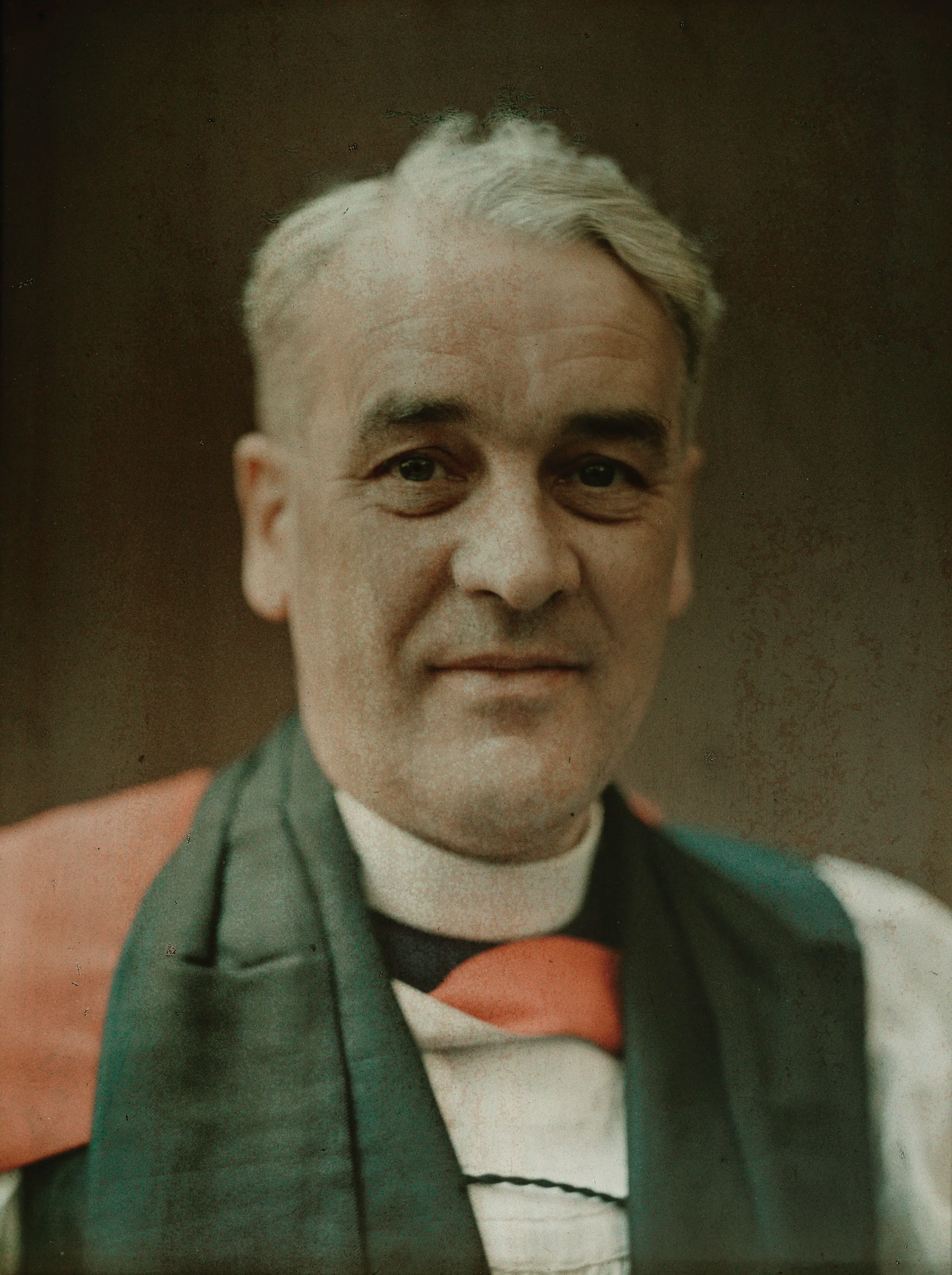
- Portrait by Olive Edis, c. 1920–1930
- Church: Scottish Episcopal Church
- Diocese: Cape Town
- Elected: 1938
- In office: 1938-1948
- Predecessor: Francis Phelps
- Successor: Geoffrey Clayton
- Previous post: Bishop of Glasgow and Galloway (1931-1938)

Orders
- Ordination: 1905
- Consecration: 30 April 1931 by Walter Robberds

Personal details
- Born: 12 October 1888 Birkenhead, Cheshire, England
- Died: 30 June 1948 (aged 59) London, England
- Denomination: Anglican
- Parents: Edward & Matilda Darbyshire
- Education: Emmanuel College, Cambridge

John Russell Darbyshire (12 October 1880 – 30 June 1948) was an Anglican bishop.

== Life and ministry ==
He was born in Birkenhead in Cheshire in 1880, the son of Edward and Matilda Darbyshire, and educated at Dulwich College and Emmanuel College, Cambridge. Ordained deacon in 1904 and priest in 1905, his first post was as a Curate at St Andrew the Less, Cambridge after which he was Vice-Principal of Ridley Hall, Cambridge. Later he was Vicar of St Luke, Liverpool then a Canon Residentiary at Manchester Cathedral. From 1922 to 1931 he was Archdeacon of Sheffield, his last post before his ordination to the episcopate as Bishop of Glasgow and Galloway, a post he held until 1938. In that year he was appointed Archbishop of Cape Town.

He was created a sub-prelate of the Order of St John of Jerusalem in 1938.

He visited England to attend the Lambeth Conference in 1948, and died in London on 30 June 1948. He never married.

A set of iron gates were erected in his memory at St. George's Cathedral, Cape Town.

== Bibliography ==
- The Christian Faith and some Alternatives (1921)
- Our Treasury of Prayer and Praise (1926)
- Jesus, the Messiah in the Gospels (1933)

== Notes ==
Church of England titles
Preceded by Charles Lisle Carr	Archdeacon of Sheffield; 1922–1931	Succeeded by Alfred Charles Eustace Jarvis
Scottish Episcopal Church titles
Preceded by Edward Thomas Scott Reid	Bishop of Glasgow and Galloway; 1931 – 1938	Succeeded by John Charles Halland How
Anglican Church of Southern Africa titles
Preceded by Francis Robinson Phelps	Anglican Archbishop of Cape Town; 1938 – 1948	Succeeded by Geoffrey Hare Clayton
