= Bill Hook (rugby union) =

England international rugby union player

- Full name: William Gordon Hook
- Born: 21 December 1920 Gloucester, England
- Died: 9 May 2013 (aged 92)
- School: Sir Thomas Rich's School

Rugby union career
- Position: Fullback
International career
Years	Team	Apps	(Points)
1951–52	England	3	(2)

William Gordon Hook (21 December 1920 – 9 May 2013) was an English international rugby union player.

A native of Gloucester, Hook was educated at Sir Thomas Rich's School and spent his entire rugby career with his hometown club, debuting for Gloucester RFC as a 17-year old in 1938.

Hook served with the RAF during the war and for part of the conflict was stationed in west Africa.

After the war, Hook began earning representative honours, with regular appearances for Gloucestershire. He was capped three times by England as a fullback, kicking the winning conversion in his debut match against Scotland in 1951. The following year, Hook appeared twice for England, including against the Springboks at Twickenham.

Hook was a sports outfitter by profession and had a shop on Westgate Street in Gloucester.

== See also ==
- List of England national rugby union players
