= William Routledge (priest) =

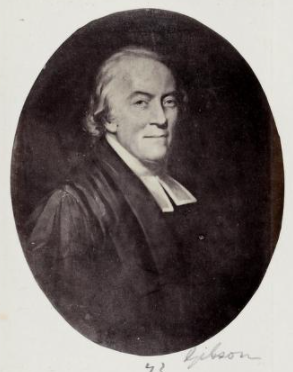
Rev William Routledge

William Routledge (1770–1843) was a Scottish Episcopalian priest.

== Life ==
He was born at Calder Bridge around 1770 the son of William Routledge and his wife, Mary Hudspith. Routledge was ordained in 1794. He was a Curate at St Andrew's Qualified Chapel from 1795 until 1805; and then the incumbent at St Andrew, Glasgow. He was also the inaugural Dean of Glasgow and Galloway until his death.

He died at home 15 Cambridge Street in Glasgow on 21 August 1843.

== Family ==
He married Jane Gibson daughter of Henry Gibson.

== Artistic recognition ==
He was portrayed by John D. Gibson.

Anglican Communion titles
Preceded by Inaugural appointment	Dean of Glasgow and Galloway; 1837–1843	Succeeded by William Wade
