= All Saints Church, Lockerbie =

Coordinates: 55.123135°N 3.359920°W

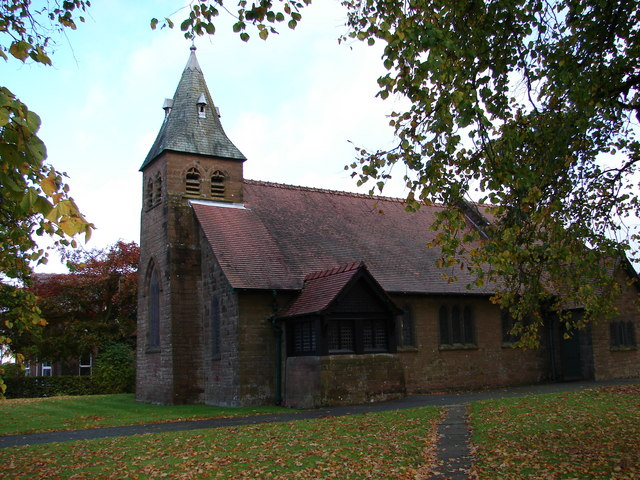
- All Saints Church, Lockerbie, from the southwest
- All Saints Church, Lockerbie
- Location: Ashgrove Terrace, Lockerbie, Dumfries and Galloway
- Country: Scotland
- Denomination: Scottish Episcopal Church

History
- Status: Parish church
- Dedication: All Saints
- Dedicated: 18 April 1903
- Consecrated: 1 November 1909

Architecture
- Functional status: Active
- Heritage designation: Category B
- Designated: 4 October 1988
- Architect: Douglas and Minshull
- Architectural type: Church
- Style: Gothic Revival
- Groundbreaking: 21 September 1901
- Completed: 1903

Specifications
- Materials: Ashlar stone with red tile roof Spire with Westmorland slate

Administration
- Diocese: Glasgow and Galloway

All Saints Church is in Ashgrove Terrace, Lockerbie, Dumfries and Galloway, Scotland. It is a Category B listed building and an active Scottish Episcopal Church in the Diocese of Glasgow and Galloway.

== History ==
The church was built in 1903 and designed by Douglas and Minshull, a firm of architects from Chester, Cheshire, England.

== Architecture ==
All Saints Church is built in ashlar stone with a red tile roof. Its plan consists of a low nave with aisles, a higher chancel with a canted end, a south porch and a tower at the west end. The tower has a broach spire with Westmorland slates. The stained glass includes a memorial window by Morris & Co.

== See also ==
- List of new churches by John Douglas
