= Robert Thom (priest) =

Robert Kilgour Thom was Dean of Brechin from 1861 until 1874; he was also the incumbent of Drumlithie.

== Notes ==
Scottish Episcopal Church titles
Preceded by John Moir	Dean of Brechin; 1861–1874	Succeeded by James Nicolson
