= John How (bishop) =

English Anglican bishop

The Right Reverend John How OGS
- Bishop of Glasgow and Galloway; Primus of the Scottish Episcopal Church
- Church: Scottish Episcopal Church
- Diocese: Glasgow and Galloway
- In office: 1938-1952
- Predecessor: Russell Darbyshire
- Successor: Francis Moncreiff
- Other post: Primus of the Scottish Episcopal Church (1946-1952)

Orders
- Ordination: 1906 by Edward Talbot
- Consecration: 16 November 1938 by Arthur Maclean

Personal details
- Born: 16 September 1881 Forest Hill, Kent, England
- Died: 22 May 1961 (aged 79)
- Denomination: Anglican
- Parents: Charles How, Elizabeth Halland
- Spouse: Junie Katherine Reynolds (m. 1925; died 1938) Barbara Collcutt (m. 1939)
- Children: 2

John Charles Halland How OGS (16 September 1881 – 22 May 1961) was an Anglican bishop.

== Family and education ==
Born to Charles How, a draper, and Elizabeth Halland, he was educated at Pocklington School and St John's College, Cambridge.

How was married twice: first in 1925 to Junie Katherine Reynolds (who died in 1938), and second in 1939 to Barbara Collcutt. His son by his first marriage was the organist and composer Martin How.

== Career ==
How was ordained in 1906 and began his career at the Wellington College Mission, Walworth. From 1906 he was Lecturer in Hebrew at St John's College. He was a Temporary Chaplain to the Forces from 1915 to 1919, eventually serving in Egypt. He was regarded as 'manly' and popular, and a good preacher and lecturer. He could speak French and Arabic.

In 1920 he became warden of the OGS Oratory House, Cambridge. Following this he became an honorary canon of Liverpool Cathedral in 1922 and in 1924 became the missioner in the Diocese of Manchester. In 1926, he became rector of St Nicholas' Church in Liverpool. Simultaneously he also became Rural Dean of Liverpool in 1930. He resigned both posts to become vicar of West Blatchington, Sussex in 1935. How served as an Honorary Chaplain to the King from 1933 to 1938 and as a canon of Chichester Cathedral.

How was elected Bishop of Glasgow and Galloway in 1938. Eight years later, on 18 June 1946, he became Primus of Scotland, a post he held until his retirement in 1952.

How died on 22 May 1961.

Anglican Communion titles
Preceded by John Russell Darbyshire	Bishop of Glasgow and Galloway; 1938 – 1952	Succeeded by Francis Hamilton Moncreiff
Preceded by Ernest Denny Logie Danson	Primus of the Scottish Episcopal Church; 1946 – 1952	Succeeded by Thomas Hannay
