= St Ninian's, Pollokshields, Glasgow =

St Ninian's Church
- The Parish Church of Saint Ninian
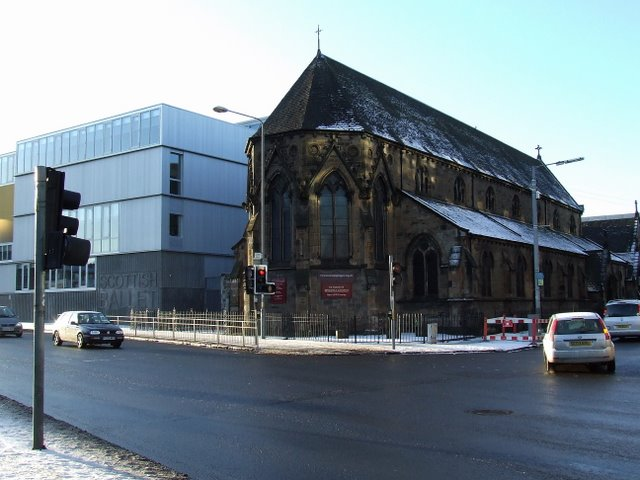
- St Ninian's Church
- 55°50′27″N 4°15′57″W
- Location: Glasgow
- Country: Scotland
- Denomination: Scottish Episcopal Church
- Churchmanship: Liberal Catholic
- Website: Church Website

History
- Status: Active
- Dedication: Saint Ninian
- Consecrated: 1877

Architecture
- Functional status: Parish church
- Architect: David Thomson
- Architectural type: Church
- Style: Neo-Gothic
- Groundbreaking: 1872
- Completed: 1977

Administration
- Diocese: Glasgow and Galloway

Clergy
- Bishop: Nicholas Bundock
- Rector: Verity Brown

Listed Building – Category B
- Designated: 22 August 1984
- Reference no.: LB33454

St Ninian's Church is a Parish church of the Scottish Episcopal Church located in the Pollokshields area of Glasgow, Scotland.

== History ==
The church was built on lands given by Sir John Maxwell, with the foundation stone being laid in 1872.

The church was designed by David Thomson, who laid out plans to build the church in the Neo-Gothic style. Building was completed in 1877, with an extension built in the west side in 1887.

A sacristy was also built in 1914, on designs of H. D. Wilson, who was a member of the congregation.

== Works of art ==
The chancel is decorated with murals painted by William Hole in 1901. The murals were restored in 2003.

A number of stained glass windows also adorn the church, some of which are the work of Heaton, Butler and Bayne. A notable example of Heaton, Butler and Bayne's work is the West Window, installed in 1888, which depicts scenes from the life and work of St Ninian. The windows were installed in different periods between 1877 and 1922.

The windows in the chancel represent The Gospel Story and are the work of Stephen Adam.
