= Heneage Horsley =

Heneage Horsley (23 February 1776 – 6 October 1847) was Dean of Brechin from 1812 until his death.

He was the 3rd son of Samuel Horsley, Bishop of St Asaph, and his first wife Mary Botham. He died on 6 October 1847. He had at least one daughter Harriet, who married Robert Jebb QC and had two distinguished children, Sir Richard Claverhouse Jebb and Eglantyne Louisa Jebb.

Mary Eglantyne Horsley, whose portrait is in the National Gallery of Ireland, may also have been a daughter of Heneage (Eglantyne was a common girl's name in later generations of the Jebb family).

== Notes ==
Scottish Episcopal Church titles
Preceded by James Somerville	Dean of Brechin; 1812–1847	Succeeded by John Moir
