= Michael Hutchinson =

Michael Hutchinson may refer to:

- Michael Hutchinson (cyclist) (born 1973), British racing cyclist and writer
- Michael Hutchinson (ice hockey) (born 1990), Canadian ice hockey goaltender
- Michael Hutchinson (politician), Belizean politician

== See also ==
- Michael Hutchinson Jenks (1795–1867), member of the U.S. House of Representatives from Pennsylvania
