= Nicholas Bundock =

Scottish Episcopal bishop (born 1973)

The Right Reverend Nicholas Bundock
- Bishop of Glasgow and Galloway
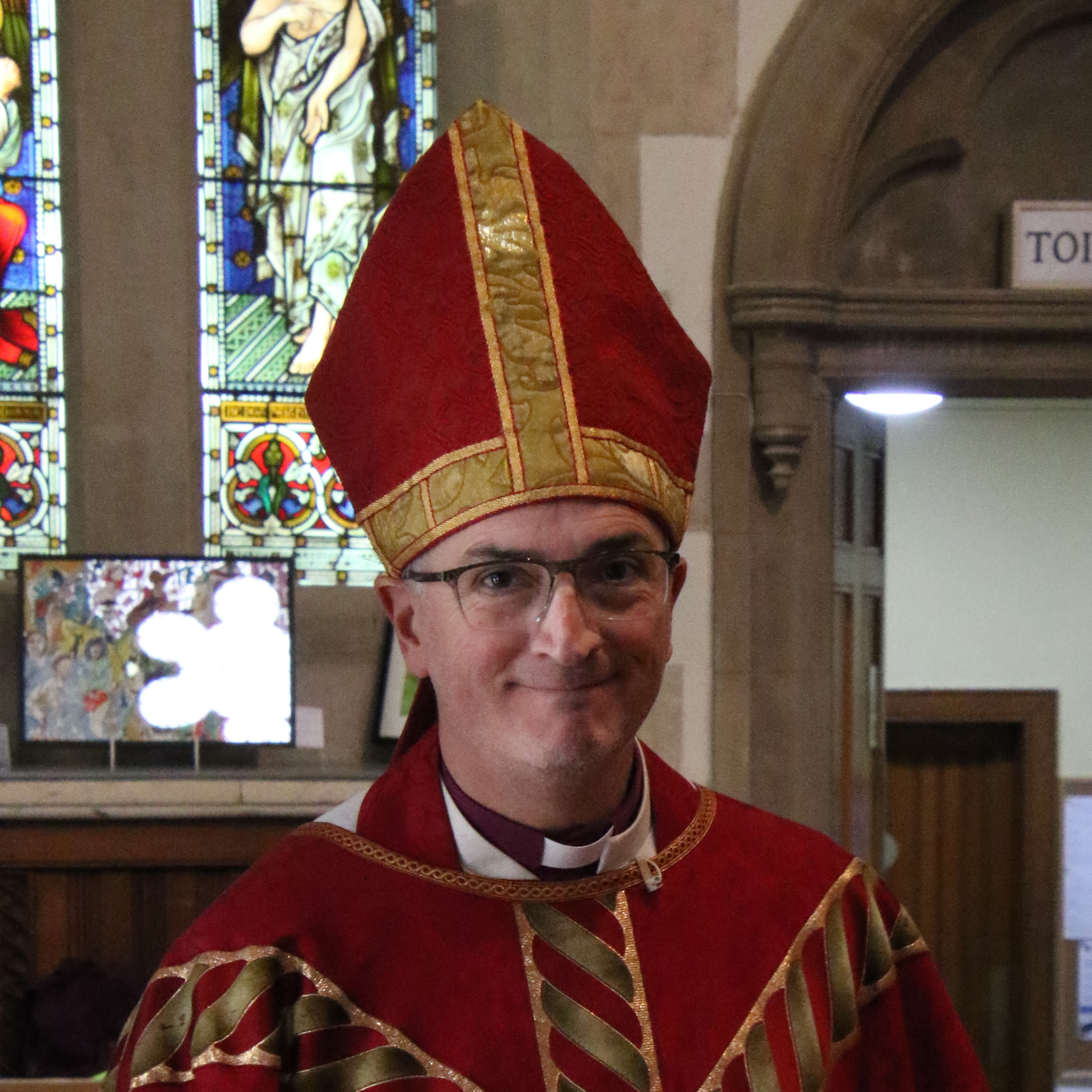
- Church: Scottish Episcopal Church
- Diocese: Glasgow and Galloway
- In office: 2025–present
- Predecessor: Kevin Pearson

Orders
- Ordination: 2002 (diaconate); 2003 (priesthood)
- Consecration: 3 May 2025 by Mark Strange

Personal details
- Born: April 1973 (age 53)
- Spouse: Rachel Bundock
- Children: 2
- Education: University of North Texas; University of Sheffield; Ridley Hall, Cambridge

Nicholas John Bundock (born April 1973) is an English-born Anglican bishop in the Scottish Episcopal Church. Since 2025, he has been Bishop of Glasgow and Galloway.

== Biography ==
Bundock was born in 1973. Bundock studied molecular biology and biochemistry at the University of North Texas, obtaining a doctorate from the University of Sheffield before training for ministry at Ridley Hall, Cambridge.

He spent 20 years as team rector of the Church of St James, Didsbury, and led a ministry called "Church for Everyone". In January 2025, he was elected bishop of Glasgow and Galloway, and he was consecrated on 3 May 2025 at St Mary's Cathedral.

== Bibliography ==
- Bundock, Nicholas (2021). "A Long Obedience in the Wrong Direction". In Reddish, Tim; Rambob, Bonnie; Stedman, Fran; Oord, Thomas Jay (eds.). Partnering with God: Exploring Collaboration in Open and Relational Theology. SacraSage. pp. 249–253. ISBN 978-1948609401.

Anglican Communion titles
Preceded by Kevin Pearson	Bishop of Glasgow and Galloway; Since 2025	Incumbent
