= Harry Tevi =

Harry Sivehi Tevi (died 14 May 2012) was the second Anglican Bishop of Vanuatu

He trained for the priesthood at St Peter's College, Siota and was ordained in 1969. He was a Lecturer at the Bishop Patteson Theological College in Honiara. He was consecrated a bishop in February 1979, to serve as an Assistant Bishop of the New Hebrides; he was then elected diocesan Bishop of the New Hebrides on 1 February 1980 and installed the next day. The diocese's name was changed to Vanuatu that year, around the time of Vanuatu independence.
