= Hugh Blessing-Boe =

Bishop of Vanuatu

Hugh Blessing-Boe (died 16 January 2018) was the fourth Bishop of Vanuatu, one of the nine dioceses that make up the Anglican Church of Melanesia.

He comes from the island of Maewo in Vanuatu. His father Walter Boesel is from Navenvene village in Central Maewo and his mother Elenor Boesel is from Talise village also in Central Maewo and she is partly of European descent.

He was Principal of the Bishop Patteson Theological College from 1986 to 1995; He was consecrated bishop on 29 June 2000 and served as Bishop of Vanuatu until his retirement in June 2006. He had degrees from the Universities of Birmingham and Auckland.
