= Barton Street, Gloucester =

Street in Gloucester, England

Coordinates: 51°51′20″N 2°14′15″W

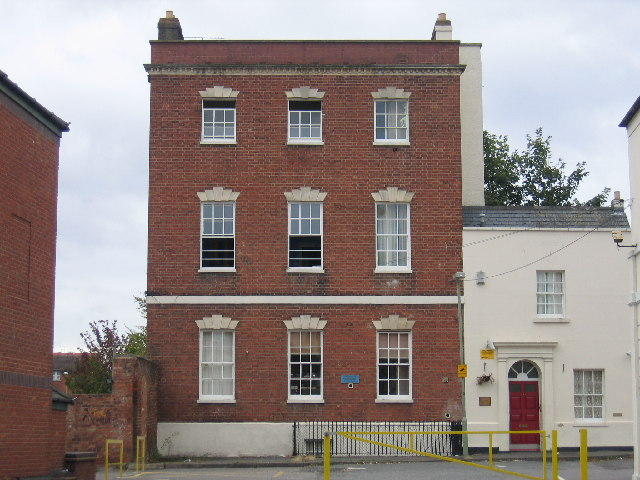
Richleigh, Barton Street, The former site of Sir Thomas Rich's School

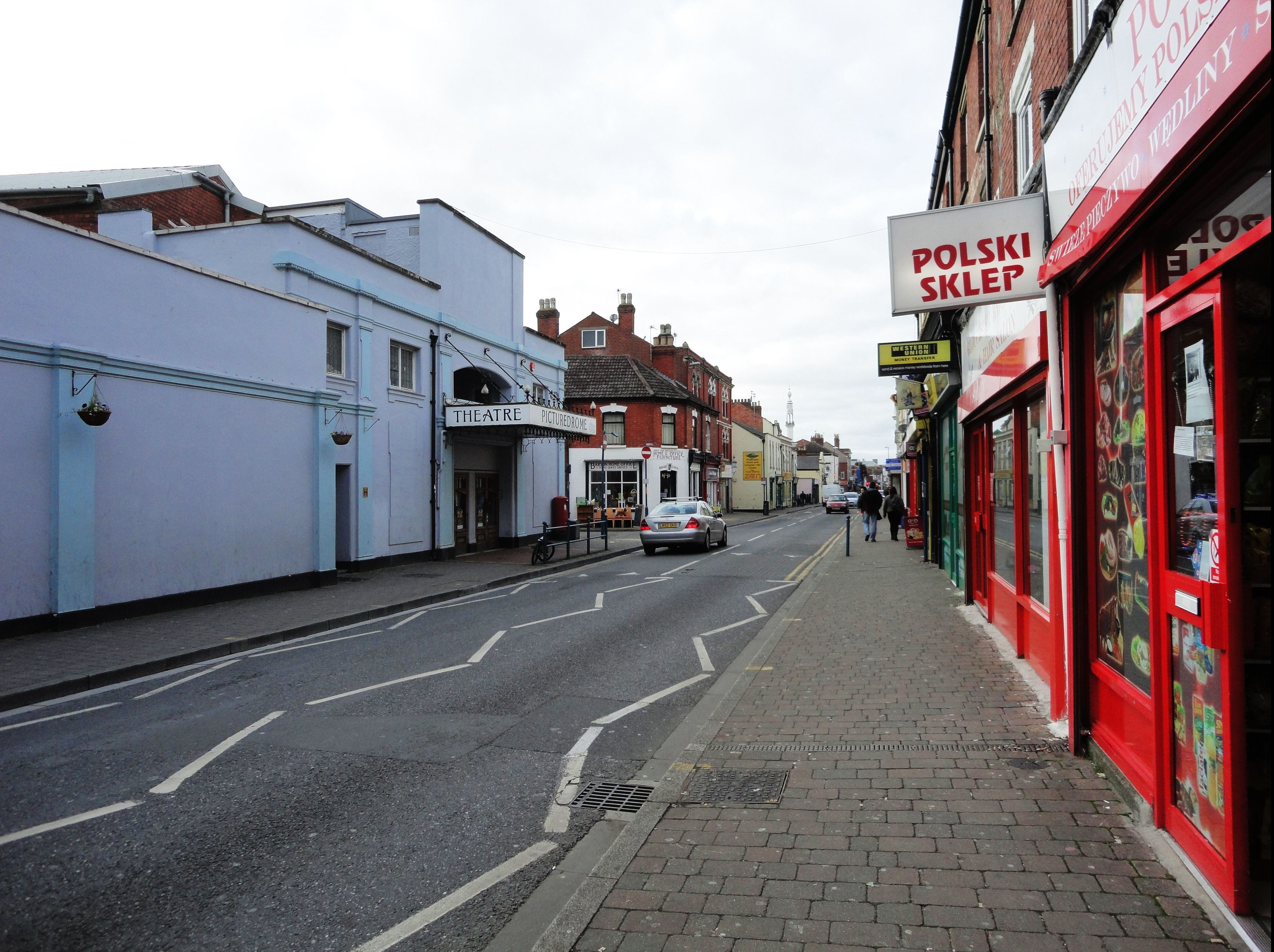
The Picturedome

Barton Street is a street in the Barton and Tredworth district of Gloucester that is the location of a number of listed buildings:

- Church of all Saints
- 110 and 112 Barton Street
- The Olympus Theatre
- The Vauxhall Inn

Barton Street elects a mock mayor.
