= Diocese of Vanuatu and New Caledonia =

Coordinates: 15°32′S 167°10′E

The Diocese of Vanuatu and New Caledonia is one of the ten dioceses within the Anglican Church of Melanesia.

Originally established as the Diocese of the New Hebrides in 1975, it was inaugurated the same year at Lolowai on Aoba Island. The diocese was renamed the Diocese of Vanuatu c. 1980 following the Republic of Vanuatu's independence, and around 2010, it adopted its current name to include New Caledonia.

The diocese is organized into eight regions and 39 parishes, with its headquarters in Luganville.

== List of bishops ==
Bishops of the New Hebrides
From	Until	Incumbent	Notes
1975	1980	Derek Rawcliffe	Previously assistant bishop in the Diocese of Melanesia since 1974.
1980	1980	Harry Tevi	Previously Assistant Bishop of the New Hebrides since 1979.
Bishops of Vanuatu
1980	1989	Harry Tevi	Title changed with Vanuatu independence
1990	2000	Michael Tavoa	Consecrated and installed on 21 April 1990.
2000	2006	Hugh Blessing-Boe	Consecrated and installed on 29 June 2000.
2006	?	James Ligo	Fifth bishop
Bishops of Vanuatu and New Caledonia
?	2017	James Ligo	Title changed to Bishop of Vanuatu and New Caledonia.
2017	present	James Tama	

== Sources ==
- Anglican Church of Melanesia — Diocese of Vanuatu and New Caledonia
