= James Tama =

Vanuatuan-New Caledonian bishop

James Tama has been the Anglican Bishop of Vanuatu and New Caledonia, one of the nine dioceses that make up the Anglican Church of Melanesia, since 2018.

Tama was born on Ambae Island and educated at the Pacific Theological College, Fiji. His posts have included being Deputy Principal of the Bishop Patteson Theological College, Principal of the Fisher Young School of Theology and Ministry based in the Diocese of Banks and Torres and Assistant Mission Secretary of the Anglican Church of Melanesia.
