= Bishop of Glasgow and Galloway =

Diocesan bishop in the Scottish Episcopal Church

- Bishopric

anglican
- Incumbent: Nicholas Bundock

Location
- Ecclesiastical province: Scotland

Information
- First holder: Michael Russell
- Established: 1837
- Diocese: Glasgow and Galloway
- Cathedral: St Mary's Glasgow

The Bishop of Glasgow and Galloway is the ordinary (diocesan bishop) of the Scottish Episcopal Church Diocese of Glasgow and Galloway.

== Brief history ==
When the dioceses of Glasgow and Galloway were combined in 1837, Michael Russell, the then incumbent of Leith became the first bishop of the combined see. Initially there were only three or four congregations in the south west of Scotland.

Until the establishment of St Mary's Church in Great Western Road as the cathedral of the diocese, the bishops were also incumbents of individual congregations - Michael Russell at Leith, Walter Trower at St Mary's Church in Glasgow and William Wilson at Ayr.

The episcopate of William Harrison was specially notable for the exceptional expansion of the church in the south west of Scotland.

Bishop Reid was translated to the Diocese of Saint Andrews, Dunkeld and Dunblane. His successor, Bishop Darbyshire, was also translated becoming the Archbishop of Cape Town in the Church of the Province of Southern Africa (now the Anglican Church of Southern Africa).

Bishop Rawcliffe was already a bishop when he came to the diocese having previously been consecrated at the first Bishop of the New Hebrides in the Church of the Province of Melanesia between 1974 and 1980.

== Bishops of the united diocese ==
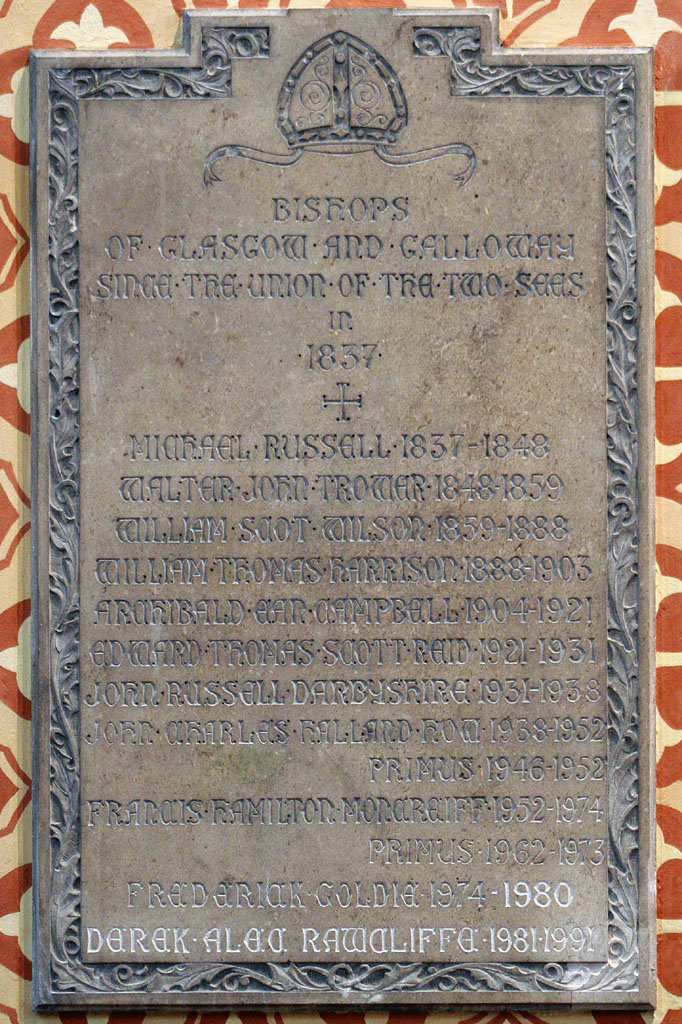
First bishop's plaque in the chancel of St Mary's Cathedral

The bishops of the combined See of Glasgow and Galloway are listed on two plaques on the south wall of the chancel in St Mary's Cathedral. As the first plaque was filled recording the episcopate of Bishop Rawcliffe, a second plaque was installed following the enthronement of Bishop Taylor.

A gallery of portraits of the past bishops is displayed in the sacristy corridor in the cathedral.

- 1837–1848: Michael Russell
- 1848–1859: Walter Trower
- 1859–1888; William Wilson
- 1888–1903: William Harrison
- 1904–1921: Ean Campbell
- 1921–1931: Edward Reid
- 1931–1938: Russell Darbyshire
- 1938–1952: John How (Primus 1946–1952)
- 1952–1974: Francis Moncreiff (Primus 1962–1973)
- 1974–1980: Frederick Goldie
- 1981–1991: Derek Rawcliffe
- 1991–1998: John Taylor
- 1998–2009: Idris Jones (Primus 2006–2009)
- 2010–2018: Gregor Duncan
- 2020–2024: Kevin Pearson
- 2025–present: Nicholas Bundock
