= Diocese of Glasgow and Galloway =

Anglican diocese of the Scottish Episcopal Church

Coordinates: 55.826°N 4.320°W

Diocese of Glasgow and Galloway Dioecesis Glasguensis et Candidae Casae o Gallovidianus

Location
- Country: Scotland
- Territory: Dumfries and Galloway, Ayrshire, Lanarkshire, Dunbartonshire, Renfrewshire, West Stirlingshire
- Ecclesiastical province: Scotland
- Subdivisions: Seven regions: Ayrshire, Galloway, Glasgow North-East, Glasgow North-West, Glasgow South, Lanarkshire, and Renfrewshire
- Headquarters: Diocesan Centre, 49 Cochrane Street, Glasgow G1 1HL, Scotland

Statistics
- Congregations: 54
- Members: 4,014 (2023)

Information
- Denomination: Scottish Episcopal Church
- Cathedral: St Mary's Cathedral, Glasgow
- Patron saint: Saint Mungo and St Ninian

Current leadership
- Bishop: Nicholas Bundock

Map
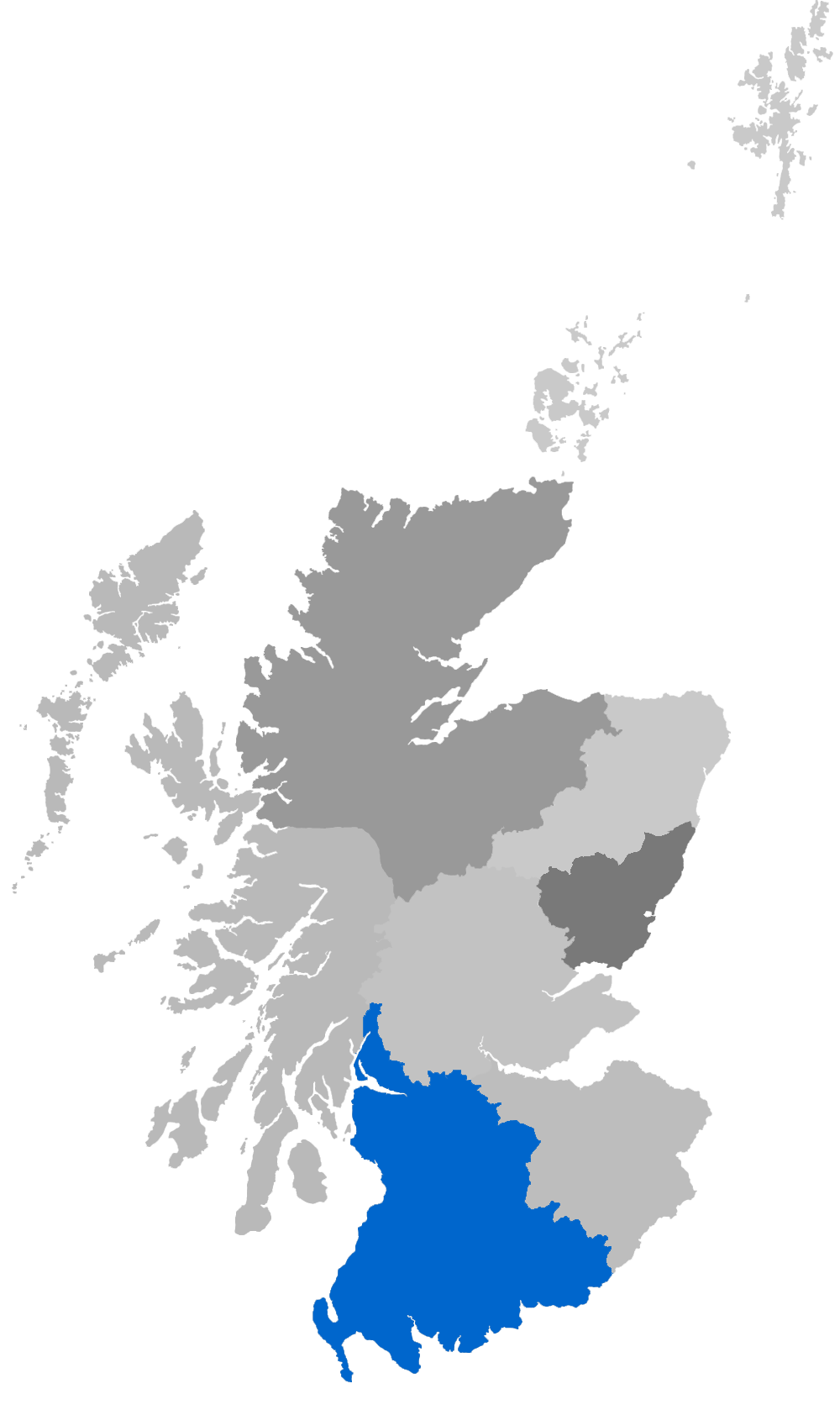
- Map showing Glasgow Diocese within Scotland

Website
- glasgow.anglican.org

The Diocese of Glasgow and Galloway is one of the seven dioceses of the Scottish Episcopal Church. It covers Dumfries and Galloway, Ayrshire, Lanarkshire (including Glasgow), Dunbartonshire, Renfrewshire and west Stirlingshire (south of the River Forth). The cathedral of the diocese is St Mary's Cathedral, Glasgow.

== History ==
The Diocese of Glasgow and Galloway is a union of two of the oldest dioceses in Scotland. The Diocese of Galloway (also known as Candida Casa or Whithorn) is thought to have been founded by Saint Ninian in the 5th century. The Diocese of Glasgow is thought to have been founded by Saint Mungo (or Kentigern) around 550. On 9 January 1492, the Diocese of Glasgow was raised in rank to be an archdiocese.

During the Scottish Reformation, the heritage and jurisdiction of the church passed into the hands of Church of Scotland. However, the small Scottish Episcopal Church continued the line of bishops of both diocese, even though, in the 16th century, many of them held the office in title alone. In 1697, the Diocese of Galloway was united with the Diocese of Edinburgh. In 1708, the episcopal line experienced a hiatus before continuing with Alexander Duncan, in 1731, as Bishop (rather than Archbishop) of Glasgow. However, when Duncan died two years after his appointment as bishop, the see fell vacant once more. In 1787, William Abernethy Drummond became Bishop of Edinburgh and Galloway and Bishop of Brechin in a temporary personal union of the dioceses. To this he added the then vacant see of Glasgow in union with Edinburgh and Galloway. Within a year, Drummond gave way to John Strachan as the newly appointed Bishop of Brechin, and, in 1805, resigned from the united see of Edinburgh and Galloway (to Daniel Sandford) to focus on ministry in Glasgow. Drummond continued as Bishop of Glasgow until his death in 1809, when the see was reunited with Edinburgh and Galloway.

In 1837, James Walker, bishop of the triple see and Primus, gave way to Michael Russell to be the first modern Bishop of Glasgow and Galloway. In 1878, the Roman Catholic Church formed a new Archdiocese of Glasgow and Diocese of Galloway in its modern structures. In 1888, the counties of Selkirkshire, Peeblesshire and Roxburghshire, which were historically part of the Diocese of Galloway, were transferred from the Diocese of Glasgow and Galloway back to Edinburgh.

Gregor Duncan was elected the fourteenth bishop of the diocese on 16 January 2010. He was consecrated and enthroned as bishop on 23 April 2010, and retired on 11 October 2018.

Kevin Pearson was elected the fifteenth bishop of the diocese on 18 January 2020. He was installed by deed on 1 July 2020, and retired on 31 August 2025.

Nicholas Bundock was elected the sixteenth bishop of the diocese on 18 January 2025. He was consecrated and enthroned as bishop on 3 May 2025.

== Companion Dioceses ==
The Diocese of Glasgow and Galloway formerly had companion links with the Episcopal Diocese of Byumba (Rwanda), the Episcopal Diocese of Kentucky (ECUSA) and the Lutheran Diocese of Gothenburg, Sweden.

== Area and population ==
The diocese covers the historic counties of Dunbartonshire, Renfrewshire, Lanarkshire, Ayrshire, Wigtownshire, Kirkcudbrightshire, Dumfriesshire and western Stirlingshire.

This total population of approximately 2,334,000 gives the diocese a ratio of one priest to every 68,600 inhabitants and one church to every 42,400 inhabitants.

== List of churches ==
The diocese currently has 32 stipendiary clergy and 54 active churches.

| Benefice | Name | Link | Clergy | Ref |
|---|---|---|---|---|
| Helensburgh (St Michael and All Angels) | St Michael & All Angels, Helensburgh (1814) | | Rector: Dominic Ind | |
| Dumbarton (St Augustine) | St Augustine, Dumbarton (1848) | | Rector: Heller Gonzalez | |
| Bearsden (All Saints) | All Saints, Bearsden (1897) | | Rector: David Guest | |
| Milngavie (St Andrew) | St Andrew, Milngavie (c1880) | | Rector: Andrea Hagenbuch | |
| Glasgow (Cathedral of St Mary the Virgin) | St Mary's Cathedral, Glasgow (c1689) | | Provost: Kelvin Holdsworth; Vice-Provost: Vacant | |
| Glasgow East End Churches | St John, Baillieston (1850); St Serf, Shettleston (1899) | | Priest-in-Charge: Tess Lowe | |
| Glasgow (St Bride) | St Bride, Glasgow (1891) | | Priest-in-Charge: Peter Bradley | |
| Glasgow (All Saints) | All Saints, Jordanhill (c1861) | | Priest-in-Charge: Sydney Maitland | |
| Glasgow (St Oswald) | St Oswald, King's Park (1931) | | Priest-in-Charge: Alison Mathew | |
| Glasgow (St Margaret) | St Margaret of Scotland, Newlands (1898) | | Rector: Gordon Fyfe; Assistant Priest: Charlotte Methuen | |
| Glasgow (St Ninian) | St Ninian, Pollokshields (1870) | | Rector: Verity Brown | |
| Glasgow (St Matthew) | St Matthew, Possilpark | | Priest-in-Charge: David Wostenholm | |
| Bishopbriggs (St James-The-Less) | St James the Less, Bishopbriggs (1875) | | Rector: Paul Watson | |
| Lenzie (St Cyprian) | St Cyprian, Lenzie (1873) | | Rector: Vacant | |
| Cumbernauld (Holy Name) | Holy Name, Cumbernauld | | Rector: Kirstin Freeman | |
| Airdrie (St Paul) | SS Paul & John the Evangelist, Monklands (1843) | | Rector: Kirstin Freeman | |
| Motherwell (Holy Trinity) | Holy Trinity, Motherwell (1884) | | Rector: Vacant | |
| Wishaw (St Andrew) | St Andrew, Wishaw (1893) | | Rector: Vacant | |
| Cambuslang (St Cuthbert) | St Cuthbert, Cambuslang (1899) | | Priest-in-Charge: Vacant | |
| East Kilbride (St Mark) | St Mark, East Kilbride (1953) | | Priest-in-Charge: Vacant | |
| Hamilton (St Mary the Virgin) | St Mary, Hamilton | | Rector: Matthew Little | |
| Uddingston (St Andrew) | St Andrew, Uddingston (1890) | | Rector: Matthew Little | |
| Lanark (Christ Church) | Christ Church, Lanark (1850) | | Rector: Drew Sheridan | |
| Clarkston (St Aidan) | St Aidan, Clarkston (1923) | | Rector: Nicholas Taylor | |
| Renfrew (St Margaret) | St Margaret, Renfrew (1914) | | Priest-in-Charge: Reuben Preston | |
| Johnstone (St John) | St John, Johnstone (1874) | | Priest-in-Charge: Reuben Preston | |
| Paisley (Holy Trinity and St Barnabas) | Holy Trinity & St Barnabas, Paisley (1817) | | Rector: Deborah Davison | |
| Glasgow (Good Shepherd) | Good Shepherd, Hillington (1938) | | Rector: Deborah Davison | |
| Bridge of Weir (St Mary) | St Mary, Bridge of Weir (1907) | | Priest-in-Charge: Lisa Curtice | |
| Kilmacolm (St Fillan) | St Fillan, Kilmacolm (1905) | | Priest-in-Charge: Lisa Curtice | |
| Port Glasgow (St Mary the Virgin) | St Mary the Virgin, Port Glasgow (1855) | | Priest-in-Charge: Lisa Curtice | |
| Greenock (St John the Evangelist) | St John the Evangelist, Greenock (1824) | | Rector: Wilhelmina Nesbitt | |
| Largs (St Columba) | St Columba, Largs | | Rector: Vacant | |
| Ardrossan (St Andrew) | St Andrew, Ardrossan (1852) | | Priest-in-Charge: Vacant | |
| Dalry (St Peter) | St Peter, Dalry (1889) | | Priest-in-Charge: Vacant | |
| Kilmarnock (Holy Trinity) | Holy Trinity, Kilmarnock (1857) | | Priest-in-Charge: Harriet Johnston | |
| Troon (St Ninian) | St Ninian, Troon (1912) | | Rector: Keith Thomasson | |
| Prestwick (St Ninian) | St Ninian, Prestwick (1915) | | Rector: Jane Ross | |
| Ayr (Holy Trinity) | Holy Trinity, Ayr (1886) | | Rector: Martyn Trembath | |
| Maybole (St Oswald) | St Oswald, Maybole (1847) | | Priest-in-Charge: Liz Crumlish | |
| Challoch (All Saints) | All Saints, Challoch (1871) | | Priest-in-Charge: Dawn Matthew | |
| New Galloway (St Margaret of Scotland) | St Margaret of Scotland, New Galloway (1904) | | Priest-in-Charge: Dawn Matthew | |
| Portpatrick (St Ninian) | St Ninian, Portpatrick (1916) | | Priest-in-Charge: Elizabeth Breakey | |
| Stranraer (St John the Evangelist) | St John the Evangelist, Stranraer (1892) | | Priest-in-Charge: Elizabeth Breakey | |
| Gatehouse of Fleet (St Mary) | St Mary, Gatehouse of Fleet (c1799) | | Rector: Alison Hudson | |
| Kirkcudbright (St Francis of Assisi) | Greyfriars, Kirkcudbright (1878) | | Rector: Alison Hudson | |
| Castle Douglas (St Ninian) | St Ninian, Castle Douglas (1855) | | Rector: Vacant | |
| Dalbeattie (Christ Church) | Christ Church, Dalbeattie (1875) | | Rector: Vacant | |
| Dumfries (St John the Evangelist) | St John the Evangelist, Dumfries (c1690) | | Rector: Vacant; NSM: James Clark Maxwell | |
| Eastriggs (St John the Evangelist) | St John the Evangelist, Eastriggs (1917) | | Priest-in-Charge: Vacant | |
| Gretna (All Saints) | All Saints, Gretna (1917) | | Priest-in-Charge: Vacant | |
| Lockerbie (All Saints) | All Saints, Lockerbie (1891) | | Rector: Vacant | |
| Moffat (St John the Evangelist) | St John the Evangelist, Moffat (1879) | | Rector: Vacant | |

=== Former congregation ===
| Benefice | Church | Link | Note | Refs |
|---|---|---|---|---|
| Glasgow (St Silas) Private Chapel | St Silas, Glasgow (1864) | | Left the SEC in 2019. | |

=== Defunct churches ===
| Name | Founded | Ended | History/notes | Ref |
|---|---|---|---|---|
| All Saints, Langholm | | c. 1995 | | |
| Ascension, Mosspark | | 1987 | | |
| Christ Church, Glasgow | | c. 1977 | | |
| Holy Cross, Knightswood | 1926 | 2013 | | |
| Holy Trinity, Glasgow | | c. 1983 | | |
| St Andrew's-by-the-Green | 1750 | 1975 | Oldest SEC building erected in Scotland since Reformation. Initially Qualified Chapel | |
| St Andrew, Gartcosh | 1897 | 1994 | | |
| St Andrew, Irvine | | 2021 | | |
| St Barnabas, Dennistoun | | 1983 | | |
| St Barnabas, Paisley | | 2004 | | |
| St Columba, Clydebank | 1896 | c. 2008 | Building vacated 1996 | |
| St Gabriel, Govan | | c. 1993 | | |
| St George, Maryhill | | c. 2005 | | |
| St John, Girvan | 1847 | 2014 | Building 1859, demolished 2012 | |
| St John the Baptist, Barrowfield | | c. 1996 | | |
| St John the Evangelist, Annan | 1843 | 2024 | | |
| St Luke, Glasgow | | 1952 | | |
| St Martin, Glasgow | | c. 1983 | | |
| St Bartholomew, Gourock | | 2022 | | |
| St Michael, Govan | | c. 1953 | | |
| St Mungo, Alexandria | | 2021 | | |
| St Paul, Airdrie | 1893 | c. 1992 | | |
| St Peter, Glasgow | | c. 1963 | Rebuilt 1899 | |
| Sancta Sophia, Douglas | | c. 2005 | | |

== See also ==
- Presbytery of Glasgow (Church of Scotland)
- Roman Catholic Archdiocese of Glasgow
