= Kidnapped (1995 film) =

1995 film directed by Ivan Passer

- VHS cover
- Genre: Adventure drama
- Based on: Kidnapped by Robert Louis Stevenson
- Teleplay by: John Goldsmith; Michael Barlow
- Directed by: Ivan Passer
- Starring: Armand Assante; Brian McCardie; Michael Kitchen; Brian Blessed; Patrick Malahide; Brendan Gleeson
- Music by: Stanislaw Syrewicz
- Country of origin: United States
- Original language: English

Production
- Executive producers: Francis Ford Coppola; Fred Fuchs; Robert Halmi Sr.
- Producer: John Davis
- Cinematography: Denis Lewiston
- Editor: Bernard Gribble
- Running time: 175 minutes (2 parts)
- Production companies: American Zoetrope; Hallmark Entertainment

Original release
- Network: The Family Channel
- Release: November 5 – November 6, 1995

Kidnapped is a 1995 American adventure drama television film directed by Ivan Passer and starring Armand Assante as Highlander Alan Breck and Brian McCardie as Lowlander David Balfour. Among the supporting actors are Michael Kitchen and Brian Blessed. The film was based on the 1886 novel Kidnapped by Robert Louis Stevenson. Christopher Reeve had originally been cast as Breck prior to his horse riding accident which left him paralyzed.

The film was shot in Ireland.

== Plot ==
The adaptation starts by describing a divided Scotland which is populated by Highlanders and Lowlanders who are loyal to different kings. Alan Breck Stewart is characterised as a leading figure of Jacobitism who tried "to keep the flame alive". It ends when Stewart leaves Scotland forever "to have a distinguished career in the French Army", while Balfour stays and marries a lady from the Highlands. Another voice-over tells they had sons who "were neither Highlanders nor Lowlanders. They were Scots."

=== Part 1 ===
Alan Breck Stewart (Armand Assante) returns to his home village, which is already menaced by the highland clearances. His foster father James Stewart of the Glen (Brian McGrath) issues the taxpayers' money for the exiled House of Stuart to him and beseeches him to meet King George's factor, the "Red Fox" Colin Roy Campbell of Glenure (Brendan Gleeson). Alan Stewart only grudgingly complies, because he regards the “Red Fox” as a traitor, for at the Battle of Culloden he had to fight against Loudon's Highlanders, a regiment of Highlanders led by Campbells.

At about the same time David Balfour (Brian McCardie) leaves the fictitious small village Essendean in the Scottish Lowlands. Reverend Campbell tells him he was given a letter in charge by David's late father. It is a letter of introduction addressing a Laird. The reverend informs him that his late mother never wanted him to go to the “House of Shaws” and asks him to stay in Essendean. But David is driven by wanderlust, and therefore resolves to go.

The "Red Fox" receives Alan Stuart with an abettor who holds the guest at gun point. An English officer named William Reid (Michael Kitchen) and his soldiers are in waiting when the "Red Fox" offers to protect James Stewart of The Glen. Alan Stuart asks him twice to swear his kin will be protected indeed but even so he merely receives a mute grin. Alan decides the man cannot be trusted and eludes in order to continue his mission.

David has meanwhile reached the “House of Shaws”. He also finds all of a sudden a gun directed at him. The man who threatens to shoot him turns out to be his uncle Ebenezer (Patrick Malahide). Ebenezer reluctantly invites him in, but later arranges an accident that is intended to kill his nephew. David survives, yet the next day Ebenezer has him kidnapped by a criminal sea captain. David wakes up on a ship going to America, where he shall be sold as a slave.

While David is trapped, William Reid and “the Red Fox” try to assassinate Alan Breck in the woods. They fail because William Reid smokes a pipe with strong tobacco. Alan Breck, who therefore can literally smell the trap, steals a horse and escapes. He leaves a paper with a quote from A Counterblaste to Tobacco written by James I of England. The “Red Fox” relishes this humiliation of Englishman William Reid.

David becomes the ship's new cabin boy, for the previous cabin boy has been murdered by the sailor Mr. Shuan. Alan Breck, who needs to leave for France in a foggy night, accidentally ends up on the same ship. David is supposed to wait on Alan. The criminal sea captain attempts to ambush Alan for his gold but David confounds these plans and helps Alan Breck to stand his ground. A severe storm then causes a shipwreck.

Alan and David return as castaways to the Scottish shore. Alan runs into his friend Ewan of Appin, who was just exposed as a Jacobite spy. As his dying friend informs him, William Reid plans to frame James Stewart of The Glen for a murder he is about to carry out. Alan tries to prevent this but he can only witness how the "Red Fox” is shot dead by a sniper. David gets the impression Alan was the assassin and parts ways with him.

=== Part 2 ===
David is caught by British soldiers who consider him an accomplice of the murderer. Alan frees him. Once they are safe, Alan refutes David's theories about the murder. Both of them go to James Stewart of The Glen and warn him. Against his will, he is defended by them when the Red Coats come to arrest him.

Soon William Reid himself comes to Alan's home village in order to arrest Alan's foster father. James Stewart of The Glen sacrifices himself for his people's sake, but despite that they are driven off the land. Captain Forbes (Adam Blackwood), William Reid's direct subordinate, is appalled.

Alan seeks to prove James Stewart's innocence. He visits gunsmith Angus (David Kelly), who has produced the very gun used for the Appin Murder. Angus will not reveal the identity of the murderer, but says enough that Alan Breck can guess the suspect comes from House Macdonald. Alan now goes to the Earl of Dunbrea (Alan Stanford), a former MacDonald clan chief and asks him for support. The Earl's granddaughter Mary gives up the name Hamish MacDonald (Jonathan Ryan), and guides Alan and David to the place her cousin is staying.

Hamish does confess the murder but William Reid kills him under the pretence of self-defence. Alan is put in prison and is forced to watch James Stewart of The Glen being executed. David, with the assistance of the Earl of Dunbrea and his granddaughter Mary, frees Alan Breck. In order to hide, Alan visits his old brother-in-arms Ewen MacPherson of Cluny (Brian Blessed).

William Reid concedes to Captain Forbes that he has indeed paid Hamish MacDonald to kill the “Red Fox”. As Captain Forbes learns, the “Red Fox” was considered too lenient towards his fellow countrymen and now William Reid is his successor as the King's factor. Following that Captain Forbes meets with Alan Breck and condones Reid's looming demise. Even so, before Alan Breck finally confronts William Reid and kills him, he takes care that David can eventually successfully claim his heritage. After he had done for David Balfour, what he failed to achieve for Bonnie Prince Charlie, he puts an end to William Reid's deceptive schemes and then leaves Scotland forever.
