= John Roy Stewart =

Scottish poet and officer

John Roy Stewart or Stuart or Stiuart (Gaelic: Iain Ruadh Stiùbhart) (1700–1752) was a distinguished officer in the Jacobite Army during the rising of 1745 and a war poet in both Gaelic and in English.

== Life ==
He was born at Knock in Kincardine in Badenoch. His father, Donald Stewart, was a farmer in Strathspey and grandson of the last Baron of Kincardine. Iain Ruadh was born to his father's second wife, Barbara Shaw.

As Iain Ruadh's family was cultured and well-connected but no longer wealthy, his father gave him a good education and procured him a commission as a lieutenant in the Scots Greys which at that time was serving in Flanders. In 1730, after being refused a commission in the Black Watch, Stewart resigned from the British Army and was subsequently employed as a covert agent between the House of Stuart government in exile at the Palazzo Muti in Rome and Lord Lovat in Scotland. During an extended visit by Stewart to Beaufort Castle in 1736, according to later trial testimony, Stewart and Lord Lovat, "diverted themselves composing burlesque verse (in Gaelic) that when young Charles comes over, there will be blood and blows."

At Lord Lovat's later trial for high treason before the House of Lords, Sutherland cattle drover John Gray of Rogart testified that Iain Ruadh was always well dressed, but that his clothing often alternated, especially during dangerous undercover missions, between traditional Highland garb or the long coats and greatcoats then favoured by dandies from the British upper class.

After secretly visiting a friend from Strathspey at the British encampment on the night before, Stewart fought in the French Royal Army under the command of Marshal Maurice de Saxe at the Battle of Fontenoy on 11 May 1745. Before the end of the same month, he had returned to Scotland and joined Prince Charles Edward Stuart at Blair Atholl on 31 August 1745. He left his wife, Sarah Hall, and their daughter behind at Boulogne, and asked that Prince James Francis Edward Stuart see that his family be provided for should he fall in the coming rising.

In the Jacobite Army he served as military commander of the Edinburgh Regiment at Gladsmuir, Clifton, and Falkirk.

Iain Ruadh had previously fathered an illegitimate son named Charles Stewart, who fought for the Hanoverian army in Loudon's Highlanders during the Battle of Prestonpans. Although this meant that father and son were fighting on opposing sides, there is no account of any encounter between them.

Before the Battle of Culloden, Stewart offered to lead his troops around the Water of Nairn and attack the Duke of Cumberland's army from the rear, but his offer was not accepted.

For five months after the battle "Stewart was a hunted fugitive with a price on his head, and in Urnuigh Iain Ruaidh, 'John Roy's Prayer', and in 'John Roy's Psalm', the latter composed in English, he describes the dangers he ran from his pursuers at a moment when he had the misfortune to have sprained his ankle."

According to an account attributed to fellow senior Jacobite Army officer Ewen MacPherson of Cluny, in September 1746, Prince Charles requested that Iain Ruadh Stùibhart be sent for. Wishing to surprise him, the prince arranged for the poet to be summoned to a bothy and laid down inside, keeping his face covered by his plaid. As Stùibhart was brought into the entryway, the prince stood up, removed the plaid covering, and displayed his face. Iain Ruadh Stùibhart, who had believed Prince Charles to have been either captured or killed, was overwhelmed with emotion and cried out, (Scottish Gaelic: "Mo Thighearna! Mo Mhaighstir!") "My Lord! My Master!" The bard then fainted dead away and fell into a muddy pool besides the bothy entrance, much to the mirth of all present. The prince always afterwards referred to Iain Ruadh Stùibhart by the nickname, "the Bothy."

Stewart left Scotland with the prince for France from the site now marked with the Prince's Cairn at Loch nan Uamh on 20 September 1746. Upon arrival in France, he joined Charles' household, and was briefly imprisoned alongside the prince in the Château de Vincennes in 1748. After a period in the Netherlands, Stewart was among the five British attendants who accompanied Charles Edward Stuart to Rome in 1766. He succeeded John Hay of Restalrig as majordomo of the household and by 1768 was the last British attendant left with Charles. In 1784 he was granted a baronetcy in the Jacobite peerage, with remainder to the heirs-male of his body. Charles granted Stewart a legacy of £750 a year, although this was stopped when Henry Benedict Stuart succeeded Charles as head of the House of Stuart. He died in 1752 at Saint-Omer.

== Legacy ==
In 2000, the 1745 Association erected a roadside memorial cairn near Iain Ruadh Stùibhart's birthplace. Iain Ruadh Stùibhart, whose life was also locally celebrated by a 2007 Fèis, still remains a beloved folk hero in his native district.

== Literary legacy ==
Some of his most well-known poems are "Lament for Lady Macintosh" and "Latha Chuil-Lodair" ("Culloden Day"), "Òran Eile air Latha Chu-Lodair ("Another Song on Culloden Day"), Urnuigh Iain Ruaidh ("John Roy's Prayer"), and Òran a' Bhranndaidh ("Song to Brandy").

Iain Ruadh's poetry is replete with references to the Christian Bible. For example, he compared the Jacobite rising to the events of the Book of Exodus, as an effort to set the British people free from enslavement to both Whig political ideology and the House of Hanover. His most famous poem, John Roy's Psalm, which was composed in English while its author was on the run after Culloden, is an adaptation of the Metrical rendering of Psalm 23:

"The Lord's my targe, I will be stout,
With dirk and trusty blade,
Though Campbells come in flocks about
I will not be afraid."

According to John Lorne Campbell, Stewart's importance to Scottish Gaelic literature is increased by the fact that, "He was the only Jacobite leader who was a Gaelic poet. His Gaelic verse shows a polish and an elegance not possessed by his contemporaries, and it is much to be regretted that so few of his compositions have survived. He does not seem to have possessed the knowledge of writing his mother tongue. His two poems on Culloden are of great historical interest, revealing as they do the depth of bitterness that was felt towards the Prince's lieutenant general, Lord George Murray, by a section of the Jacobite leaders."

== In popular culture ==
John Roy Stewart is widely believed in some circles to have been the main model for Robert Louis Stevenson's fictionalized depiction of Allan Breck Stewart in his novel Kidnapped and in its sequel Catriona.
