= Kidnapped (2005 TV series) =

- Genre: Drama
- Created by: Robert Louis Stevenson
- Written by: Bev Doyle; Richard Kurti
- Directed by: Brendan Maher
- Starring: Iain Glen; James Anthony Pearson; Adrian Dunbar; Emily Barclay
- Country of origin: United Kingdom
- Original language: English
- No. of series: 1
- No. of episodes: 3

Production
- Executive producer: Diana Kyle
- Producer: Diana Kyle
- Running time: 50 mins
- Production company: South Pacific Pictures

Original release
- Network: BBC One
- Release: 27 February – 13 March 2005

Kidnapped is a two-part BBC television adaptation of the 1886 novel of the same name by Robert Louis Stevenson. The show is directed by Brendan Maher and stars James Anthony Pearson as Davie Balfour and Iain Glen as Alan Breck.

== Production ==
On 1 December 2004, it was announced that the BBC had commissioned Kidnapped.

== Plot ==
Among the plot deviations from novel to film:

- The film added a love interest for Davie in Catriona, the daughter of James of the Glen. This plot element is from Stevenson's sequel novel, Catriona.
- In the novel Kidnapped, Breck and James of the Glen were never arrested by the British, but the film showed James of the Glen being falsely arrested with the threat of being hanged, to force Breck to give himself up. The arrest of James of The Glen is another feature taken from Catriona.
- The film added the Long Mile Gang, expert trackers, to track Davie and Breck across Scotland, but the novel only had British troops.
