= Kidnapped (1960 film) =

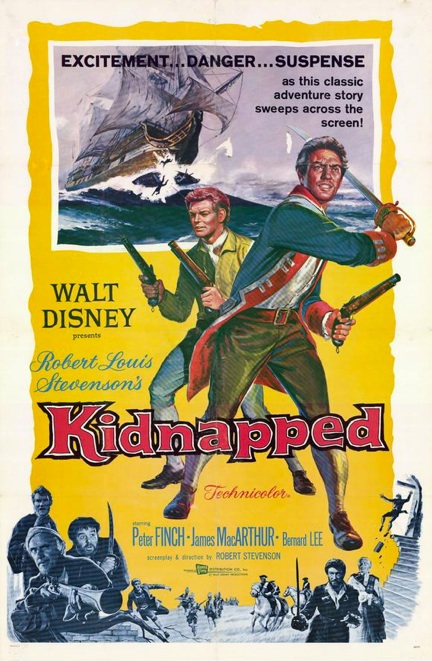
- Original theatrical poster by Reynold Brown
- Directed by: Robert Stevenson
- Written by: Robert Stevenson
- Based on: Kidnapped; 1886 novel by Robert Louis Stevenson
- Produced by: Walt Disney
- Starring: Peter Finch; James MacArthur; Bernard Lee
- Cinematography: Paul Beeson
- Edited by: Gordon Stone
- Music by: Cedric Thorpe Davie
- Production company: Walt Disney Productions
- Distributed by: Buena Vista Distribution
- Release date: February 24, 1960
- Running time: 97 minutes
- Country: United States
- Languages: English, Scots

Kidnapped is a 1960 American adventure drama film directed by Robert Stevenson. It is based on Robert Louis Stevenson's classic 1886 novel Kidnapped. It stars Peter Finch and James MacArthur, and was Disney's second production based on a novel by Stevenson, the first being Treasure Island. It also marked Peter O'Toole's feature-film debut.

== Plot ==
In 18th-century Scotland, young David Balfour takes a letter of introduction from his recently deceased father to the House of Shaws, where he is greeted without much enthusiasm by his miserly uncle Ebenezer. David finds that Ebenezer is disliked by his neighbours and begins to ask questions about family affairs. Ebenezer tries to arrange a fatal accident for David. David accompanies Ebenezer to a meeting with a seafaring associate, Captain Hoseason. Hoseason lures David aboard his ship and shanghais him, at Ebenezer's instigation.

At sea, David learns he is to be sold into indentured servitude. A fog comes up and the ship collides with a boat. Alan Breck Stewart, the only survivor of the boat, is brought aboard and pays for his passage, but the captain plots to kill him for the rest of his money. David warns Alan, and they overcome the crew. Alan coerces Hoseason into putting them ashore. The ship founders, but David manages to reach land.

After several dangerous encounters, he is rescued by Alan, who turns out to be a Jacobite wanted by the authorities. Evading the soldiers, the two make their way back to the House of Shaws, where Alan tricks Ebenezer into admitting his crimes within the hearing of a hidden witness, allowing David to claim his inheritance.

== Cast ==
- Peter Finch as Alan Breck Stewart
- James MacArthur as David Balfour
- Bernard Lee as Captain Hoseason
- John Laurie as Ebenezer Balfour
- Niall MacGinnis as Mr. Shuan
- Finlay Currie as Cluny MacPherson
- Miles Malleson as Mr. Rankeillor
- Duncan Macrae as The Highlander
- Andrew Cruickshank as Colin Campbell
- Peter O'Toole as Robin MacGregor
- Alex Mackenzie as The Ferryman
- Oliver Johnston as Mr. Campbell
- Norman MacOwan as Tinker
- Eileen Way as Jennet Clouston
- Edie Martin as the woman on the bridge (from whom Alan Breck buys the pipe and tobacco)
- Abe Barker as Donald Dhu MacLaren
- Richard Evans (uncredited) as Ransome, the cabin boy

== Production ==
=== Development ===
Robert Stevenson was making Disney's Darby O'Gill and the Little People (1959) in England when Walt Disney visited the set and suggested they adapt Robert Louis Stevenson's novel Kidnapped for their next project. Stevenson re-read the novel, was enthused, and wrote a treatment on a working holiday in Scotland. When another project he was working on fell through, Stevenson wrote a screenplay for Kidnapped. Despite having the same first and last names, and with Disney press materials claiming for years that he was a distant relative of author Robert Louis Stevenson, the director said that they were unrelated.

Earlier film adaptations of the novel had been produced by Edison Studios in 1917 and by 20th Century Fox in 1938 and in 1948. 20th Century Fox had registered rights to the title but waived them and the film was announced in December 1958.

Stevenson says Walt Disney was of great use when working on the script. Many people advised Stevenson to put a woman in the story, but Disney resisted, saying it was not true to the novel. By the time filming started, Stevenson estimated he had read the novel "eight to ten times".

=== Casting ===
The lead role was given to James MacArthur, who had just made The Light in the Forest (1958) and Third Man on the Mountain (1959) for Disney and been signed to a two-picture deal with the studio (the second film would be Swiss Family Robinson).

The other lead role was given to Peter Finch who had just appeared in The Nun's Story (1959).

Peter O'Toole was given a small role at the suggestion of Peter Finch. It was O'Toole's first released film; he would shortly become a sensation of the London stage with his performance in The Long and the Short and the Tall.

=== Shooting ===
Filming started 27 April 1959 on location in Oban in Scotland, with studio work done at Pinewood in London.

Stevenson wanted to film the assassination of Colin Roy Campbell in the actual locale, a few miles from Ballachulish, but the original spot was now the site of a forest of Norwegian pines, so he filmed it on the slopes of Ardgour, about twelve miles away.

== Reception ==
=== Box office ===
Kine Weekly called it a "money maker" at the British box office in 1960.

=== Critical ===
Upon the film's original release, New York Times film critic Eugene Archer gave the film a negative review by stating that, "either Mr. Disney, who made a vigorous Treasure Island ten years ago, has lost his touch in the intervening decade, or the kids have been spoiled by Gunsmoke and Peter Gunn. Yesterday's audience was definitely not amused."

== See also ==
- List of American films of 1960
