= Duncan Stewart of Ardsheal =

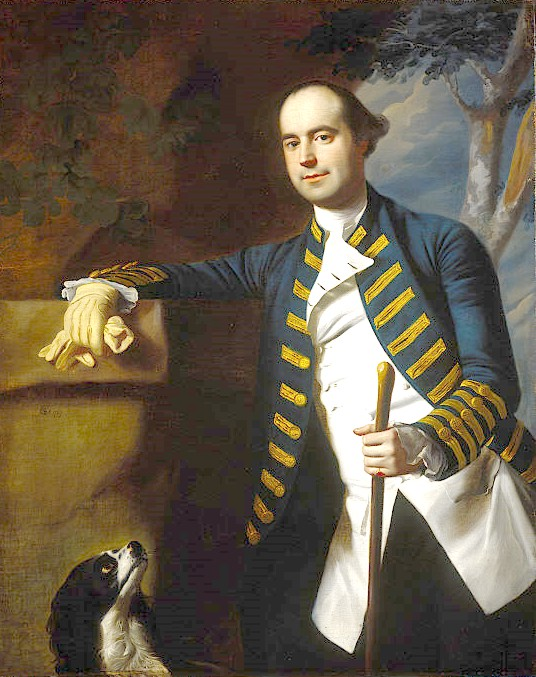
Duncan Stewart of Ardsheal by John Singleton Copley

Duncan Stewart (born 15 August 1738 at Ardsheal) was 10th Chief of the Clan Stewart of Appin and 6th of Ardsheal. He was the eldest surviving son of Charles Stewart, 5th of Ardsheal, the Jacobite leader of the Clan regiment at the Battle of Culloden, 16 April 1746, during the Jacobite Rising of 1745 and Isabel Haldane of Lanrick daughter of John Haldane 2nd of Lanrick. He had two older brothers, Alexander born 1735 who died as a child by 1745 and John. John was born 31 January 1734. On 27 June 1750, he put forward a claim for his father's forfeited estate on the grounds that his parents' marriage contract contained a clause for securing it upon the heirs but the action was dismissed 30th of that same month. He afterwards commanded the Duke of Albany East Indiaman and made out his Will on 11 December 1768 by the terms of which he gave all of his “estate and effects” to his brother John. He died at Bencoolen, in 1769. It is he rather than his brother who was known to Boswell.

Stewart was born at Ardsheal, from where his father Charles Stewart (5th of Ardsheal) had fled to France, dying at Sens, 15 March 1757, having escaped from Scotland in 1746. After the Battle of Culloden, he was tried in absentia for high treason, sentenced to death, and all his estates had been confiscated by the Forfeited Estates Commission.

In 1752, Duncan's uncle, James Stewart of the Glen, was convicted and hanged at Ballachulish for ordering the assassination in the Wood of Lettermore of government-appointed estate factor Colin Roy Campbell of Glenure. Campbell had ordered and carried out multiple evictions of Stewart clansmen and their replacement with members of Clan Campbell. At the time of his assassination by a marksman, he was on the way to enforce yet another large-scale estate clearance at Duror. The trial and execution of Duncan Stewart's uncle, which helped inspire Robert Louis Stevenson's novel Kidnapped, is still alleged in the local oral tradition to have been a miscarriage of justice.

Duncan Stewart became collector of customs in New London, Connecticut, and later in Bermuda. During the American War of Independence, Stewart fought as a Loyalist military officer and was rewarded by having the estate in Ardsheal, that had been confiscated from his father, returned to him in 1789.

Stewart is remembered best for his portrait by John Singleton Copley owned by the Stewart Society and currently on display at Scone Palace, Perth Scotland. Stewart settled back in Scotland on his returned estates where he inherited the chieftainship of Clan Stewart of Appin on the death of his cousin, Dugald Stewart, 9th of Appin.

Stewart married Anne Erving daughter of the Hon. John Erving, loyalist Governor of Boston, and a member of His Majesty's Council for the Province and his wife Anne Shirley of Shirley-Eustis House and daughter of William Shirley Governor of Massachusetts. Duncan Stewart and Anne Erving had 10 children including the prelate James Haldane Stewart. The Stewart Society also owns a portrait of Anne Irving painted by Copley.

Duncan Stewart died on 12 September 1793 in London and was buried in Old St Pancras churchyard. His grave is lost but is not listed on the 19th-century monument erected to record the names of important lost graves.
