= James Haldane Stewart =

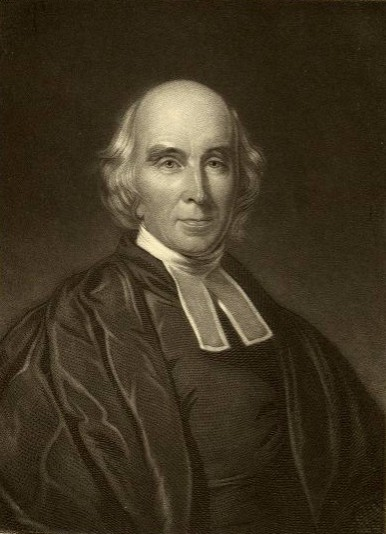
James Haldane Stewart

James Haldane Stewart (23 December 1776 – 22 October 1854) was rector of Limpsfield, Surrey, where he lies buried.

== Early life ==
James Haldane Stewart was born in Boston, Massachusetts, the third son of Duncan Stewart of Ardsheal (died 1793). His father was 10th Chief of Clan Appin, and married in 1767 Anne Erving of Boston. She was the daughter of Hon. John Erving of Connecticut, loyalist Governor of Boston and a member of His Majesty's Council for the Province and his wife, Anne Shirley, the daughter of William Shirley colonial, Governor of the Province of Massachusetts Bay and owner of the Shirley-Eustis House. He was educated at Dr Valpy’s school in Reading, Berkshire and Eton College, after which he trained at Lincoln's Inn, for a career in law. Stewart was converted in 1802 through his contact with the Anglican clergyman William Marsh and Thomas Tyndale.

== Ordination ==
Stewart matriculated in 1803 at Exeter College, Oxford and graduated B.A. in 1806 and M.A. in 1811. He was ordained deacon in 1806 and priest in 1807; and was appointed curate of Basildon with Ashampstead in Berkshire in 1809. From 1812 to 1828 he officiated at Percy Chapel in London, despite suffering a breakdown in health in 1817 which necessitated a visit to the Continent.

He was the first minister of St Bride's Church, Liverpool, on 29 December 1830. He named the street there Percy Street, after the Percy Chapel, which was in Percy Street, London.

== Activities ==
Stewart was an active supporter of the London Society for Promoting Christianity Amongst the Jews (a Jewish Christian missionary society now known as the Church's Ministry Among Jewish People or CMJ), the Church Missionary Society and the Protestant Reformation Society. He built his own chapel in Liverpool and ministered there from 1830 to 1846. Stewart after 1820 was a strong advocate of prayer for the outpouring of the Holy Spirit. Stewart was Rector of Limpsfield in Surrey during his final years.

== Publications ==
In 1820, he published Hints for the General Union of Christians for the Outpouring of the Spirit.

== Family ==
Stewart married Mary Dale, daughter of David Dale, on 15 August 1816 in Edinburgh, Scotland.

The Rev. James Haldane Stewart Jr., his elder son, (18 October 1820 – 24 February 1879) was curate at Limpsfield, and married Emily Katherine Leveson-Gower, daughter of William Leveson-Gower, of Titsey Place on 22 May 1866. He was the rector of Millbrook, Hampshire, from 1855 to 1866 and then Brightwell-cum-Sotwell, Berkshire (now transferred to Oxfordshire). The couple had six daughters:

- Mary Emily Haldane Stewart (1869–1948)
- Pamella Frances Haldane Stewart (1870–1949)
- Anne Cecelia Diana Stewart (1872–1951)
- Lilian Leveson Gower Stewart (1873–1889)
- Caroline Sophia Campbell Stewart (1875–1965) who married the Rt Reverend Ernest Blackie, Dean of Lincoln
- Katherine Maria Gresham Stewart (1877–1886)

== Sources ==
- Memoir of the life of the Rev. James Haldane Stewart, M.A. by his second son Rev David Dale Stewart. Thos. Hatchard, 187, Piccadilly, London. 1857, which ran to two editions
- Dictionary of Evangelical Biography, edited by Donald Lewis (1995)
