= Terry Richards =

British actor and stuntman

David Terence Richards
- Born: 2 November 1932; South London, England
- Died: 14 June 2014 (aged 81); Ruislip, England
- Occupations: Actor; stuntman
- Years active: 1957–1997
- Known for: Arab swordsman in Raiders of the Lost Ark (1981)

David Terence Richards (2 November 1932 – 14 June 2014) was a British actor and stuntman, best known for his appearance as the Arab swordsman in the 1981 Indiana Jones film Raiders of the Lost Ark. During his career, Richards worked on over 100 productions across film and television; worked in nine James Bond films; fought as a stuntman in scenes with Indiana Jones, James Bond, Luke Skywalker and Rambo; and doubled for Donald Sutherland, Tom Selleck and Christopher Lee.

== Biography ==
Born in South London to Welsh parents, he served in the Welsh Guards. After finishing his national service, in 1957 whilst working as a scaffolder, a friend from the Guards told him they needed extras with military training. After gaining the job, he was asked if he could fall off scaffolding during a riot scene, which he accepted. In 1958 he served as a fighting extra alongside Kirk Douglas in The Vikings, and in 1960 was a co-founder of The Stunt Register, a UK industry list of accredited stunt performers. He also appeared in an episode of The Avengers as a Cybernaut, a murderous silver robot controlled by Peter Cushing (1967) "Return of the Cybernauts".

Richards' most famous scene was as the scripted "large Arabian swordsman" in the 1981 Indiana Jones film Raiders of the Lost Ark. Director Steven Spielberg shot the production's Cairo, Egypt-located fight scenes in the town of Kairouan, Tunisia. Richards had practiced for weeks with his heavy Arab sword to create the scripted fight scene, choreographing a fight between the swordsman and Jones's whip. However, after filming the initial shots of the scene (and with Harrison Ford suffering from dysentery), after lunch, Ford and Spielberg agreed to cut the scene down to a single gunshot, giving Jones a humorously unfair advantage. It was later voted in at No.5 on Playboy magazine's list of best all-time scenes, and also created a Lego character of the large Arab.

Richards retired after his last performance in the 1997 James Bond film Tomorrow Never Dies, where his character beat-up Pierce Brosnan in a recording studio in Germany. Richards lived his later life in Ruislip. His funeral service and burial took place on 24 June 2014 at Breakspear Crematorium following his death from a sudden cardiac arrest in his sleep.

== Filmography ==
Year	Title	Role	Notes
1960	The Flesh and the Fiends	Medical Student	Uncredited
1966	The Idol	Laborer	
1966	Daleks – Invasion Earth: 2150 A.D.	Resistance Member	Uncredited
1967	The Dirty Dozen	Sergeant MacIntosh Blake	Uncredited
1968	Attack on the Iron Coast	Commando	Uncredited
1968	Hammerhead	Parking Garage Thug	Uncredited
1971	The Last Valley	Norseman	Uncredited
1971	1000 Convicts and a Woman		
1973	Kidnapped	Mungo Campbell	
1973	The Mackintosh Man	Inmate	Uncredited
1976	Confessions of a Driving Instructor	Monks Hill Rugger Team	
1978	The Pink Panther Strikes Again	Bruce the Knife	
1980	The Empire Strikes Back	Wampa	Uncredited
1980	Flash Gordon	Ming's Brute #4	
1981	Raiders of the Lost Ark	Arab Swordsman	
1983	High Road to China	Ginger	
1985	Red Sonja	Djart	
1988	Haunted Summer	Fletcher	
1988	The Bourne Identity	Johann	
1990	Good Girl, Bad Girl	Man	Uncredited
1997	Tomorrow Never Dies	Carver's thug	Uncredited, (final film role)
