= Kidnapped (1978 miniseries) =

1978 television film

Kidnapped, also known as The Adventures of David Balfour, was a 1978 TV miniseries, based on Robert Louis Stevenson's novel Kidnapped, with some elements taken from his novel Catriona. It was a French - West German co-production. Peter Graham Scott was the producer and scriptwriter.

The cast included:

- David McCallum as Alan Breck
- Ekkehardt Belle as David Balfour
- Jutta Speidel as Barbara Grant
- John Carson as James More
- James Cosmo as Beggar
- Bill Simpson as James of the Glens
- Patrick Magee as Ebenezer Balfour
- Christopher Biggins as Prince Charlie
- Aude Landry as Catriona Drummond

== David's Song (Who'll Come With Me) ==
The soundtrack was written by Vladimir Cosma and the theme song, "David's Song (Who'll Come With Me)", by Cosma and Dan Kelly, patriarch of The Kelly Family. The song was the band's breakthrough hit when released as a single in 1979, reaching #1 in the Dutch Single Top 100, #3 in the Ultratop for Flanders, and #15 in Germany where it charted for 20 weeks. In 1982, a cover version by Irish band Chips reached number 13 in Ireland.
