= Catriona (novel) =

1893 novel by Robert Louis Stevenson

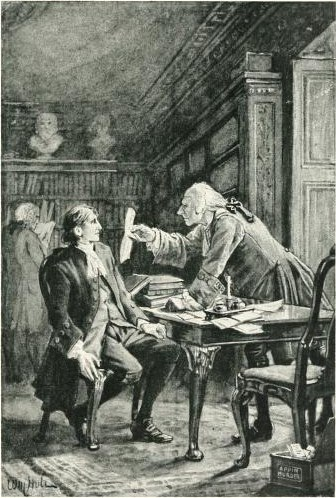
- David Balfour in office of the legal firm
- Author: Robert Louis Stevenson
- Illustrator: William Brassey Hole
- Language: Victorian era Scottish English, Lowland Scots, Highland English
- Genre: Adventure, historical
- Publisher: Cassell and Company Ltd
- Publication date: 1893
- Publication place: Scotland
- Pages: 371
- Preceded by: Kidnapped (1886)

Catriona (also known as David Balfour) is an 1893 novel written by Robert Louis Stevenson as a sequel to his earlier novel Kidnapped (1886). It was first published in the magazine Atalanta from December 1892 to September 1893. The novel continues the story of the central character in Kidnapped, David Balfour.

== Plot summary ==
The book begins precisely as Kidnapped ends, at 2 pm on 25 August 1751, outside the British Linen Company in Edinburgh.

The first part of the book recounts the attempts of the hero, David Balfour, to gain justice for James Stewart (James of the Glens), who has been arrested and charged in airts and pairts with the Appin Murder. David makes a statement to a lawyer and goes on to meet William Grant of Prestongrange, the Lord Advocate, to press the case for James' innocence. However, his attempts fail, as after being reunited with Alan Breck he is once again kidnapped, and held on the Bass Rock, an island prison in the Firth of Forth, until the trial is over, and James is condemned to death. David also meets and falls in love with Catriona MacGregor Drummond, the daughter of James MacGregor Drummond, known as James More (who was Rob Roy's eldest son), also held in prison, whose escape she engineers. David also receives some education in the manners and morals of polite society from Lady Barbara Grant, Prestongrange's daughter.

In the second part, David and Catriona travel to Holland, where David studies law at the University of Leyden. David takes Catriona under his protection (she having no money) until her father finds them. James More eventually arrives and proves something of a disappointment, drinking a great deal and showing no compunction against living off David's largesse. At this time, David learns of the death of his uncle Ebenezer, and thus gains knowledge that he has come into his full, substantial inheritance. David and Catriona, fast friends at this point, begin a series of misunderstandings that eventually drive her and James More away, although David sends payment to James in return for news of Catriona's welfare. James and Catriona find their way to Dunkirk in northern France. Meanwhile, Alan Breck joins David in Leyden, where he berates David for not understanding women.

It's this way about a man and a woman, ye see, Davie: The weemenfolk have got no kind of reason to them. Either they like the man, and then a' goes fine; or else they just detest him, and ye may spare your breath – ye can do naething. There's just the two sets of them – them that would sell their coats for ye, and them that never look the road ye're on. That's a' that there is to women; and you seem to be such a gomeral that ye cannae tell the tane frae the tither.

Prodded thus, and at an invitation from James More, David and Alan journey to Dunkirk to visit with James and Catriona. They all meet one evening at a remote inn and discover the following day that James More has betrayed Alan (who has faced trial in absentia and been wrongfully convicted of the Appin Murder) into the hands of a Royal Navy warship anchored near the shore. The British sailors attempt to capture Alan, who flees with David and Catriona, now reconciled and shamed by James More's ignominy. The three flee to Paris, where David and Catriona are married. James More dies from an illness, and David and Catriona return to Scotland to raise a family.

== Characters ==
The characters of Alan Breck Stewart, Lord William Grant Prestongrange, James of the Glens, James MacGregor Drummond (Rob Roy's eldest son), the 3rd duke of Argyll, Simon Fraser of Lovat, Prophet Peden and Hugh Palliser were real people and the frigate HMS Seahorse actually existed.

However, the heroine who gives her name to the novel is a fictional character. The real James MacGregor had seven sons and six daughters, none of them named Catriona.

== Adaptations ==
The 1971 film Kidnapped was based on Kidnapped and the first half of Catriona.
