= Kidnapped (play) =

2023 play by Isobel McArthur

- Promotional poster
- Written by: Isobel McArthur
- Based on: Kidnapped by Robert Louis Stevenson
- Music by: Michael John McCarthy
- Genre: Adventure; Romantic comedy

Premiere
- Date: 28 March 2023
- Place: Beacon Arts Centre, Greenock
- Directed by: Isobel McArthur; Gareth Nicholls

Kidnapped is a 2023 Scottish play created by Isobel McArthur and Michael John McCarthy for the National Theatre of Scotland, based on the 1886 novel by Robert Louis Stevenson.

Billed as ‘a swashbuckling rom-com adventure’, the play toured locations in Scotland and England from March to May 2023.

== Background and premise ==
Following the success of McArthur and McCarthy's previous collaboration Pride and Prejudice* (*sort of), Kidnapped takes a similar approach to adapting its source material. The play is a broadly faithful adaptation of the novel, but uses modern language and makes some major changes in presentation. Frances Stevenson, Robert Louis Stevenson's wife and literary collaborator who suggested the story of Kidnapped, appears as a narrator, relating the events of the plot to her own experiences and her relationship with her husband. Music, also mostly modern, is a key element; songs including ’I've Been Everywhere’, ‘Only You’ and a Gaelic version of ‘Road to Nowhere’ are performed live by the cast to accompany the action.

Additionally, the play presents the relationship between the main characters Davie Balfour and Alan Breck Stewart as a romance. McArthur said about this decision, ‘There are a multitude of political reasons why it feels important and useful to me, but I also feel it’s in the pages of the novel. They clearly love each other’, while actor Malcolm Cumming commented, ‘What this adaptation of Kidnapped does is examine the story and the relationships in light of our acceptance and understanding of relationships today to create a modern and extremely faithful retelling of the story.’

== Production history ==
The play premiered at the Beacon Arts Centre in Greenock on 28 March 2023, running until 1 April. It then toured to the Theatre Royal, Glasgow (5-8 April); the Royal Lyceum Theatre, Edinburgh (11-22 April); Eden Court Theatre, Inverness (25-29 April); Perth Theatre (3-6 May); and Northern Stage, Newcastle upon Tyne (9-13 May), before finishing its tour at the Theatre Royal, Brighton (18-20 May) as part of Brighton Festival. It was directed by McArthur and Gareth Nicholls.

== Cast and characters ==
National Theatre of Scotland performer	Character
Ryan J MacKay	Davie Balfour
Malcolm Cumming	Alan Breck Stewart
Kim Ismay	Frances Stevenson
Christina Gordon	Ensemble
Danielle Jam	Ensemble
Fatima Jawara	Ensemble
Grant O’Rourke	Ensemble
David Rankine	Ensemble
Isaac Savage	Ensemble
Karen Young	Ensemble

== Reception ==
The play received generally favourable reviews. The Times called it a ‘hugely enjoyable show’, praising the ‘lively and affectionate’ writing and the ‘heartfelt’ performances by the lead actors and the ensemble; The Guardian described the cast as ‘plucky and lovable’, while The Stage praised the ‘infectious exuberance’ created by McArthur's ‘special talent’; both these reviews also especially noted the music and the set design.

== Award nominations ==
Kidnapped was nominated for four Critics' Awards for Theatre in Scotland, in the categories of Best Ensemble, Best Design, Best Music and Sound and Best Production.
