= Kidnapped (1971 film) =

1971 British adventure film directed by Delbert Mann

- Original British quad film poster
- Directed by: Delbert Mann
- Screenplay by: Jack Pulman
- Based on: Kidnapped and Catriona by Robert Louis Stevenson
- Produced by: Frederick H. Brogger
- Starring: Michael Caine; Trevor Howard; Jack Hawkins; Donald Pleasence; Lawrence Douglas; Vivien Heilbron
- Cinematography: Paul Beeson
- Edited by: Peter Boita
- Music by: Roy Budd
- Production company: Omnibus Productions Ltd
- Distributed by: Rank Films (UK); American International Pictures (US)
- Release dates: 22 December 1971 (US); 4 May 1972 (UK)
- Running time: 107 minutes
- Country: United Kingdom
- Language: English

Kidnapped is a 1971 British adventure film, directed by Delbert Mann and starring Michael Caine, Trevor Howard, Jack Hawkins and Donald Pleasence, as well as a number of well-known British character actors. The film is based on the 1886 novel Kidnapped and the first half of the 1893 sequel Catriona by Robert Louis Stevenson.

== Plot ==
After the Battle of Culloden the Duke of Cumberland's troops ruthlessly suppress the Jacobite Rebellion.

Young David Balfour arrives at a bleak Scottish house, the House of Shaws, to claim his inheritance. The house and land have been under the custodianship of his father's brother, Ebenezer Balfour, but on reaching adulthood, the land and property become David's. Ebenezer is having none of it, however, so he first tries to murder him, then has him kidnapped by sea captain Hoseason, with whom he has "a venture for trade in the West Indies". David is shipped off to be sold as a slave in the Carolinas. He strikes up a friendship with Alan Breck, escaping from Charles Edward Stuart's defeat at Culloden. Breck is in a coble which is run down in the fog by Hoseason's ship and once aboard, asks Hoseason to take him to France. When Hoseason refuses, Breck offers him 60 guineas to put him down on Loch Linnhe.

On discovering that Breck has a money belt full of Jacobite gold, Hoseason and his crew try to kill Breck, but he is forewarned by David and the two kill half a dozen of the crew before the others retreat. Hoseason offers terms to end the fighting, but the ship runs aground. Only Breck and Balfour appear to survive and they manage to get to land. They set out for Edinburgh, dodging the ruthless Redcoats. Numerous adventures follow as they meet up with Breck's family, friends and foes alike. These include Breck's cousin, James Stewart, and his daughter Catriona, with whom David falls in love.

Breck hopes to incite another rebellion for Scottish independence but James Stewart and his clan would have none of it. James felt that the Battle of Culloden was terrible and unnecessary. He also reasoned with Breck that the Redcoats could never be defeated in the future as they had better tactics and cannon. Later on, a Scottish Captain of a Redcoat patrol is killed in a skirmish with the Stewart Clan on a farm. Subsequently, Breck, David and Catriona quickly flee the scene, but the seriously injured James, being assumed dead, is abandoned and then captured. He gets the blame for the killing and is imprisoned in the Castle. Later on, David and Catriona part with Breck and meet up with a lawyer to defend James. They are allowed to visit James in the Castle. They explain to the lawyer that James Stewart is innocent of the killing although they do not know who killed the Captain. It is pointed out, however, that David is risking his life by giving evidence to the fact. They are visited by the Lord Advocate and his daughter who explain to them that a New Scotland is in the making as part of the Union with England, so therefore rebellions by the Highland Clans in the future are not necessary. The Lord Advocate tells them both that he is a highlander too but would wish Alan Breck to be captured and killed. Unbeknownst to the Lord Advocate, Breck, hiding in a large cupboard, was listening in to their conversation in anger and still wished to carry out a future rebellion. Finally Catriona meets Alan out in the Scottish countryside and pleads with him to reconsider rebelling against England, as Scotland is no longer interested in fighting. Alan Breck is then left to himself, viewing the countryside and has memories of the people being killed in the futile Battle of Culloden. He feels guilty for the young men he sent out to their deaths. He finally realizes that a New Scotland does not need him. It turns out that it was he that killed the Captain. The film ends when he decides to hand himself in to the Castle occupied by the Redcoats in order to save James.

== Cast ==
- Michael Caine as Alan Breck
- Lawrence Douglas as David Balfour
- Vivien Heilbron as Catriona Stewart
- Trevor Howard as Lord Advocate Grant
- Claire Nielson as Barbara Grant
- Jack Hawkins as Captain Hoseason
- Donald Pleasence as Ebenezer Balfour
- Gordon Jackson as Charles Stewart
- Andrew McCulloch as Andrew (Charles Stewart's clerk)
- Freddie Jones as Cluny MacPherson
- Jack Watson as James Stewart
- Peter Jeffrey as Riach
- Roger Booth as the Duke of Cumberland
- Geoffrey Whitehead as Lieutenant Duncansby
- Terry Richards as Mungo Campbell
- Barbara Siddall as lady looking for her husband in the opening credits
- Daniel Siddall as young son looking for his father in the opening credits

== Production ==
The film was produced by Frederick Brogger, through his company Omnibus Productions, which Brogger half owned with actor James Franciscus). Omnibus made four classical adaptations of novels, all of which were directed by Delbert Mann: Heidi (1968), David Copperfield (1970), Jane Eyre (1971) and Kidnapped. Franciscus said "We saw that no one was doing the classics. We felt there was a need and a place for that kind of film." The films were sold to NBC television, who had the right to show the films twice in the USA (they aired on Bell System Family Theatre). They were also made for theatrical release. The films were expensive because they were shot on location.

The original title was David and Catriona. Delbert Mann says they wanted to focus more on those characters than Alan Breck, but wanted to give Breck "more guts and more balls" than he was traditionally portrayed. They wrote in scenes where Breck commits premeditated murder but ultimately had to cut them out due to the censor.

The filmmakers realised that the film would be too expensive for television. They told NBC who pulled out and the project was refinanced with American International Pictures putting up NBC's share instead. This made Kidnapped Omnibus' first purely theatrical film.

Leads Lawrence Douglas and Vivien Heilbron were relatively unknown. Filming started in London at Pinewood Studios on 10 May 1971. Five weeks location shooting began in Scotland on 30 May. Scottish locations included Argyll, Mull, Culross and Stirling Castle. The opening moorland scene of the end of the Battle of Culloden was filmed in Argyll, with Highlander extras provided by Lochaber High School and Redcoat extras by Oban High School. Pinewood Studios was used for some interior scenes.

Caine later said he "never got paid for" the film. "They made it when they didn’t have the money to make it. I got a small percentage just so they would be able to release it, to get at least some money back on it. It was an absolute and utter disaster from beginning to end." Mann confirms that "no one was paid fully" and says Caine "was a key figure to get us through it."

Mann says a number of actors had to be looped because American audiences would not understand the thick Scottish accents.

== Music ==
The soundtrack was composed and conducted by Roy Budd. The end title song, "For All My Days", was sung by Mary Hopkin.

== Reception ==
=== Critical ===
The Los Angeles Times called it "something of a disappointment".

Pauline Kael said "Jack Pulman has drawn a trim, craftsmanlike screenplay" and the director "keeps everything comprehensible, though he doesn’t seem to know how to make the narrative stirring. Fortunately, Michael Caine acts Alan Breck with a mixture of swagger and intelligence that keeps the movie alive." Filmink argued "the film is worth seeing for Caine’s Alan Breck."

=== Box office ===
In April 1972 Sam Arkoff called the film "a good, opulent movie but business has only been medium." He felt "the lack of something different has held back" the film.

== Notes ==
- Hall, William (2003). 70 not out : the biography of Sir Michael Caine.
