= Allan Breck Stewart =

Scottish soldier and Jacobite

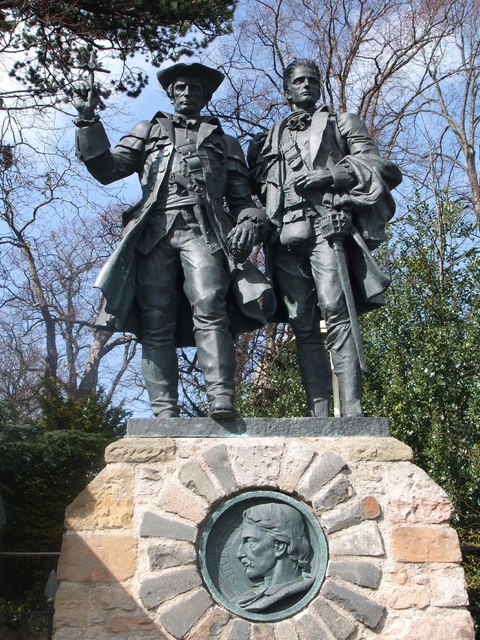
Statue of Allan Stewart (left) and the fictional David Balfour (right), from Robert Louis Stevenson's Kidnapped.

Allan Breck Stewart (Gaelic: Ailean Breac Stiùbhart; c. 1722 – c. 1791) was a Scottish soldier and Jacobite. He was also a prime suspect in the Appin Murder case, that inspired novels by Sir Walter Scott and Robert Louis Stevenson.

== Life and the Appin murder ==
In accordance with the fosterage customs of the Highland clans, Allan Stewart and his brothers grew up under the care of their relative James of the Glen in Appin. His nickname, Breck, came from the Gaelic breac meaning "spotted", as his face bore scars from smallpox. Stewart enlisted in the British Army of George II in 1745, just before the Jacobite rising of that year. He fought at the Battle of Prestonpans, but deserted to the Jacobite Army. He subsequently fought alongside his clansmen, but after they were defeated at the Battle of Culloden, he fled to France, accompanying his commander and clan captain, Colonel Charles Stewart of Ardshiel (Ardshiel was not the chief of the Appin Stewarts, but took command in the absence of the chief). After joining one of the Scottish regiments serving in the French Royal Army, Stewart was sent back to Scotland to collect rents for the exiled Scottish clan chiefs and to recruit soldiers for the French crown.

On 14 May 1752, Colin Campbell of Glenure, the royal estate Factor collecting rents from the Stewarts of Appin and ordering evictions in an early version of the Highland Clearances, was murdered by a sniper in the wood of Duror. As Allan Stewart had publicly threatened the life of Glenure and had enquired about his schedule for the day in question, a warrant was issued for his arrest. However, he evaded capture. He was tried in absentia and sentenced to death. His foster father, James, was convicted as an accessory to the murder and hanged. Later assessments of the evidence have reached mixed conclusions as to whether Allan Stewart was in fact the murderer, and to whether James Stewart had any involvement. In the murder of Glenure, the British government saw the potential danger of the assassination of their estate factors and officials in the Highlands, on the one hand, and also a potential renewal of a Campbell/Stewart feud, on the other. The execution of James of the Glen increased the Stewarts' discontent. Locally, especially after he was immortalised in fiction, Allan Breck Stewart was portrayed as a romantic figure.

Some time after the murder Stewart escaped to France, where he continued his military career, being awarded the prestigious Military Merit Cross before retiring from the army in 1777. The last records of him were two sightings in Paris in the late 1780s, at which time he still maintained that he was not the murderer of Glenure.

== In popular culture ==
Stewart appears as a leading character in Robert Louis Stevenson's 1886 novel Kidnapped, which dramatises the Appin murder. In Stevenson's version of events the fictionalised Alan Breck Stewart witnesses Glenure's murder along with the protagonist David Balfour, but he is not the murderer. Iain Ruadh Stiùbhart, a covert agent for the House of Stuart government in exile and important war poet in Scottish Gaelic literature, is widely believed in some circles to have been the main model for Stevenson's fictionalized depiction of Allan Breck in the novel Kidnapped.

Kidnapped has been widely adapted for radio, screen and the stage; actors to have portrayed Alan Breck Stewart include Peter Finch (Kidnapped (1960 film)), Michael Caine (Kidnapped (1971 film)), David McCallum (Kidnapped (1978 miniseries)), Armand Assante (Kidnapped (1995 film)), Iain Glen (Kidnapped (2005 TV series)), Michael Nardone (BBC Radio, 2016) and Malcolm Cumming (Kidnapped (play)).

== The Alan Breck's Prestonpans Volunteer Regiment ==
Founded in 2007, the Alan Breck's Prestonpans Volunteer Regiment is a living history and battle re-enactment society focusing on the 1745 Rising and associated histories. Half of the society portray redcoat soldiers and half Jacobites, in recognition of Stewart's service on both sides of the conflict, and is accordingly named after him. The society is based in Prestonpans, East Lothian, but performs at events around the country and has members from across Scotland.

== Sources ==
- Nicholson, Eirwen E. C. "Allan Stewart", in Matthew, H.C.G. and Brian Harrison, eds. The Oxford Dictionary of National Biography. vol. 52, 628. London: OUP, 2004.
- Nimmo, Ian (2005). Walking with Murder: On the Kidnapped Trail. Birlinn Ltd. Paperback.
- Gibson, Rosemary. "The Appin Murder: In Their Own Words" History Scotland. Vol.3 No.1 January/February 2003
- MacArthur, Lt. Gen. Sir William: 'The Appin Murder and the Trial of James Stewart' (1960) JMP Publishing.
- Hunter, Professor James.'Culloden and the Last Clansman'
