= Clan Stewart of Appin =

Scottish clan branch

- Stiùbhairt
- Motto: Quihidder Wil Ȝie (Whither will ye? i.e., what/which will you choose?)
- War cry: Creag an Sgairbh ("The Cormorant's Rock") (Castle Stalker sits atop this)

Profile
- District: Appin Duror, West Coast Scotland, above Oban, below Ballaculish
- Plant badge: Darag (Oak)
- Animal: Unicorn
- Pipe music: Bratach Bhàn nan Stiùbhartach (The white banner of the Stewarts)

Chief
- Andrew Francis Stewart of Lorn, Appin and Ardsheal, 17th of Appin & 12th of Ardsheal
- (MacIain Stiùbhairt na h-Apainn)
- Seat: Castle Stalker
- Historic seat: Castle Stalker
Septs of Clan Stewart of Appin
McMichael, MacColl, MacLeay, MacClay, Livingstone, MacGillemichael, McIlmichael, Carmichael, MacCombich, Combich (occasionally anglicised to Thomson), MacInnes, MacRobb, MacMichael.
Clan branches
Ardsheal, Achnacone, Fasnacloich, Invernahyle, Strathgarry
Allied clans
Clan MacLaren
Clan Cameron
Clan MacDonald of Glencoe
Rival clans
Clan MacGregor
Clan Campbell
Clan Drummond
Clan MacDonald of Keppoch

Clan Stewart of Appin is the West Highland branch of the Clan Stewart and have been a distinct clan since their establishment in the 15th century. Their Chiefs are descended from Sir James Stewart of Perston, who was himself the grandson of Alexander Stewart, the fourth High Steward of Scotland. His cousin Walter Stewart, the 6th High Steward, married Marjorie Bruce, the daughter of King Robert the Bruce, and their son Robert II was the first Stewart Monarch. The Stewarts of Appin are cousins to the Royal Stewart Monarchy.

== History ==
=== Origins of the clan ===
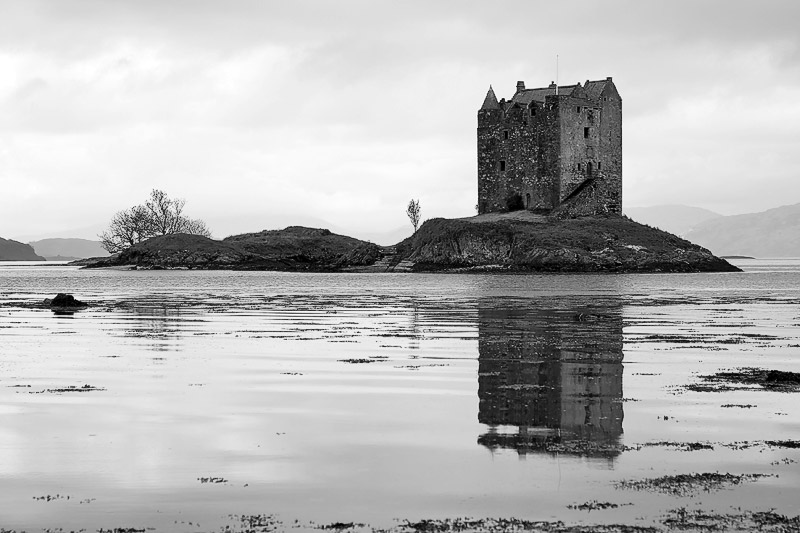
Castle Stalker

The Appin Stewarts is the West Highland branch of Clan Stewart, descend from Sir James Stewart of Pierston, 4th son of Sir John Stewart of Bonkill, second son of Alexander, the 4th High Steward of Scotland. Sir James was the grandfather of John Stewart of Innermeath, who, through marriage to Isabel MacDougall, daughter of John Gallda MacDougall, Lord of Lorne, became the first Stewart Lord of Lorne. The Lordship of Lorne passed down for 2 more generations to Sir John Stewart, the third Stewart Lord of Lorne.

Appin is located on the Scottish West Coast between Benderloch to the South and the Ballachulish Narrows to the north in modern-day Argyll. Today the primary towns include Port Appin and Portnacroish. Both are scenic and are surrounded by forests and water. To the west are islands including the island of Lismore, home to the MacLea and the Baron Buchull, keeper of the Buchull Mhòr (the crosier of St. Moluag), adherents of Appin. There are numerous sights of interest including Ardsheal's Cave, Castle Stalker, the Clach Ruric, Cnap a-Chaolais, Eilean Munde and Keil churchyard.

=== 15th century ===
Tradition tell us that in 1445, while returning to his seat at Dunstaffnage Castle from the great cattle tryst at Crieff, Sir John met and fell in love with the daughter of MacLaren of Ardveich, Loch Earn Balquhidder. Although married, he began an affair with his new love which one year later produced a son. The first son of this union was called Dugald, and went on to become the progenitor of the famous Clan Stewart of Appin. Sir John Stewart was born around 1410, putting him at about 35 when he met the woman that would become his second wife.

After the death of his first wife, Sir John waited for five years before setting up the marriage between himself and Dugald's mother. We do not know why, but it may have been for political reasons. In 1463, Sir John set a wedding date and sent for Dugald and his mother to come to Dunstaffnage. Unknown to Sir John, there was a plot to kill the Lord of Lorn. It is not fully known, but it is thought to have been set up by the Lord of the Isles who was in a power struggle with the King of Scots, and who saw it as being in his best interest to neutralize this powerful and loyal representative of the King in the west highlands. The other plotters, which some feel included Colin Campbell, Lord Argyll, Sir John's son-in-law, were primarily represented by Alan MacCoul, the illegitimate grandson of an earlier MacDougall chief. As the lightly armed wedding party made its way from Dunstaffnage to the small chapel about 180 yards from the castle walls, they were attacked by a superior force led by Alan MacCoul. Although better armed, MacCoul's force was defeated, but not before mortally wounding the Lord of Lorn. Sir John was rushed into the chapel and MacCoul and his henchmen ran into and occupied the deserted Dunstaffnage. With his last breath Sir John married Dugald's mother, legitimising him and making him the de jure Lord of Lorn. After receiving the last rites, Sir John expired and a new chapter in West Highland history opened. Dugald gathered all the adherents of the Lord of Lorn and with the assistance of the MacLarens laid siege to Dunstaffnage, but to no avail. Unbeknownst to Dugald, Colin Campbell, Lord Argyll, who seemed to have been involved in the plot, raised a group of MacFarlanes to aid MacCoul in his struggle against the de jure Lord of Lorn. MacCoul's men with the MacFarlanes met the men of Lorn and MacLaren in what was to be known as the battle of Leac a dotha. It was a fierce battle with both sides leaving the field with very heavy losses.

For the next few years Dugald, who had lost the title of Lord of Lorn through the treachery of his uncle Walter Stewart and the lord of Argyll, but had retained Appin and Lismore, consolidated his power and fortified the hunting lodge of Castle Stalker on the Cormorant's Rock in Loch Laich. He also ensured that the Campbells were in no doubt about his displeasure over the loss of the Lordship of Lorn, by having the Campbell territory surrounding Appin regularly raided by the clan. Finally, in 1468, in a bid to finally destroy the power of Appin, Colin Campbell and Walter Stewart, the latter now recognised as the Lord of Lorn (but with no authority in Lorn), organised a massive raid against Dugald and his clan. Alan MacCoul was again involved and they met at what was to be known as the Battle of Stalc. Though losing many men, Dugald virtually destroyed the military strength of the MacFarlanes (a destruction from which they were never to recover) and personally killed Alan MacCoul, his father's murderer. The battle solidified Dugald's claim to Appin and the surrounding area, which was formally granted to him by King James III on 14 April 1470. In 1497 or 1498 Dugald Stewart of Appin was killed at the Battle of Black Mount fighting against the Clan MacDonald of Keppoch.

It should be noted here, that the only primary source record of the extended traditional narrative supplied above by Michael Starforth and the Stewarts, are two brief recordings, shown below. One the obituary of Sir John Stewart by the Dean of Lismore and the other by the Scots Parliament. Nothing about a wedding party love story of McLarens from Ardveich or anything else along those lines.

==== Charters and the murder ====
“In 1451, Sir John M’ Robert Stewart, Lord of Lorn completed a deed granting to his nephew John M'Alan M’Cowle, 11th Chief of Clan MacDougall of Nether Lorn and Dunollie, Argyll, with remainder to the chiefs son, John Keir MacDougall, and his heirs male, the 29 merk land of the island of Carrarry, the 6 merk land of Dunollych, the 8 merk land of Glensellach, the 10 merk land of Gallawnoche and of Colgyn, the 10 merk land of Melliag, and the 8 merk land of Ardnahowe, in Kilbride ; the 8 merk land of Ardnohowe, and the 8 merk land of Dowanchowe, in Kilinver; also, the 8 merk land of Dowach, the 10 merk land of Melrog, the 22 merk land of Degnish, and others in Kilbrandon. Merk land refers to the annual rent value of the property.”,

Sir John Stewart, Lord of Lorn also conferred on John M'Alan M’Cowle (MacDougall) and his heirs the office of baillie of all the lands in Lorn which he then had or might have; and, further, gave to John M’Alan M’Cowle, and his son, John Keir MacDougall, the onerous and very noteworthy trust of the guardianship and pupilage (alumniam et nutrimentum) of John Stewart, Lord of Lorn’s heirs, a young son Dugald and other sons whose names are unknown.

Sir John Stewart of Lorn had thus placed his kinsman, the chief of the MacDougall’s, not only in possession of the castle of Dunollie castle, an ancient stronghold of the MacDougalls, and important [strategically] as commanding the Sound of Mull, Loch Linnhe, and the Firth of Lorn, but had endowed him with an ample estate. The extent of the lands in Lorn thus granted to MacDougall contrasts very remarkably with the limited grant to his eldest daughter out of that lordship, and marks in a very decided manner his respect for the position of male heirs.”

Charter by King James II. to John Stewart, Lord Lorn, of the Lordship of Lorn, and the Baronies of Innermeath and Redcastle.

“dilecto consanguineo nostra Johanni, Domino de Lorn," and the heirs male of his body, lawfully procreated or to be procreated, whom failing to his brother Walter Stewart, and his heirs male, and failing these to his brother Alan, and his heirs male. In default of these, the charter goes on to enumerate the other male relatives to whom the estates should descend â€” viz., John's brothers David and Robert, his uncles Sir Archibald and Sir James Stewart, and his kinsman Thomas Stewart, and the heirs male of each in their turn, as named ; and finally, failing all these, to his heirs whatsoever.”

There was a second Charter to Sir John Stewart of Lorn by King James II., including the lands of Ennerdony, Baldenys, Colndrane, Maw, Coltrane and Kyldeny, in t/ie Barony of Innermeath. ”

By 1452 , there is still no mention of a male heir named Dugald neither in the Deed to the Castle of Dunolly given by John Stewart of Lorn to his brother-in-law John M’Allan V’Coule (MacDougall) of Dunolie or in the two 1452 Charters from King James II to John Stewart.

It is clear from the Dunolly Deed that Sir John Stewart of Lorn was making John M’Coule (MacDougall) the Tutor (guardian) of his male heirs. Sir John Stewart of Lorn son Dugald M’Iain Stewart, who became 1st of Appin married Isabella M’Coule the daughter of his MacDougall tutor and also first cousin, which solidified the Stewart of Appin and MacDougall alliance.

The dates vary for the death of Sir John Stewart of Lorn and the taking of Dunstaffnage Castle by the MacDougall tutor’s renegade grandson Alane M’Coule (MacDougall).

In the Chronicle Domini Jacobi M’Gregor, Dean of Lismore, Notarii Publici ac Decani Lismorensis, qui obiit circiter A.D. 1542/9 is the following sentence stating that John Stewart, Lord of Lorn died Dec. 2 1463.

“â€” 1463, Dec. 2 â€” Obitus Johannis Stewart, Domini de Lorne, apud Dunstaffinicht.”

In the Cambridge University Library there is the original of an “Act of the Scots Parliament”, dated 1460, recommending the King to besiege Dunstaffnage Castle, for the purpose of punishing Alan M'Coule, who had slain the king's kinsman, John Lord of Lorn. In the “Acts of Scots Parliament” among the record of their transactions, in 1464, the following can be found:

“â€” item as tueching ye puniciouft of Alane M'Coule quhilk as cruelyft flayn John lord lorn ye kinge cufing The lorde thinke fpeidfull yt alffoun as ye feffion of ye wedd afkis ye king mowe jn propir pfone wt his lorde for ye jnwadfg juftifing and punyffing of ye faide alane and affegeing of ye caftell of Dunftafnich and yt he be furthwith put to ye horfi of party and fyne oplly put to ye kinge home And yt nocht winding ye Ires writti of befor to ye Erle of Rof The lorde ordanis yt new Ires be writtine baith be autorite of ye king and of pliament chargeing hym yt he nothir fupple fupport nor refett ye faide Alanein ye faide dede, vnd all ye heaft pait charge ze quiet z juri agayn ye kinge maiestete."

It is therefore certain, from the passages in " Origines Parochiales Scotiae” and the two “Acts of Scots Parliament” that Alane M’Coule took possession of Dunstaffnage Castle after murdering Sir John Stewart of Lorn, sometime between 1460 AD and 1464 AD.

==== Dugald Stewart of Appin I ====
“Dugald Stewart married a daughter of Macdougall of Nether Lorn, the chief of the Clan Macdougall, they had three sons.

1. Duncan, his successor.

2. Alan, who succeeded Duncan.

3. Robert, who died without legitimate issue. His Appin heirs use the surname MacRaibert.

Duncan Stewart, eldest son of Dugald Stewart, first of Appin, succeeded his father in the land of Appin on his death in 1497. At this time the Western Highlands and Islands were much disturbed by the attempts of the representatives of the old Lords of the Isles to revive their pretensions to independent power. James IV., who was born in 1473, and succeeded his father in 1488, made frequent journeys to the West Highlands, and thus became acquainted with Duncan of Appin, who was a bold and energetic man. The King recognized him as his kinsman, appointed him to the office of King's Chamberlain of the Isles, and bestowed on him large grants of lands, which will be enumerated hereafter.”

The first and only primary source record of “Dougal Stewart” is after his death, in this charter from King James IV which indicates he is deceased before 1500.

"Charter by King James IV. to Duncan Stewart, son and heir of Dougal Stewart of Appin, in life-rent, of the lands of Coule (Dougall) of Durroure, Ardsell, Lagyn-hall, Auchincan, Auchindarach, Auchinblare, Bellecaulis, and Glencowyn."

The Stewart of Appin tradition that Dugald MacLaurin came from Ardveich, Strathearn and fought his way to became Stewart of Appin I, must be addressed, because of its influence on both clans history. The traditional story also misdirects the actual place of origin of Dougal's McLaurence kindred.

In "The Tale of Leper John and the Campbell Acquisition of Lorn" by Steve Boardman, he describes a manuscript that originated with highland seanachies that describes Dugald as the Leper Lords eldest son Dugald. The first names of Dugald's younger brothers are not given in this manuscript from 1634.

The manuscript certainly raises the consideration that Dugald was the legitimate son of Sir John Stewart all along, since Dugald apparently had younger brothers. Boardman also wrote that the 1880 "The Stewarts of Appin" account is the same as the 1885 Campbell version.

Boardman was mistaken, there is no mention of McLarens in the 1885 Campbell account. Below are Boardman’s comments and the 1756 transcript.

"manuscript, which, based upon internal references, was apparently written in 1634, based upon the writings of highland seanachies’ sometimes to be keeped in Abbeys. The manuscript was copied in 1756 and kept in the British Museum. The manuscript was printed in 1885 as a part of "Records of Argyll: Legends, Traditions, and Recollections of Argyllshire Highlanders" by Lord Archibald Campbell. This is the same manuscript that is quoted in "The Stewarts of Appin" by J. and D. Stewart, published in 1880"

"Here may be opened to your Lop’ [magnifying glass] an ocean of discourse, in case your Lop’ [examination] would be pleased to take the pains to write Highland affairs, as the decay of great sorte his house changed for his eldest son, Dugald, by the Stewarts of Innermeath to the Campbells, who keep it this day; and how the M'Dougalls did keep it ten successions, nine lawfull and one bastard; and how this Lipper Lord [Sir John Stewart] was slain by the Bastard M'Dougal, and how the Stewarts [Appin] did kill the M'Dougal again [Alan of the Wood, Battle of Leachada]; and in end, with how many varieties and troubles it came to this Earl [Campbell] who was in and compelled to give the Stewarts satisfaction, as the indenture betwixt this Earl and Walter [Stewart], Lord Innermeath, doth bear, dated August 1469, "

==== The Rock of the Wicked Resolution ====
There is an 1824 article titled “The Rock of the Wicked Resolution” found in the "Literary Gazette and Journal", Traditions of The Western Highlands No. VIII, 24 April 1824. The traditional account only gives us Dugalds first name with no mention of his place of origin. However, it does tell of Dugald and his family ‘sailing from the East’.

“John Stewart, Lord of Lorne, when far advanced in life, was a widower, and had three daughters, but no lawful son. By a woman above the common rank, named Maclaurin, he had an illegitimate son, whose name was Dugald. He was a young man of great promise, and had particularly distinguished himself on a recent occasion.

The sons of the chief of Macdougall, by the sister of Lord Lorne, were very desirous of marrying their cousins, the co-heiresses of Lorne, and were assiduous in their attention to their uncle, who resided in the castle of Dunstaffnage, once inhabited by the kings of Caledonia, and still one of the royal palaces of Scotland. They had passed the night at Dunstaffnage, and departed early next morning. But they had not gone far on their way, when they observed a number of boats approaching from the east, crowded with people, with pipes playing, and bearing flags. They found that these boats contained Dugald and his mother; and they soon discovered that old Lord Lorne had resolved to marry the mother of Dugald, and that they were now coming to celebrate the marriage. According to the Scotch law, this marriage would have made Dugald legitimate, and capable of inheriting the ample territories of Lorne. This event would have utterly disappointed the matrimonial schemes of the two nephews, and they instantly formed a dreadful resolution to prevent it. They returned, and asked admittance into the castle; but the doorkeeper remarking a very fierce expression in their countenances, first consulted his master, who was displeased at his hesitating to admit his nephews. The doorkeeper reluctantly received them ; they forced their way into Lord Lorne's apartment, and instantly put him to death, to prevent the intended marriage. The brothers were however disappointed in their expectations,—the heiresses escaped from Dunstaffnage by night, and carried away the charters of the estate. They took refuge with the Earl of Argyle, who soon married the eldest daughter; the second was married to Campbell, of Glenurchy, ancestor of the Earl of Breadalbane; and the third to Campbell, of Ottar. -

This murder was committed towards the end of the 15th century. The rock where the two Macdougalls stood when they discovered the approach of Dugald and his mother, and where they resolved to return and assassinate their uncle, is still well known. It is called in Gaelic by a name which, translated, means The Rock of the Wicked Resolution.”

The Maclaurin lady of common rank who sailed from the east on Loch Etive, was perhaps the daughter of vicar Laurence Comedini circa 1420, or one of his Maclaurin kindred at nearby Kilbodan, Ardchattan, a stones' throw from John Stewart of Lorn at Dunstaffnage Castle. Instead, of a McLaren lady from Ardveich, Loch Earn sixty miles away.

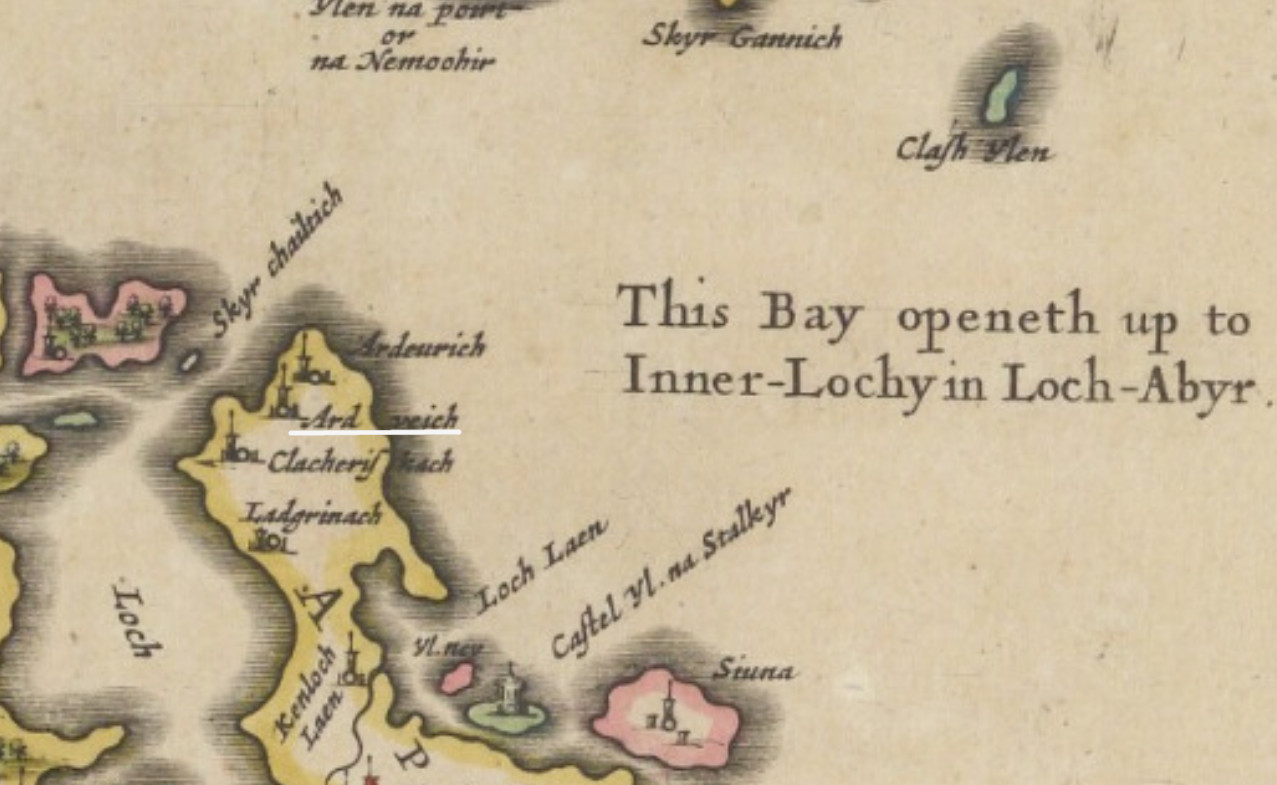
Ardveich in Lorn by Bleau 1645

For what it is worth, there is also an ‘Ardveich’ in Appin, on the Aird’s Peninsula, just a few miles north of Dunstaffnage Castle the home of the murdered Sir John Stewart of Lorn. This 1645 map of Scotland by Bleau clearly places a potential Dugald McLaurin’s Ardveich on the north side of the inlet to Loch Creran in Appin directly across from the north tip of Lismore.

=== 17th century and Civil War ===
The Clan Stewart of Appin supported the royalist, James Graham, 1st Marquess of Montrose at the Battle of Inverlochy (1645), the Battle of Auldearn and the Battle of Kilsyth. After James VII was deposed in 1688, the Stewarts of Appin supported the deposed House of Stuart.

==== Battle of Killiekrankie ====
“It has been doubted whether the Stewarts of Appin took part in the battle of Killiecrankie or Roinn Rhuari as the Highlanders call it Lord Macaulay says that the Stewarts of Appin who though full of zeal had not been able to come up in time for the battle were among the first who arrived after it. This statement however is not quite correct but the mistake may have not unnaturally arisen from the circumstance that a considerable body of the Stewarts joined the Highland army two days after the battle and this fact being mentioned by Drummond of Bathaldie in his memoir of Sir Ewen Cameron Lord Macaulay and other historians have erroneously concluded that no part of the clan had any share in the victory. But before passing sentence of attainder upon the chief men engaged in Dundee's rising the Scots Parliament examined witnesses to prove the complicity of the accused. Among these was Lieut James Colt who deposed that he had been taken prisoner by Dundee and carried by him to Inverlochy and that he saw a young man who was said to be Stewart of Appin join Dundee between Lochaber and Badenoch with a hundred and thirty men of his own with him. James Malcolm became King's evidence and deponed that he saw Stewart of Appin join Dundee in Lochaber with a company of men who had colours. The helmet worn by Robert Stewart of Appin at Killiecrankie is still in possession of Dugald Stuart of Lochcarron one of the family of Ballachelish."

=== 18th century and Jacobite risings ===
A gold saltire on a blue field as flown by Stewart of Appin's regiment at the Battle of Culloden.

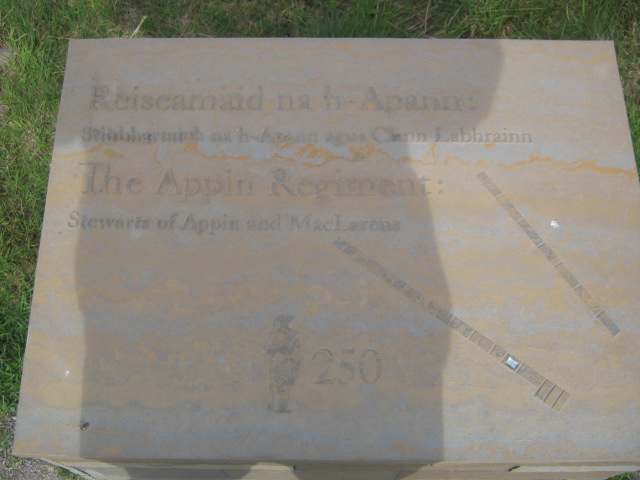
Clan Stewart of Appin regiment marker at the site of the Battle of Culloden

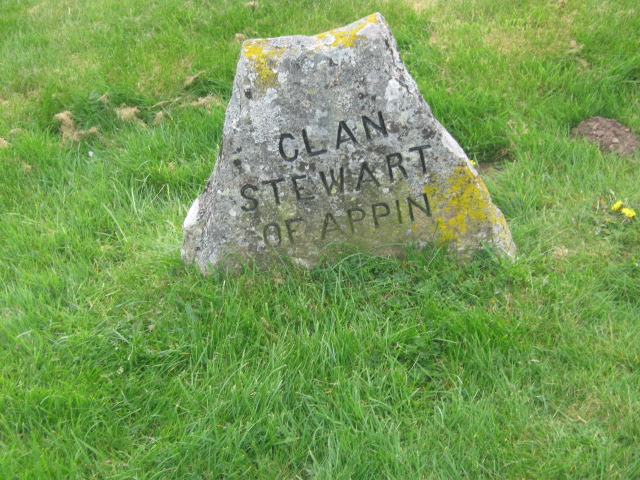
Clan Stewart of Appin grave marker at the site of the Battle of Culloden

Appin naturally supported the Jacobite risings and sent men to fight in the Jacobite rising of 1715. General Wade's report on the Highlands in 1724, estimated the clan strength at 400 men. Dugald Stewart, 9th Chief of Appin, was created Lord Appin in the Jacobite peerage on 6 June 1743. Appin also sent men to fight in the Jacobite rising of 1745. At the Battle of Culloden in 1746, the Appin Regiment suffered 92 killed and 65 wounded out of a fighting force of approximately 300. Ardsheal later escaped Scotland to meet his family in Europe where he spent the rest of his days.

==== Ardsheal's Cave ====
On 23 July 1745, Prince Charles Edward Stuart (Bonnie Prince Charlie) landed on the white sands of the Outer Hebridean island of Eriskay, accompanied only by a small band of companions known as the "Seven Men of Moidart." This was the start of his claim to the Scottish and English throne and the second Jacobite uprising; on 16 April 1746 the Jacobite cause was finally put to rest at the battle of Culloden. Charles Stewart of Ardsheal, one of the Prince's commanding officers, hid from the British Red Coats in a cave as they searched up and down the country for those involved. This place was henceforth known as Ardsheal's Cave. Sitting on a steep hillside at grid reference NN008562 above Kentallen Bay in Loch Linnhe on the West coast of Scotland, between Oban and Fort William, the cave is no more than forty minutes scramble from the loch side.

The Stewarts of Ardsheal were the second most important cadet family of the Stewarts of Appin, second only to the Stewarts of Invernahyle. Totally loyal to the Jacobite cause, Stewart of Ardsheal led the regiment raised by the Stewarts of Appin at Culloden. They suffered appalling casualties when breaking the ranks of Barrell's and Munro's regiments of foot of the Hanoverian army. However the outcome of Culloden was almost certain before it began. The Jacobite army, tired, hungry, improperly equipped and grossly out numbered were decisively defeated. After their victory the English, led by the Duke of Cumberland, were ordered to execute all the Jacobite wounded and imprisoned. For this he was hereafter known as "The Butcher". Having escaped death both in battle and the immediate aftermath Stewart of Ardsheal made for his family seat, Ardsheal House, Kentallen Bay. His hope was that if he could evade capture for long enough some sort of amnesty or deal would eventually be struck. Nevertheless, none of the Jacobites in this predicament could imagine the determination and ruthlessness of Cumberland.

Over the coming months 3,500 Jacobites were rounded up and imprisoned; of these 120 were immediately executed (mainly clan leaders) and a further 90 died in prison. 1,000 were transported to the colonies and 250 "banished". 700 disappeared, their fate unknown. In addition the clan system was destroyed with the Act of Proscription, they were disarmed and the kilt and tartan banned. It was in this climate that Ardsheal returned home and knowing full well his fate, should he be caught, immediately went into hiding. He wanted to be near his wife and new born son so with her help he hid in the cave above his house. His wife would bring food and occasionally he would venture out under cover of darkness.

Eventually the Red Coats came and Ardsheal House was cordoned off and his wife and child held prisoner. She gave nothing away, claiming that she hadn't seen or heard of her husband since he left with the Jacobite army, so the Red Coats thoroughly searched the surrounding area whilst Ardsheal himself was hiding under their noses. One account states that on two occasions they walked within yards of his hideout.

The cave Ardsheal hid in was uniquely situated for this purpose, as it lies behind a tall waterfall which completely hides the entrance (especially when the burn is in flood). As the cave cannot be seen from even five yards away, the hiding place can only be found if the searcher knows of its existence. The depth of the cave is between 15 and 20 feet, it is tall enough to stand up in though the height of the cave tapers down to two to three feet at the very back. The only way to enter the cave is by climbing up the steep sided burn. This combination of factors made the cave an excellent hiding place, as long as the searchers did not know it existed. The only way out of the cave is the only way in, making escape impossible if Ardsheal was found. Another factor that would have made escape difficult were the searchers on the trail, is the noise of the waterfall drowning out all footsteps and other approaching sounds. While the cave was a good hiding place to avoid detection almost indefinitely, Charles Stewart of Ardsheal had a reputation as a strong fighter and proficient swordsman. It has been speculated that he may have been impatient to leave, in order to fight his pursuers.

The threat of capture for Charles Stewart of Ardsheal continued long after the Red Coats had left Ardsheal House. If it wasn't an English soldier who turned him in it was more likely to be a fellow Scotsman particularly from the South. The Jacobite cause was to put a catholic King back on the throne, this was considered by many as taking a step backwards. For the Lowland Presbyterians the defeat of the Jacobites was a cause for celebration. The Union and the Presbyterian system of church government were safe. Realising that no amnesty was ever likely to be forthcoming Ardsheal eventually fled to France and his lands were forfeited to the Crown. His son Duncan Stewart of Ardsheal succeeded in having the lands restored later in the eighteenth century and the Stewarts of Ardsheal then succeeded to the Chiefdom of Appin upon the extinction of the Appin family.

==== Appin Murder ====
Appin was the site of the infamous Appin Murder of 1752, when Colin Roy Campbell of Glenure, 'the Red Fox' – who had been placed as government factor of the forfeited Stewart lands in Appin – was shot in the back by an unknown sniper while riding along the shore of Loch Leven at Ballachulish. Although termed a 'murder' by a Campbell/Hanoverian court, the assassination of a land agent responsible for ordering mass evictions would not have been an uncommon occurrence in the 18th century British Isles. Whoever the shooter may have been, after the chief suspect, Alan Breck Stewart, made his escape, the half-brother of the chief, a cadet named James of the Glens was charged with the murder, tried by a Campbell jury in the Campbell stronghold of Inveraray presided over by MacAilein Mòr himself, and, perhaps not surprisingly, was convicted and hanged on the shore of Loch Leven at Cnap a-Chaolais in Ballachulish. The consensus at the time and the general opinion of historians has been that James Stewart had nothing to do with ordering the shooting. The incident was made famous by Robert Louis Stevenson, the plot of whose novel Kidnapped incorporated the death of Glenure. As an interesting postscript many have tried to identify the shooter but without success. The identity is known within the Chief's family and when asked the current Chief stated that he had read and heard every theory and that none were close to being correct. The "mystery" continues.

== The Daoine Uaisle ==
The daoine uaisle (Gaelic: noble people), as they were known into the 18th century, are synonymous with the term "Tacksmen" and the modern designation of "cadet". These were and are the gentry of the clan (all clans incorporated these positions). Normally related in one form or another by birth to the chief, these men controlled areas, or "tacks", within the greater clan lands. Rents were collected in various forms and rents from the daoine uaisle were in turn paid to the Chief within some clans, and not in others. The primary "Cadets" of Appin are Ardsheal, Achnacone, Fasnacloich, Invernahyle, and Strathgarry. The major branches of Appin stem from the sons of Alan Stewart, 3rd of Appin. Originally they comprised John, 1st of Strathgarry, Dugald, 1st of Achnacone, James, 1st of Fasnacloich and Alexander, 1st of Invernahyle. Ardshiel, the branch our Chief hails from, was given to John, 1st of Ardshiel by his father, John Stewart, 5th of Appin. Andrew Francis Stewart of Lorn, Appin and Ardsheal, 17th of Appin & 12th of Ardsheal, the current Chief of Appin is descended from Charles Stewart, 7th of Ardsheal who ascended as Chief upon the death of Dugald Stewart, our 10th Chief, who died without sons in 1769. Today Andrew Francis Stewart holds the title of both "Appin" (denoting the chief) and Ardsheal.

== Adherents and clansmen ==
The Adherents or "septs" (a modern term) of Appin stem from families that lived in Lorn prior to the Stewarts gaining the Lordship and the clan coalescing. These were/are:

- The MacColls, who descended from Black Solomon, son of Coll, son of the Lord of the Isles,
- The MacLeays or Livingstones (anglicized from MacLeay), who were reported to be on Lismore in 1130, but whose heritage is so old that no one really knows their beginnings,
- The MacGillemichaels, or their anglicized form "Carmichael", are also so old that we can only guess. It is known that they were present in Appin prior to the 13th century.
- The Combichs descended from a family nickname from north Appin (occasionally anglicized as Thomson) and
- The MacRobbs were/are actually Stewarts, descending from Robert, son of Dugald, 1st of Appin.
- The MacInnes, originally from the area of Morvern, settled in the area in the early 15th century. Adherents included/include the MacLaurins, Carmichaels, MacCombichs, MacColls, MacGillemichaels, McIlmichaels, MacInness, MacLeays, MacMichaels, McMichael and MacRobbs (related by blood to the Stewarts).

== See also ==
- Scottish clan
- Clan Stewart
- Stewart of Balquhidder
- Clan Stuart of Bute
