= Appin Murder =

Murder in 1752 near Appin, Scotland

Coordinates: 54.895°N 2.934°W

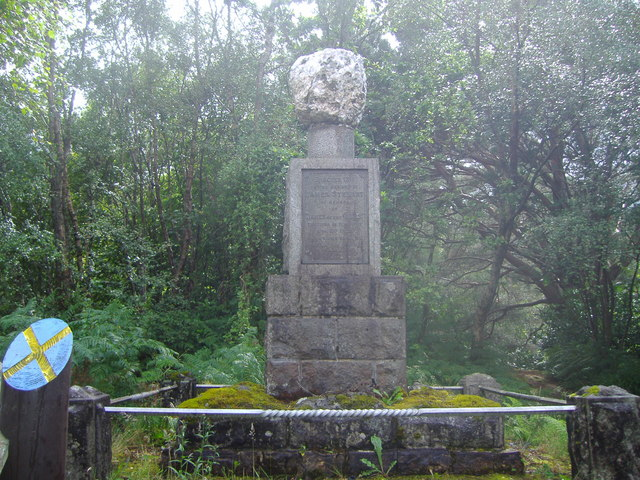
A memorial to James Stewart of the Glen, who was wrongly convicted and executed for the Appin Murder

The Appin Murder (Scottish Gaelic: Murt na h-Apainn) was the assassination, by a concealed marksman, of Colin Roy Campbell, the Clan Campbell tacksman of Glenure and factor for the Forfeited Estates Commission, on 14 May 1752. The murder, which took place on the confiscated estate of Clan Stewart of Appin in Lochaber in the west of Scotland, was an act of violent resistance against the large scale clearances taking place on the estate during the aftermath of the Jacobite Rising of 1745. The assassination led to the trial and execution of James Stewart of the Glens, often characterized as a notorious miscarriage of justice. The murder also inspired events in Robert Louis Stevenson's 1886 novel Kidnapped and its sequel Catriona.

== Victim ==
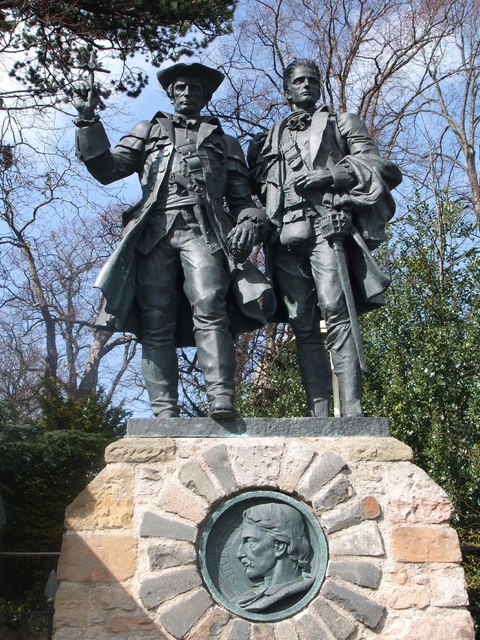
Statue of Allan Stewart (left) and the fictional David Balfour (right), from Robert Louis Stevenson's Kidnapped, on Corstorphine Rd in Edinburgh

Colin Roy Campbell of Glenure (Scottish Gaelic: Cailean Ruadh Caimbeul, Cailean Glinn Iubhair) (1708-1752), nicknamed "The Red Fox" (Scottish Gaelic: an t-Sionnach Ruadh), was the government-appointed factor to the forfeited lands of the Clan Stewart of Appin and Clan Cameron. In the aftermath of the rising of 1745 and in violation of dùthchas, the principle that clan members had an inalienable right to live in their clan's territory, Campbell had ordered several mass evictions of members of Clan Stewart and their replacement by members of Clan Campbell. On 14 May 1752, while on the way to another mass eviction, Campbell was shot in the back by a marksman in the wood of Lettermore near Duror.

Robert Louis Stevenson's fictionalised version of the assassination depicts Colin Campbell accompanied by his nephew Mungo Campbell, a lawyer, who are both on horseback and a large detachment of red-coats on foot. In reality, eyewitness accounts reveal Colin Campbell had only three companions and that all were mounted. They were Mungo Campbell, the Sheriff of Argyllshire, and a servant, William MacKenzie, who had retraced their steps to retrieve a dropped coat belonging to the Sheriff. After a single shot was heard by the remaining witnesses, Colin Campbell slouched on his horse and cried out "Oh, I am dead! Take care of yourselves!" Mungo Campbell, riding close by his uncle, sighted a figure on a hill at some distance, in dark clothing and carrying a musket.

Following a Reformed funeral, Colin Roy Campbell was laid to rest at Ardchattan Priory.

Shortly before his assassination, Colin Roy Campbell had become important to what 21st-century Celticist Robert Dunbar has termed, "the eighteenth century Golden Age" of Scottish Gaelic literature. His name was mentioned in former Jacobite Army military officer and Scottish Gaelic national poet Alasdair MacMhaighstir Alasdair's famous Anti-Whig satire An Airce. In the poem, which satirizes the Aisling, or dream vision poetry then being composed in Munster Irish, the ghost of a beheaded Jacobite appears and prophesies that his Campbell clansmen will soon be punished with a second great flood on their lands for committing high treason against their lawful king, except for a list of those whom the Ghost considers to be honourable Campbells who were to be welcomed aboard a new Ark. Ironically, Colin is one of the few Campbell Whigs for whom the ghost confesses a certain respect:

Ge toil leam Cailean Glinn Iubhair B' fheàrr leam gu 'm b' iubhar 's nach b' fheàrna; Bho 'n a threig e nàdur a mhuinntreach, 'S gann a dh' fhaodar cuim thoirt dà-san. Cuir boiseid de ionmhas Righ Deorsa, De smior an òir mu theis-meadhon; 'S ìobair e 'Neptun ge searbh e, Mur grad-ainmich e 'n righ dlighneach.	"Though Colin of Glenure I much esteem, Would that he was not alder but true yew; Since he forsook the allegiance of his sires, To be reprieved is not his due. "A girdle of the treasure of King George Of finest gold around his middle fling, And to Neptune offer him, though hard, Unless at once he name the rightful King".

== Trial ==
The search for the killer targeted the Clan Stewart. The chief suspect, Alan Breck Stewart (Scottish Gaelic: Ailean Breac Stùibhart) having fled, James Stewart of the Glens (Scottish Gaelic: Seumas a' Ghlinne Stùibhart), the de facto chief of Clan Stewart, was arrested two days later. As "chief of the kindred" until either the return from exile of his half brother, Charles Stewart of Ardsheal, or the coming of age of his nephew, Duncan Stewart of Ardsheal, James Stewart was prosecuted for murder by Lord Prestongrange in a trial dominated by the pro-Hanoverian Clan Campbell: the chief (Scottish Gaelic: MacCailein Mòr) Archibald Campbell, 3rd Duke of Argyll was the presiding judge and the 15-man jury contained a majority of Campbell clansmen. Although the trial testimony showed that James had a solid alibi and was miles away during the shooting, he was found guilty "in airts and pairts" (as an accessory, or an aider and abetter, before the fact, as the concept of being an accessory to murder after the fact does not exist under Scots law).

James Stewart was hanged on 8 November 1752 on a specially commissioned gibbet above the narrows (Scottish Gaelic: Caolas Mhic Phadruig, lit. "MacPatrick's Narrows") between Loch Leven and Loch Linnhe at Ballachulish, and nearby what is now the south entrance to the Ballachulish Bridge. He died after protesting his innocence and lamenting that people of the ages may think him capable of a horrid and barbarous murder.

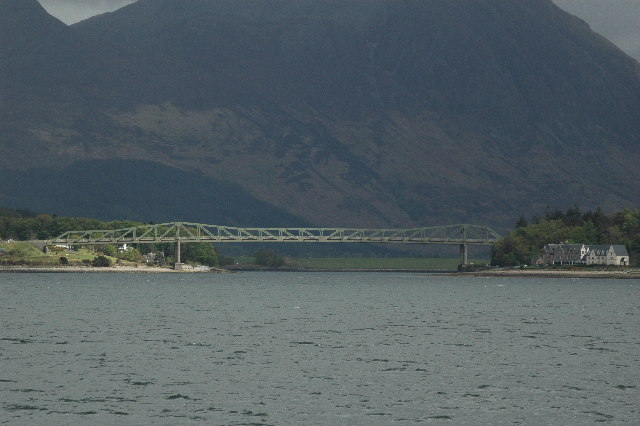
Ballachulish Bridge

Before mounting the scaffold, James of the Glens, who was described at the time as a "decent, God-fearing Highlander", also drew upon the tradition of exclusive psalmody in Reformed worship in the Gàidhealtachd and sang the Metrical version of the 35th Psalm in Scottish Gaelic:

False witnesses rose; to my charge things I not knew they laid. They, to the spoiling of my soul, me ill for good repaid. ~Psalm 35

To this day in the Highlands, Psalm 35 remains known as "The Psalm of James of the Glens" (Scottish Gaelic: Salm Seumas a' Ghlinne).

Similarly to the usual practice after the hanging of pirates, James of the Glens' corpse was left hanging at what is now the south end of the Ballachulish Ferry for eighteen months as a warning to other Clans with rebellious intentions. Over those months, it was beaten and battered by winds and rain. As it deteriorated, his skeletal remains were held together with chains and wire.

== Recent scholarship ==
In Walking With Murder: On The Kidnapped Trail (2005), Ian Nimmo examined the mystery of who shot Colin Campbell with the assistance of retired police Detective Inspector Les Liney, who helped by applying modern police methods to the documents, including two post-mortem reports, relating to the case.

Ian Nimmo explained, however, "Everyone thought that the bullets came from high on the hillside because of evidence from Mungo Campbell - Colin's nephew - saying that he saw a figure there with a gun going away from him. But the position of the bullets suggests they were fired from lower down, by an assassin on one knee in a nearby depression who could be out of sight in the trees in 10 seconds. We believe that the person on the hill was an observer, who left as soon as the job was done."

Furthermore, according to journalist Senay Boztas, "There was one shot but two wounds to Glenure's body because two bullets were loaded into the same gun barrel, the second called a 'wanderer' – (Scottish Gaelic: fear siubhail) – as it was less accurate. Both exited his body, suggesting they were fired from close range, and from low on the hillside, according to Liney's analysis."

According to Nimmo, Alan Stewart did not pull the trigger, and the secret of who did has been handed down in the oral tradition to at least 20 local descendants of Clan Stewart over more than 250 years. Ian Nimmo chose not to reveal the shooter's name, stating, "it is not mine to give away".

In 2001, Amanda Penman, an 89-year-old descendant of the Clan Chiefs of the Stewarts of Appin, alleged the murder had been planned by four young Stewart tacksmen without the sanction of James of the Glens. There was a shooting contest among them and the assassination was committed by the best marksman among the four, Donald Stewart of Ballachulish. According to the local oral tradition, the actual shooter desperately wanted to turn himself in rather than allow James Stewart to hang and had to be physically held down, on James' orders, to prevent this. It was felt within the Clan that the real killer was not strong enough to withstand a grueling interrogation by Mungo Campbell without also naming his fellow conspirators. Several years after James's execution, when the body was finally returned to Clan Stewart for burial, Donald Stewart of Ballachulish and his family were assigned the duty of washing the bones before the Reformed funeral. Penman's allegations are supported by the local oral tradition, which has long held that Donald Stewart of Ballachulish, rather than Allan Breck or James of the Glens, was responsible.

In Culloden and the Last Clansman, his 2001 book length biography of James of the Glens and examination of the case, historian James Hunter also concluded that James Stewart did in fact order the assassination of Colin Roy Campbell. James Stewart acted, according to Hunter, to prevent the imminent mass eviction of Stewart clan members from Duror and their replacement by Campbell tenants, as well as other large scale estate clearances planned for the very near future. Hunter argued that by ordering the contract killing of a government estate factor, James Stewart was defending what he saw as the best interests of Clan Stewart of Appin, seeking to preserve as much of the inheritance of his nephew, Duncan Stewart of Ardsheal, as possible, and following the code of honour traditionally demanded of a Scottish clan chief despite fully knowing what the consequences would be.

Ironically, according to Hunter, the assassination of Colin Roy Campbell took place at a watershed moment in Scottish history. Many other "Highland gentlemen" were on the verge of abandoning their ancestral code, Jacobitism and their heritage language in favour of either emigration to the American colonies or assimilation into the upper class found in the rest of the country. The latter choice often involved becoming landlords for profit and, in many cases, ordering large scale clearances of their own clan members and distant relatives. Following James' execution, large scale evictions continued anyway as did voluntary emigration to new communities like Stewartsville, Scotland County, North Carolina and in other parts of the Highland Scottish diaspora.

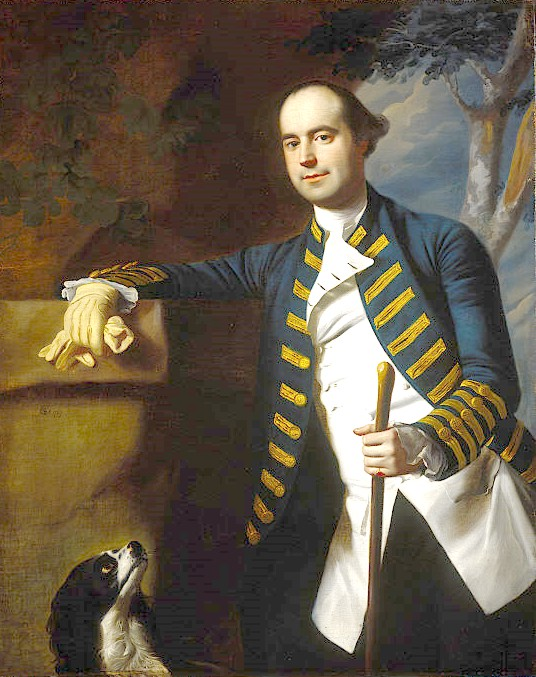
Portrait of Duncan Stewart of Ardsheal by John Singleton Copley.

Ownership of the estate was restored to Duncan Stewart of Ardsheal, James' nephew, who had emigrated to the Colony of Connecticut, and fought at great personal cost as a Loyalist during the American Revolution, in 1785 and the leases of the remaining Campbell tenants were quietly bought out. Large scale estate clearances continued, however, and even escalated due to the high profits promised by large scale sheep farming. At the same time, Hunter concluded that James Stewart of the Glens, in acting as he was convicted and hanged for having done, "was not acting ignobly."

== Alternative theory ==
In 2016, Allan MacInnes, an academic at the University of Strathclyde and historian Mhàiri Livingstone expressed a belief that, rather than being a conspiracy by members of Clan Stewart of Appin, the murder was far more likely to have been committed by the victim's nephew, Mungo Campbell. Mungo Campbell was the only witness and inherited his uncle's position as estate factor for the Crown, which both historians said was a consistent motive based on what is known of his personality. Most crucially, Mungo Campbell took charge of the investigation into his uncle's assassination and routinely used excessive force while interrogating witnesses and suspects, which would have allowed him the opportunity to deflect suspicion from himself. However the theory is yet to be proved.

== Recent legal developments ==
There was an attempt to gain a pardon for James of the Glens. In 2008, Glasgow lawyer John Macaulay asked the Scottish Criminal Cases Review Commission to reconsider the case on the grounds his study of the trial transcripts shows there was "not a shred of evidence" against Stewart. but was denied due to the case being so old it was not in the interest of justice. In 2015, the Scottish government said it would not proceed with a pardon.

== Literature ==
- In Robert Louis Stevenson's novel Kidnapped, which he described as based on the local oral tradition surrounding the case, the Red Fox's death is depicted as unauthorized and against the wishes of James Stewart. Allan Breck, who earlier in the novel has expressed his intense hatred for The Red Fox, confides following the assassination in the novel's protagonist, David Balfour, that he would never have killed Colin Roy Campbell, "in my own country", as such an act would bring trouble upon the whole clan. Even so, despite both James of the Glens and Alan Breck learning the real shooter's identity almost immediately and the urging of David Balfour to surrender the killer, who is a relative of both Gaels, for criminal prosecution, Balfour is angrily told to hold his tongue. Allan Breck instead goes on the run with Balfour in order to deflect suspicion away from the real killer.
- Stevenson's sequel novel, Catriona, picks up immediately after its predecessor had ended. Seeking to prove James and Alan's innocence, David Balfour makes a statement to a lawyer and goes to the trial's prosecutor William Grant of Prestongrange, the Lord Advocate, to press the case for James' innocence. However, his attempts fail, as David is once again kidnapped to keep him from testifying, and held on the Bass Rock, an island prison in the Firth of Forth, until the trial is over and James has been condemned to death. As is still alleged to have happened in the oral tradition of Appin, James of the Glens willingly chooses to face trial by "a jury of Campbells", while never breaking the code of silence and carrying the name of the actual assassin of Colin Roy Campbell with him to the grave.

== See also ==
- William Grant, Lord Prestongrange the chief prosecutor.
- Keppoch murders
