= Kidnapped (novel) =

1886 novel by Robert Louis Stevenson

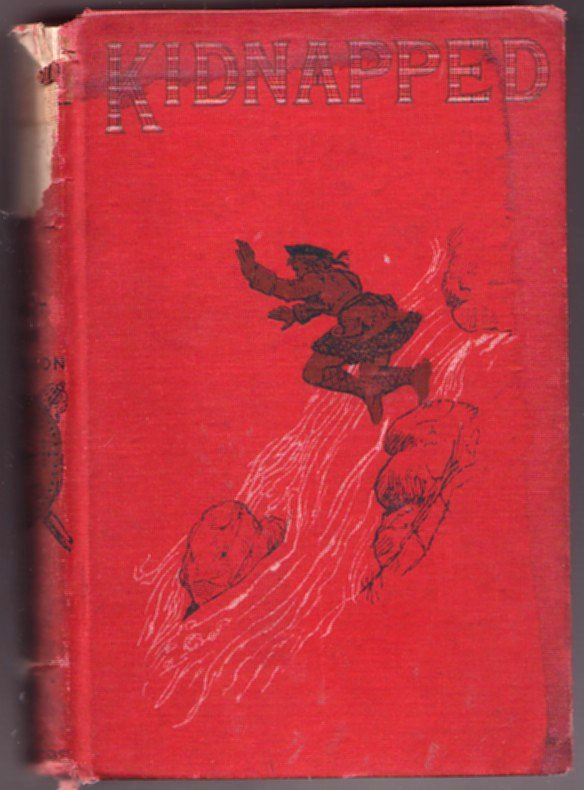
- First American edition, New York: Scribner's Sons, 1886
- Author: Robert Louis Stevenson
- Language: Victorian era Scottish English, Lowland Scots, Highland English
- Genre: Adventure novel Historical novel
- Publisher: Cassell and Company Ltd.
- Publication date: 1886
- Publication place: Scotland
- Pages: 136
- OCLC: 43167976
- Dewey Decimal: 823/.8 21
- LC Class: PR5484 .K5 2000
- Followed by: Catriona (1893)

Kidnapped is a historical fiction adventure novel by Scottish author Robert Louis Stevenson, written as a boys' novel and first published in the magazine Young Folks from May to July 1886. The novel has attracted the praise and admiration of writers as diverse as Henry James, Jorge Luis Borges, and Hilary Mantel. A sequel, Catriona, was published in 1893.

The narrative is written in English with some dialogue in the Lowland Scots language.

Kidnapped is set around real 18th-century Scottish events, notably the "Appin Murder" and the Highland Clearances, which occurred in the aftermath of the Jacobite rising of 1745. Many of the characters are real people, including one of the principals, Alan Breck Stewart. The political situation of the time is portrayed from multiple viewpoints, and the Scottish Highlanders are treated sympathetically.

The full title of the book is Kidnapped: Being Memoirs of the Adventures of David Balfour in the Year 1751: How he was Kidnapped and Cast away; his Sufferings in a Desert Isle; His Journey in the Wild Highlands; his acquaintance with Alan Breck Stewart and other notorious Highland Jacobites; with all that he suffered at the hands of his Uncle, Ebenezer Balfour of Shaws, falsely so-called: Written by Himself and now set forth by Robert Louis Stevenson.

== Plot ==
The novel opens in the (fictional) village of Essendean in the Ettrick Forest area of the Scottish Lowlands in 1751. The main character and narrator is 17-year-old (Note: David is described as sixteen in the first edition, but Stevenson later amended this to seventeen.) David Balfour whose sole remaining parent, his father, has recently died. The minister of Essendean, Mr. Campbell, hands David a sealed letter left by his father with instructions that it be delivered to his father’s brother, Ebenezer, at his family's ancestral estate, the House of Shaws in Cramond. Mr. Campbell tells David that he believes the letter may well prove to be advantageous to him.

After two days' walk cross country, David arrives at the ominous House of Shaws. There he is confronted by the paranoid Ebenezer with a loaded blunderbuss. His uncle is miserly, living on "parritch" and small ale, and the House of Shaws itself is partially unfinished and somewhat ruinous. David is allowed to stay and soon discovers evidence that his father may have been older than his uncle, thus making David the rightful heir to the estate. Ebenezer asks David to get a chest from the top of a tower in the house but refuses to provide a lamp or candle. David is forced to scale the stairs in the dark and by sudden luck of lightning illuminating the night scene discovers that not only is the tower unfinished in some places, but the steps simply end abruptly and fall into an abyss. David concludes that his uncle intended for him to have an "accident", perhaps so as not to have to give over his nephew's inheritance.

David confronts his uncle, who promises to address the matter the next morning. A ship's cabin boy, Ransome, arrives the next morning and tells Ebenezer that Captain Hoseason of the brig Covenant needs to meet him to discuss business. Ebenezer takes David to a pier on the Firth of Forth, where Hoseason awaits, and David makes the mistake of leaving his uncle alone with the captain while he visits the shore with Ransome. Hoseason later offers to take them on board the brig for a drink and a brief tour, and David complies, only to see his uncle returning to shore alone in a skiff. David is then immediately struck senseless.

David awakens, bound hand and foot, in the hold of the ship, and learns that per arrangement with David's uncle, the captain plans to sell him into indentured servitude in the Carolinas. But the ship encounters contrary winds, which drive her back toward Scotland. Fog-bound near the Hebrides, they strike a small boat. All of the small boat's crew are killed except one man, Allan Breck Stewart, who is brought on board and offers Hoseason a large sum of money to drop him off on the mainland. David later overhears the crew plotting to kill Alan instead. David and Alan barricade themselves in the roundhouse, where Alan kills the murderous helmsman and David wounds Hoseason. Alan then demonstrates his superior fighting skills as he easily kills five more men and intimidates the remaining crew into backing down.

Hoseason has no choice but to give Alan and David passage back to the mainland. David tells his tale to Alan, who in turn states that his birthplace, Appin, is under the tyrannical administration of Colin Roy of Glenure, the King's factor and a Campbell. Alan, who is a Jacobite agent and wears a French uniform, vows that should he find the "Red Fox" he will kill him.

The Covenant tries to negotiate a difficult channel without a proper chart or pilot and is soon driven aground on the notorious Torran Rocks. David and Alan are separated in the confusion, with David being washed ashore on the isle of Erraid, near Mull, while Alan and the surviving crew row to safety on that same island. David spends a few days alone in the wild before getting his bearings.

David learns that his new friend has survived, and David has two encounters with beggarly guides: one who attempts to stab him with a knife, and another who is blind but an excellent shot with a pistol. David soon reaches Torosay, where he is ferried across the river, receives further instructions from Alan's friend Neil Roy McRob, and later meets a catechist who takes the lad to the mainland.

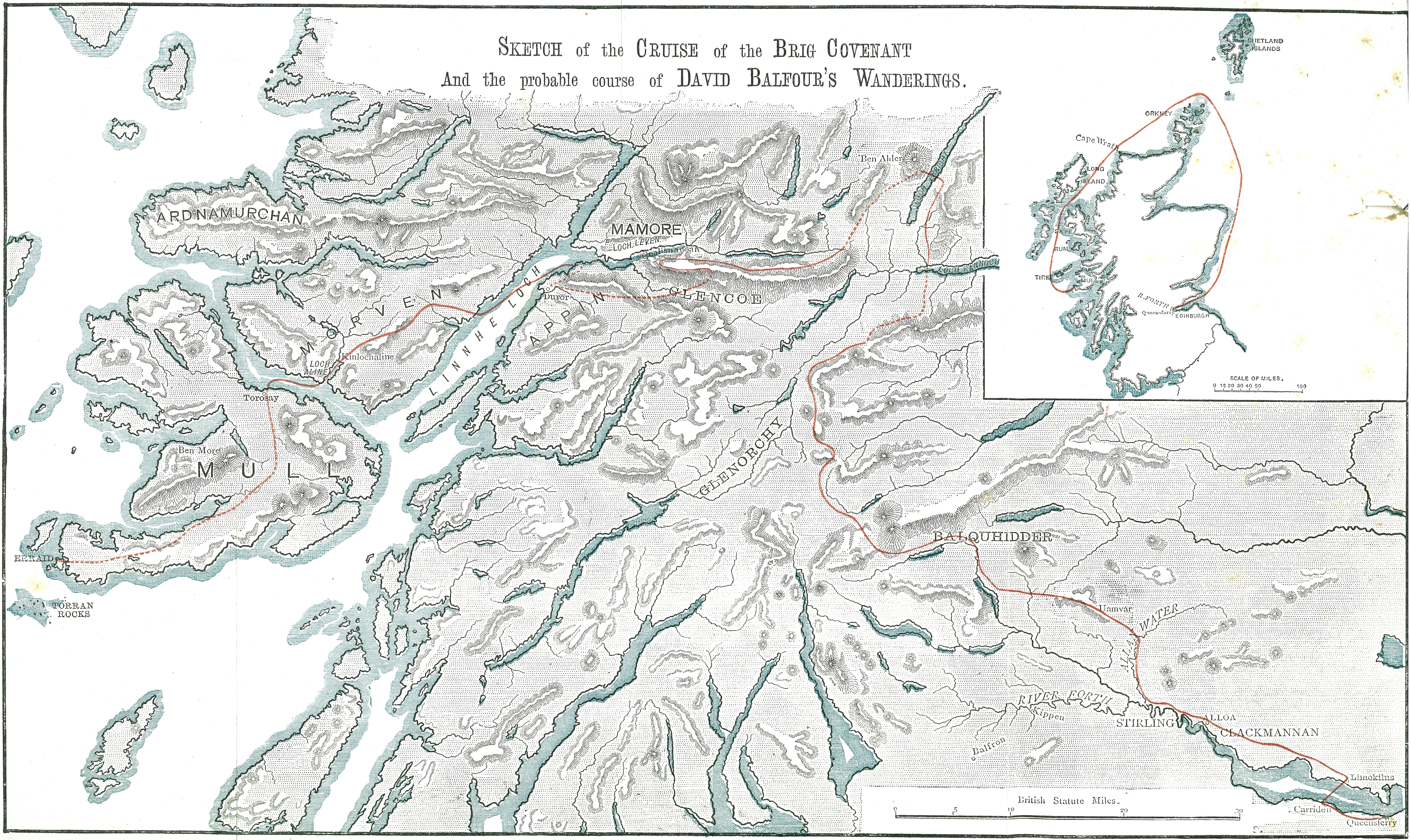
Kidnapped sketch of route of ship and David's walk across Scotland

As he continues his journey, David encounters none other than the Red Fox, Colin Roy Campbell himself, who is accompanied by a lawyer, a servant, and a sheriff's officer. When David stops the Campbell man to ask him for directions, a hidden sniper kills the King's hated agent.

David is denounced as a conspirator and flees for his life, but by chance reunites with Alan. The youth believes Alan is the assassin, but Alan denies responsibility. Alan and David then begin their flight through the heather, hiding from government soldiers by day. As the trek drains David's strength, his health rapidly deteriorates; by the time they are set upon by wild Highlanders who are sentries for Cluny Macpherson, an outlawed chief in hiding, the lad is barely conscious. Alan convinces Cluny to give them shelter, and David is tended by a Highland doctor. He soon recovers, though in the meantime Alan loses all of their money at cards with Cluny, only for Cluny to give it back when David practically begs for it.

When David and Alan resume their flight in cold and rainy weather, David becomes ill again, and Alan carries him on his back down the burn to reach the nearest house, fortuitously that of a Maclaren, Duncan Dhu, who is both an ally of the Stewarts and a skilled piper. David is bedridden and given a doctor's care, while Alan hides nearby, visiting after dark.

In one of the most humorous passages in the book, Alan convinces an innkeeper's daughter from Limekilns (unnamed in Kidnapped but called "Alison Hastie" in its sequel) that David is a dying young Jacobite nobleman, despite David's objections, and she ferries them across the Firth of Forth. There, they meet a lawyer of David's uncle's, Mr. Rankeillor, who agrees to help David properly claim his inheritance. Rankeillor explains that David's father and uncle had once quarrelled over a woman, David's mother, and the older Balfour had married her, informally giving the estate to his brother to settle their dispute while living as an impoverished schoolteacher with his wife. This agreement had lapsed with his death.

David and the lawyer hide in bushes outside Ebenezer's house while Alan speaks to him, claiming to be a man who found David nearly dead after the wreck of the Covenant and says he is representing folk holding him captive in the Hebrides. He asks David's uncle whether Alan should kill David or keep him. The uncle flatly denies Alan's statement that David had been kidnapped but eventually admits that he paid Hoseason "twenty pound" to take David to "Caroliny". David and Rankeillor then emerge from their hiding places, and speak with Ebenezer in the kitchen, eventually agreeing that David will be provided two-thirds of the estate's income for as long as his uncle lives.

The novel ends with David and Alan parting ways on Corstorphine Hill; Alan returns to France, and David goes to a local bank to receive his money.

== Characters ==
- David Balfour is 17 and his parents have died. He seeks his inheritance from his father's brother. The last name of this character is taken from the maiden name of the author's mother.
- Ebenezer Balfour is his uncle, living in the entailed estate.
- Alexander Balfour, father of David and older brother of Ebenezer.
- Alan Breck Stewart is his companion, and is a character drawn from life.
- Colin Roy Campbell, also known as the Red Fox. He meets David at Appin on his walk across Scotland, just before a sniper shoots him dead. The Appin murder mentioned in the story was a historical event followed by a controversial trial.

The character James Stewart was real, and the man hanged for killing Colin Roy Campbell, though James was not the killer.

Cluny MacPherson and Rob Roy MacGregor and his son, Robìn Òig or Young Rob, mentioned or met along the way, were real people.

== Genre ==
Kidnapped is a historical romance, but by the time it was written, attitudes towards the genre had evolved from the earlier insistence on historical accuracy to one of faithfulness to the spirit of a bygone age. In the words of a critic writing in Bentley's Miscellany, the historical novelist "must follow rather the poetry of history than its chronology: his business is not to be the slave of dates; he ought to be faithful to the character of the epoch". Indeed, in the preface to Kidnapped Stevenson warns the reader that historical accuracy was not primarily his aim, remarking "how little I am touched by the desire of accuracy".

Stevenson presents the Jacobite version of the Appin murder in the novel, but sets the events in 1751, whereas the murder occurred in 1752.

== Publication history and author ==
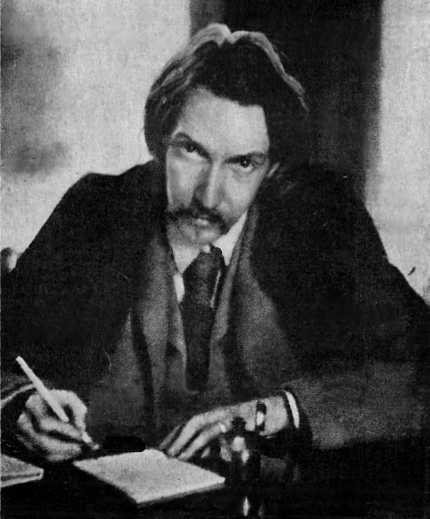
Robert Louis Stevenson at age 35 in 1885

Kidnapped was first published in the magazine Young Folks from May to July 1886, and as a novel in the same year.

Robert Louis Stevenson (1850–1894) planned to write this story as early as 1880. He immersed himself in books on Scotland in the early and middle 18th century in preparation for writing. He was born and raised in Edinburgh, then travelled in England, France and the US. After his father died, he took his wife, children and his own mother as he traveled in search of a place more salutary to his health, finally building a house in Samoa, where he later died at age 44. He wrote Kidnapped on his stay in England.

Stevenson remains one of the most popular and revered writers in the history of the English language, and was extremely prolific. His other works include Treasure Island and Strange Case of Dr. Jekyll and Mr. Hyde.

== Major themes ==
A central theme of the novel is the concept of justice, the imperfections of the justice system and the lack of a universal definition of justice. To David justice means the restoration of his inheritance, whereas for Alan it means the death of his enemy Colin Roy of Glenure.

Literary critic Leslie Fiedler has suggested that a unifying "mythic concept" in several of Stevenson's books, including Kidnapped, is what might be called the "Beloved Scoundrel", or the "Devil as Angel", "the beauty of evil". The Rogue in this instance is of course Alan, "a rebel, a deserter, perhaps a murderer ... without a shred of Christian morality". Good nevertheless triumphs over evil, as in David Balfour's situation.

== Literary significance and criticism ==
Kidnapped was well received and sold well while Stevenson was alive. After his death many viewed it with scepticism, seeing it as simply a boys' novel. By the mid-20th century it had regained critical approval and study. The novel has attracted the praise and admiration of writers as diverse as Henry James, Jorge Luis Borges, and Hilary Mantel.

While it is basically an adventure novel, it raises various moral issues, such as the nature of justice and the fact that friends may have different political viewpoints.

== Sequel ==
A sequel, Catriona, was published in 1893.

== Adaptations ==
The novel has been adapted a number of times, and in multiple media.

Film and television versions were made in 1917, 1938, 1948, 1960, 1968, 1971, 1978, 1986, 1995 and 2005.

An adaptation for the stage by Keith Dewhurst was produced by the Royal Lyceum Theatre Company, Edinburgh in August 1972, with Paul Young as David Balfour, James Grant as Alan Breck Stewart, and music by Steeleye Span.

A four-part adaptation written by Catherine Czerkawska and starring David Rintoul as David Balfour and Paul Young as Alan Breck Stewart was broadcast on BBC Radio 4 in 1985. A more recent two-part adaptation written by Chris Dolan and starring Owen Whitelaw as David Balfour and Michael Nardone as Alan Breck was broadcast also on BBC Radio 4 in 2016.

Marvel Illustrated published a comic book version in 2007–2008, by Roy Thomas and Mario Gully, who had previously adapted Treasure Island.

In 2023 the National Theatre of Scotland performed a new stage adaptation, which featured Frances Stevenson as narrator and reimagined the relationship between David Balfour and Alan Breck Stewart as a romance.

== Possible inspirations for the plot ==
It has been speculated that the novel was inspired in part by the true story from earlier in the 18th century of James Annesley, heir to five aristocratic titles who was kidnapped at the age of 12 by his uncle Richard and shipped from Dublin to America in 1728. He managed to escape after 13 years and return to reclaim his birthright from his uncle in one of the longest courtroom dramas of its time. Kidnapped does not end in the way Annesley's life story did, as the ship on which the main character was kidnapped never got beyond Scotland, allowing for a rich story of Scotland, highlands and lowlands. Further, a key event in the plot happens when David is present when Colin Roy Campbell falls dead from the unseen murderer's bullet.

Annesley biographer Ekirch felt in his response to a remark in the review of his book that "It is inconceivable that Stevenson, a voracious reader of legal history, was unfamiliar with the saga of James Annesley, which by the time of Kidnapped's publication in 1886 had already influenced four other 19th-century novels, most famously Sir Walter Scott's Guy Mannering (1815) and Charles Reade's The Wandering Heir (1873)." The Scottish author Andro Linklater, who reviewed the book for The Spectator, disagreed with this contention. The author, Robert Louis Stevenson, did not mention the earlier historic event in the novel, nor in his correspondence; instead he names The Trial of James Stewart for the murder of Colin Roy Campbell at Appin as an inspiration, according to his wife.

== Edinburgh: City of Literature ==
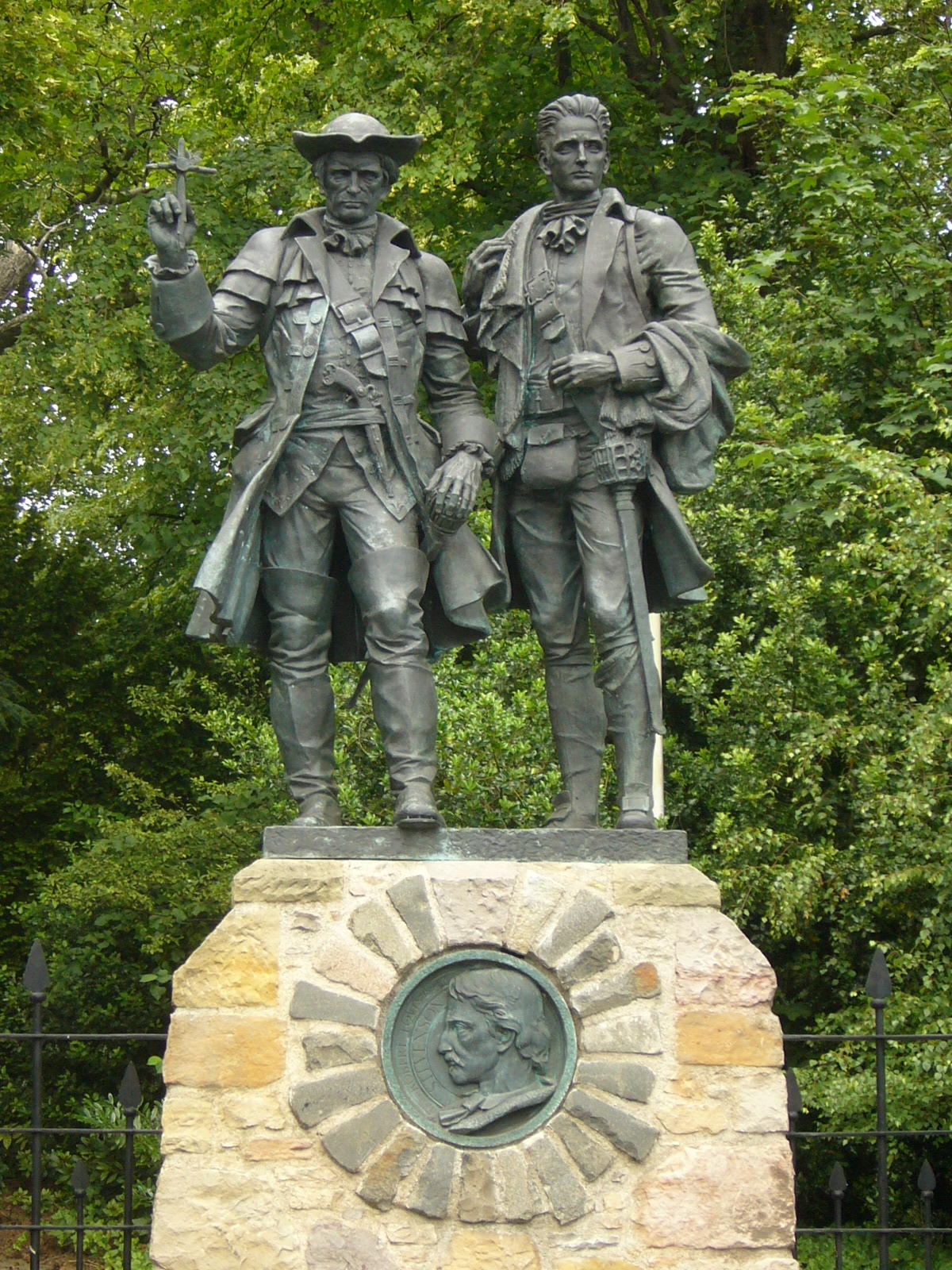
Alexander Stoddart's Kidnapped statue at Corstorphine, Edinburgh, depicting Alan Breck Stewart and David Balfour at their final parting on Corstorphine Hill (unveiled 2004). Breck holds the handmade cross with silver button, cleverly designed to carry a message to an illiterate colleague.

As part of the events to celebrate Edinburgh becoming the first UNESCO City of Literature, three versions of Kidnapped were made freely available by being left in public places around the city. Throughout February 2007, 25,000 copies of the novel were distributed in that way.

A statue honouring Stevenson through a depiction of the two main characters from Kidnapped, Alan Breck Stewart and David Balfour, was unveiled by Sean Connery in 2004 in Corstorphine Road, Edinburgh. The location for the work, which is by Scottish sculptor Alexander Stoddart, is where, in the novel, the two friends part ways.

- A new printing of Barry Menikoff's edition of the novel.
- A retelling of the tale for children.
- A 2007 graphic novel version created by Alan Grant and Cam Kennedy. Translations of the graphic novel were also published in Lowland Scots and Scots Gaelic.

== Bibliography ==
- Beetz, Kirk H (1996). Beacham's Encyclopedia of Popular Fiction. Beacham Publishing. ISBN 978-0-933833-38-8.
- Fiedler, Leslie A. (2009). "R L S Revisited". In Bloom, Harold (ed.). Robert Louis Stevenson. Infobase Publishing. ISBN 978-1-4381-1345-6.
- Mickenberg, Julia; Vallone, Lynne, eds. (2011). "The Problems of Kidnapped". The Oxford Handbook of Children's Literature. Oxford University Press. ISBN 978-0-19970191-9.
- Simmons, James C. (1973). The Novelist as Historian: Essays on the Victorian Historical Novel. Walter de Gruyter. ISBN 978-3-11-139213-4.
