= Art and part =

Term used in Scots law

Art and part is a term used in Scots law to denote the aiding or abetting in the perpetration of a crime, or being an accessory before or at the perpetration of the crime. It results in each person involved in the crime being equally liable for the full offence, regardless of their individual contribution to it. It thus bears some similarities to criminal conspiracy in common law.

Under section 293(1) of the Criminal Procedure (Scotland) Act 1995, a person may be convicted of, and punished for, a contravention of any enactment, notwithstanding that he was guilty of such contravention as art and part only. Subsection (2) says:

(2) Without prejudice to subsection (1) above or to any express provision in any enactment having the like effect to this subsection, any person who aids, abets, counsels, procures or incites any other person to commit an offence against the provisions of any enactment shall be guilty of an offence and shall be liable on conviction, unless the enactment otherwise requires, to the same punishment as might be imposed on conviction of the first-mentioned offence.

== Requirements of art and part liability ==
The accused must have made some kind of contribution or participated in some way to the crime to be liable for the full offence. Simply being present at the scene of a crime is therefore not enough. Contribution can come in the form of psychological assistance, by giving advice or instigating the commission of the crime, or physical assistance, such as driving a getaway vehicle during a robbery.

The accused must have shared a ‘common purpose’ to commit the crime, by being aware of what the other members were doing and voluntarily assisting or participating in carrying out the crime. However, an accused will not be liable for any actions by a co-accused which go unforeseeably beyond the scope of the common purpose. There does not need to be prior agreement to commit the crime: ‘spontaneous coming together’ is enough.

== See also ==
- Legal doublet
- Common purpose, a similar principle under English Law
