= James Stewart of the Glen =

Scottish clan leader

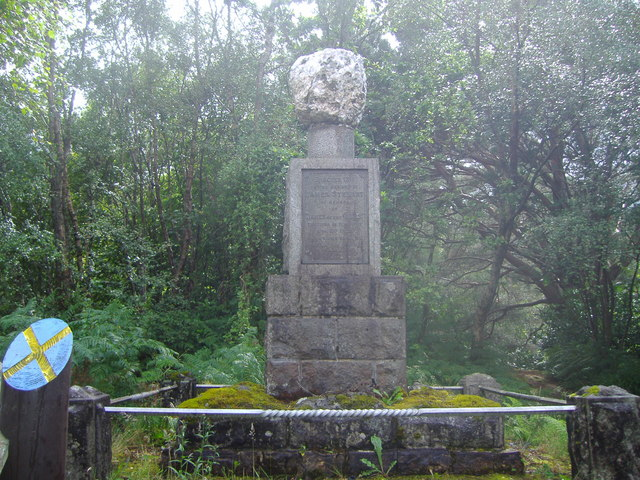
- Seamus a'Ghlinne memorial cairn
- Born: c. 1698
- Died: 8 November 1752
- Cause of death: Hanging
- Other names: James of the Glens; Seamus a’ Ghlinne; James Stewart of Acharn
- Criminal charges: Accessory to Murder
- Penalty: Capital punishment

James Stewart of the Glen, (Gaelic: Seumas a' Ghlinne; c. 1698 - 8 November 1752) also known as James of the Glens, was a leader of the Scottish Clan Stewart of Appin. He was wrongfully accused and hanged as an accessory to the Appin Murder, the assassination of Colin Roy Campbell.

== Appin murder and trial ==
Colin Roy Campbell, a government factor of estates forfeited by pro-Jacobite clans following the Rising of 1745, was shot in the back on 14 May 1752. The search for the killer targeted the Clan Stewart as Campbell had ordered several evictions of members of Clan Stewart. The chief suspect, Alan Breck Stewart having fled, James Stewart of the Glens, the tanist of the Stewarts, was arrested for the crime and tried for the murder in a trial dominated by the pro-Hanoverian Clan Campbell: chief Archibald Campbell, 3rd Duke of Argyll was the presiding judge and the 15-man jury contained Campbell clansmen. Although the trial showed that James was not directly involved in the assassination (he had a solid alibi), he was found guilty "in airts and pairts" (as an accessory; an aider and abetter).

== Execution ==
James Stewart was hanged on 8 November 1752 on a specially commissioned gibbet above the narrows at Ballachulish, now near the south entrance to the Ballachulish Bridge. He died protesting his innocence, lamenting that people of the ages may think him capable of a horrid and barbarous murder. Before mounting the scaffold, he sang the 35th Psalm in Scottish Gaelic:

"False witnesses rose; to my charge things I not knew they laid. They, to the spoiling of my soul, me ill for good repaid." ~Psalm 35

To this day in the Highlands, it remains known as "The Psalm of James of the Glens".

James's corpse was left hanging at the south end of the Ballachulish Ferry for eighteen months as a warning to other clans with rebellious intentions. Over those months, it was beaten and battered by winds and rain. As it eventually deteriorated, the skeletal remains were held together with chains and wire.

== Legacy ==
=== In popular culture ===
Several accounts of the Appin Murder have published since 1752, the most recent being Culloden and the Last Clansman (2001) by Dr James Hunter.

James of the Glen appeared in the novel Kidnapped by Robert Louis Stevenson. James's memorial and Ballachulish are mentioned in Liam McIlvanney's crime novel "The Quaker" by his detective Duncan McCormick who is also from Ballachulish though the novel is set in Glasgow.

=== Recent legal developments ===
There is a movement afoot to gain a pardon for James of the Glens. In 2008, Glasgow lawyer John Macaulay asked the Scottish Criminal Cases Review Commission to reconsider the case on the grounds his study of the trial transcripts shows there was "not a shred of evidence" against Stewart. The petition was denied due to the case being so old it was not in the interest of justice. As of 2010, the application lies with the Scottish Ministers.
