= Aberconway =

Aberconway, the anglicised form of the Welsh placename Aberconwy, may refer to:

- Baron Aberconway, title in the British peerage
- Charles McLaren, 1st Baron Aberconway (1850-1934), Scottish politician and jurist
- Laura McLaren, Baroness Aberconway (died 1933), British suffragist
- Henry McLaren, 2nd Baron Aberconway (1879-1953), British horticulturalist and industrialist
- Charles McLaren, 3rd Baron Aberconway (1913-2003), British horticulturalist and industrialist
- Charles McLaren, 4th Baron Aberconway (born 1948), British peer

== See also ==
- Aberconwy (disambiguation)
- Aberconway House, London, built for the 2nd Baron
- Aberconway Medal of the Geological Society of London, named for the 3rd Baron
