= Charles McLaren =

Charles McLaren may refer to:

- Charles McLaren, 1st Baron Aberconway (1850–1934), Scottish politician and lawyer
- Charles McLaren, 3rd Baron Aberconway (1913–2003), British industrialist and horticulturalist
- Charles McLaren, 4th Baron Aberconway (born 1948), British nobleman
- Charles Stephen McLaren (born 1984), heir apparent to the Barony of Aberconway
- Charles McLaren (psychiatrist) (1882–1957), Australian psychiatrist and missionary

== See also ==
- Charles Maclaren (1782–1866), Scottish editor
