= Priscilla Norman =

British activist and suffragist (1883–1964)

The Honourable Lady Norman CBE JP

Personal details
- Born: Florence Priscilla McLaren; 1883
- Died: 1 March 1964 (aged 80–81)
- Spouse: Sir Henry Norman, 1st Baronet (m. 1907)
- Parents: Charles McLaren, 1st Baron Aberconway (father); Laura Elizabeth Pochin (mother)

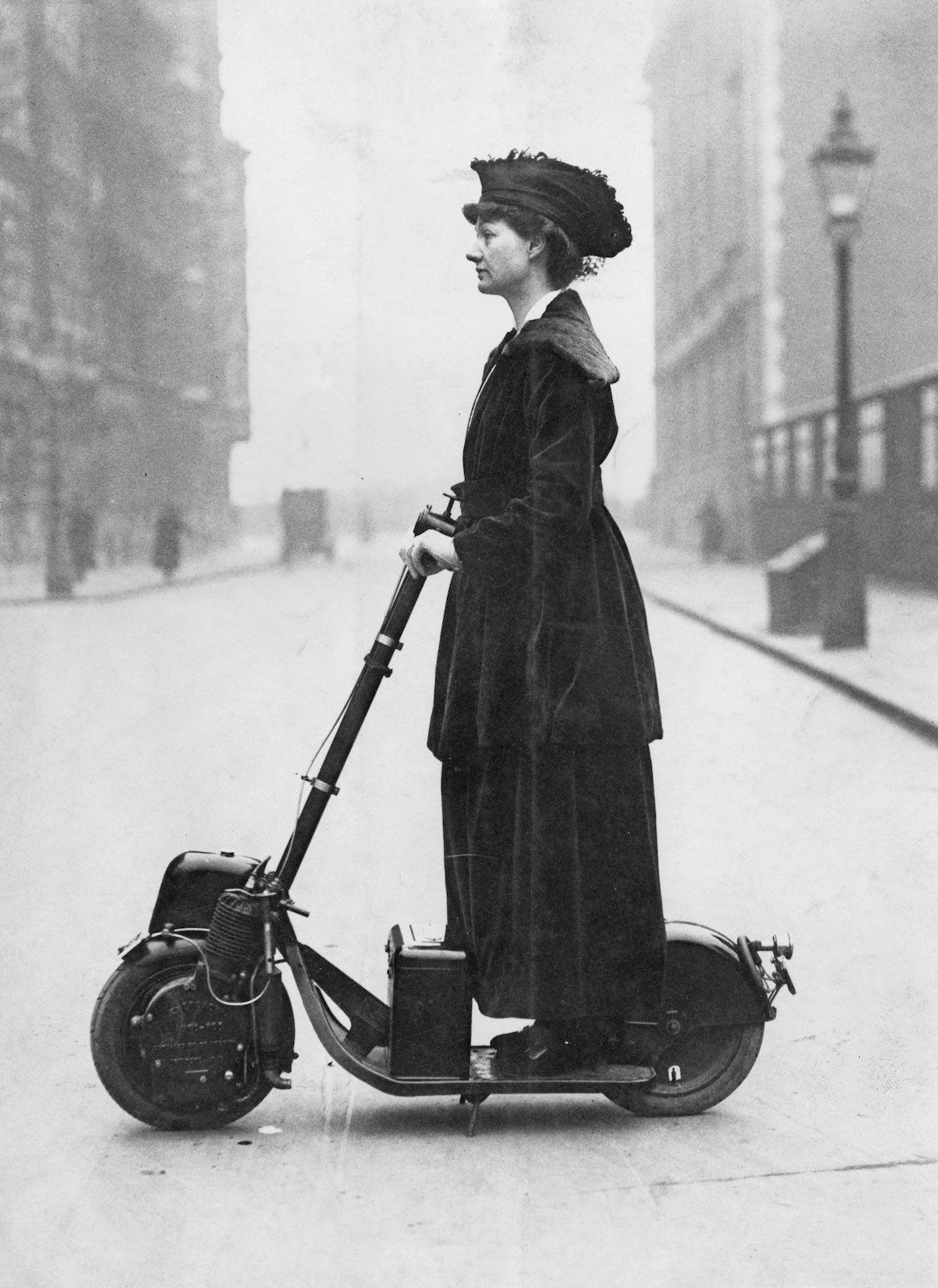
Lady Norman riding her Autoped (motorized scooter) 1916

Florence Priscilla, Lady Norman, CBE, JP (née McLaren; 1883 – 1 March 1964, Antibes) was a British activist and suffragist.

== Background ==
Lady Norman was an active supporter of women's suffrage but not a militant. She held the post of Hon. Treasurer of the Liberal Women's Suffrage Union.

== Family ==
Lady Norman was the fourth child and second daughter of the Liberal politician Charles McLaren, 1st Baron Aberconway and Laura Elizabeth Pochin. Her brothers were the Liberal politicians Henry D McLaren and Francis McLaren.

In 1907 she married, as his second wife, Sir Henry Norman, 1st Baronet, a noted journalist and then Liberal MP for Wolverhampton South, who lost this seat in the first election of 1910 but then gained Blackburn in the second election of that year. Amongst the causes Sir Henry helped promote as a politician was women's suffrage.

== Politics ==
Like her mother, she was active in the cause of women's suffrage through the Liberal Women's Suffrage Union and the Women's Liberal Federation. She was a member of the National Union of Women's Suffrage Societies (NUWSS).

During the First World War, she ran a voluntary hospital, known as 'The British Hospital' in Wimereux, France with her husband. It was at the Hotel Belle Vue, Wimereux and by 1915 had 102 beds. In 1914 she accompanied twenty British Red Cross nurses to France where Dr Grey was in charge of the hospital supported by Matron Mary Foster-Elliot. Lady Norman valued the role of the professional nurse at a time when many aristocrats were more interested in individual volunteering: “Professional 'women have done this work in times of peace, and they should certainly, do it now that war has come, bringing them the most interesting opportunities for public service possible. It is their right.”

Lady Norman was awarded the Mons Star and bar for her services, mentioned in dispatches and in 1917 created a CBE for her war services.

She was involved with the Imperial War Museum (IWM) from its inception in 1917, she was their first female trustee, appointed in 1920. She was chair of one of its subcommittees (the Women's Work Subcommittee) from 1917 and was instrumental in ensuring that the contributions of women during the war were recorded and included in the museum's collections. Her connection with the IWM continued for many years, with the IWM Art Collection moved for safety reasons for storage at Ramster during the Second World War.

With women's suffrage secured Lady Norman became an active member of other, mainly women's issues, organisations. In 1919 she joined the Women’s Advisory Committee of the League of Nations. In 1921 she became a member of the Departmental Committee on Child Adoption and she was active in the National Adoption Society. She was also on the Nuffield Provincial Hospitals Trust later becoming Chair of its Women’s Advisory Council.

In 1922 she became a Justice of the peace for the Children’s Court, London.

Having an interest in mental health issues, she became the first woman to be appointed to the board of the Royal Earlswood Hospital in 1926. She was a board member through its period of transition to a Hospital Management Committee in the National Health Service in 1948 until her resignation in 1961. From 1945 she was the Vice Chair of the newly formed National Association for Mental Health later 'MIND' which she helped found. From 1951 she was on the Boards of Governors for the Bethlem and Maudsley mental health hospitals which both hosted nurse training schools. In January 1965 she wrote a 'Report of visits to Hong Kong and Manila by Lady Norman and Miss Addis, and to Sydney and Melbourne by Lady Norman' for the National Association for Mental Health.

During the Second World War she was a driver for the Women's Voluntary Service in London.

The archives of Lady Norman are held at the Women's Library in London.

== Gardening ==
Like her grandparents who started Bodnant Garden, Priscilla was a keen horticulturist.

When she and her husband acquired Ramster Hall, Surrey she was instrumental in setting out rhododendrons and azaleas in the gardens. The gardens were opened to public view in the very first National Gardens Scheme to support the Queen's Nursing Institute in 1927 and have continued to be opened annually under that scheme.

In 1931 she inherited Château de la Garoupe, Antibes from her mother, continuing to manage and develop the gardens.

She died on 1 March 1964 at the family home in Antibes.

== Sources ==
- French, Patrick (6 January 2011) [2004]. "Norman, Sir Henry, first baronet (1858–1939)". Oxford Dictionary of National Biography (online ed.). Oxford University Press. doi:10.1093/ref:odnb/61020. (Subscription, Wikipedia Library access or UK public library membership required.)
