= Laura McLaren, Baroness Aberconway =

British suffragist, editor (1854–1933)

The Right Honourable The Lady Aberconway CBE, DStJ
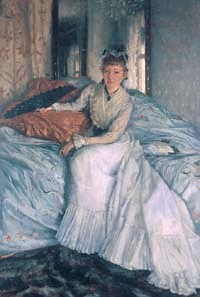
- Born: Laura Elizabeth Pochin; 14 May 1854; Broughton, Lancashire, England
- Died: 4 January 1933 (aged 78); Antibes, France
- Occupations: activist, author, horticulturist
- Notable work: The Women's Charter of Rights and Liberties
- Spouse: Charles McLaren (m. 1877)
- Children: 4 (including Henry, Francis and Priscilla)

Laura Elizabeth McLaren, Baroness Aberconway CBE, DStJ (née Pochin; 14 May 1854 – 4 January 1933) was a British suffragist, author and horticulturalist.

== Life ==
Her birth was registered in the Salford district of Lancashire on 14 May 1854. She was the daughter of Henry Davis Pochin, a noted industrialist and chemist, and his wife, Agnes (née Heap), a leading women's rights activist.

She married the journalist and Liberal MP Charles McLaren, a business associate of her father's, at Westminster on 6 March 1877. Charles McLaren was later created Baron Aberconway. They had four children. Laura McLaren's two sons became Liberal MP's, Henry D. McLaren for the West Staffordshire constituency and, Francis McLaren for the Spalding constituency in Lincolnshire. Francis married Barbara Jekyll, a niece of the famous garden designer Gertrude Jekyll. He was killed in a flying accident in 1917. Her daughter Priscilla, also a noted activist and suffragist, married Sir Henry Norman and, with him, developed gardens at Ramster Hall, Surrey. Laura's other daughter, Elsie Dorothea, married Sir Edward Johnson-Ferguson, 2nd Baronet.

Baroness Aberconway was a campaigner for women's suffrage, founding the Liberal Women's Suffrage Union and publishing some writings on the subject. During World War I, she converted her house in London into a hospital and helped run it.

She died in 1933 at her home, Château de la Garoupe, on the Cap d'Antibes in France.

== Awards and honors ==
In 1918, Aberconway was appointed CBE. She was also appointed Dame of Grace of the Venerable Order of St John.

== Other ==
Outside politics Aberconway was a talented artist and horticulturalist. She and her husband worked to expand and improve the Bodnant Garden begun by her father. Château de la Garoupe is hailed for its beautiful garden. Lady Aberconway also developed the topiary terraces at Golden Grove, Llanasa, another house in North Wales owned by her father.

== Writings ==
- The Women's Charter of Rights and Liberties. London, John Sewell, 1909.
- The Prime Minister and Women's Suffrage London, John Sewell, 1913.

Party political offices
Preceded by Rosalind Howard	President of the Women's Liberal Federation; 1915–1919	Succeeded by Hilda Runciman
