= Ramster =

Coordinates: 51.0916°N 0.6467°W

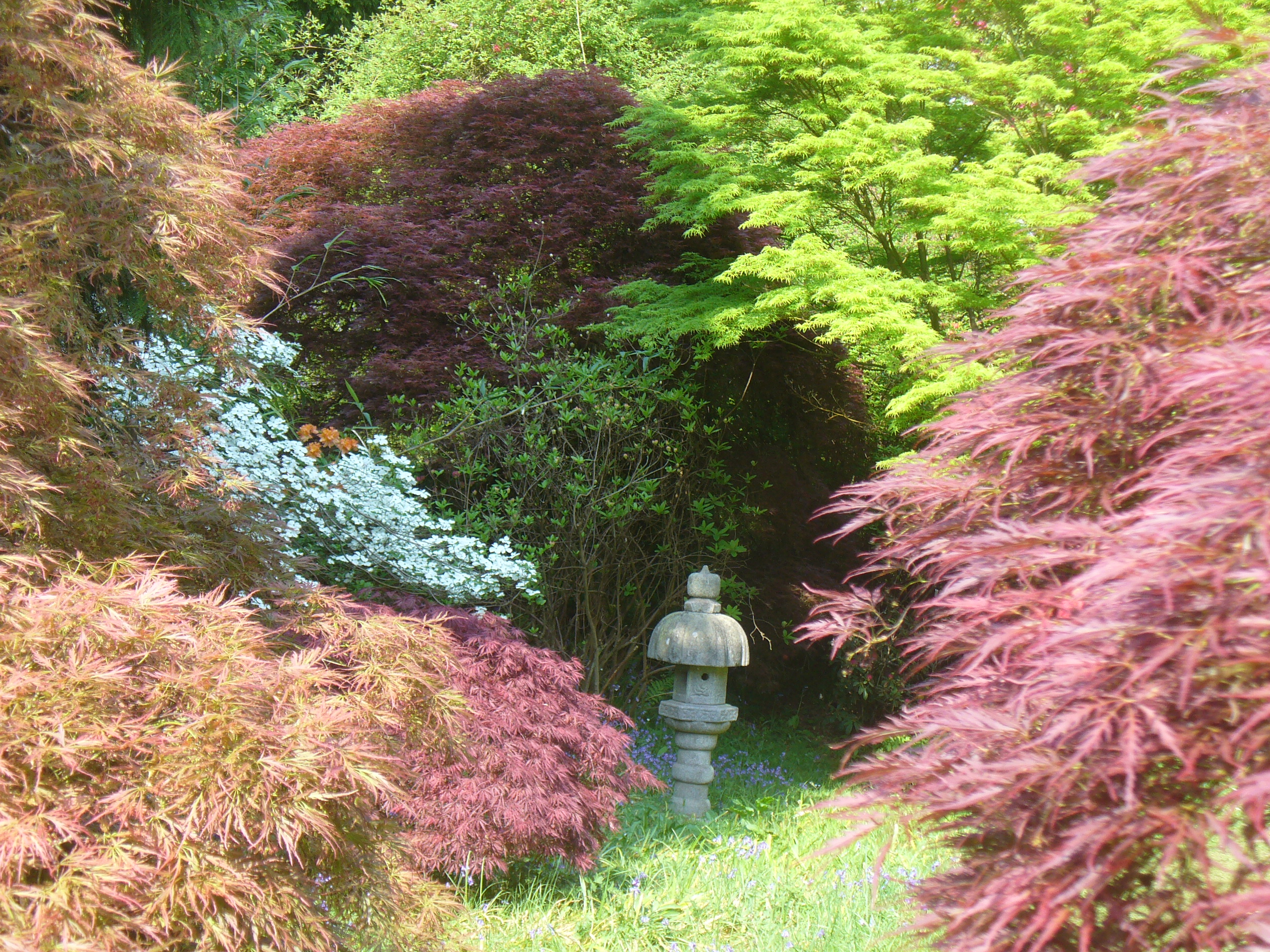
Ramster gardens

Ramster Garden is an open garden, near Chiddingfold, Surrey, covering over 20 acres (81,000 m^{2}). First landscaped and laid out in the 1890s by Gauntlett Nurseries and Sir Harry Waechter.

In 1922, Sir Henry and Lady Priscilla Norman purchased Ramster. Lady Norman came from a family of keen horticulturists. Her grandparents had started Bodnant Garden whilst her mother created Château de la Garoupe, Antibes which was later left to Lady Norman.

Lady Norman was instrumental in setting out rhododendrons and azaleas in the Ramster gardens. The gardens were opened to public view in the very first National Gardens Scheme to support the Queen's Nursing Institute in 1927 and have continued to be opened annually under that scheme.

Ramster was later cared for by their granddaughter Miranda Gunn, and her husband. However Ramster is now shared with their daughter Rosalind Glaister.

The garden features include a flower collections, wooded areas and a woodland walk, and water features.

The house and grounds are also available for private hire for weddings and events.
