= Château de la Garoupe =

Château in Antibes, France

Coordinates: 43°33′0″N 7°8′17″E

The Château de la Garoupe is a château located near Garoupe Beach in Antibes, France.

== History ==
In 1907, British MP Charles McLaren, Baron Aberconway, bought 4 acres (1.6 ha) at the point of the Cap d’Antibes. He hired English architect Ernest George to build the property. It features a long façade with half moon windows and a long stairway leading to the sea. The garden, which was created by his wife, Laura McLaren, Baroness Aberconway, featured a pergola with 12-metre-high (39 ft) rose bushes, irises and begonias.

At times the house was rented or visited by various celebrities, including Cole Porter & Linda Porter, and Pablo Picasso.

The house passed to the McLaren's daughter Priscilla Norman in 1931 where she continued to develop the garden. Her husband, Sir Henry Norman expanded the property and added an extra storey to the house.

In 1999, the home was purchased by Russian tycoon Boris Berezovsky (1946–2013) for €22 million.

Jan Koum, founder of WhatsApp, acquired Château de la Garoupe for about 65 million euros in November 2023.

== See also ==
- List of castles in France
