= John Murray Easton =

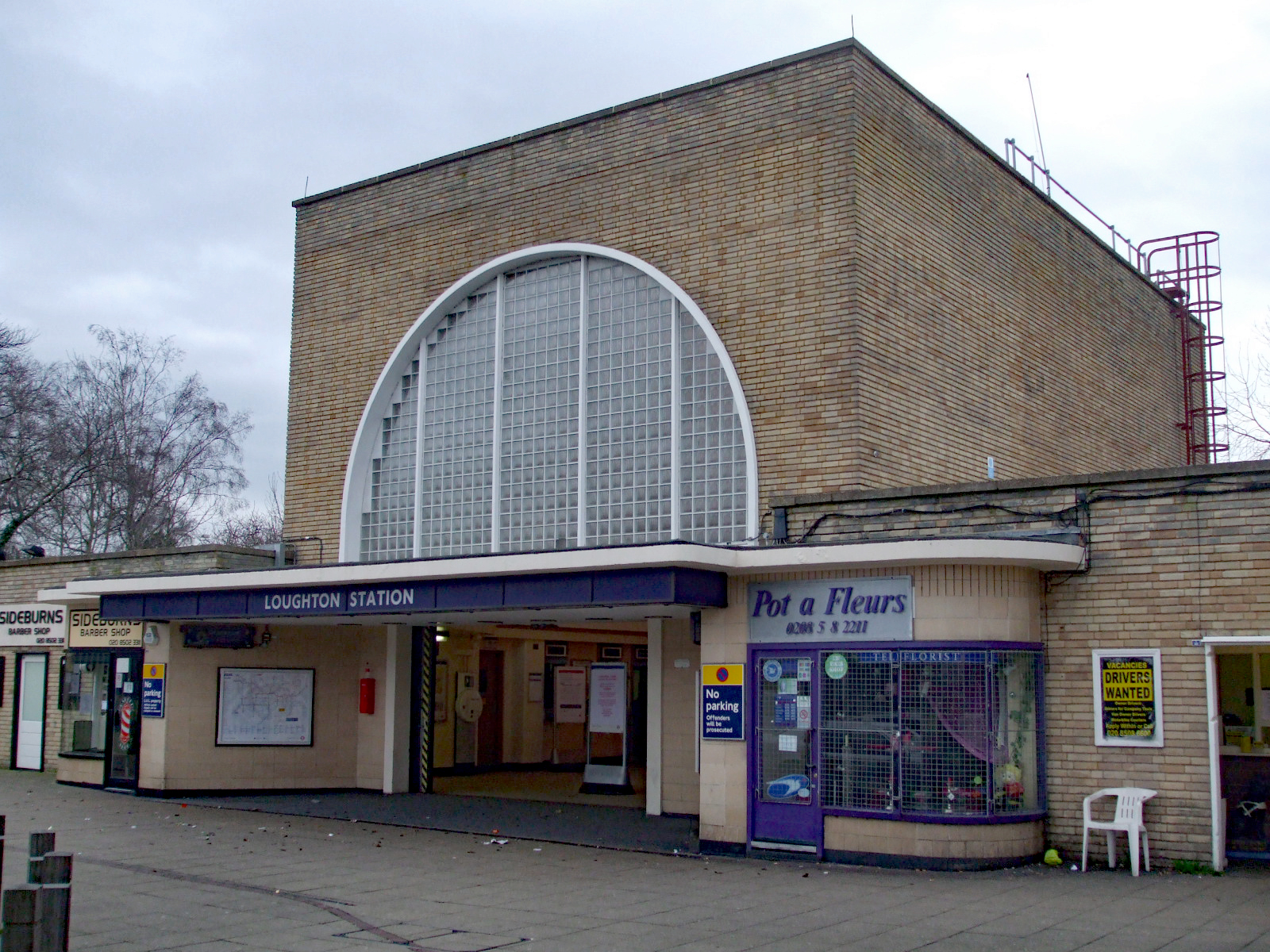
Loughton station building

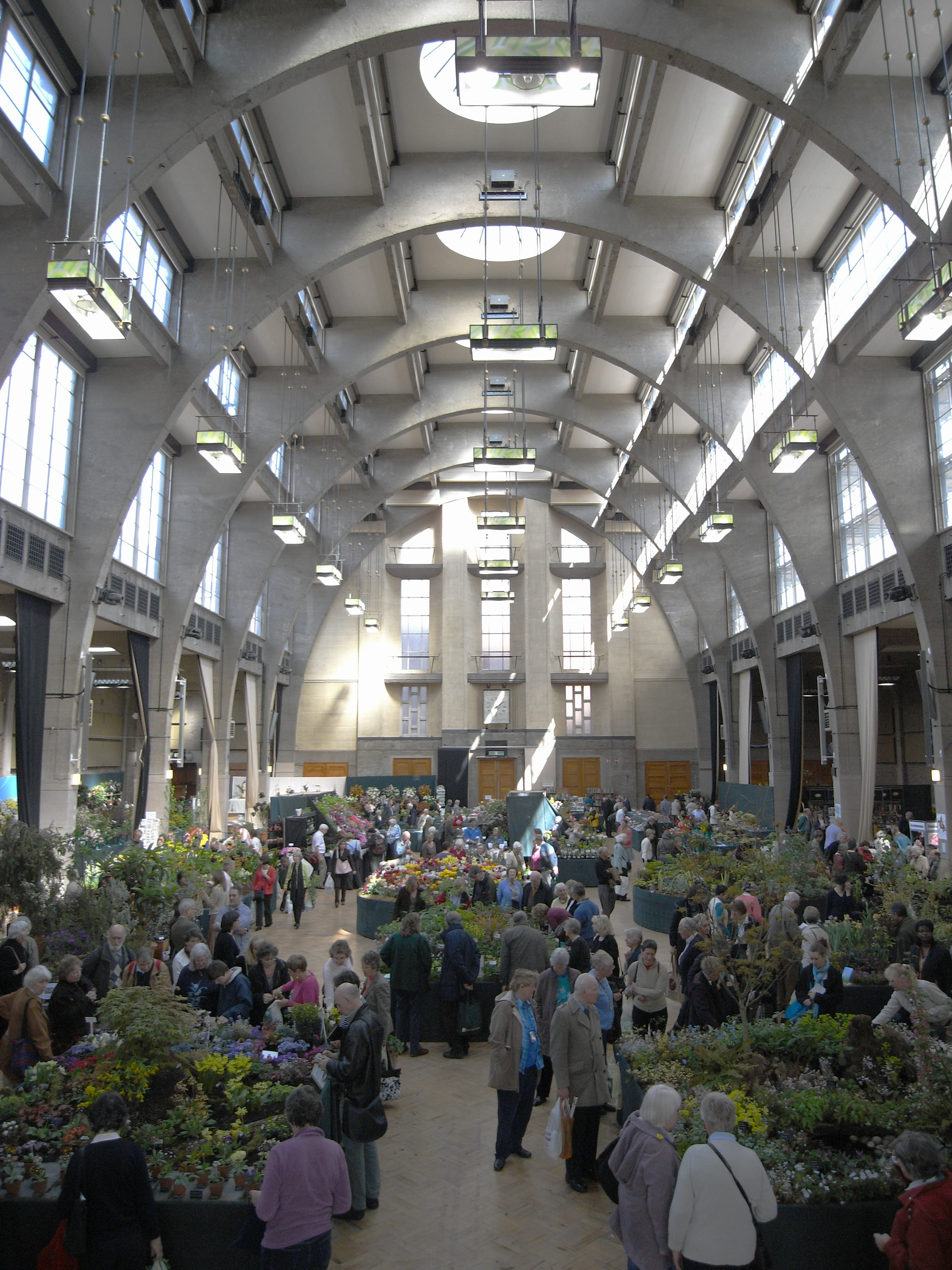
The RHS Lawrence Hall

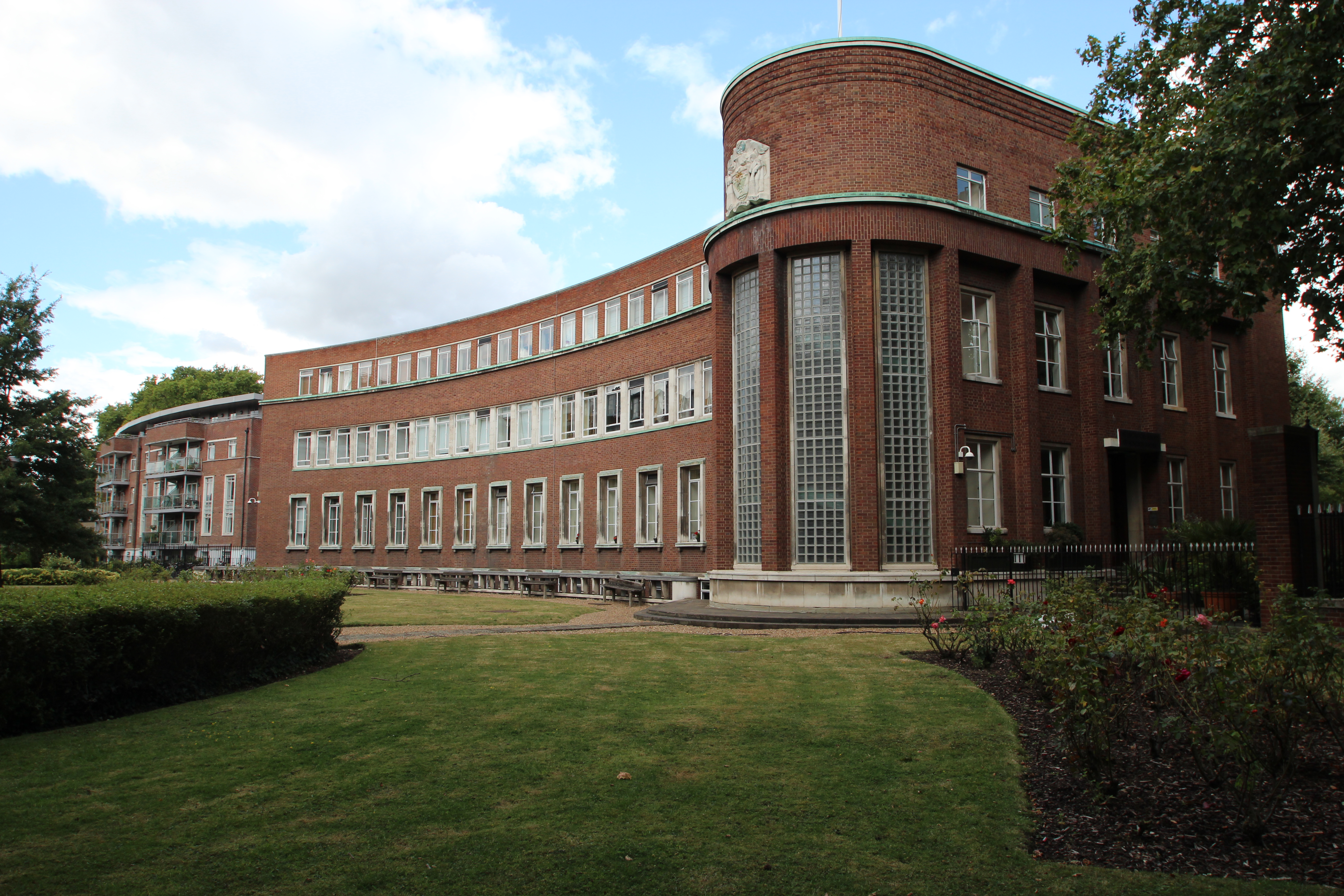
The New River Head Research Building

John Murray Easton (30 January 1889 – 19 August 1975) was a Scottish architect and the winner of the Royal Gold Medal for architecture awarded by the Royal Institute of British Architects.

== Early life ==
Easton was born in Edinburgh on 30 January 1889.

== Career ==
Easton was articled to George Mitchell of Aberdeen in 1905 and studied at Robert Gordon's Technical College. He spent time in France in 1912 after which he moved to London where he studied at University College School of Architecture. At the same time he was an assistant with Granville Edward Stewart Streatfeild, Collcutt & Hamp, Raymond Unwin, and Wimperis & Simpson. He may have served in the military between 1914 and 1916. In 1919 he went into partnership with Howard Morley Robertson at 168 Regent Street, London, and designed a number of buildings with Howard Robertson of that firm. He became an associate of the Royal Institute of British Architects in 1921 and a fellow in 1927.

Easton was the designer of Aberconway House at 38 South Street, Mayfair, London, and Loughton tube station, Essex, a grade II listed building. He also designed the Lawrence Hall of the Royal Horticultural Society, the British Pavilion at the 1939 World's Fair, and the Research Building of the Metropolitan Water Board at New River Head (1938).

He was the winner of the Royal Gold Medal for architecture awarded by the Royal Institute of British Architects.

== Death ==
Easton died in London on 19 August 1975. He is buried at Kensal Green Cemetery.
