= Aberconwy =

Aberconwy (Welsh for mouth of the River Conwy) may refer to:

- Aberconwy (UK Parliament constituency) (2010–2024)
- Aberconwy (Senedd constituency) (2007–)
- Aberconwy, an electoral ward of Conwy town
- Aberconwy Abbey, a Cistercian foundation at Conwy, later transferred to Maenan near Llanrwst
- District of Aberconwy, a defunct administrative division of Gwynedd
- Battle of Aberconwy (1196)
- Treaty of Aberconwy (1277)

== See also ==
- Aberconway (disambiguation), an Anglicised spelling
