= Jan Koum =

American entrepreneur (born 1976)

- Ян Кум
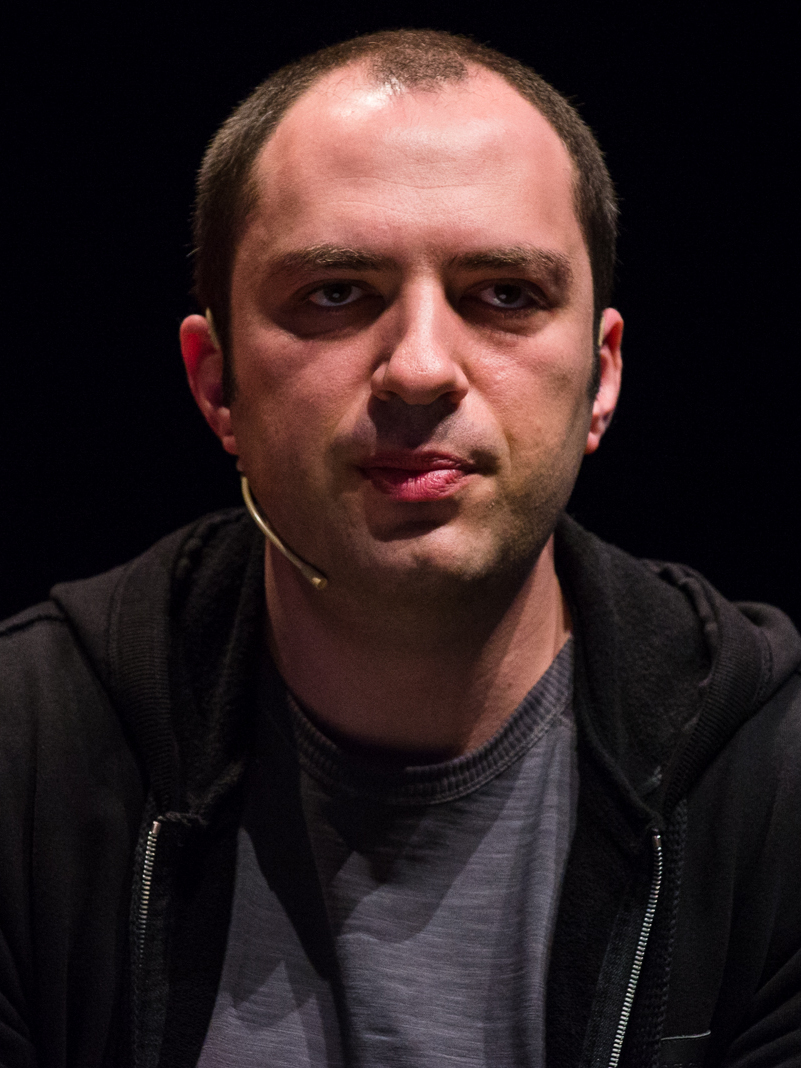
- Koum in 2014
- Born: February 24, 1976 (age 50); Kyiv, Ukrainian SSR, Soviet Union (now Kyiv, Ukraine)
- Education: San Jose State University (dropped out)
- Occupation: Businessman
- Years active: 1994–present

Jan Borysovych Koum (Note: Ukrainian: Ян Борисович Кум, romanized: Yan Borysovych Kum) (born February 24, 1976) is an American billionaire businessman and computer programmer. He is the co-founder and former CEO of WhatsApp, a mobile messaging app which was acquired by Facebook in 2014 for US$19.3 billion. According to Forbes, he has an estimated net worth of US$15.2 billion as of October 2023, making him one of the richest people in the world. Koum was ranked 44th on the Forbes' list of richest Americans in 2023 with a net worth of $15.1 billion.

== Early life ==
Jan Koum was born in Kyiv, then in the Ukrainian SSR, on February 24, 1976, into a Jewish family. He grew up in Fastiv. In 1992, at the age of 16, he moved with his mother and grandmother to Mountain View, California. A social support program helped the family get a small two-bedroom apartment there. His father had intended to join the family later, but he never left Ukraine and died in 1997. Koum and his mother remained in touch with his father until his death. At first, his mother worked as a babysitter while he worked as a cleaner at a grocery store. His mother died in 2000 after a long battle with cancer.

== Career ==
By the age of 18, Koum had become interested in computer programming. He enrolled at San Jose State University and simultaneously worked at Ernst & Young as a security tester. In 1997, Koum dropped out of university so that he could work as an infrastructure engineer at Yahoo!. He also joined w00w00, a computer security think tank started in 1996, where he met future Napster creators Shawn Fanning and Jordan Ritter.

In 1997, Koum met Brian Acton while working at Ernst & Young. Later that year, he was hired by Yahoo! as an infrastructure engineer. He quit school shortly thereafter. Over the next nine years, Koum and Acton worked at Yahoo! together. In September 2007, they left and took a year off, traveling around South America and playing ultimate frisbee. Both applied to work at Facebook but were rejected.

In January 2009, Koum bought an iPhone and realized that the then seven-month-old App Store was about to spawn a whole new industry of apps. He visited his friend Alex Fishman, and they talked for hours about Koum's idea for an app. Koum almost immediately chose the name WhatsApp because it sounded like "what's up". A week later, on his 33rd birthday, he incorporated WhatsApp Inc. in California.

WhatsApp was initially unpopular, but its fortunes began to turn after Apple added push notification ability to apps in June 2009. Koum changed WhatsApp to "ping" users when they received a message, and soon afterward he and Fishman's Russian-speaking friends in the area began to use WhatsApp as a messaging tool, in place of SMS. The app gained a large user base, and Koum convinced Acton, then unemployed, to join the company. Koum granted Acton co-founder status after Acton managed to bring in $250,000 in seed funding.

On February 9, 2014, Zuckerberg asked Koum to have dinner at his home, and formally proposed Koum a deal to join the Facebook board. Ten days later Facebook announced that it was acquiring WhatsApp for US$19 billion. Over the first half of 2016, Koum sold more than $2.4 billion worth of Facebook stock, which was about half of his total holdings.

In April 2018, Koum announced that he was leaving WhatsApp and stepping down from Facebook's board of directors due to disputes with Facebook. It was originally thought that by leaving he was forfeiting his invested stock, worth almost $1 billion. However, several months later it was discovered that he was still formally employed by Facebook, earning a reported $450 million in stock from the company through a method called "rest and vest".

== Philanthropic and political activity ==
To support relief efforts during the 2022 Russian invasion of Ukraine, Koum donated $17 million to the European Jewish Association and $10.6 million to the Federation of Jewish Communities of the CIS.

Koum has made donations to many Israeli causes: $600,000 to the Maccabee Task Force, $6 million to Friends of Ir David, and $175,000 to Central Fund of Israel. In 2022, he donated $2 million to AIPAC during the Democratic Party primaries. In May 2026, following years of smaller donations, he announced a further $200 million donation from his foundation to Shaare Zedek Medical Center in Jerusalem, Israel — the largest such contribution ever to any Israeli healthcare institution — which will be used towards the construction of a 24-story tower that will add 800 beds and other facilities to the hospital.

Koum has also donated to three universities: $1 million to Fordham and $41 million to Stanford. Additionally, Koum donated an undisclosed amount to Tel Aviv University, which later awarded him an honorary degree.

=== Affiliation with a pro-Israel campaign ===
During the 2024 U.S. election campaign, Koum was one of the leading donors to the United Democracy Project, a Super PAC affiliated with the pro-Israel group AIPAC. He also donated $5 million to a Super PAC supporting the presidential campaign of Nikki Haley.

Around 2024, he donated $250,000 to a committee supporting the candidacy of Daniel Lurie for mayor of San Francisco.

In 2026, the Jan Koum Foundation donated $36 million to Milken Community School to name their newly acquired Bel-Air campus the Jan Koum Campus. Inside Philanthropy's 2026 profile of the Koum Family Foundation described its Jewish grantmaking as especially concentrated on Chabad-Lubavitch-affiliated nonprofits, noting that Chabad of the North Peninsula in San Mateo had received $4.5 million.

== Personal life ==
Koum is Jewish. He dislikes being called an entrepreneur and once tweeted: "Next person to call me an entrepreneur is getting punched in the face by my bodyguard." He feels that he is not an entrepreneur because entrepreneurs are motivated by the desire to make money, whereas he has said that he only wants to build useful products.

In February 1996, a San Jose court issued a restraining order against Koum after his ex-girlfriend accused him of verbal and physical threats. In October 2014, Koum expressed regret, stating, "I am ashamed of the way I acted and ashamed that my behavior forced her to take legal action".

In November 2023, Koum acquired Château de la Garoupe in Cap d'Antibes on the French Riviera, previously owned by the Russian oligarch Boris Berezovsky, for about 65 million euros.
