= Henry McLaren, 2nd Baron Aberconway =

2nd Baron Aberconway, politician and horticulturist (1879–1953)

The Right Honourable The Lord Aberconway CBE
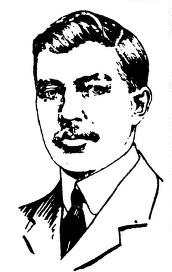

Member of Parliament for Bosworth
- In office 3 December 1910 – 26 October 1922
- Preceded by: Charles McLaren
- Succeeded by: Guy Paget

Member of Parliament for West Staffordshire
- In office 12 January 1906 – 15 January 1910
- Preceded by: Sir Alexander Henderson
- Succeeded by: George Lloyd

Personal details
- Born: Henry Duncan McLaren; 16 April 1879; Richmond upon Thames, England
- Died: 23 May 1953 (aged 74); Bodnant Garden, Wales
- Spouse: Christabel Mary Melville Macnaghten
- Parent(s): Charles McLaren, 1st Baron Aberconway; Laura Elizabeth Pochin
- Education: Balliol College, Oxford

Henry Duncan McLaren, 2nd Baron Aberconway, CBE (16 April 1879 – 23 May 1953) was a British politician, horticulturalist and industrialist. He was the son of Charles McLaren, 1st Baron Aberconway and Laura Pochin.

== Education ==
Born in Richmond upon Thames, he was educated at Eton and obtained a Master of Arts from Balliol College, Oxford. In 1903 he became a barrister of Lincoln's Inn.

== Career ==
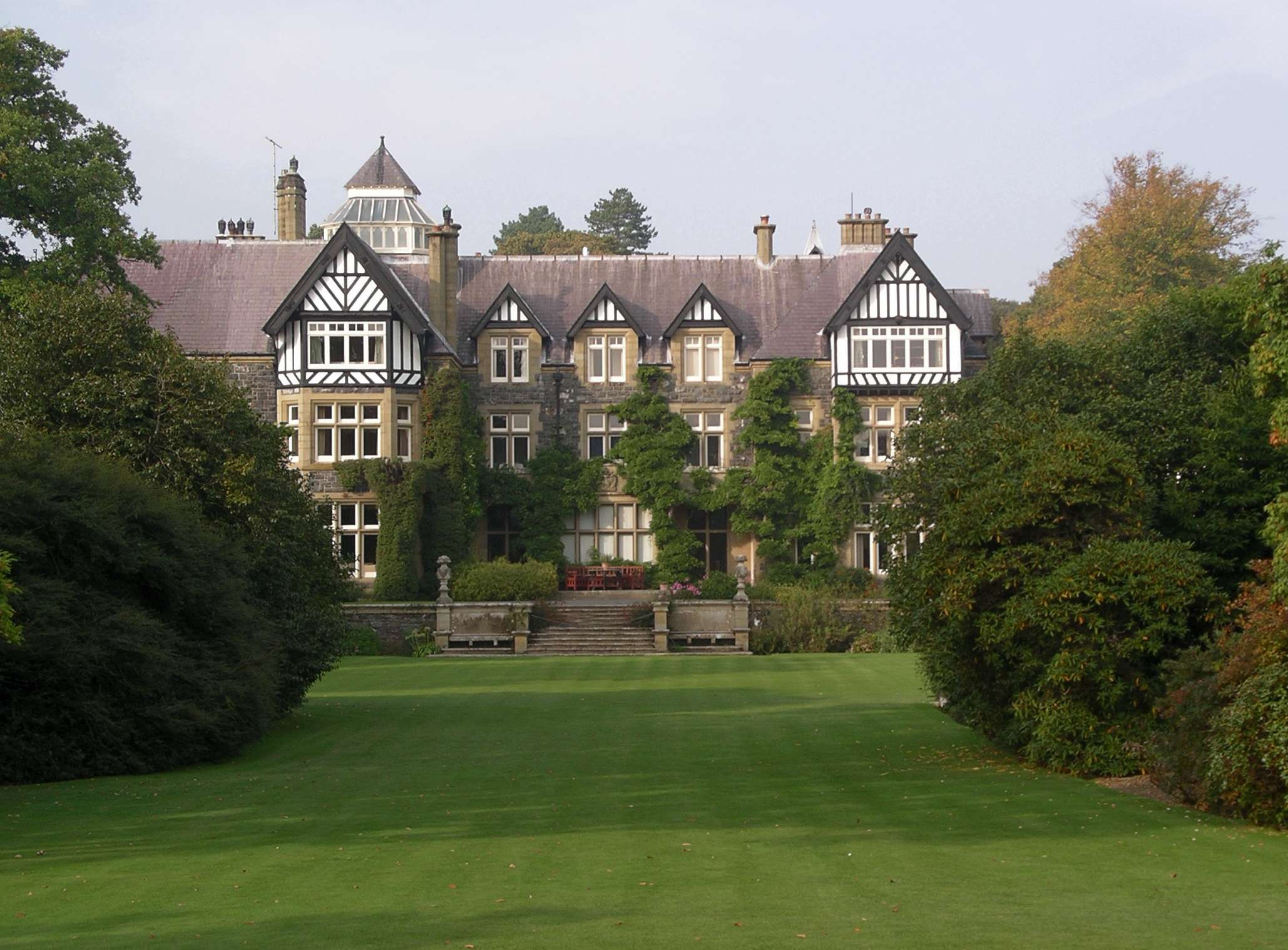
Bodnant House – a family seat

In 1906 he was elected Member of Parliament (MP) for West Staffordshire as a Liberal, and was private under-secretary to the president of the Board of Trade, David Lloyd George, until 1908. In 1910, he stood for his father's old seat of Bosworth and replaced him. He left politics in 1922, and succeeded his father to the Barony in 1934.

McLaren was an industrialist, and chaired companies from both sides of the family, including John Brown & Company and the Tredegar Iron and Coal Company. In 1915 he was the founding chairman of the Design and Industries Association. Around the end of his political career, in 1920, he had Aberconway House built as a residence in Mayfair. He would also inherit the family estate (originally his maternal grandfather's) in Conwy, North Wales, where he extensively developed and added to the Bodnant Garden. He was an avid horticulturalist and took interest in the breeding of rhododendrons and magnolias. He sponsored several botanical collectors, including George Forrest, and Rhododendron aberconwayi is named in his honour. He died at Bodnant, aged 74, and was buried at the mausoleum called "The Poem" within Bodnant Garden, the traditional burial place of the Lords Aberconway.

== Family ==
He married Christabel Mary Melville Macnaghten (1890–1974), the daughter of Sir Melville Macnaghten, and had five children:

- Elizabeth Mary McLaren (31 May 1911 – 4 December 1991), married and had issue, including Sir Kenneth Carlisle
- Charles McLaren, 3rd Baron Aberconway (1913–2003)
- S/Ldr. John Francis McLaren (1919–1953)
- Dame Anne McLaren (1927–2007), a biologist and Fellow of the Royal Society, married researcher Donald Michie and had issue, including Susan Michie and Jonathan Michie
- Christopher Melville McLaren (b. 15 April 1934), married and has issue

Parliament of the United Kingdom
| Preceded by Sir Alexander Henderson, Bt | Member of Parliament for West Staffordshire; 1906–January 1910 | Succeeded by George Lloyd |
| Preceded by Charles McLaren | Member of Parliament for Bosworth; December 1910–1922 | Succeeded by Guy Paget |
Peerage of the United Kingdom
| Preceded by Charles McLaren | Baron Aberconway; 1934–1953 | Succeeded by Charles McLaren |
