= Aberconway House =

Listed house in the City of Westminster, London

Coordinates: 51.5084°N 0.1505°W

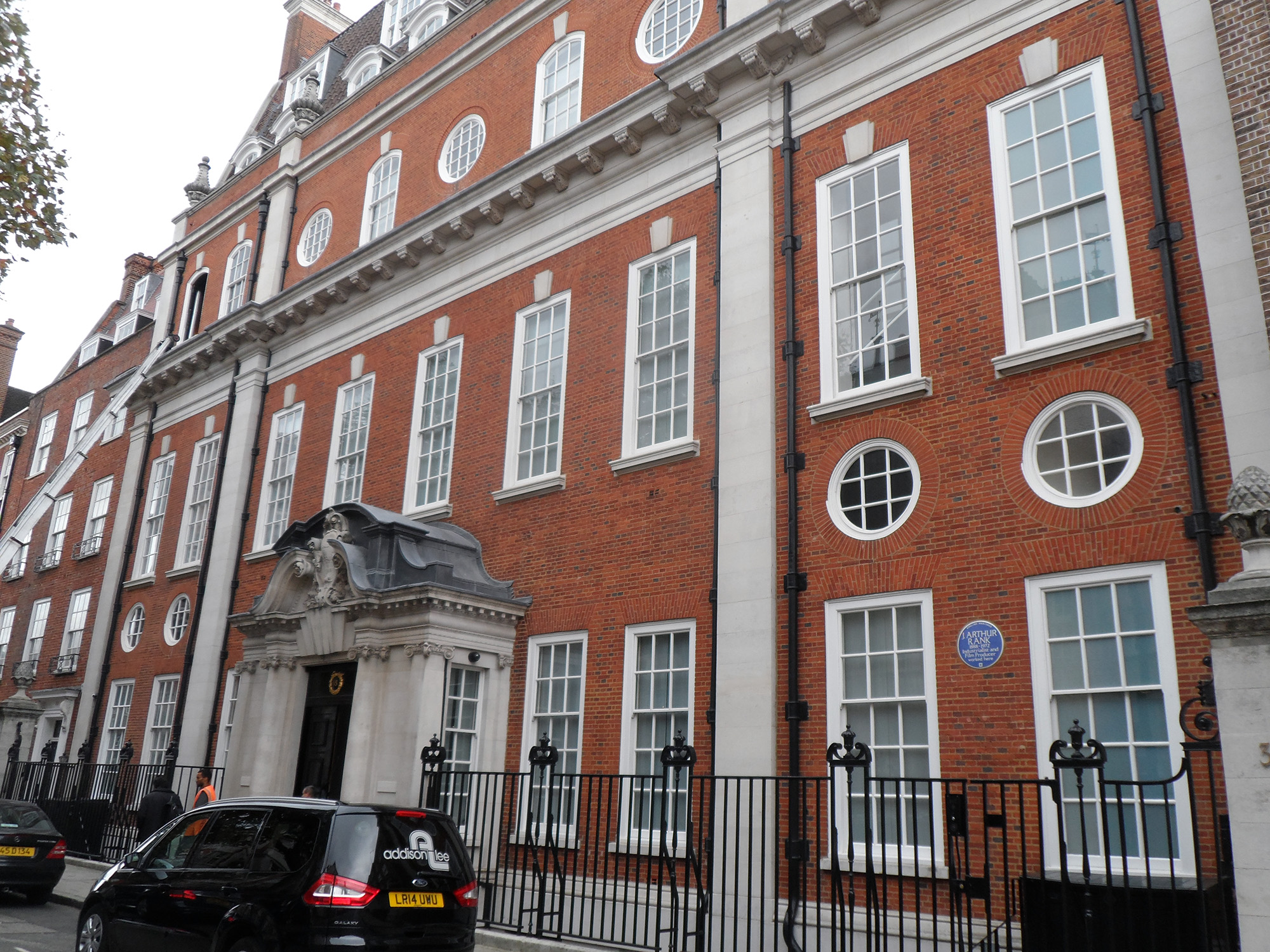
Aberconway House

Aberconway House, no. 38, South Street, Mayfair, in the City of Westminster, was constructed between 1920 and 1922 for the industrialist Henry McLaren, 2nd Baron Aberconway, in a neo-Georgian style. Aberconway House is an imposing mansion of 22,788 sq ft (2,117.1 m^{2}), with an adjoining guest house with ancillary accommodation of 8,651 sq ft (803.7 m^{2}). Both properties have a southerly aspect over and access into one of Mayfair's Secret Gardens. The official architects were Edmund Wimperis and his partner W. B. Simpson whose masterpiece was the landmark Mayfair House. However, 38 South Street was in fact almost entirely designed by the young John Murray Easton who was later responsible for the Royal Horticultural Society's New Hall of 1926–1928.

In 2007, the developer and estate agent Portman Heritage listed the house for sale at £46 million. In December 2023, it was announced that the Indian billionaire Adar Poonawalla had agreed to buy the house for £138m.
