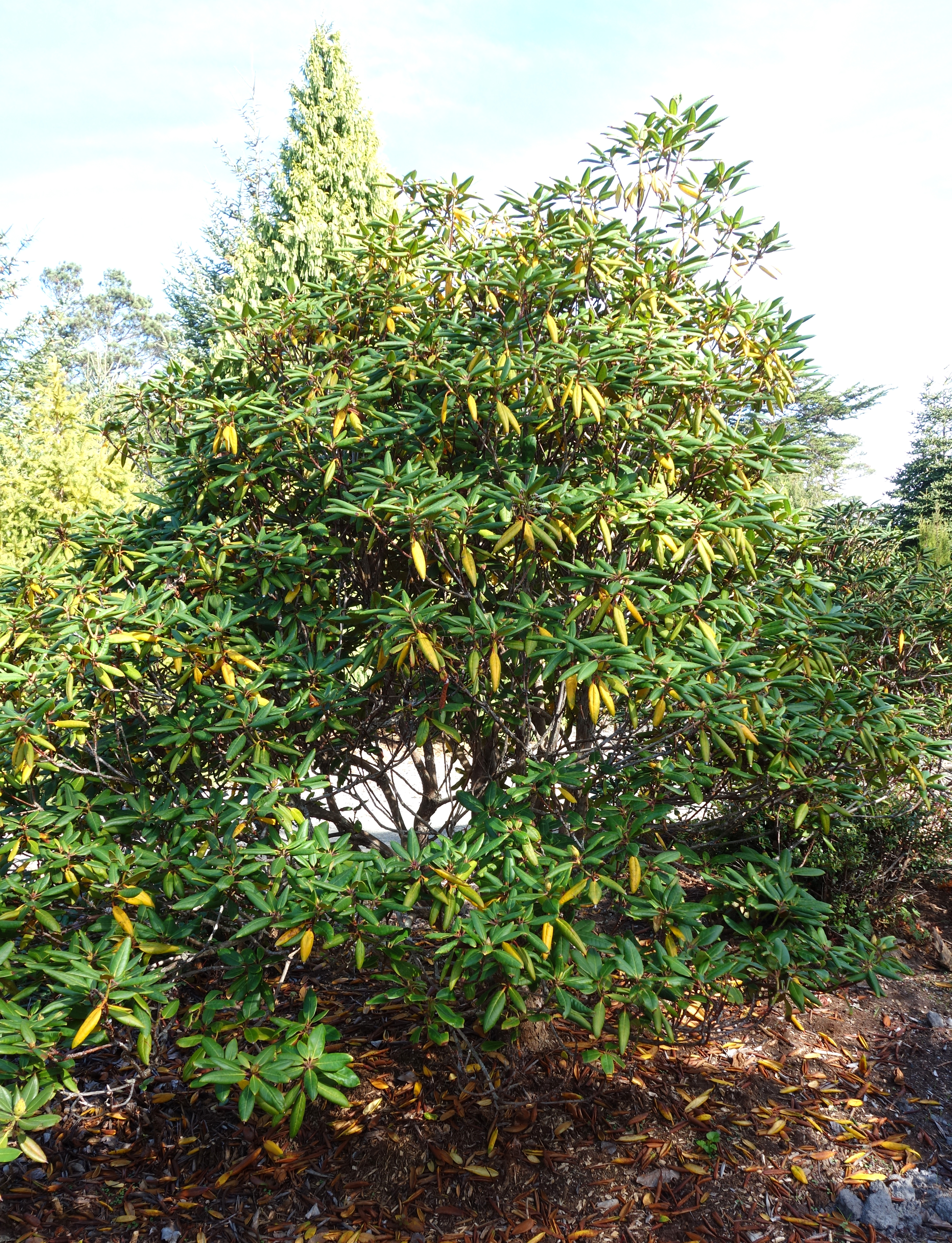

Scientific classification
- Kingdom: Plantae
- Clade: Tracheophytes
- Clade: Angiosperms
- Clade: Eudicots
- Clade: Asterids
- Order: Ericales
- Family: Ericaceae
- Genus: Rhododendron
- Species: R. aberconwayi

Binomial name
- Rhododendron aberconwayi Cowan

= Rhododendron aberconwayi =

Species of plant

Rhododendron aberconwayi (碟花杜鹃) is a species of flowering plant in the heath family Ericaceae, native to north-central Yunnan, China, where it grows at altitudes of 2,200–2,500 m (7,200–8,200 ft). This evergreen shrub grows to 1.5–2.5 m (4.9–8.2 ft) in height, with leathery leaves that are oblong-elliptic to broadly lanceolate, 2.5–5 by 1–1.8 cm in size. The flowers are predominantly white or pale pink, spotted purple.

This is a hardy plant requiring full sun and ericaceous (acid pH) soil.
