= Baron Aberconway =

Title in the Peerage of the United Kingdom

Barony Aberconway
- Or, two chevronels invected gules, between two shepherd's crooks in chief and in base a castle triple-towered sable, masoned argent, flags, windows and portcullis of the second
- Creation date: 21 June 1911
- Created by: King George V
- Peerage: Peerage of the United Kingdom
- First holder: Charles McLaren, 1st Baron Aberconway
- Present holder: Henry McLaren, 4th Baron Aberconway
- Heir apparent: Charles Stephen McLaren
- Remainder to: 1st Baron's heirs male of the body lawfully begotten
- Subsidiary titles: Baronet of Bodnant, Gwylgre and Hilders
- Motto: Bi'se mac na Cromaig ("He will be a son of the Crozier")

Baron Aberconway, of Bodnant in the County of Denbigh, is a title in the Peerage of the United Kingdom. It was created on 21 June 1911 for the industrialist and Liberal politician Sir Charles McLaren, 1st Baronet. He had already been created a baronet, of Bodnant, Gwylgre and Hilders, on 24 July 1902.

His eldest son, the second Baron, was a businessman and also sat as a member of parliament. He was succeeded by his son, the third Baron. In August 1939, the future third Baron was part of a secret delegation sent to Germany by Lord Halifax to offer Adolf Hitler concessions on the assurance that he would not invade Poland. Since 2003, the title passed to his eldest son, the fourth Baron.

Aberconway is the anglicised form of the Welsh place name Aberconwy, the original name of Conwy town in Welsh.

The family seat is Bodnant House, near Tal-y-Cafn, Conwy, Wales. The traditional burial place of the Lords Aberconway is a mausoleum called "The Poem" within Bodnant Garden.

== Barons Aberconway (1911) ==
- Charles Benjamin Bright McLaren, 1st Baron Aberconway (1850–1934)
- Henry Duncan McLaren, 2nd Baron Aberconway (1879–1953)
- Charles Melville McLaren, 3rd Baron Aberconway (1913–2003)
- Henry Charles McLaren, 4th Baron Aberconway (born 1948)

The heir apparent is the present holder's son, Charles Stephen McLaren (born 1984).

Baronetage of the United Kingdom
Preceded by Lipton baronets	McLaren baronets of Bodnant, Gwylgre and Hilders; 24 July 1902	Succeeded by Muntz baronets
