= Charles McLaren, 3rd Baron Aberconway =

British industrialist and horticulturalist

Charles McLaren
- The Lord Aberconway
- Baron Aberconway in 1965
- Born: 16 April 1913
- Died: 4 February 2003 (aged 89)
- Spouses: Deirdre Knewstub (m. 1941; div. 1949); Ann Bullard (née Aymer) (m. 1949)
- Father: Henry McLaren, 2nd Baron Aberconway
- Mother: Christabel Mary Melville Macnaghten

Charles Melville McLaren, 3rd Baron Aberconway, JP (16 April 1913 – 4 February 2003) was a British industrialist and horticulturalist. He was the son of Henry McLaren, 2nd Baron Aberconway, and Christabel Macnaghten. He died in 2003.

== Education ==
He was educated at Eton and New College, Oxford, and became a barrister of the Middle Temple.

== Career ==
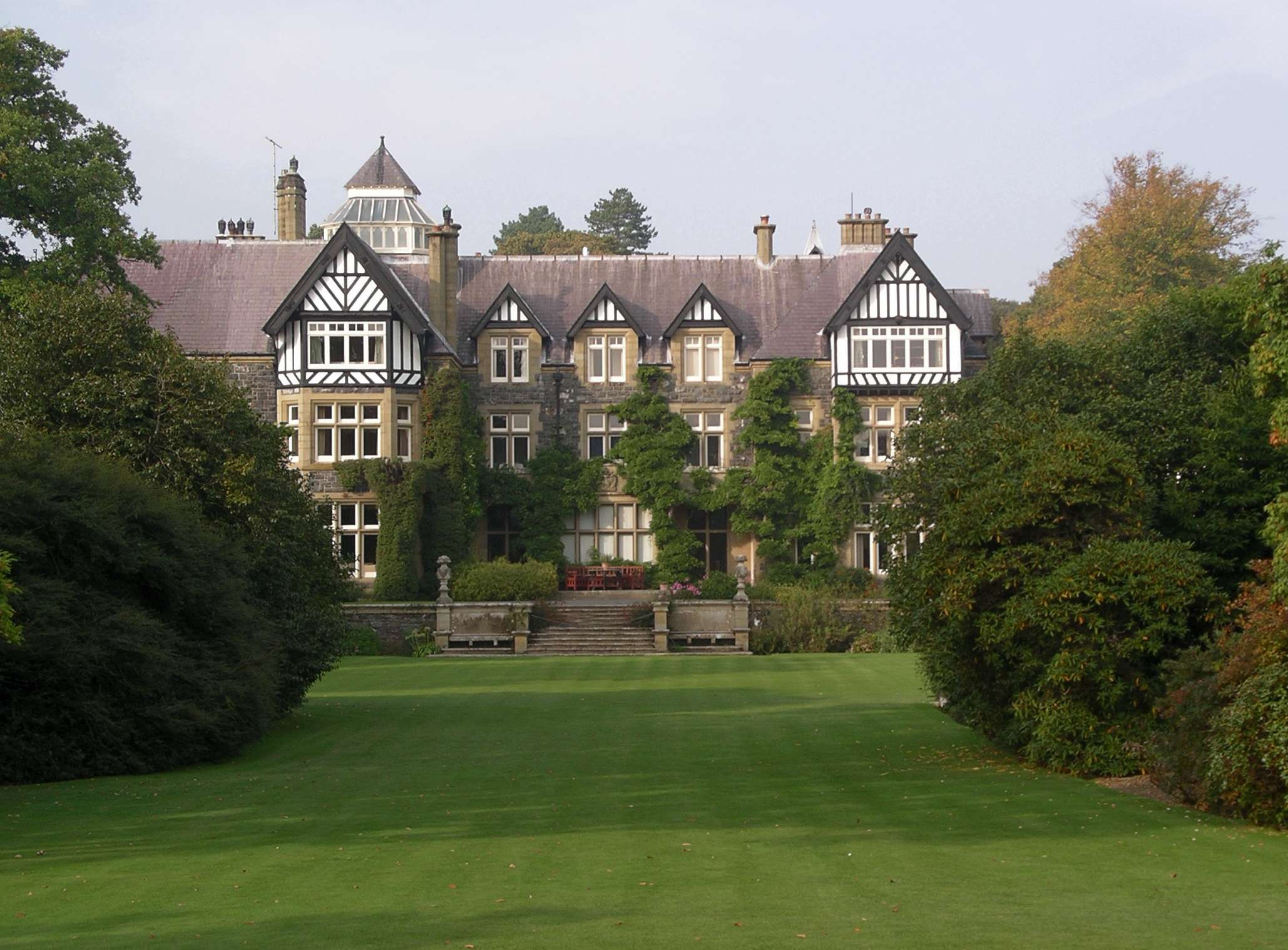
Bodnant House, the family seat

As a young man, he became a director of John Brown & Company, where his father was chairman. Due to this connection, he took part in the secret, unofficial meeting of British businessmen with Hermann Göring arranged by Birger Dahlerus in August 1939 as a last-ditch effort to forestall war.

During the Second World War, he served in the Royal Artillery, becoming a second lieutenant. After the war, he took a more active role in the family corporations, preparing to succeed his father. He was also a director of Westland Aircraft from 1947 to 1985. He was made a Justice of the Peace for Denbighshire in 1946, and High Sheriff of Denbighshire in 1950.

In 1953, he succeeded his father in the barony, the chairmanship of John Brown and English China Clays, and various other industrial interests. He continued in these chairmanships until 1986 and 1984, respectively. Despite his corporate responsibilities, Lord Aberconway took a keen interest in horticulture. Besides maintaining the family's Bodnant Garden, he was the President of the Royal Horticultural Society from 1961 to 1983 and oversaw the management of the Chelsea Flower Show. His annual assertion became famous:

I think I can say, without fear of contradiction, that this is the finest Chelsea Flower Show ever

Despite inheriting a seat in the House of Lords, he rarely attended. Throughout his life, he enjoyed writing pithy, memorable and topical letters to The Times. He is buried at the mausoleum called "The Poem" within Bodnant Garden, the traditional burial place of the Lords Aberconway.

== Family ==
He married Deirdre Knewstub, daughter of John Knewstub, on 6 December 1941, and had three children:

1. Julia Harriet McLaren (b. 22 September 1942), married Capt. Charles Ridley and has issue
2. Dr Caroline Mary McLaren (b. 24 October 1944), married Raimund Sargent and has issue
3. Henry Charles McLaren, 4th Baron Aberconway (b. 1948)

The couple divorced in 1949, and he married Ann Bullard (née Aymer, mother of the Countess of Onslow) the same year. They had one son:

1. Michael Duncan McLaren, KC (b. 29 November 1958), married Caroline Stacey and has issue; present manager of Bodnant Garden.

Honorary titles
| Preceded by John Charles Wynne-Finch | High Sheriff of Denbighshire; 1950 | Succeeded by Ririd Myddelton |
Peerage of the United Kingdom
| Preceded by Henry McLaren | Baron Aberconway; 1953–2003 | Succeeded by Charles McLaren |
