= Charles McLaren, 1st Baron Aberconway =

Scottish lawyer, politician, and industrialist (1850–1934)

The Right Honourable The Lord Aberconway PC KC JP
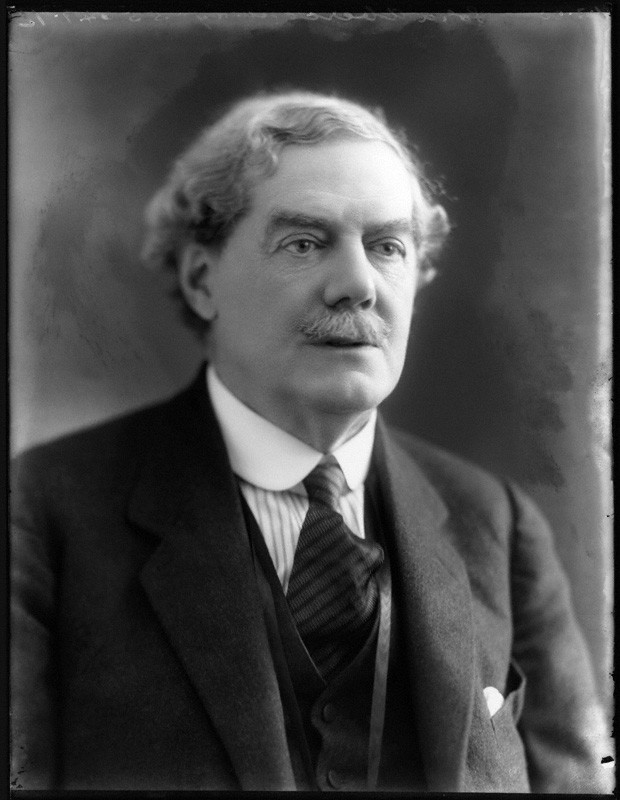

Member of Parliament for Bosworth
- In office 4 July 1892 – 3 December 1910
- Preceded by: James Ellis
- Succeeded by: Henry McLaren

Member of Parliament for Stafford
- In office 3 April 1880 – 24 November 1885
- Succeeded by: Thomas Salt

Personal details
- Born: Charles Benjamin; Bright McLaren; 12 May 1850 Edinburgh, Scotland
- Died: 23 January 1934 (aged 83) London, England
- Party: Liberal
- Spouse: Laura Elizabeth Pochin (m. 1877; died 1933)
- Children: 4 (including Henry, Francis and Priscilla)
- Parent(s): Duncan McLaren; Priscilla Bright

Charles Benjamin Bright McLaren, 1st Baron Aberconway, PC, KC, JP (12 May 1850 – 23 January 1934), known as Sir Charles McLaren, 1st Baronet, between 1902 and 1911, was a Scottish jurist and Liberal Party politician. He was a landowner and industrialist.

== Early life and education ==
Born in Edinburgh, McLaren was the son of the politician Duncan McLaren and Priscilla Bright. Priscilla was McLaren's third wife, and was the daughter of Jacob Bright and the sister of the Liberal statesman John Bright and temperance activist Margaret Bright Lucas. His full siblings included the Liberal MP Walter McLaren and the philanthropist Helen Priscilla McLaren, wife of Italian dietitian Andrea Rabagliati. Among McLaren's half-siblings were the judge John McLaren from his father's first marriage and the doctor Agnes McLaren from his father's second marriage.

McLaren was educated at Grove House School and then studied at the University of Heidelberg as well as the University of Bonn. He finally graduated from the University of Edinburgh first class honours with a Master of Arts.

== Political career ==
Charles McLaren c.1895

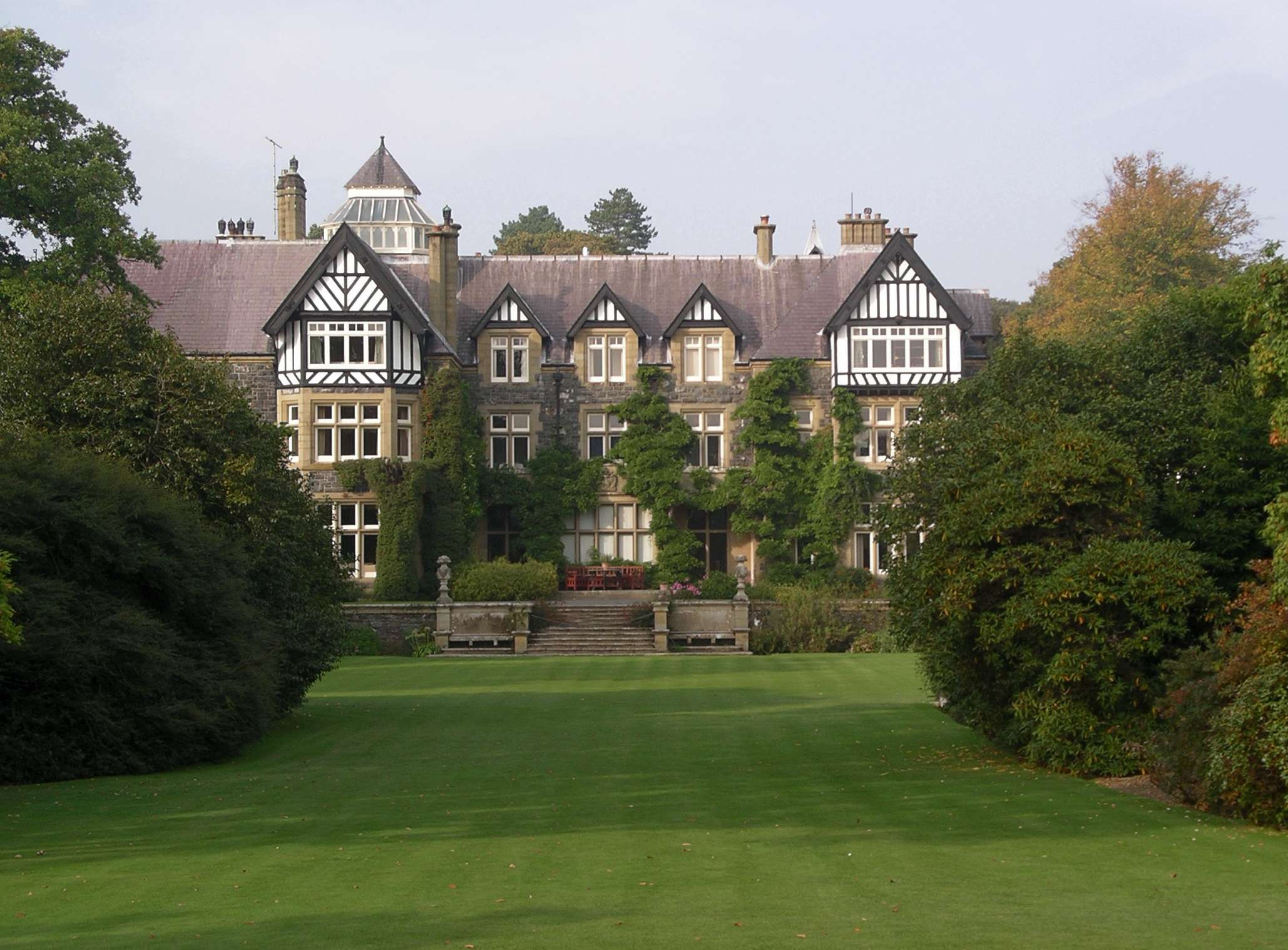
Bodnant House - owned by the family

McLaren began his career in journalism, but turned to the law and in 1874, he was admitted to Lincoln's Inn as a barrister. In 1880, he was elected to the House of Commons as member of parliament (MP) for Stafford; he served that constituency until 1886. In 1892, he returned to the Commons as MP for Bosworth, which he represented until 1910.

McLaren's political career advanced during his second term, and in 1897 he was appointed a Queen's Counsel. It was announced that he would receive a baronetcy in the 1902 Coronation Honours list published on 26 June 1902 for the (subsequently postponed) coronation of King Edward VII, and on 24 July 1902 he was created a Baronet, of Bodnant, in the County of Denbigh. He was sworn of the Privy Council in 1908, and held the office of justice of the peace in Middlesex, Flint, Denbighshire, and Surrey. In 1911, a year after he had left the Commons (his son replaced him), he was raised to the Peerage of the United Kingdom with the title Baron Aberconway, of Bodnant, in the County of Denbigh.

McLaren was decorated with the 3rd class of the Japanese Order of the Sacred Treasure and received the Serbian Order of the Cross of Takovo. He was awarded a Commander of the Greek Order of the Redeemer.

== Career in industry ==
His father-in-law, a noted industrialist, died in 1895, and McLaren became increasingly involved in the management of the companies inherited from him. He would become chairman of the Tredegar Iron and Coal Company and the British Iron Trade Association. McLaren chaired also the London-based Metropolitan Railway Company and the shipbuilding firm John Brown & Company.

== Family ==
On 6 March 1877, McLaren married Laura, the daughter of the chemist Henry Davis Pochin and suffragist Agnes Heap, in Westminster; the couple had four children. He and his wife were neighbours and friends of James McNeill Whistler, owning several of his works.

Laura died in 1933 and McLaren survived her until the following year. They are buried at a mausoleum called "The Poem" within Bodnant Garden, which became the traditional burial place of the Lords Aberconway. On his death in 1934, in Belgrave Square in London, the barony and baronetcy passed to his eldest son, Henry. His second son Francis sat also in the Parliament of the United Kingdom, however was killed during the First World War in his father's lifetime. The older daughter Priscilla was a socialite as well as activist and married the journalist Sir Henry Norman, 1st Baronet. Her younger sister Elsie was the wife of Sir Edward Johnson-Ferguson, 2nd Baronet.

== Sources ==
- Charles Roger Dod & Robert Phipps Dod (1915). Dod's Peerage, Baronetage and Knightage of Great Britain and Ireland for 1915. London: Simpkin, Marshall, Hamilton, Kent and Co. Ltd.
- Boyns, Trevor (28 September 2006) [2004]. "McLaren, Charles Benjamin Bright, first Baron Aberconway (1850–1934)". Oxford Dictionary of National Biography (online ed.). Oxford University Press. doi:10.1093/ref:odnb/34776. (Subscription, Wikipedia Library access or UK public library membership required.)
- thePeerage.com

Parliament of the United Kingdom
Preceded by Thomas Salt; Alexander MacDonald	Member of Parliament for Stafford; 2-seat constituency until 1885; 1880–1886; With: Alexander Macdonald 1880–1881; Thomas Salt 1881–1885	Succeeded by Thomas Salt
Preceded by James Ellis	Member of Parliament for Bosworth; 1892 – December 1910	Succeeded by Henry McLaren
Peerage of the United Kingdom
New creation	Baron Aberconway; 1911–1934	Succeeded by Henry McLaren
Baronetage of the United Kingdom
New creation	Baronet (of Bodnant); 1902–1934	Succeeded by Henry McLaren
