= Bodnant Garden =

National Trust gardens in Conwy, Wales

Coordinates: 53.2342°N 3.8006°W

- Gardd Bodnant
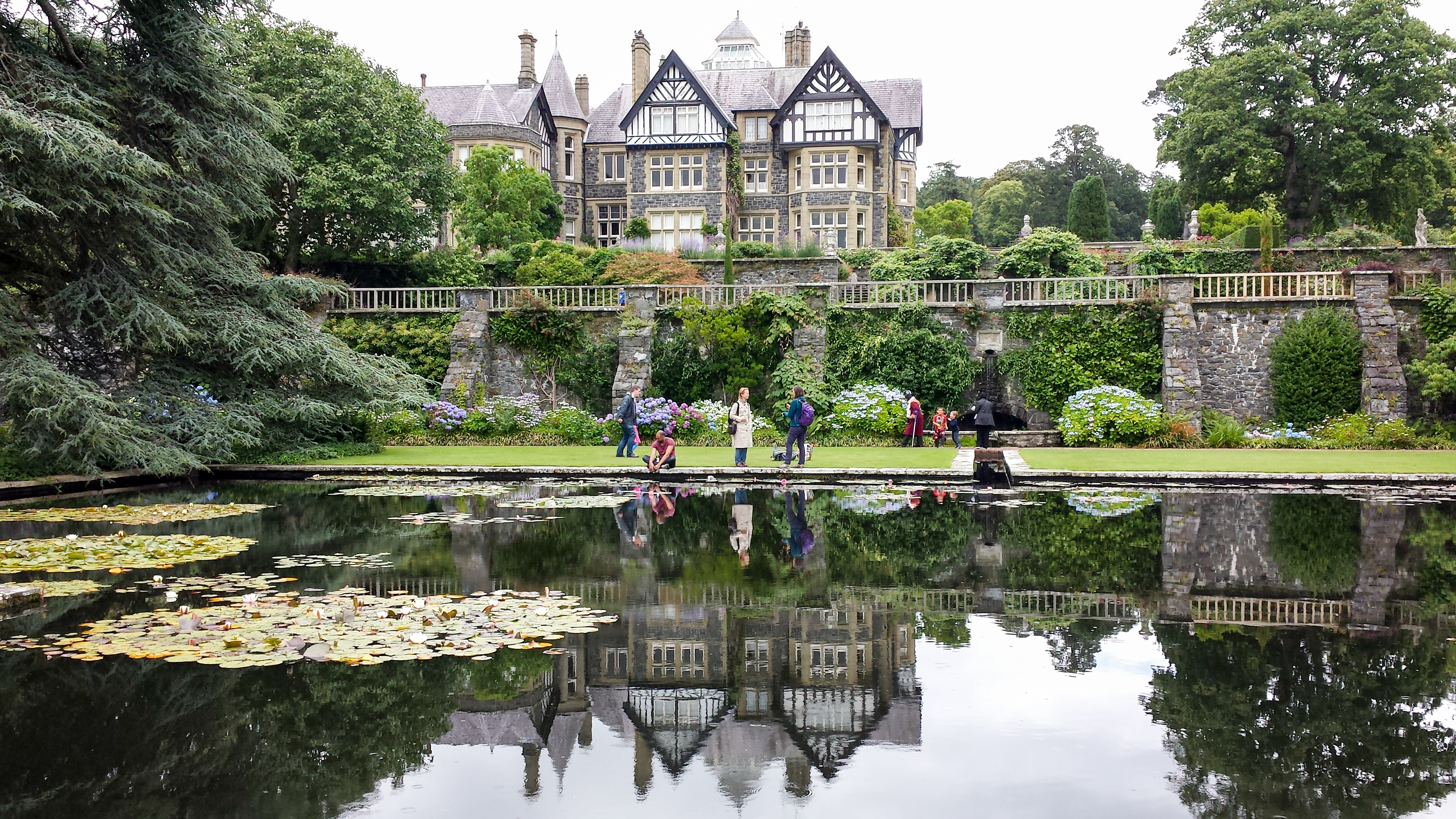
- Bodnant Hall overlooking the Lily Terrace
- Interactive map of Bodnant Garden
- Location: Tal-y-Cafn, Conwy, Wales
- Created: 1792 (house constructed); 1874 (garden expanded)
- Designated: 1949
- Operator: National Trust
- Visitors: 274,591 (in 2024)
- Collections: Magnolia; Embothrium; Eucryphia; Rhododendron forrestii Bodnant Rhododendron Hybrids
- Website: www.nationaltrust.org.uk/visit/wales/bodnant-garden

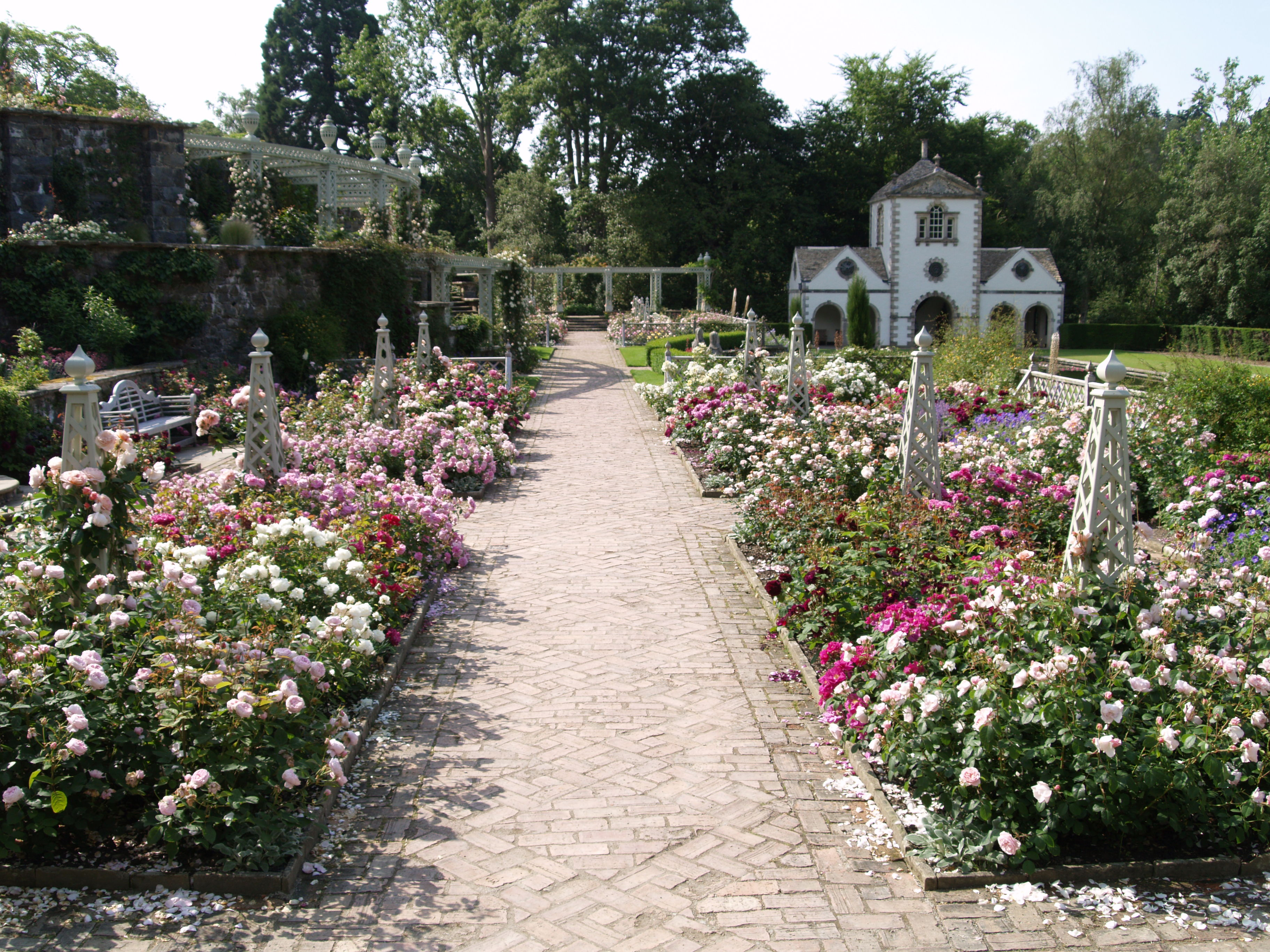
Rose garden at Bodnant

Bodnant Garden (Welsh: Gardd Bodnant) is a National Trust property near Tal-y-Cafn, Conwy, Wales, overlooking the Conwy valley towards the Carneddau mountains.

Founded in 1874 and developed by five generations of one family, it was given to the National Trust in 1949. The garden spans 80 acres of hillside and includes formal Italianate terraces, informal shrub borders stocked with plants from around the world, a rocky outcrop known as the Dell, a gorge garden, areas of woodland garden with a number of notable trees and a waterfall. Since 2012, new areas have opened including the Winter garden, Old Park Meadow, Yew Dell and The Far End, a riverside garden. Furnace Wood and Meadow opened in 2017. There are plans to open more new areas, including Heather Hill and Cae Poeth Meadow. The garden is designated Grade I, the highest grade, on the Cadw/ICOMOS Register of Parks and Gardens of Special Historic Interest in Wales.

Bodnant Garden was visited by over 274,000 people in 2024 and is famous for its Laburnum arch, the longest in the UK, which flowers in May and June. The garden is also celebrated for its link to the plant hunters of the early 1900s whose expeditions formed the base of the garden's five National Collections of plants – Magnolia, Embothrium, Eucryphia, Rhododendron forrestii, and Bodnant Rhododendron Hybrids.

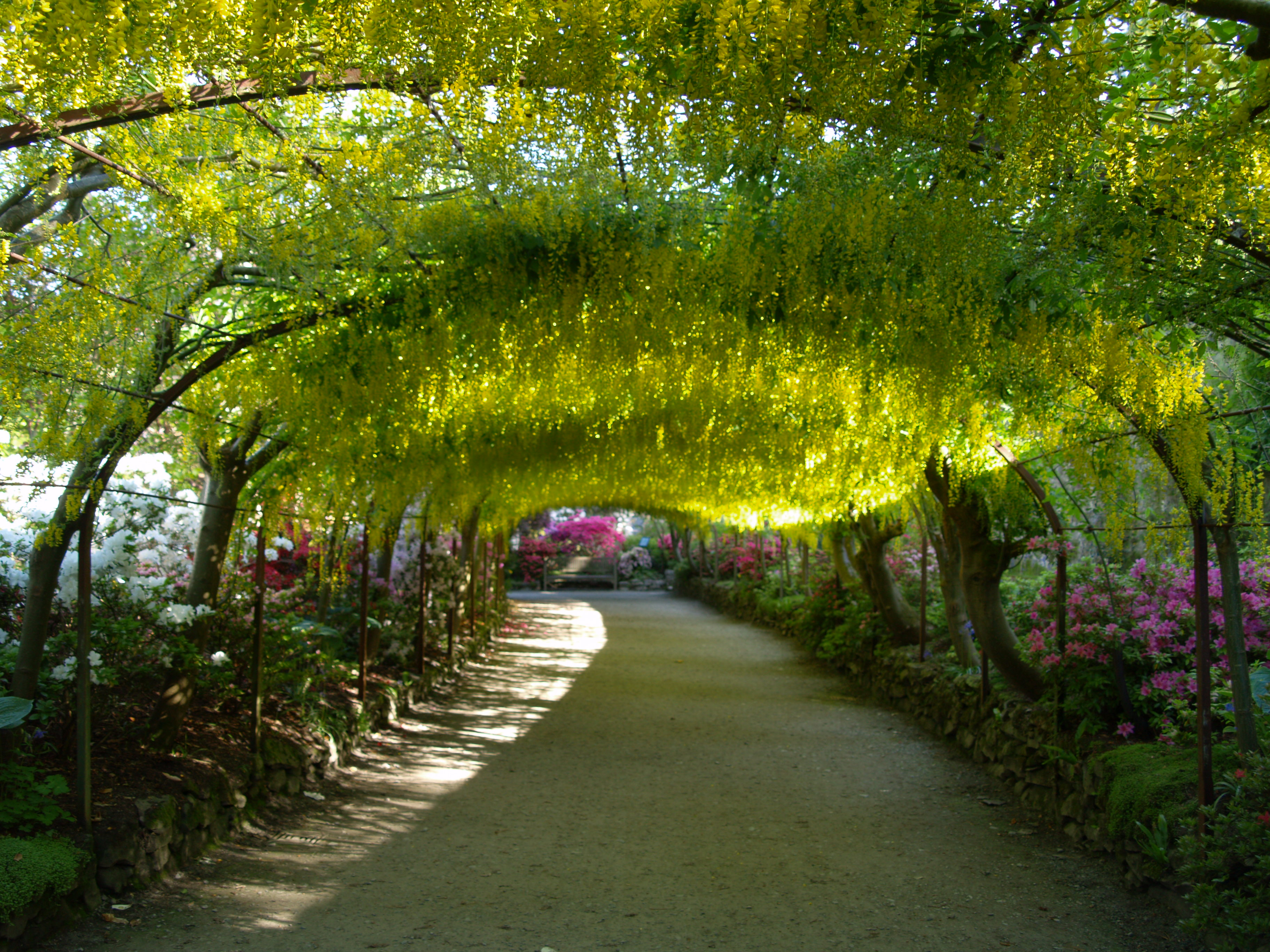
Laburnum arch

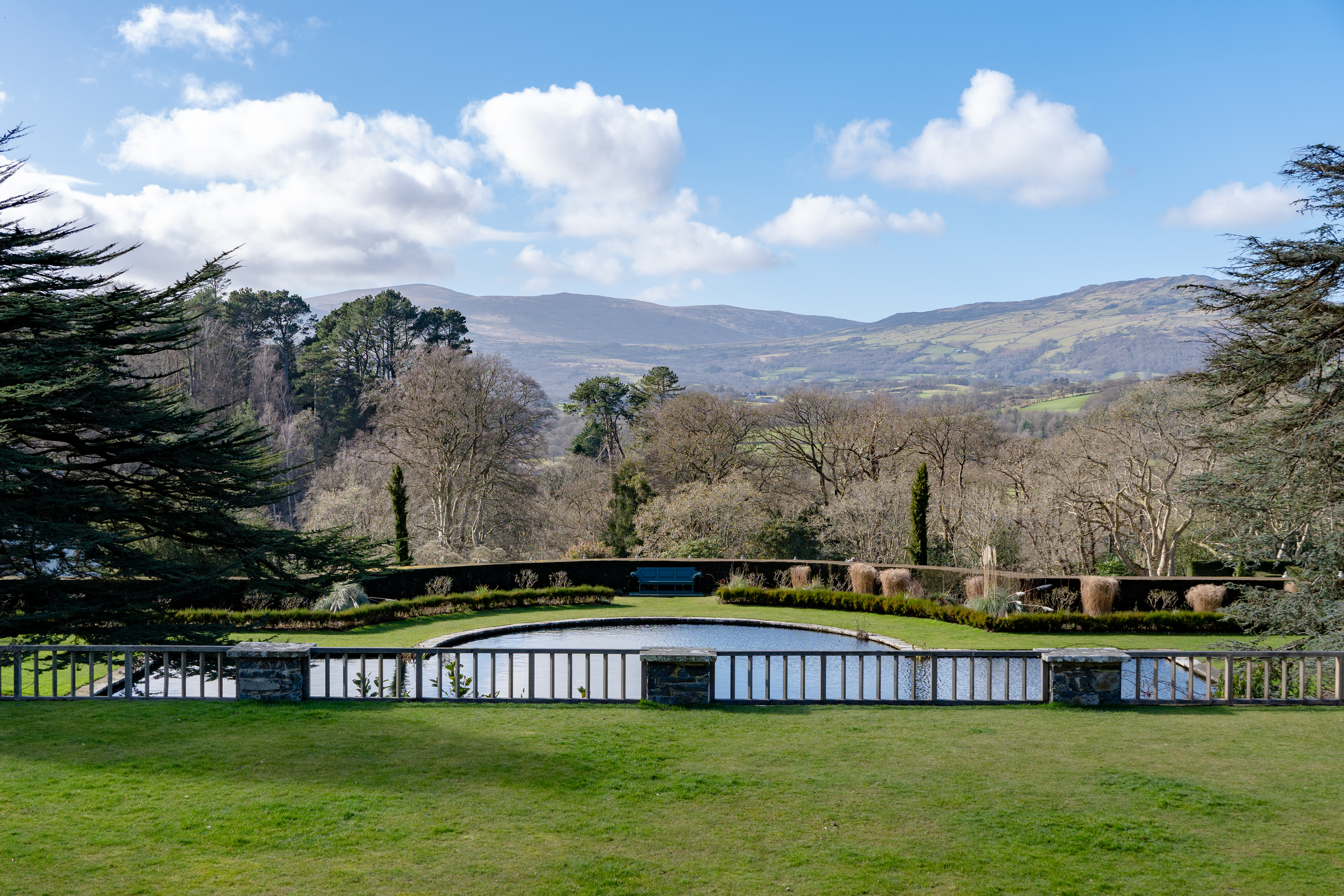
Terraces and lily pond, with the Carneddau mountains in the background

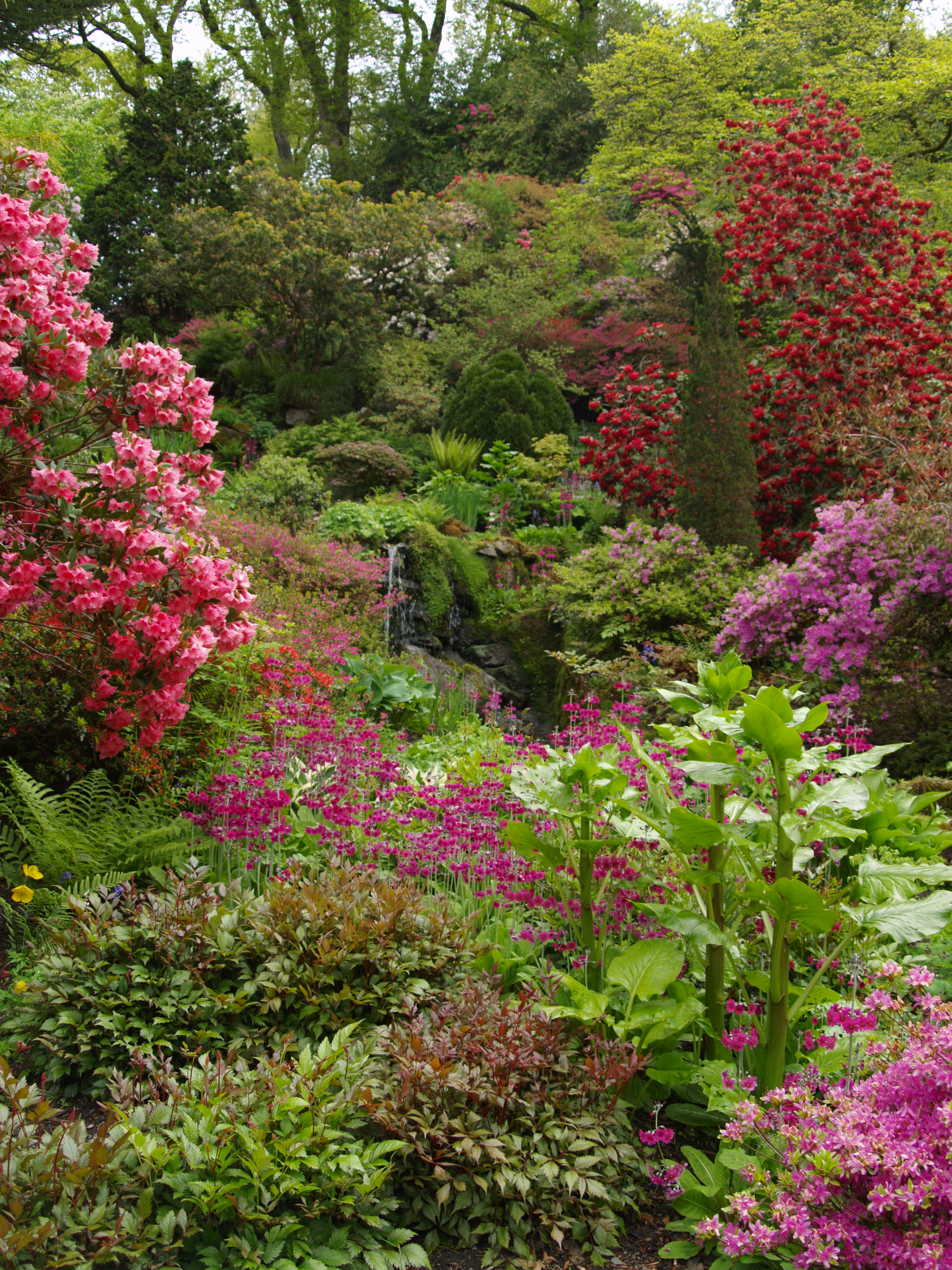
Rhododendrons

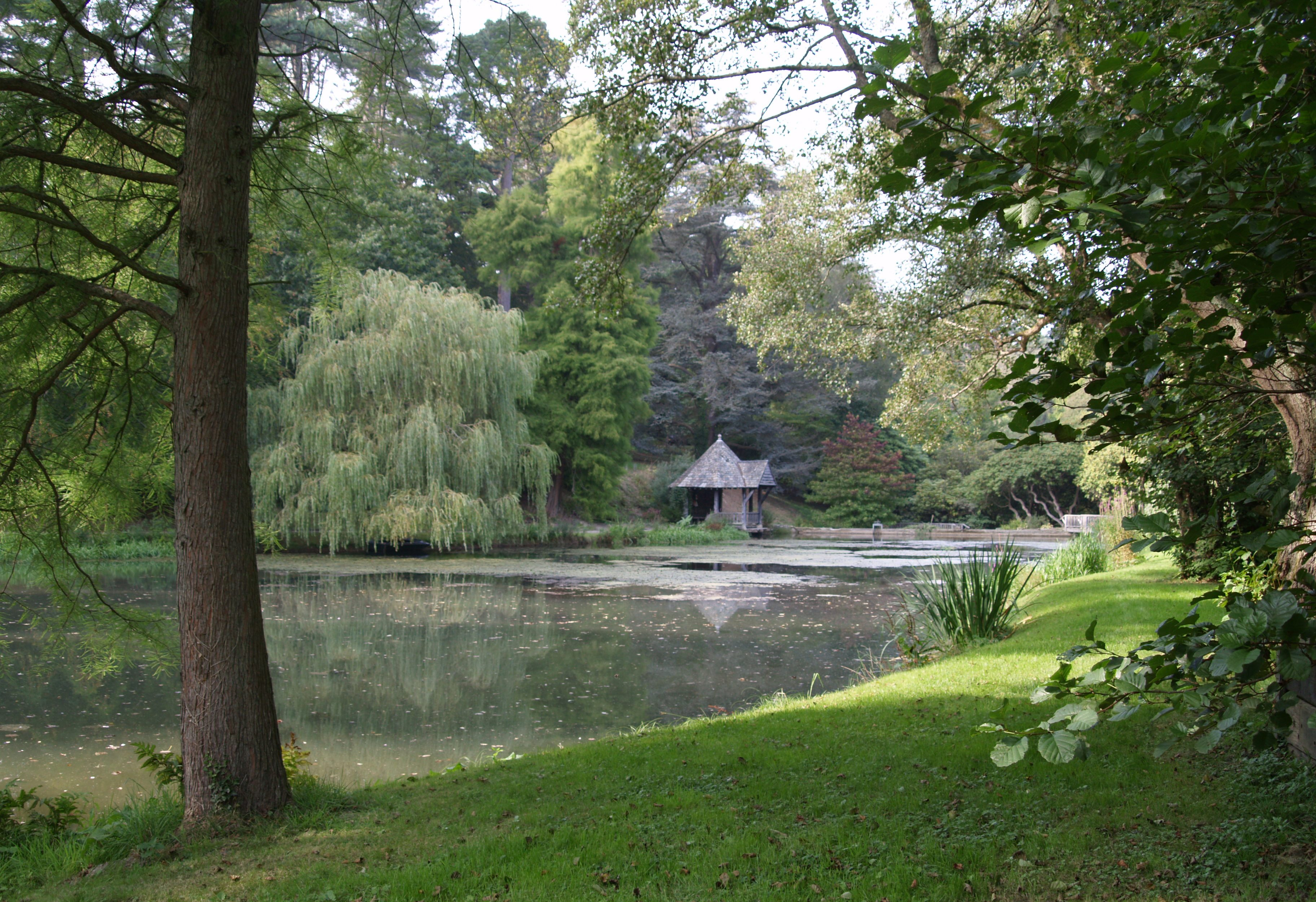
Boat House and Skating Pond

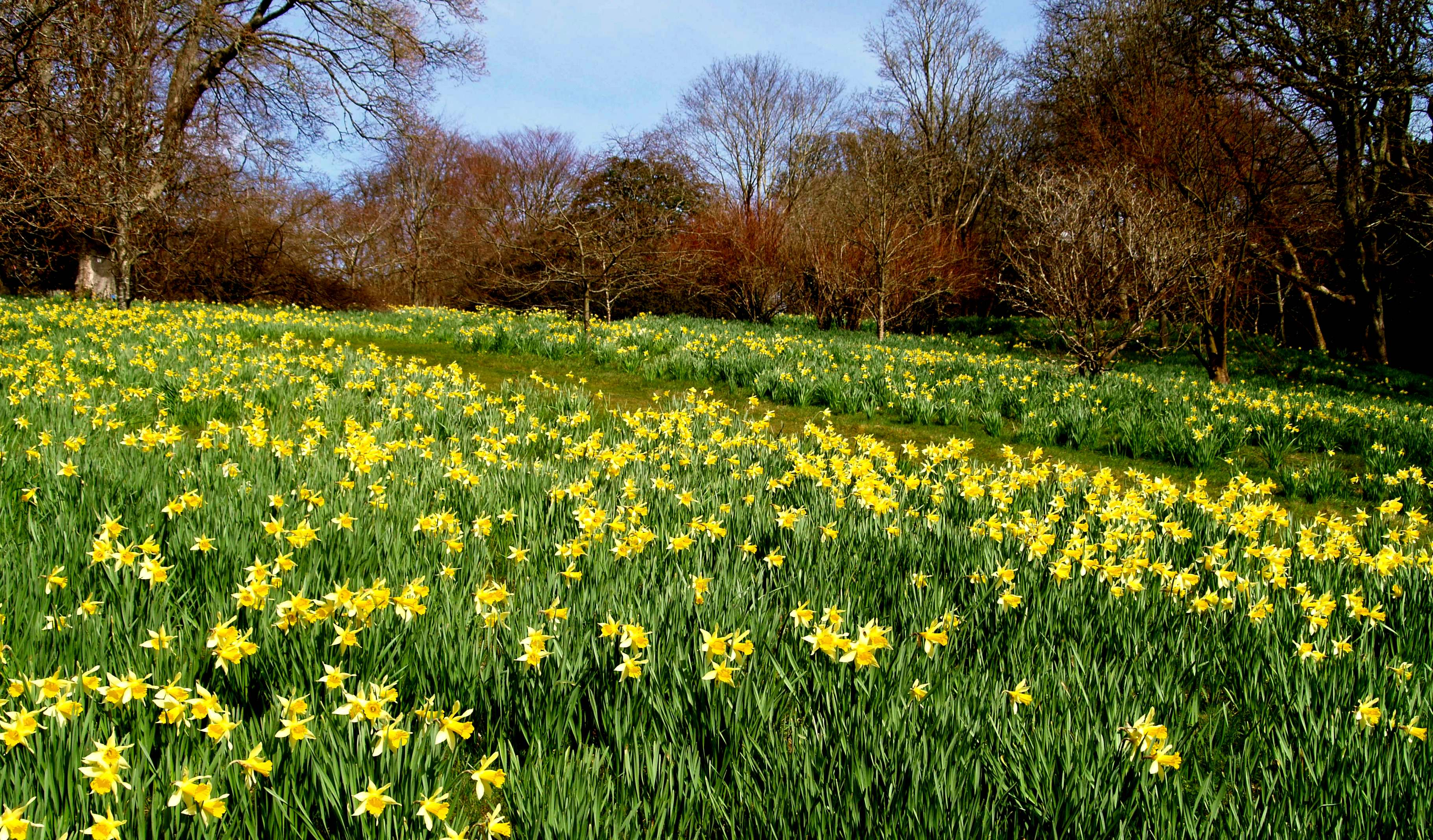
Daffodils

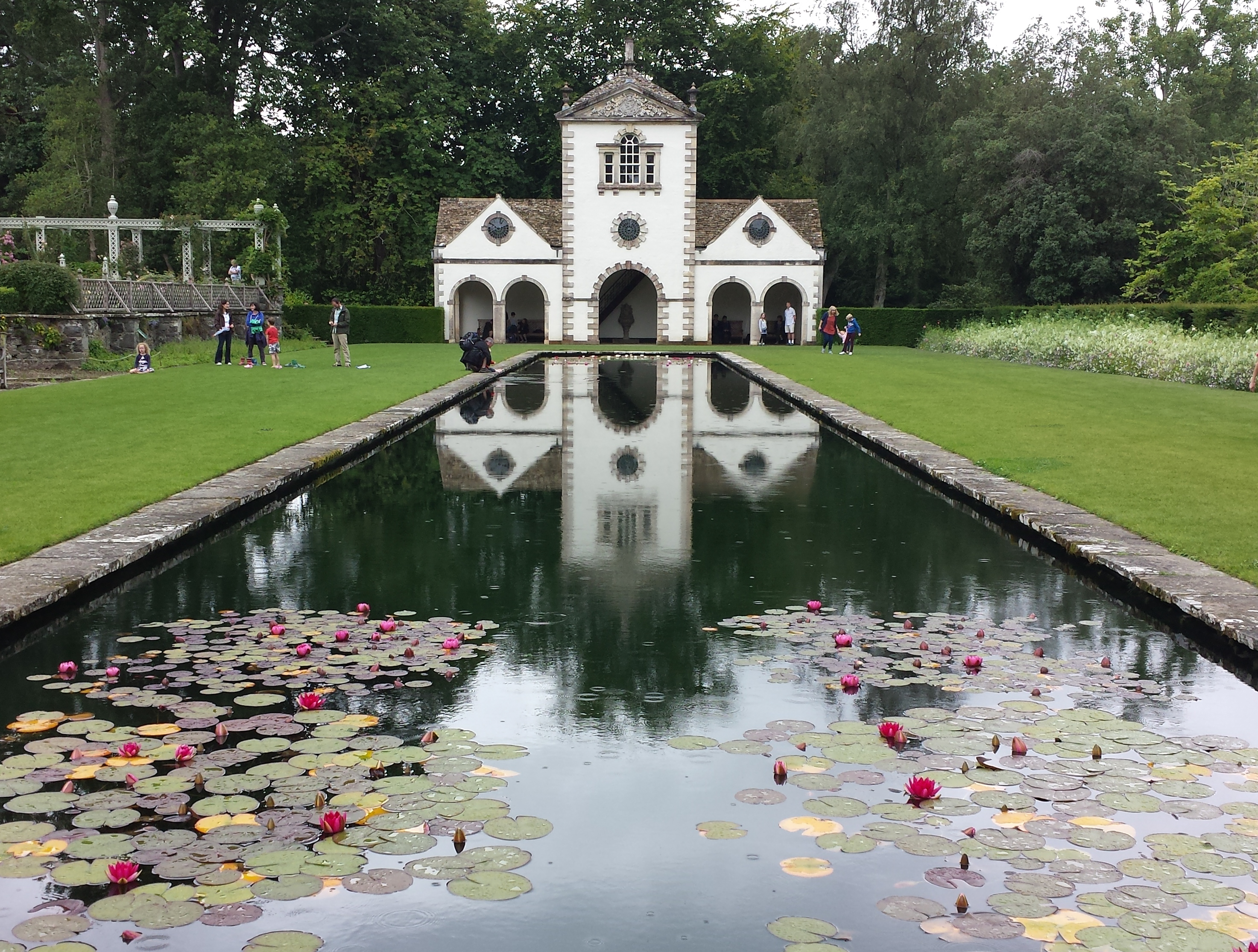
The Pin Mill and Lily Pond

== History ==
The garden's founder, Henry Davis Pochin, was a Leicestershire-born Victorian industrial chemist who acquired fame and fortune inventing a process for clarifying rosin used in soap, turning it from the traditional brown to white. He became a successful businessman and an MP for Salford. Pochin bought the Bodnant estate in 1874 and employed Edward Milner, apprentice to Joseph Paxton, to redesign the land around the existing Georgian mansion house, then just lawns and pasture. Together Pochin and Milner relandscaped the hillside and valley, planting American and Asian conifers on the banks of the River Hiraethlyn to create a Pinetum, and reinforcing stream banks to create a woodland and water garden in the valley, in the style of the garden designer of the day William Robinson in his book The Wild Garden. In the upper garden, Pochin and Milner created the Laburnum Arch and glasshouses, to house exotics.

The development of the garden was continued by Henry and Agnes Pochin’s daughter Laura McLaren, Baroness Aberconway, who married Charles McLaren, 1st Baron Aberconway. Laura, like her mother, was a campaigner for women's suffrage and founded the Liberal Women's Suffrage Union. She was also a passionate gardener and inspired her son Henry McLaren, 2nd Baron Aberconway, to whom she entrusted the care of the garden in 1901. Together they created the Skating Pond at the Far End and began work on the Italianate Terraces. Henry McLaren oversaw the major developments of the garden. He sponsored plant hunting expeditions of the day by explorers such as Ernest Henry Wilson, George Forrest and Frank Kingdon-Ward who brought back plants from China and the Himalayas including magnolias, camellias and rhododendrons. He also invested in a plant breeding programme producing Bodnant hybrid rhododendrons.

From 1905 to 1914 Henry oversaw the completion of the five terraces. This was a massive earth-moving project done by men without machinery, which involved levelling the hillside and building granite buttress walls which provided protection for tender plants being introduced to the garden from overseas. The Pin Mill building on the Canal Terrace was added in 1938. Originally built in 1730 in Gloucestershire, it was rescued from decay by Henry, who dismantled it, brought to Bodnant and rebuilt it brick by brick. Throughout the 1900s the continued development of the garden was a partnership between three generations of the McLaren family – Henry, Charles and Michael – and three generations of head gardeners Frederick, Charles and Martin Puddle. Like his father, Charles McLaren became president of the Royal Horticultural Society in 1961. As was his father and grandmother, he was also awarded the highest accolade of the RHS, the Victoria Medal of Honour. Charles’ sister Dr Anne McLaren was one of Britain's leading scientists. She pioneered techniques of reproductive biology which led to in vitro fertilisation (IVF) and cancer research.

Henry went on to become president of the RHS for 22 years. He persuaded the National Trust to accept gardens on their own merit and in 1949 he handed over Bodnant Garden to the National Trust, the second garden after Hidcote. On August 18, 1952 Vita Sackville-West and husband Harold Nicolson were given a day long conducted tour by Henry. Nicolson commented in his diary: "the Dell is the most extensive, most varied and most tasteful piece of planting I have ever seen". He further commented "I have no doubt at all that this is the richest garden I have ever seen. Knowledge and taste are combined with enormous expenditure to render it one of the wonders of the world". Charles' son Michael McLaren inherited the property in 2003. He is a practising barrister and continues to act as garden manager. Troy Scott Smith took over as head gardener in 2006, then was succeeded in 2015 by John Rippin.

The garden is designated Grade I on the Cadw/ICOMOS Register of Parks and Gardens of Special Historic Interest in Wales.

== "The Poem" ==
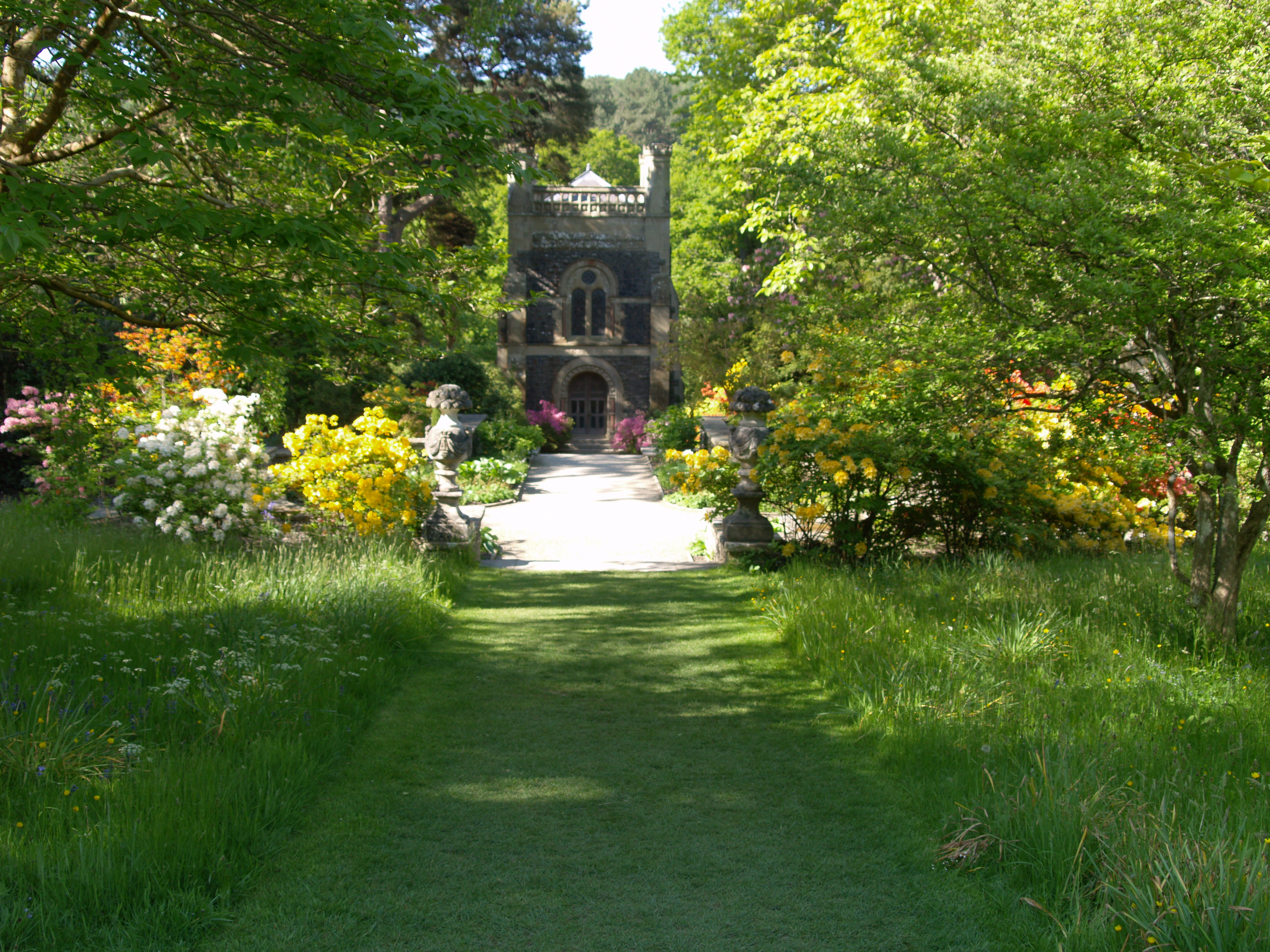
"The Poem"

Located in an area of the Shrub Borders within the garden, "The Poem" is the McLaren family mausoleum. It sits on an outcrop of rock at the end of the valley known as the Dell. Grade II-listed for architectural interest, it was designed by architects W J Green of London, whilst the spectacular marble inside was sculpted by Samuel Barfield of Leicester. The roof is slate, in a shallow pyramidal style with a parapet and octagonal turrets at each corner. Above the arched entrance with voussoirs supported on columns of red marble, is a sandstone band inscribed ‘The Poem’ in raised decorative lettering. Built in 1882 by the garden's founder, Henry Davis Pochin, as memorial to his children, four of whom died in infancy, the Neo-Gothic construction now contains busts and memorial tablets dedicated to the McLaren family members whose remains lie in the crypt beneath. These monuments are located in twenty arch-topped niches set into the interior walls of the building. The mausoleum was last used in 2003 following the burial of Charles McLaren, 3rd Baron Aberconway.

== Plants and plant hunters ==
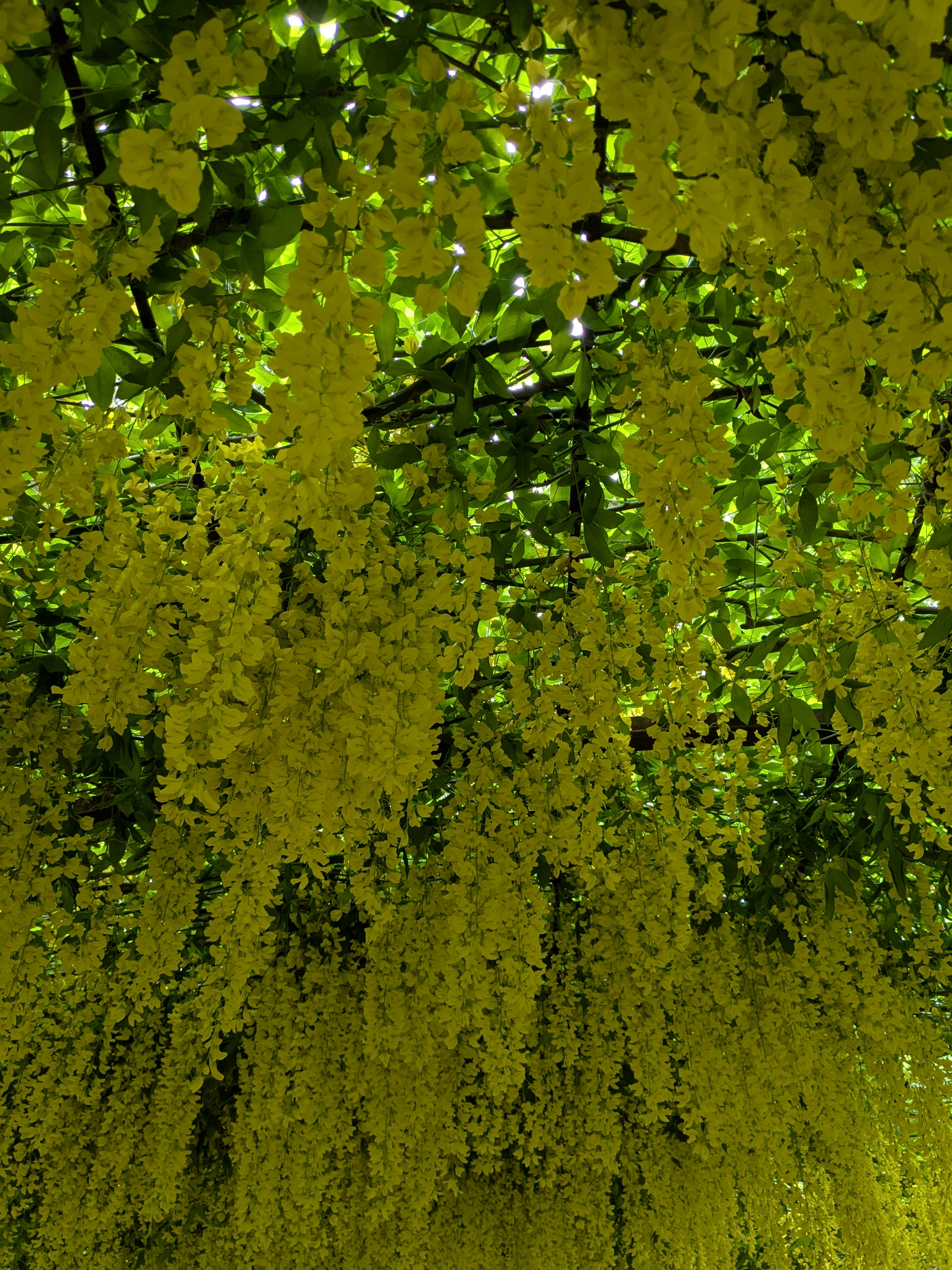
Laburnum arch at Bodnant Garden in bloom

Bodnant Garden has a connection with 19th and early 20th century explorers, who brought back plants for the garden, including four National Collections, of Rhododendron forrestii, Magnolia, Eucryphia and Embothrium species. Today the garden also has twenty two Champion Trees, noted for their age, height and horticultural merit.

Henry Pochin's legacy to Bodnant was planting the garden's great conifers; the cedars on the Lily Terrace (from Africa and Middle East) and the Pinetum in the Dell which includes American and Asian conifers including Pseudotsuga menziesii (Douglas Fir) Pinus radiata, Sciadopitys verticella (Japanese Umbrella Pine), Chamaecyparis pisifera (Japanese false cypress and Sequoiadendron giganteum (Giant Redwood).

The next phase of plant hunting was under Pochin's grandson Henry McLaren, 2nd Lord Aberconway who sponsored expeditions from the Edwardian period which brought in large numbers of rhododendrons, camellias and magnolias to Britain. Notable plant hunters connected to Bodnant Garden included Ernest Wilson, who travelled extensively in China. He was first engaged by famous Veitch Nursery with the specific task of bringing back seeds of the Handkerchief Tree (Davidia involucrata), one of which still grows in Bodnant Garden's Shrub Borders. He also brought back many magnolias for which the garden is famous, and other trees including the Acer griseum, Meliosma beaniana and Sorbus meliosmifolia. Wilson also discovered and brought back the Lilium regale which now grow on the rose terraces.

In 1917 the recently formed Rhododendron Society, of which Lord Aberconway was a prominent member, employed plant hunter George Forrest to source rhododendrons. Forrest was a seasoned explorer who collected plants in western China and Tibet for nursery owner Arthur Bulley. His expeditions brought back seed of many new rhododendrons and Bodnant's gardeners were able to raise the plants in great numbers. Lord Aberconway and his head gardener Frederick Puddle set about hybridising the new rhododendron species they had raised, to create the Bodnant Hybrid Rhododendrons, of which the garden has around 350. Forrest also brought back to Bodnant Garden seed of Primula bulleyana still seen around the garden.

Frank Kingdon-Ward conducted numerous expeditions to the Himalayas during the 1920s and 1930s which resulted in the introduction of a prolific number of new species to Bodnant Garden including the Himalayan Blue Poppy (Meconopsis betonicifolia). He also collected and introduced rhododendron including Rhododendron cinnabarinum ‘Orange Bill’.

In 1925 Harold Frederick Comber was sponsored by garden owners calling themselves the Andes Syndicate, headed by Lord Aberconway, to travel in South America. This gave Bodnant the basis of two of its national collections, the Chilean Flame Tree (Embothrium coccineum) and Eucryphia. Great care was taken to protect some of Harold Comber's other introductions from South America, many of which were planted against a sheltered wall behind the Laburnum Arch. Some of Comber's plants still grow there today, such as the Crinodendron patagua and Desfontania spinosa.

== Media appearances ==
- During the summer of 2018, filming took place at Bodnant for the film The Secret Garden, directed by Marc Munden.
- It appeared as the venue of two episodes of BBC One’s Antiques Roadshow in February and April 2021, filmed in 2020.

== See also ==
- List of gardens in Wales

== Notes ==
- The Garden at Bodnant, Jarrold Publishing Norwich and Bodnant Garden, 2001.
