= McLaren (surname) =

McLaren is a surname. Notable people with the surname include:

- Alan McLaren (born 1971), Scottish footballer
- Andrew McLaren, Scottish curler
- Andy McLaren (1922–1996), Scottish football player
- Andy McLaren (born 1973), Scottish football player
- Angus McLaren (born 1988), Australian actor
- Angus McLaren (historian) (1942–2024), Canadian historian
- Anne McLaren (1927–2007), British zoologist
- Bill McLaren (1923–2010), Scottish sports broadcaster
- Billy McLaren (born 1948), Scottish football player
- Brandon Jay McLaren (born 1980), Canadian actor
- Brian McLaren (born 1956), American Christian minister
- Bruce McLaren (1937–1970), New Zealand racing driver, automotive designer, engineer and motorsport executive
- Charles Benjamin Bright McLaren (1850–1934), Scottish jurist and politician
- Charles Melville McLaren (1913–2003), British industrialist and horticulturalist
- Colin McLaren, Australian writer
- David McLaren (1872–1939), New Zealand politician
- Digby McLaren (1919–2004), Canadian geologist and palaeontologist
- Duncan McLaren (1800–1886), Scottish politician
- Dylan McLaren (born 1982), Australian football player
- Eddie McLaren (1929–2020), Scottish footballer
- Francis McLaren (1886–1917), British politician
- Frankie and George McLaren (born 1997), British twin actors
- Frank McLaren (1881–1961), Scottish footballer for Hearts and Hamilton Academical
- Frederick McLaren (1874–1952), English cricketer
- Geoff McLaren (1921–1992), Australian politician
- Gregory Paul McLaren ("Lucky Diamond Rich"; born 1971), Guinness World Record holder as "the world's most tattooed person"
- Henry Charles McLaren (born 1948), British peer
- Henry Duncan McLaren (1879–1953), British politician, horticulturalist and industrialist
- Hollis McLaren (born 1956), Canadian actress
- James McLaren (rugby) (born 1972), Scottish rugby player
- Jim McLaren (1897–1975), Scottish football player
- Jock McLaren ("Jock"; 1902–1956), Australian military officer
- John McLaren (disambiguation)
  - John McLaren, Lord McLaren (1831–1910), Scottish politician and judge
  - John McLaren (1846–1943), American horticulturist
  - John McLaren (1871–1958), Australian public servant
  - John McLaren (1886–1921), Australian cricketer
  - John McLaren (born 1951), American baseball coach and manager
  - John F. McLaren (fl. 1855–58), chancellor of the University of Pittsburgh
  - John Francis McLaren (1919–1953), British military pilot
  - John Inglis McLaren (1865–1948), Canadian politician
- Kenneth McLaren (1860–1924), British military commander
- Kyle McLaren (born 1977), Canadian ice hockey player
- Laura McLaren, Baroness Aberconway (1854–1933), British women's rights activist
- Leah McLaren (born 1975), Canadian writer and columnist
- Malcolm McLaren (1946–2010), British music manager
- Martin McLaren (1914–1979), British military commander and politician
- Mick McLaren (1930–2016), Rhodesian military commander
- Norman McLaren (1913–1987), Scottish-born Canadian animator and film director
- Paul McLaren (born 1976), English football player
- Peter McLaren (born 1948), Canadian-born theorist of critical pedagogy
- Richard McLaren (born 1945), Canadian expert on sports law
- Robin McLaren (1934–2010), British diplomat
- Lady Rose McLaren (1919–2005), British aristocrat
- Ross McLaren (1953–2023), Canadian film director
- Ryan McLaren (born 1983), South African cricketer
- Samuel McLaren (1876–1916), Australian mathematician
- Sarah McLaren, New Zealand environmental scientist
- Scott McLaren (born 1968), Australian football referee
- Steve McLaren (born 1975), Canadian ice hockey player
- Stuart McLaren (fl. 1902), Australian rugby union player
- Stuart McLaren (born 1975), Scottish/Australian football player and coach
- Timothy McLaren (born 1956), Australian rower
- Tommy McLaren (1949–1978), Scottish football player
- Walter McLaren (1853–1912), British politician
- Wayne McLaren (1940–1992), American stuntman, model, actor, and rodeo performer
- William McLaren (disambiguation)
  - William McLaren (1887–?), Scottish football player
  - William McLaren (1923–1987), Scottish illustrator
- Willie McLaren (born 1984), Scottish football player

== McClaren ==
- Chris McClaren (born 1963), English footballer
- Edward McClaren (1902–1985), American physician
- Steve McClaren (born 1961), English footballer

== McClarin ==
- Curtis McClarin (1969–2014), American actor
- Jim McClarin (born 1945/1946), American politician

== See also ==
- McLaren (disambiguation)
- MacLaren (surname)
- Baron Aberconway, family name
