= McLaren (disambiguation) =

McLaren is a Formula One racing team, part of the McLaren Group.

McLaren or MacLaren (/məˈklærən/ mə-KLARR-ən) may also refer to:

== Motor vehicles ==
- McLaren F1, a road-going car
- McLaren MP4-12C, a road-going car
- Mercedes-Benz SLR McLaren, a car by Mercedes-Benz and McLaren Automotive

== Organisations ==
- J&H McLaren & Co., a British engineering company
- Maclaren, a manufacturer of baby prams and carriers
- McLaren Group, owner of the Formula One racing team
  - McLaren Automotive
  - McLaren Applied
  - Arrow McLaren, IndyCar team owned by McLaren Racing
- McLaren Health Care Corporation, Michigan, United States
- McLaren Performance Technologies, an automotive engineering company owned by Linamar

== People ==
- McLaren (surname)
- MacLaren (surname)
- Clan MacLaren, a Scottish clan

== Places ==
- John McLaren Park, San Francisco, California, U.S.
- The McLaren Building, in Birmingham, England, UK
- McLaren Creek, a remote community in the Northern Territory, Australia (a.k.a. Mungkarta)
- McLaren Flat, South Australia
- McLaren Park, New Zealand
- McLaren Wharf, wharf and precinct in Port Adelaide, South Australia
- MacLaren Youth Correctional Facility in Woodburn, Oregon, U.S.
- McLaren Technology Centre, in Woking, England, UK

== Other uses ==
- McLaren (film), a 2017 documentary about the life and death of Bruce McLaren
- MacLaren's, a fictional bar in the TV series How I Met Your Mother

== See also ==
- McLaren Vale (disambiguation)
- Maclaurin
- McLaurin
- Swan and Maclaren, an architectural firm in Singapore
