= Henk Hoekstra =

Dutch politician

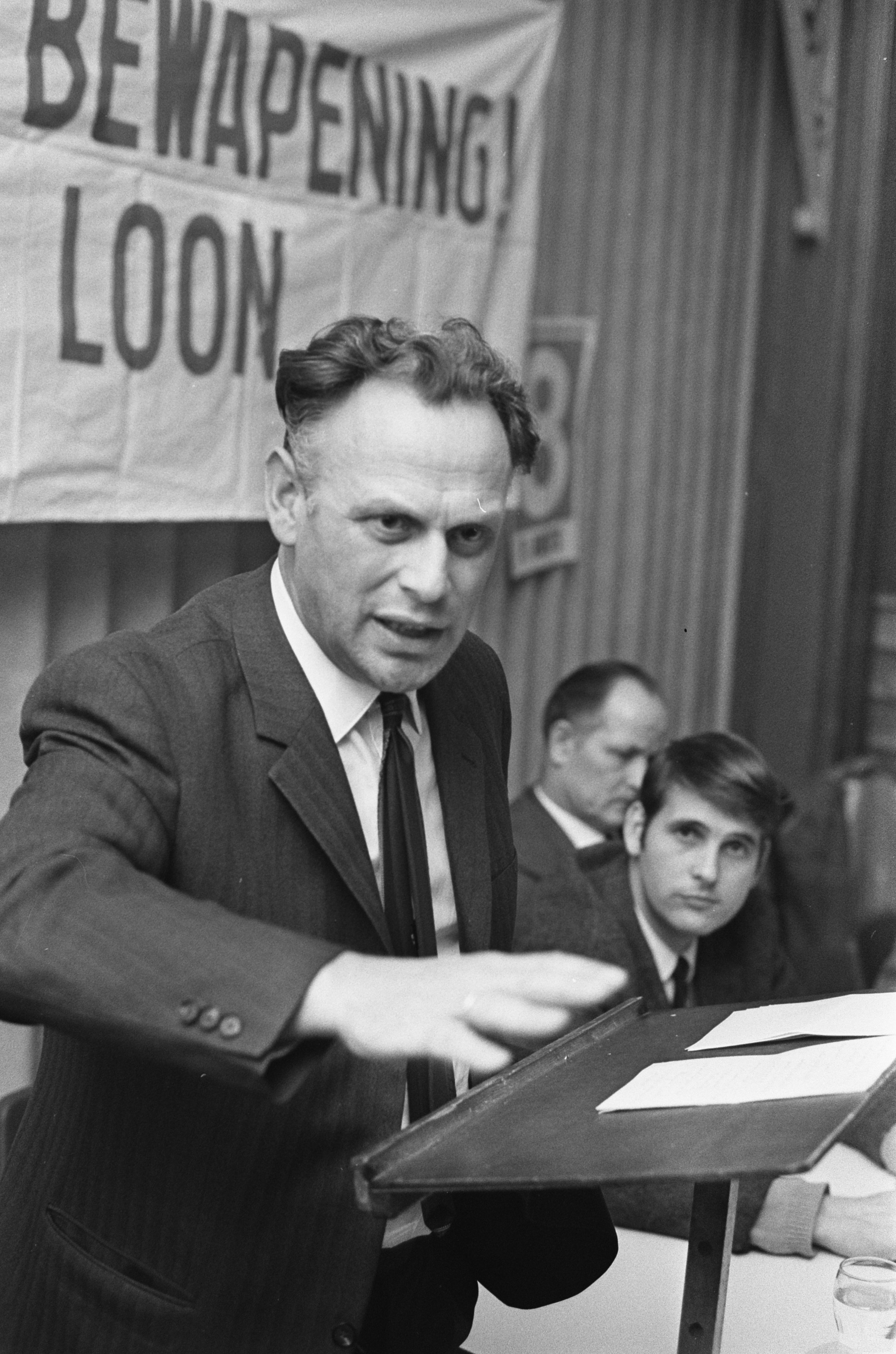
- Hoekstra in 1970

Member of the House of Representatives
- In office 1963–1977

Member of the Senate
- In office 1983–1986

Personal details
- Born: Hendrik Johan Hoekstra; 17 June 1924 Amsterdam
- Died: 10 April 2009 (aged 84) Laren
- Party: CPN

Henk Hoekstra (17 June 1924, Amsterdam – 10 April 2009) was a Dutch politician. Between 1968 and 1982 he served as the chair of the Communist Party of the Netherlands. From 1963 and 1977, he was a member of the House of Representatives, and from 1983 to 1986 he was a member of the Senate.
