= Clan MacLaren =

Highland Scottish clan

- Clann Labhruinn or Clan Labhran
- Crest: A lion's head erased Sable crowned with an ancient crown of six (four visible) points Or, between two branches of laurel issuing from the Wreath at either side of the head both Proper.
- Motto: Ab Origine Fidus ('Faithful from the Beginning')
- Slogan: Creag an Tuirc ('The Boar's Rock')

Profile
- Region: Highlands
- District: Perthshire
- Plant badge: Laurel
- Animal: Lion

Chief
- Florian MacLaren of MacLaren
- The 26th Chief of the Name of MacLaren
- Seat: Kirkton Farm, Balquhidder
- Historic seat: Balquhidder, Strathearn
Septs of Clan MacLaren
M'Laren, Maclaren, MacLaurin, MacLauren, McLaren, McLaurin, McLeran, McLerran, McLaran, McLoran, McLorin, McClaran, McClarin, McClaren, MacClaren, McClarence, McLarence, McLaurence, McLawrence, McClernon, McLarren, Lawrence, Laurence, Lawrin, Law, Lawson, Lawton, Low, Lowe, Lawrie, Laurie, Lorin, Lowery, Lowry, Lowrey, Lowson, Faed, Paterson, Patterson, Pattison, Peterson, Patrick, McPhater, MacPatrick, MacRory, McCrory, McGory, MacRuari, MacGrory, MacIntyre, Wright, McFater
Clan branches
MacLaren of Achleskine (chiefs)
MacLaren of Ardveche
MacLaren of Invernenty
MacLaren of Struthill
MacLaurin of Tiree
Allied clans
Clan Stewart of Appin
Rival clans
Clan MacGregor
Clan Buchanan
Clan MacFarlane
Clan MacDonald of Keppoch
Clan Campbell

Clan MacLaren (Scottish Gaelic: Cinneadh MacLabhrainn) is a Highland Scottish clan. The first matriculation was to John MacLaurin, Lord Dreghorn in 1781. In 1957 The Court of the Lord Lyon granted chiefly arms to Donald MacLaren as a result of a petition filed by Donald MacLaren, with Supporters.

== Etymology of Laurence ==
“Laurence, G. Labhruinn, M.G. Labhras (1467). Ir. Laurint (Saint), from Lat. Laurentius, St Laurence, the ultimate stem being that of lat. Lauras, a laurel. Hence M’Labhruinn, or Mac-laren”

== Traditions ==
Traditional clan lands include the old parish of Balquhidder which includes the villages of Lochearnhead and Strathyre, and is about 18 miles (29 km) long and 7 miles (11 km) broad, spanning 54,675 acres (22,126 ha), long known as "Country of the Maclaurins"

=== Traditions of the origin of the clan ===
The MacLaren Modern tartan.

The chiefly house of MacLaren is said to be descended from Lorn, son of Fergus MacErc, believed to be a ruler of the kingdom of Dál Riata. In the Gaidhlig language, Lorn is Latharna, whilst Laren (Lawrence) is Labhrainn, two different Gaidhlig names.

=== Heraldry Tradition ===
In Scottish Gaelic the clan name is Clann Labhruinn. The heraldry borne by the clan suggests that they descend from a cadet branch of the dynasty of the Earls of Strathearn.

Clan history tells us that the MacLarens fought at the Battle of the Standard under Malise I, Earl of Strathearn, for David I of Scotland.

=== Early MacLaren Tradition ===
Three names are traditionally identified as belonging to the Clan MacLaren are found in the Ragman Rolls of 1296, giving allegiance to Edward I of England. These are Maurice of Tiree, Conan of Balquhidder and Leurin of Ardveche.

There is a differing opinion on whether these three men were McLarens. For example, Leurin of Ardveche is properly Orm de Abernathy, whose heraldic ensign appears to be an oak leaf, not the Earls of Strathearn chevrons. Tiry, Morice de (del counte de Perth) whose surname is derived from the place name in Perthshire “Tyrie” or Tyree, from Tir ith land of grain. The Tyrees lived at Drumkilbo for 300 years.

During the Wars of Scottish Independence it is traditionally thought that the Clan MacLaren fought for Robert the Bruce at the Battle of Bannockburn, under the standard of Malise, Earl of Strathearn in 1314, where the English were defeated. The last Gaelic Earl of Strathearn was deprived of his title in 1344 when the MacLarens came under pressure from their more powerful neighbours.

=== 15th and 16th century Traditions ===
In 1468 the Clan MacLaren fought in support of the Clan Stewart of Appin at the Battle of Stalc. The MacLarens also fought alongside the Stewarts of Appin at the Battle of Black Mount in 1497 or 1498. Balquhidder passed into the hands of the Crown and in 1490 and a Stewart was appointed the royal ballie. (see: Stewart of Balquhidder). Then in 1500 James IV of Scotland granted the lordship to Janet Kennedy, his mistress, and the chief of the Clan MacLaren found that his lands had become part of another barony. Balquhidder would later pass to the Clan Murray of Atholl.

=== McLaren Massacre Tradition ===
The persecution of the Clan Gregor by the Clan Campbell drove the MacGregors from their own lands into Balquidder where the Clan MacLaren lacked the power to stop them. Men, women and children were killed and their homes taken by MacGregors. The MacLaurin memorial stone in Balquhidder kirkyard reads,

'"In memoriam of the Clan Laurin, anciently the allodian inhabitants of Balquhidder and Strathearn, the chief of whom, in the decrepitude of old age, together with his aged and infirm adherents, their wives and children, the widows of their departed kindred— all were destroyed in the silent midnight hour by fire and sword, by the hands, of a banditti of incendiarists from Glendochart, a.d. 1558. Erected by Daniel Maclaurin, Esq. of St John's Wood, London, author of a short history of his own clan, and for the use of his clansmen only. — October 1868."

=== The Civil War Tradition ===
During the Scottish Civil War the Clan MacLaren fought for James Graham, 1st Marquis of Montrose, in support of Charles I of England at the Battle of Inverlochy (1645), Battle of Auldearn, Battle of Alford and the Battle of Kilsyth.

In 1689 the Clan MacLaren again fought for the Stuart cause, this time under John Graham, 1st Viscount Dundee, at the Battle of Killiecrankie.

George Way of Plean and Romilly Squire, authors of Scottish Clan and Family Encyclopedia, give us the above battle claims, and questionable scholarship, MacLaren tradition concerning Killirkrankie, found in The MacLarens, by Margaret MacLaren, is that the Stewarts of Appin went to Loch Earn, in Balquhidder, 60 miles away, to gather the McLarens and fish, before going to the Battle of Killiekrankie. MacLaren's source for this statement on page 64 of The MacLarens, is The Grameid, where it is footnoted. The Grameid, is a poem written in Latin by James Philip, about the Battle of Killiekrankie. MacLaren wrote this excerpt from The Grameid "Littora piscosae contermina linguit lernae", inferring that lernae is Loch Earn in Balquhidder. Margaret changed the text of The Grameid, in her footnote. The Grameid actually states "Littora piscosae contermina linguit levna", not "lernae". Levna is possibly Loch Etive in Appin or Loch Leven.

=== Murder of vicar Johannis McLauren ===
In 1533 Johannis McLauren, vicar of Balquhidder was murdered by his two nephews and one of their sons. They were from Breadalbane. Nicholaii McKinreauch McLaure was the leader, and committed the murder along with his son Nigelli Nicholsone McLaure and Nicholaii's first cousin, Duncani Patersone McLaure who lived in Balquhidder. None of these three men are found in the later Clanlawren Bonds, so we can assume they were indeed ‘put to the horn’ outlawed, kill on sight.

"Et de xl li compositionis bonorum eschaetorum Nicholaii McKinreauch McLaure, Nigelli Nicholsone McLaure et suorum filiorum necnon, Duncani Patersone McLaure ad cornu regis existentium pro interfectione quondam domini Johannis McLaure vicarii de Balquhiddir”

"Item, remittit be the Kingis grace with quhilk I am a.d. 1533-4. chargit in my last comptis to James Chesholme of Classingall, the compositioun of the escheit of Nycholl McIlreoch (Nicholaii McKinreauch McLaure) and utheris quhilkis slew the vicar of Bal- quhidder, extending to . . . xl li."

==== March 11, 1559 Balquhidder V’Laurane bond themselves to Glenurchy ====
One of the witnesses is Malcolm M'Coule Keir, Clan Gregor Chief who had signed his own Bond with Colin Campbell two days earlier. Another witness is Gillefillane M’Laurane, a Campbell of Glenurchy Servitor from Clanlawren Breadalbane.

BOND OF MANRENT by Johne M'Olcallum V’Laurane, Laurane M'Olcallum his brother, Malcum elder and Malcum yongar M'Olcallum V’Lauranis brothers to the said Johne, Johne M’Patrik V’Laurane, Neill and Johne M'Lauranis his brothers. Nycoll M'Allyne V’Laurane, Donald M'Neill V’Laurane, John M'Nycoll V’Laurane, Lauchlane M'Ane V’Nycoll, Malcum M'Ane VNycoll, Dugall his brother. Duncane M'Coule V’Lauran, Johne elder, Johne younger, Archibald, Robert, Walter, Donald and Malcum brothers to the said Duncane M'Coule V'Lauran , Patrik M'Ewyn V’Laurane, Duncane his son. Patrik M'Conachy V’Laurane, Robert M'Ane V’Laurane and Ewin M'Gillecrist V’Laurane, dwelling in Balquhidder to Colyne Campbell of Glenurquhay.

Dated before these witnesses Alexander Stewart, William M'Neill V'Ewyn, Gillefillane M'Laurane [Servant of Fillan], John M'Gillespy V'Nab, Finlay M'Anevoill, Malcolm M'Coule Keir (M'Gregor, brother to John McCoul Chere, who is accused of murdering 18 Lauran householders 1558, acquitted in 1602), Malcolm M'Robert, Gillecrist M'Yntallnour Moir and Duncan M'Moreist V'Caus 11 March 1559."

The 1559 bond comes after the Earl of Argyll's transference of the Clanlawren to Campbell of Glenurchy, his uncle on Nov. 8 1559.

Johne M'O'challum V'Laurene's name gives as clue, to the time period (circa 1450) of his grandfather "Laurence", the patronym ancestor of many Balquhidder McLarens.

=== More Murder ===
In 1586, Alexander Stewart 6th of Glenbuckie, whose mother was the daughter of the Auchleskine McLaren clan chief according to Patrick Stewart in 1765, North Carolina. Bonded to Duncan Campbell Glenurchy (who had a collection of beheading axes) for killing Johne Makolchalluin in Comrie. This is the same Johne M'Olcallum V’Laurane who is the first name in the 1559 Bond above. The Ledcreich Stewarts were a branch of the Glenbuckie Stewarts.

Notice at the end, MakRobert and Makindewer, two men who are found in the 1573 Breadalbane Clanlawren Bond and three Balquhidder McLarens listed to confirm the Bond, for the murder of their kinsman, Johne M'Olcallum V’Laurane.

"Bond of Manrent by Alester Stewart in Glenbokie in Buchquhidder, Patrik, (Patrick Stewart, 1st of Ledcriech, son), Duncane, (Duncan Stewart, 7th of Glenbuckie, son), Robert, (Robert Stewart of Broichie, son), James, (James Stewart, son), Johne, and (John Stewart of Voil, natural son), Walter Stewartis his sons, (Walter Stewart, natural, illegitimate son), James Stewart in Glenfinglas, Johne,Duncane and Alester Stewartis his sons, Walter Stew art in Balliefoyille and (natural, illegitimate son of Patrick Stewart, 2nd of Glenbuckie) Robert Stewart his son, Johne Dow Stewart son to Patrik Stewart in Dallielaggane [Stewarts of Glenbuckie] to Duncane Campbell of Glenurquhay and his heirs, and that because a certain number of them had upon suddantie slain Johne Makolchalluin Comrie (Johne Makolchalluin V’Laurent) who and his forbears was kynd mynd and servants to the said Duncane Campbell of Glenurquhay and his predecessors ; they, being maist willing to repair his honour, bind them severally, to give him and his heirs a free gift of the best audit at the time of their decease, which is called a Calp, besides that due to the Earls of Argyle, and to be true men and servants to him and his against all persons, the authority the Earls of Argyle and the masters of their mailings lands and steadings alone excepted, and to be ready to them in hosting and hunting when required, and to supply reasonable help, according to their power, in any honourable turn tending to the relief of lands or otherwise for the honour of the said Duncane Campbell's house and furtherance of the same : Evin Dow Campbell of the Likkis, Johne Roy Makinstalker in Cranduycht (Crannich) (Campbell of Glenurchy Sevitor who is found as a witness in several Bonds of Manrent), Archebald Campbell fiar of Monze, James Campbell apparent of Laweris, Johne Hendrysone, Donald Makrobert (1573 Breadalbane Clanlaurane Bond) in Candroquhat (Kindrochit, Ardtalnaig, Loch Tay), Johne Makindewer in Portbane (1573 Breadalbane Clanlawren Bond, witness M’Dougall Bond 1581), Patrik M'Robert V'Laurent in the Port at the east end of Locherne (1606 Bond, father Robert 1559 Bond), Donald Maklaurene in Dalbeyich (the first mention of McLarens at Dalveich on the north shore of Loch Earn) and Finlay Makneill V'Laurent in Auchaliskin in Balquhidder (son of Neill in 1559 Balquhidder Bond) witnesses. At Illanrane 28 April 1586."

=== Surname and location conflation ===
"The Crown continued to regard the MacLarens as an independent clan as they are listed in the Acts of Parliament in 1587 and 1594, for the suppression of unruly clans."

That statement, found in the Scottish Clan and Family Encyclopedia, replaced the Breadalbane Clanlawren, with Balquhidder McLarens.

"The Roll of the Clannis (In the Hielandis and Iles) that hes Capitanes, Cheiffis, and Chiftanes quhome on thay depend, oft tymes aganis The willis of thair Landislordis: and of sum special personis of branches of the saidis Clannis, in 1587"

"Oure Soverane Lord and his estaitis in this present Parliament, considering that, nochtwithstanding the sindrie actis maid be his Hienes, and his maist nobill progenitouris, for punischment of the authoris of thift, reiff, oppressioun, and sorning, and masteris and sustenaries of thevis; yet sic hes bene, and presentlie is, the barbarous cruelties and day;ie heirschippis of the wickit thevis and lymmaris of the clannis and surenames following, inhabiting the Hielands and Iles; They ar to day:-"

=== The last V'Lauren Bond to Glenurchy is in 1606 ===
"The last known Bond by Balquhidder V’Laurent families, verified by Malcolme M’Robert and Patrick M’Couill (M’Dougall). Malcome M'Robert in Craig in Ardtollony (Ardtalnaig, Loch Tay) and Patrik M'Couill in Derrie in Buchquedir, each of them aged ninety five years, declare that the deceased James M'Olchallum V'Laurent in Bomuk, Johne M'Olchallum V'Laurent there, (1559 bond, murdered 1586),Patrik M'Olchallum V'Laurent in Careglen (Carroglen, Cregan 1613), and Robert M'Olchallum V'Laurent in Kingart, (Murdered: see Pitcairn 1613 trial, burning of Ardveich, Strathearn), disponed to the last deceased Colene Campbell of Glenurquhay and his heirs their Manrents and Calps; and thereforePatrik M'Robert V'Laurent in the Port at the east end of Locherne, James M'Laurent in Laggan son to the said deceased Johne M'Olchallum,And Thomas M'Laurent in Carnelea in Buchquhedir,grandsons, sons, and nephews to the persons abovewritten, ratify the said bond, and of new give their bonds of Manrent and Calps to Sir Duncane Campbell of Glenurquhay knight and his heirs ; Jo hne M'Carlich in Finlarg, (Craignish Campbell), Molchallum M'Robert in Craig, Donald M'Ean Duy in Derreyne, Paule M’Clerich, Gavine Hammiltoun notary, Paule M'Clerich in Edinkip witnesses. At Finlarg 28 December 1606."

=== McLarens / McGregors same thing ===
In 1649, a second Decree against Clan Gregor included four Strathyre McLarens. Out of one-hundred-forty-seven mostly MacGregors including Chiefs, Tutors etc. from a wide area, basically a later proscription against the Clan Gregor after the 1602 proscription. Obviously some McLarens leaned in favor of McGregor politics.

“Robert M'Clairen in Corriechrombie [111], John McPatrik in Anie [112], Archibald McLaran [113] his brother there, John Dow McRobert McCleran [114] in Stank"

=== The Jacobite Cause ===
==== Jacobite rising of 1715 ====
During the Jacobite rising of 1715 the Clan MacLaren fought at the Battle of Sheriffmuir in support of the Jacobite cause.

==== Jacobite rising of 1745 ====
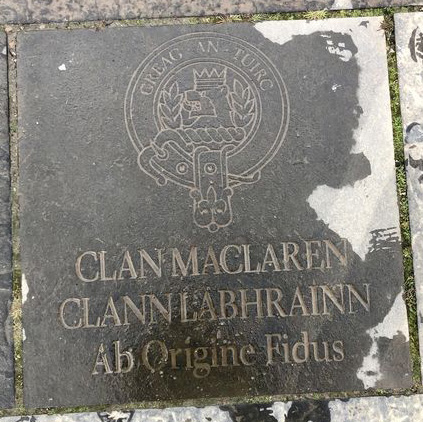
Clan MacLaren Memorial Stone at Culloden

During the Jacobite rising of 1745 the Clan MacLaren fought in support of the Jacobite cause at the Battle of Prestonpans and the Battle of Falkirk Muir where they were victorious on both occasions. The Clan was also present at the Battle of Culloden in 1746 where the Jacobite army met defeat. Indigenous to Appin McLaurins served in the Stewart of Appin Clan Regiment. Balquhidder and Glen Almond McLarens were with Lord George Murray's Regiment.

===== Donald McLaren of Easter Invernenty =====
In 1867, William Anderson writes the quotation below in The Scottish Nation, describing the whereabouts, of the two different Maclaurin kindreds who participated in the 45'. The indigenous McLaurin kindred in the Appin Regiment, and the Balquhidder men in the Atholl Regiment. Anderson then mentions Maclaurin of Invernenty (Balquhidder) is with Appin, without mention any source.

"The Maclaurins were out in the rebellion of 1745. According to President Forbes, they were followers of the Murrays of Athol, but although some of them might have been so, the majority of the clan fought for the Pretender with the Stewarts of Appin under Stewart of Ardsheil. Among them Maclaurin of Invernenty, who was taken prisoner after the battle of Culloden." Wiliiam Anderson

"In the '45 most of this clan served in the Appin Regiment, and were commanded by Captain Donald MacLaurin of Invernenty. They suffered considerably at Culloden, losing thirteen killed and many wounded." Bruce Gordon Seton

Seton was influenced by Anderson and Alexander 8th of Invernayhle's Casualty List, that was only available in The Stewarts of Appin, 1880, the self-published by later Appin Stewarts clan history book, that includes in the 'Casualty List' which includes the thirteen M'Larens, killed at Culloden. The Stewarts of Appin, also states on page 135, that the Appin clan chief Dugald Stewart was a minor in 1745, which is not true, he was an adult. The Stewarts of Appin then states on the same page that a contingent of M'Larens was sent to join their regiment.

The Appin McLaurins, were commanded by the Stewart landlords on whose estate they lived, spread among the different Appin companies, although it would not be remiss to suggest that when it came down to the day of the Culloden battle, brothers, cousins, fathers and sons were shoulder to shoulder, no matter which company they were assigned to.

In 1952, the Order Book of The Stewart of Appin Clan Regiment was transcribed by C. Stewart Henderson. In his list of company officers, Henderson wrote that Donald McLaren of East Invernentie, Balquhidder was a captain, and then recites the story of Donald's capture, found in Rosebery.

In the summer of 1746, after Culloden, Donald McLaren was captured with several other Atholl and MacGregor Regiment men in the Braes of Leny.

During the course of that transport MacLaren was freed or freed himself (the escape has been related both ways) and escaped by throwing himself off a cliff called the Devil's Beef Tub near Moffet. Although the King's dragoons fired after him, the mist hid his movements and his escape was successful. He remained in hiding as a fugitive in Balquhidder until the amnesty of 1757.

===== Other McLaren Jacobites =====
Finlay McLaren was with Lord George Murray's Regiment he had been captured shortly after Culloden and was in Leith prison in May 1746

Lawrence M'Laren another Atholl man from Perth was discharged on bail in July, 1746. Niall M'Laren served in the Duke of Atholl's Regiment, he went to Carlisle after he was captured and then was acquitted.

There were other Balquhidder McLarens who came out for the '45. Most serving in the Atholl Brigade. Jacobite rising of 1745:

Lieutenants
Alexander McLaren, younger of East Haugh, Pitlochry,

Duncan McLaren (Donald of Invernenty's brother), Brewer, Wester Invernentie, Balquhidder; Duke of Atholl's Regiment, after his capture he was transported to Carlilse

Orrott McLaren, Uncle to Younger of East Haugh, Pitlochry, Strath Tay

Other Ranks
Donald McLaren, Tenant, Dowally, Strath Tay;.
James McLaren, Servant to Haugh of Killmorich, Strath Tay,.
John McLaren, Cottar, Rotmell, Strath Tay;.
Robert McLaren, (Whitefield's).

== Crest Badge ==
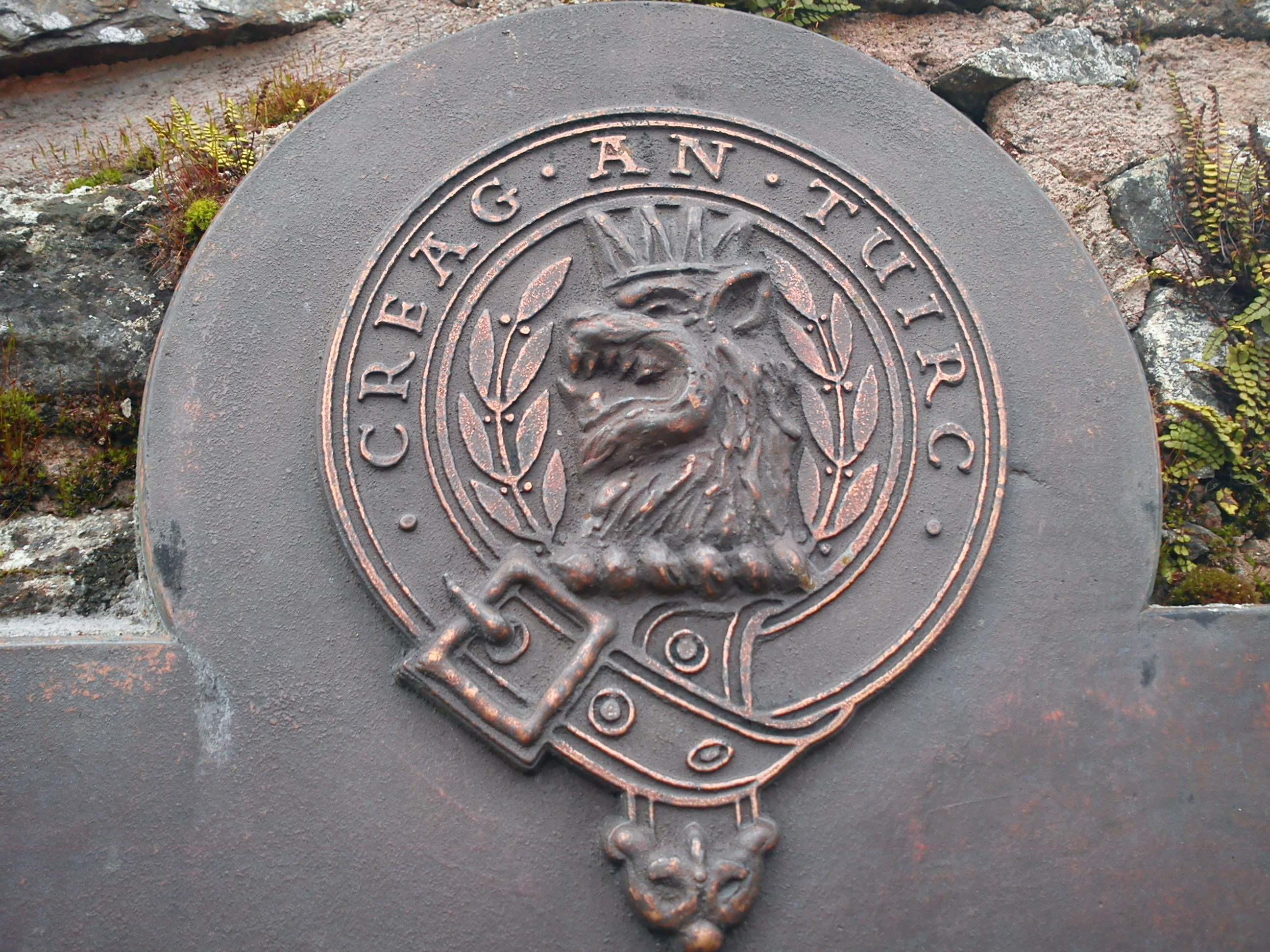
The MacLaren clan crest on the 'old kirk' wall.

The crest badge suitable for members of Clan to wear consists of the heraldic crest and slogan. The crest is: A lion's head erased Sable crowned with an antique crown of six (four visible) points Or, between two branches of laurel issuing from the Wreath at either side of the head both Proper. The slogan within the crest badge is CREAG AN TUIRC, which translates from Scottish Gaelic as "The Boars Rock".

== Clan Badge ==
The clan badge is a laurel branch.

== Tartan ==
Tartan MacLaren

The MacLaren tartan colors are dark green, navy blue, yellow, red and black.

The MacLaren tartan was adopted by Scouts in 1921 for William de Bois Maclaren, who donated Gilwell Park to the Scouting Association. The MacLaren tartan was adopted by the Scouts as a way of honoring MacLaren for his donation to the Scouts and, as per World Organization of the Scout Movement, is worn by Scouts the world over.

== Chiefly House of Auchleskine ==
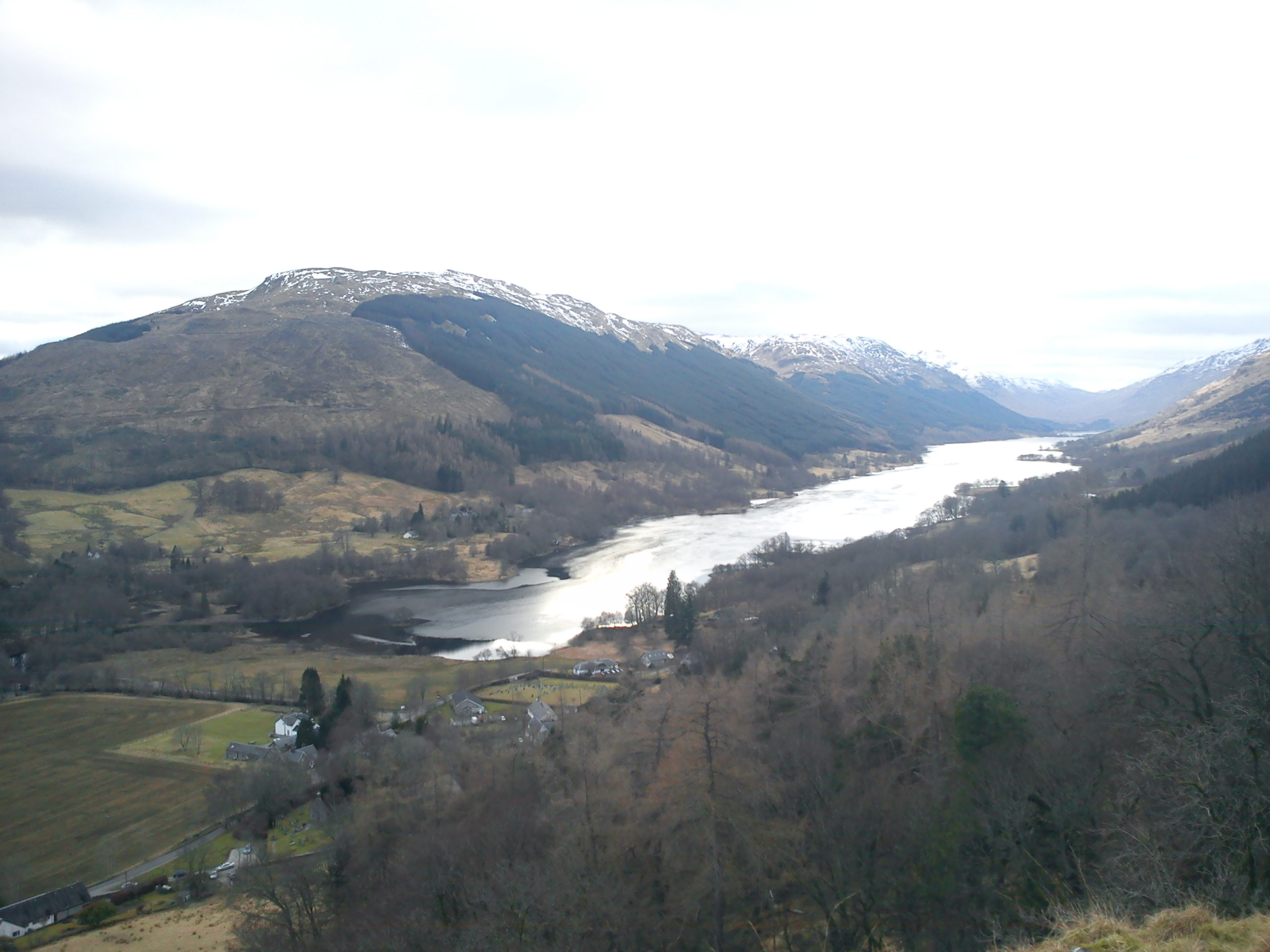
Balquhidder from Creag an Tuirc, the gathering place of the Clan MacLaren

That Auchleskine was the McLaren chiefly house was first stated by Patrick Stewart, 5th of Ledcreich, in 1763. Stewart was a staunch jacobite who after the 1715 Rebellion sold his property Ledcreich, in Balquhidder and immigrated in 1739. They landed at Wilmington, North Carolina and first resided at Brown's Marsh, Bladen county, N. C, and about 1766-67 Patrick removed to near Cheraws, S. C, where he died about 1772.

Patrick Stewart dictated his lineage to his son, Charles Stewart on January 18, 1763, it states:

"that his paternal ancestor Duncan Stewart, 3rd of Glenbuckie married the daughter of an Auchleskine McLaren, the chief of the clan McLaren,"

In 1958 Donald MacLaren of MacLaren and Achleskine successfully matriculated his Arms at the Lyon Court. He also purchased land in Balquhidder, including Creag an Tuirc (the "Boar's Rock"), the traditional rallying point of the Clan. The label "chiefless and landless" was finally removed.

Following his death, Donald's son Donald succeeded as chief in 1966.

After Donald's death in 2023 his son Florian was invested as the new chief on July 25, 2026.

== See also ==
- MacLaren (surname)
- McLaren (surname)
- Maclaurin
