= William McLaren =

William McLaren may refer to:

== Sports ==
- Bill McLaren (1923–2010), Scottish rugby union player and commentator
- Billy McLaren (born 1948), Scottish football player and manager
- William McLaren (footballer) (1887–?), Scottish footballer (Cowdenbeath, Huddersfield Town)
- William McLaren (sport shooter) (1881–1962), Canadian Olympic sports shooter
- Willie McLaren (born 1984), Scottish footballer
- Willie McLaren (1930s footballer), Scottish footballer

== Others ==
- William McLaren (illustrator) (1923–1987), Scottish illustrator
- William Edward McLaren (1831–1905), Bishop of Chicago, Illinois
- Bill McLaren (public servant) (1898–1973), Australian public servant in the Department of the Interior

== See also ==
- William McLaren Bristol (1860–1935), co-founder of Bristol-Myers Squibb
