= McLaurin =

McLaurin is a surname. Notable people with the surname include:

- Anselm J. McLaurin (1848–1909), American politician from Mississippi
- Bette McLaurin, American singer
- Daisy McLaurin (1875–1950), American socialite and clubwoman
- John L. McLaurin (1860–1934), American politician from South Carolina
- Marcus McLaurin, American comic-book writer
- Ralph McLaurin (1885–1943), American baseball player and coach
- Terry McLaurin (born 1996), American football player
- Virginia McLaurin (1909-2022), American social worker
- Colin MacLaurin (1698–1764), also spelt McLaurin, Scottish mathematician noted for the mathematical series named after him

== See also ==
- McLaurin, Mississippi, unincorporated community, United States
- Maclaurin
- Clan MacLaren
- McLaurin v. Oklahoma State Regents, US Supreme Court Decision, 1950
