= McLaren Vale (disambiguation) =

McLaren Vale is a wine region in South Australia

McLaren Vale may also refer to:

- McLaren Vale, South Australia, a town and locality
- McLaren Vale Football Club, a former Australian rules football team in South Australia
- McLaren Vale railway station, a former railway station in South Australia

== See also ==
- McLaren (disambiguation)
