= Battle of Stalc =

- Part of the Scottish clan wars
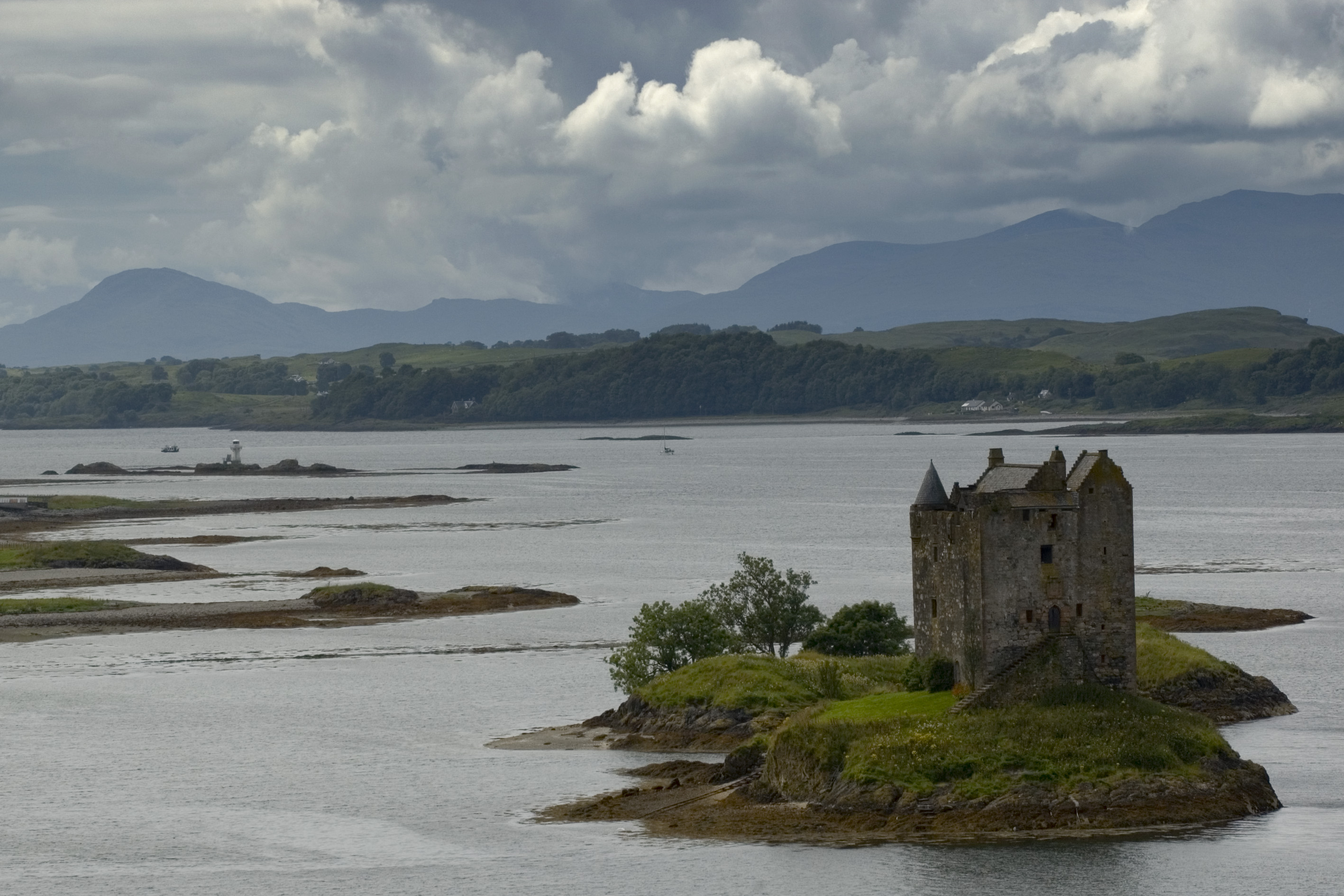
- Castle Stalker, where Dugald Stewart of Appin consolidated his power
Date	1468
Location	Stalc, Argyll, Scotland
Result	Clan Stewart of Appin victory

Belligerents
Clan Stewart of Appin; Clan MacLaren	Clan MacDougall; Clan MacFarlane; Clan Campbell

Commanders and leaders
Dugald Stewart	Walter Stewart; Colin Campbell; Alan MacDougall (or MacCaul) (KIA)

Casualties and losses
130 MacLarens killed	MacFarlanes "virtually destroyed" in military strength

The Battle of Stalc was a Scottish clan battle that was fought in the year 1468. It was fought between the forces of the Clan Stewart of Appin and their allies the Clan MacLaren against the Clan MacDougall and the Clan MacFarlane. The latter force may have included men from the Clan Campbell.

== Background ==
In 1463 John Stewart, Lord of Lorne, was murdered at Dunstaffnage Castle by Alan MacCaul, or MacDougall, and his supporters. As a result, the right of John Stewart's son, Dugald Stewart, to succeed was disputed.

Over the next few years Dugald lost the title of Lord of Lorne through the treachery of his uncle Walter Stewart and also the Lord of Argyll. However, he had retained Appin and Lismore, and consolidated his power and fortified the hunting lodge which later became Castle Stalker on the Cormorant's Rock in Loch Liach. His clan also kept up regular raids on the Campbell territory that surrounded Appin.

== Battle ==
In 1468 the feud culminated in the bloody Battle of Stalc. Colin Campbell and Walter Stewart had organized a massive raid against Dugald Stewart and his clan. Alan MacCaul (or MacDougall) was also involved. Dugald Stewart gathered his men, and as the enemy approached he sent his men out along a ridge, which gave him the advantage of ground.

Although Dugald lost many men, he virtually destroyed the military strength of the MacFarlanes, which they never recovered from. 130 of the MacLarens also fell in the battle. Alan MacDougall, or MacCaul, murderer of John Stewart, was killed in the battle, apparently by Dugald himself.

However, according to 21st-century historian Walter MacDougall, it is not entirely clear what happened to Alan MacCaul (MacCoul), but if he did die in the battle that the Scottish Gaelic name of the place where the fight took place, "Lagna an Phail", which translates as "treacherous hollow", was a fitting place for his final moments.

== Aftermath ==
In the autumn of 1469, Dugald Stewart gave up his claim to Lorne to his uncle, Walter Stewart, in order to hold Appin. However, the battle had solidified Dugald's claim to Appin and the surrounding area, and it was formally granted to him by James III of Scotland on 14 April 1470. However, Dugald was later killed in battle in 1497 or 1498 fighting against the Clan MacDonald of Keppoch, at the Battle of Black Mount.

== See also ==
- Clan Stewart of Appin
- Lord of Lorne
