= Laren =

Laren may refer to:

== Places ==
- Laarne, municipality located in the Belgian province of East Flanders, earlier referenced as Laren
- Laren, Gelderland, village in the Dutch municipality of Lochem
- Laren, North Holland, municipality and town in the Netherlands

== People ==
- Laren, a character from the Freddi Fish series
- Laren Sims (1966-2002), American criminal charged with first-degree murder in the death of her husband, California attorney Larry McNabney
- Laren Stover, American author
- Ro Laren, fictional character on the television series Star Trek: The Next Generation

== See also ==
- McLaren (disambiguation)
