= James MacLaren =

James MacLaren may refer to:

- James Maclaren (1818–1892), early settler and entrepreneur in western Quebec
- James Roland MacLaren (1839–1912), British actor and playwright
- James MacLaren (architect) (1853–1890), Scottish architect
- James MacLaren (cricketer) (1870–1952), English cricketer
- Jim MacLaren (1963–2010), American motivational speaker and author

== See also ==
- James McLaren (disambiguation)
