= Sarah McLaren =

New Zealand environmental scientist

- Education: University of Leeds; University of Toronto
- Alma mater: University of Surrey
- Scientific career
- Institutions: University of Surrey; Manaaki Whenua – Landcare Research; Massey University

Sarah J. McLaren is a New Zealand environmental scientist and professor at Massey University.

== Academic career ==
McLaren studied for her BSc (1986) at the University of Leeds and then moved to Canada to the University of Toronto for her MSc (1993). She returned to England and graduated from the University of Surrey with a PhD (1999) and joined their Centre for Environmental Strategy as a researcher.

In December 2005, McLaren moved to New Zealand where she worked for several years at Manaaki Whenua – Landcare Research. She joined the Institute of Agriculture and Environment at Massey University and as of 2021 is Director of the New Zealand Life Cycle Management Centre. She was promoted to full professor at Massey University effective from 1 January 2017.

== Selected publications ==
- Serenella Sala; Assumpcio’ Anton; Sarah J. McLaren; Bruno Notarnicola; Erwan Saouter; Ulf Sonesson (January 2017). "In quest of reducing the environmental impacts of food production and consumption". Journal of Cleaner Production. 140: 387–398. doi:10.1016/J.JCLEPRO.2016.09.054. ISSN 0959-6526. Wikidata Q58086506.
- Agneta Ghose; Sarah J. McLaren; David Dowdell; Robyn Phipps (May 2017). "Environmental assessment of deep energy refurbishment for energy efficiency-case study of an office building in New Zealand". Building and Environment. 117: 274–287. doi:10.1016/J.BUILDENV.2017.03.012. ISSN 0360-1323. Wikidata Q63567609.
- Chanjief Chandrakumar; Arunima Malik; Sarah J. McLaren; Mikołaj Owsianiak; Thiagarajah Ramilan; Nihal P. Jayamaha; Manfred Lenzen (12 March 2020). "Setting Better-Informed Climate Targets for New Zealand: The Influence of Value and Modeling Choices". Environmental Science & Technology. 54 (7): 4515–4527. doi:10.1021/ACS.EST.9B06991. ISSN 0013-936X. PMID 32119772. Wikidata Q89972534.
- Arunima Malik; Chanjief Chandrakumar; Manfred Lenzen; Sarah J. McLaren (15 December 2020). "Re-Examining Climate Policies for Pathways to a Zero Carbon Future". Environmental Science & Technology. 55 (1): 1–3. doi:10.1021/ACS.EST.0C03424. ISSN 0013-936X. PMID 33322896. Wikidata Q104478458.
