= Maclaurin =

Maclaurin or MacLaurin is a surname. Notable people with the surname include:

- Colin Maclaurin (1698–1746), Scottish mathematician
- Normand MacLaurin (1835–1914), Australian politician and university administrator
- Henry Normand MacLaurin (1878–1915), Australian general
- Ian MacLaurin, Baron MacLaurin of Knebworth (b. 1937)
- Richard Cockburn Maclaurin (1870–1920), US physicist and educator

== See also ==
- Taylor series in mathematics, a special case of which is the Maclaurin series
- Maclaurin (crater), a crater on the Moon
- McLaurin (disambiguation)
- MacLaren (surname)
- McLaren (disambiguation)
