= John McLaren =

John McLaren may refer to:

- John McLaren (baseball) (born 1951), American baseball manager
- John McLaren (cricketer) (1886–1921), Australian cricketer
- John McLaren (horticulturist) (1846–1943), built Golden Gate Park
- John McLaren (public servant) (1871–1958), Australian public servant
- John McLaren, Lord McLaren (1831–1910), Scottish Liberal MP and judge
- John Inglis McLaren (1865–1948), Canadian politician
- John Francis McLaren (1919–1953), Welsh barrister and RAF officer
- John F. McLaren (1855–1888), Chancellor of the University of Pittsburgh
- John P. McLaren, U.S. Army general
