= MacLaren (surname) =

MacLaren or Maclaren is a surname of Scottish origin. The name is an Anglicisation of the Gaelic Mac Labhrainn meaning "son of Labhrann". The Gaelic personal name Labhrann is a Gaelicised form of Lawrence.

== People with the surname MacLaren ==
- Alexander Maclaren (1826–1910), Scottish-English non-conformist minister
- Alexander Ferguson MacLaren (1854–1917), Canadian manufacturer, exporter and politician
- Andrew MacLaren (1883–1975), British politician
- Archibald MacLaren (1820–1884), gymnast, fencing master and author
- Archie MacLaren (1871–1944), English cricketer
- Charles Maclaren (1782–1866), Scottish journalist and geologist
- David Laurence MacLaren (1893–1960), Canadian politician, Lieutenant Governor of New Brunswick
- Dave MacLaren (1934–2016), Scottish retired football player and manager
- Donald MacLaren (1893–1988), Canadian World War I flying ace
- Geoffrey MacLaren (1883–1966), English cricketer
- Ian Maclaren (pseudonym of Rev. John Watson, 1850–1907), Scottish author and theologian
- Jack MacLaren, Canadian politician
- James MacLaren (disambiguation)
- Jamie Maclaren (born 1993), Australian footballer
- Jim MacLaren (1963–2010), American motivational speaker and author
- Jimmy MacLaren (1921–2004), English footballer
- Julian MacLaren-Ross (1912–1964), British novelist
- Leon MacLaren (1910–1994), British barrister, politician and philosopher
- Lynn MacLaren (born 1962), Australian politician
- Mary MacLaren (1896–1985), American film actress
- Michelle MacLaren, Canadian television director and producer
- Murray MacLaren (1861–1942), Canadian politician, Lieutenant Governor of New Brunswick
- Owen Finlay Maclaren (1907–1978), English design engineer
- Rachael McLaren, Canadian dancer
- Ross MacLaren (born 1962), British former football player and coach
- Roy MacLaren (footballer) (1930–2022), Scottish footballer
- Roy MacLaren (politician) (born 1934), Canadian politician
- Sarah F. Maclaren (born 1964), Anglo-Italian cultural theorist, sociologist and anthropologist
- Stewart MacLaren (born 1953), Scottish former footballer
- Thomas MacLaren (architect) (1863–1928), Scottish architect
- William MacLaren (1844–?), English rugby union international
- William Scott Maclaren (1845–1909), political figure in Quebec
- William de Bois Maclaren (1856–1921), Scottish publisher, businessman and Scout Commissioner

== See also ==
- McLaren (surname)
