= Battle of Black Mount =

Scottish clan battle (1497 or 1498)

- Part of the Scottish clan wars
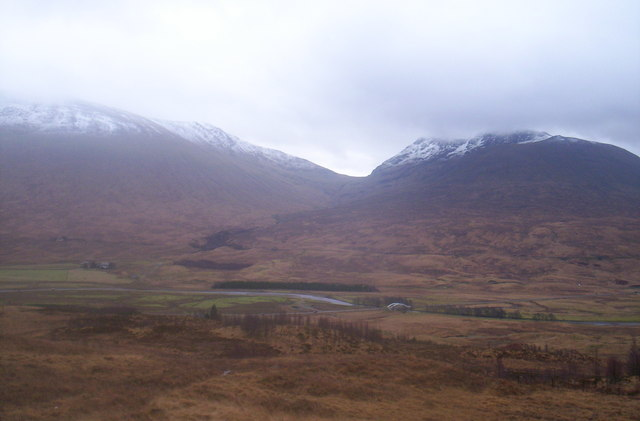
- The Black Mount area
Date	1497 or 1498
Location	Black Mount, Argyll, Scotland
Result	Clan MacDonald of Keppoch victory

Belligerents
Clan Stewart of Appin; Clan MacLaren	Clan MacDonald of Keppoch

Commanders and leaders
Dugald Stewart of Appin (KIA)	MacDonald of Keppoch (KIA)

Casualties and losses
Dugald Stewart of Appin killed, and "many slain"	MacDonald of Keppoch killed, and "many slain"

The Battle of Black Mount, was a Scottish clan battle that took place in 1497 or 1498, in Black Mount which is between Glen Orchy and Glen Coe in the Scottish Highlands. The battle was fought between the Clan Stewart of Appin and their allies the Clan MacLaren against the Clan MacDonald of Keppoch.

== Background ==
The Clan MacLaren had made a raid into the Braes of Lochaber and carried off cattle belonging to the Clan MacDonald of Keppoch. The MacDonalds followed after them and caught up with them at Glen Orchy, where, after a sharp skirmish they recovered the cattle. The MacLarens then sought the assistance of their allies the Clan Stewart of Appin who were led by Dugald Stewart.

== Battle ==
Dugald Steweart instantly raised his men and joined the MacLarens. A battle then took place between the two sides at the Black Mount near the head of Glen Coe. Dugald Stewart, chief of Appin and the chief of the MacDonalds of Keppoch were both killed in the fighting and many were slain on both sides.

== Aftermath ==
Dugald Stewart of Appin was succeeded by his eldest son Duncan who never married. Duncan was therefore succeeded by Dugald's second son, Alan, who fought at and survived the Battle of Flodden in 1513.

== See also ==
- Battle of Stalc
