= James McLaren =

James McLaren may refer to:

- James McLaren (rugby), Scottish rugby player
- James McLaren (footballer) (fl. 1883–1896), Scottish footballer (Hibernian, Celtic, Morton, Clyde and Scotland)
- Jim McLaren (1897–1975), Scottish footballer

== See also ==
- James MacLaren (disambiguation)
