= Geoffrey MacLaren =

English cricketer

Personal information
- Born: 28 February 1883; Whalley Range, Manchester, England
- Died: 14 September 1966 (aged 83); Bexhill, Sussex, England

Domestic team information
- Years: Team
- 1902: Lancashire
- FC debut: 11 August 1902 Lancashire v Sussex
- Last FC: 14 August 1902 Lancashire v Surrey

Career statistics
Competition	First-class
Matches	2
Runs scored	7
Batting average	1.75
100s/50s	0/0
Top score	3
Balls bowled	36
Wickets	2
Bowling average	6.50
5 wickets in innings	0
10 wickets in match	0
Best bowling	1/5
Catches/stumpings	1/–
- Source: CricketArchive, 20 April 2008

Geoffrey MacLaren (28 February 1883 – 14 September 1966) was an English cricketer who played first-class cricket for Lancashire in addition to playing three matches for Egypt. His elder brothers Archie and James also played for Lancashire, as did his uncle Alexander Rowley. Archie also played Test cricket for England.

== Biography ==
Born in Whalley Range, Manchester in 1883, Geoffrey MacLaren was educated at Harrow. He played his only two first-class matches for Lancashire during the 1902 English cricket season, both under the captaincy of elder brother Archie.

He later lived in Egypt for a time, playing for Cairo against I Zingari in March 1914, followed by three matches for the Egyptian national side against the same opposition. He died in Sussex in 1966.
