= James MacLaren (cricketer) =

English cricketer

Personal information
- Full name: James Alexander MacLaren
- Born: 4 January 1870; Whalley Range, Manchester, England
- Died: 8 July 1952 (aged 82); Odstock, Salisbury, Wiltshire, England
- Relatives: Archie MacLaren (brother) Geoffrey MacLaren (brother)

Domestic team information
- Years: Team
- 1891–1894: Lancashire

Career statistics
Competition	First-class
Matches	4
Runs scored	9
Batting average	2.25
100s/50s	0/0
Top score	6
Balls bowled	–
Wickets	–
Bowling average	–
5 wickets in innings	–
10 wickets in match	–
Best bowling	–
Catches/stumpings	4/0
- Source: CricketArchive, 3 November 2012

James Alexander MacLaren (4 January 1870 – 8 July 1952) was an English cricketer who played first-class cricket for Lancashire County Cricket Club between 1891 and 1894. Born in Whalley Range, Manchester, and the eldest of seven brothers, MacLaren was a keen cricketer from his youngest days. He was particularly close to his younger brother Archie, who later captained England. He attended Elstree School and Harrow School, where he coached as a cricketer and was later joined by Archie. He also received coaching at Old Trafford Cricket Ground, where his father was treasurer of Lancashire County Cricket Club. He played in the Harrow first team between 1886 and 1888, and was appointed captain in his final year. Upon leaving Harrow, he played on four occasions for Lancashire between 1891 and 1894 but had little success. On one occasion in 1894, he opened the batting with his brother Archie, who was captain of Lancashire by that stage. In 1900, he qualified as a doctor of medicine. He died at the age of 82 following a fall.

== Bibliography ==
- Down, Michael (1981). Archie: A Biography of A. C. MacLaren. London: George Allen & Unwin. ISBN 0-04-796056-6.
