= Robyn Phipps =

New Zealand construction academic

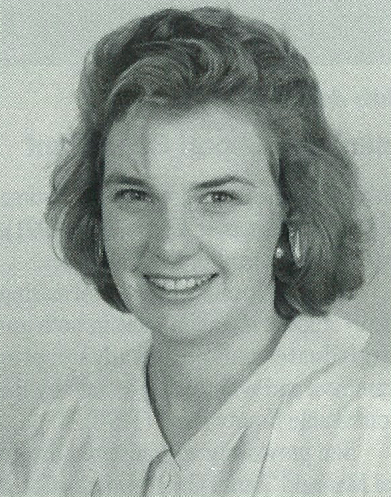
- Phipps in 1991
- Education: Massey University
- Scientific career
- Fields: Construction
- Workplaces: Massey University
- Thesis: Development of a decision support system for the design of good indoor air quality in office buildings (2001)

Robyn A. Phipps is a New Zealand construction academic. She is currently a full professor at Massey University.

== Academic career ==
After a 2001 PhD titled 'Development of a decision support system for the design of good indoor air quality in office buildings' at Massey University, she joined the staff, rising to full professor.

In 2014 Phipps was part of a team that won a Prime Minister’s Science Prize. In 2017 she won a New Zealand Institute of Building award.

== Selected works ==
- Howden-Chapman, Philippa, Nevil Pierse, Sarah Nicholls, Julie Gillespie-Bennett, Helen Viggers, Malcolm Cunningham, Robyn Phipps et al. "Effects of improved home heating on asthma in community dwelling children: randomised controlled trial." BMJ 337 (2008): a1411.
- Phipps, Robyn, Marco Amati, Sue McCoard, and Richard Fisher. "Visual and noise effects reported by residents living close to Manawatu wind farms: preliminary survey results." In New Zealand Planners Institute Conference, Palmerston North, pp. 27–30. 2007.
- Aishah Kamarazaly, Myzatul, Jasper Mbachu, and Robyn Phipps. "Challenges faced by facilities managers in the Australasian universities." Journal of facilities management 11, no. 2 (2013): 136–151.
- Frei, Marcel, Jasper Mbachu, and Robyn Phipps. "Critical success factors, opportunities and threats of the cost management profession: the case of Australasian quantity surveying firms." International Journal of Project Organisation and Management 7 5, no. 1-2 (2013): 4-24.
- Boulic, Mikael, Robyn Anne Phipps, Malcolm Cunningham, Don John Cleland, Pär Fjällström, Keiko Abe, and Philippa Howden-Chapman. "Heater choice, dampness and mould growth in 26 New Zealand homes: A Study of Propensity for Mould Growth using encapsulated fungal spores." Buildings 5, no. 1 (2015): 149–162.
