= John Inglis McLaren =

Mayor of Hamilton, Ontario from 1909 to 1910

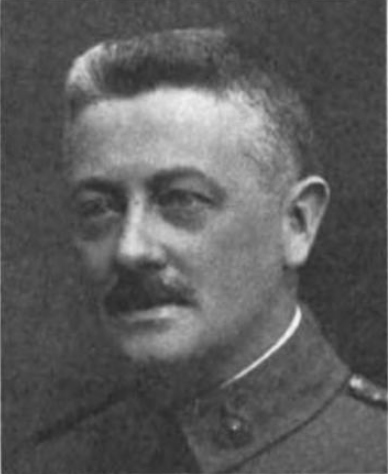

Mayor of Hamilton, Ontario
- In office 1909–1910

Personal details
- Born: September 2, 1865 Goderich, Canada West
- Died: December 8, 1948 (aged 83) Hamilton, Ontario
- Party: Liberal
- Spouse: Bessie S. McClure (m. 1892)
- Children: 6
- Occupation: Lawyer, politician

John Inglis McLaren (September 2, 1865 – December 8, 1948) was mayor of Hamilton, Ontario from 1909 to 1910.

== Biography ==
John Inglis McLaren was born in Goderich, Canada West on September 2, 1865. He moved to Hamilton in 1879, and managed the Hamilton Coffee & Spice Company for 18 years. He married Bessie S. McClure in June 1892, and they had six children.

He was an alderman of Hamilton from 1907 to 1908, and was elected mayor in 1909 and 1910. He unsuccessfully ran for the House of Commons in 1911 and 1917.

McLaren was a principal organizer of the 91st Canadian Highlanders (now designated The Argyll and Sutherland Highlanders of Canada (Princess Louise's)), and became a lieutenant colonel on April 2, 1912. He led the unit in combat during World War I.

He died in Hamilton on December 8, 1948.
