= William McLaren (illustrator) =

Scottish illustrator (1923–1987)

William McLaren (1923–1987) was a Scottish illustrator.

== Life ==
Born in Ferniegair, Hamilton, McLaren grew up in Cardenden, Fife, Scotland with a crippling handicap that affected his feet. He attended Beath High School, Cowdenbeath, before going to college in Edinburgh. In 1944 he earned his Diploma and the Highly Commended Post Diploma from Edinburgh College of Art. After graduation and with a bursary from the Andrew Grant Fund he left Scotland and visited Italy and France. Throughout his life he remained a francophile and was fluent in French.

He earned a living as a commercial illustrator working for The Radio Times, The Listener and The Sphere. He is noted for illustrating and designing dust jackets for the popular gardening books by Beverley Nichols. He also painted murals at Wemyss Castle, St Adrian's Church in West Wemyss, Hopetoun House, Hawthornden Castle and Tyninghame House.

== Legacy ==
In 2009 a documentary film was made by Jim Hickey and Robin Mitchell about McLaren's life and work entitled 'William McLaren – An Artist Out of Time'. The film was shown at the 2010 Glasgow Film Festival as part of their 'Great Scots' strand before touring Scotland's regional cinemas.

In July 2011 Kirkcaldy Museum and Art Gallery hosted an exhibition called 'New Additions'. The exhibition included works by William McLaren, Anne Redpath and Sir Joseph Noel Paton.
