= Clèir Eilean Ì =

Presbytery of Highlands and Hebrides, Scotland

What follows is a list of Church of Scotland parishes, congregations and places of worship in the Presbytery of Clèir Eilean Ì (Scottish Gaelic pronunciation: [kʰʲl̪ˠɛɾ 'elan i]), which covers the Highlands and Hebrides. The Church of Scotland, the national church of Scotland, divides the country into Presbyteries, which in turn are subdivided into Parishes, each served by a parish church, usually with its own minister. Unions and readjustments may however result in a parish having more than one building, or several parishes sharing a minister (these are known as "linked charges").

== History ==
- Argyll was split into Dunoon, Kintyre, Inveraray and Lorn/Kilmore in 1638.
- Long Island, covering Lewis to Barra, was severed from Skye in 1724.
- Garioch was erected in 1724; most of its parishes were from Dingwall but one was from Lorn.
- Abertarff was erected in 1724.
- Mull was severed from Lorn in 1726.
- Tongue was erected in 1726 from parts of Caithness and Dornoch.
- Long Island was split into Lewis and Uist in 1742.
- Nairn was erected in 1773 from parts of Forres and Inverness.
- Garioch was renamed Lochcarron in 1775.
- Islay & Jura was severed from Kintyre in 1836.
- Islay & Jura was renamed Islay c. 1900.
- Dornoch and Tongue united to form Sutherland in 1961.
- Lorn and Mull reunited to form Lorn & Mull in 1963.
- Inveraray, Islay and Kintyre united to form South Argyll in 1976.
- Lochcarron and Skye united to form Lochcarron-Skye in 1976.
- Elgin, Fordyce and Strathbogie merged to form Moray in 1976.
- Abertarff was renamed Lochaber and some parishes moved to Inverness.
- Nairn was merged into Inverness.
- Chanonry, Dingwall and Tain united to form Ross.
- South Argyll, Lorn & Mull, and Dunoon united in 2004 to form Argyll.
- In 2012 South Uist and Barra moved to Argyll.
- Abernethy, Argyll, Caithness, Inverness, Lochaber, Lochcarron-Skye, Ross, Sutherland and Uist plus part of Moray then merged to form the new Clèir Eilean ì in 2024.

== Parishes ==
Parish name	Popn	Location(s) of churches / services held in non-churches	Minister(s)
Abernethy	1,069	Nethy Bridge	Graham Atkinson
Boat of Garten, Carrbridge & Kincardine	1,339	Boat of Garten // Carrbridge	Graham Atkinson
Acharacle and Ardnamurchan	828	Acharacle // Kilchoan	Donald McCorkindale
Ardgour, Morvern and Strontian	1,164	Ardgour // Morvern // Strontian	Donald McCorkindale
Alness	3,268	Alness	Philip Gunn
Alvie and Insh	562	Alvie-Insh // Kincraig	Charles Finnie
Rothiemurchus and Aviemore	3,711	Aviemore	Charles Finnie
Appin and Lismore	693	Appin	Dugald Cameron
Ardchattan	1,661	Benderloch	Willem Bezuidenhout
Coll	195	Arinagour	Willem Bezuidenhout
Connel	1,193	Connel // Dunbeg	Willem Bezuidenhout
Assynt, Rosehall and Scourie	1,583	Lochinver // Rosehall // Scourie	Iain MacLeod
Berneray and Lochmaddy	463	Berneray // Lochmaddy	Alen McCulloch
Kilmuir and Paible	522	Kilmuir North Uist	Alen McCulloch
Black Isle East	4,721	Rosemarkie	Warren Beattie
Bracadale, Duirinish and Snizort	3,458	Bracadale // Duirinish // Kensaleyre // Arnizort // Uig	Gary Wilson
Campbeltown	6,230	Campbeltown	Steven Sass
Saddell and Carradale	563	Carradale	Steven Sass
Southend	408	Southend	Steven Sass
Central and East Sutherland	3,978	Clyne // Lairg // Helmsdale // Rogart	Vacant; Hilary Gardner (AuxM)
Colonsay and Oronsay	132	Scalasaig	Trudi Newton
Netherlorn	1,577	Kilbrandon // Kilchattan // Kilmelford // Craignish	Trudi Newton
Contin	1,000	Contin // Lochluichart	Ronald Gall
Fodderty and Strathpeffer	1,752	Strathpeffer	Ronald Gall
Cowal Kirk	11,388	Dunoon // Kirn // Toward	Evaristo Musedza
Cromdale & Advie	635	Cromdale	Jade MacLean
Grantown on Spey & Dulnain Bridge	2,992	Grantown-on-Spey // Dulnain Bridge	Jade MacLean
Culbokie and Munlochy	4,186	Culbokie	Terry Burns; Carol Rattenbury (OLM)
Culloden and Ardersier	15,597	Ardersier // Culloden	Pamela Kennedy
Dalriada Mid Argyll	5,805	Achahoish // Ardrishaig // Kilmartin // Lochgilphead // Tayvallich	David Carruthers
Dingwall: Castle Street	2,386	Dingwall (Castle Street)	Drausio Goncalves
Dingwall: St Clement's	3,105	Dingwall (St Clement's)	Bruce Dempsey
Dornoch Firth	4,330	Dornoch	Carol Anne Porter
Durness and Kinlochbervie	688	Durness // Kinlochbervie	Andrea Boyes
East Caithness	11,869	Wick // Lybster // Dunbeath?	Vacant; Heather Stewart (OLM)
Easter Ross Peninsula	7,390	Fearn // Tarbat // Tain	Alasdair MacLeod
Ferintosh	4,000	Ferintosh	Stephen Macdonald
Fort Augustus	904	Fort Augustus	Anthony Jones
Glengarry	388	Glengarry // Tomdoun	Anthony Jones
Fort William Kilmallie	10,899	Corpach // Fort William	David Sim; Rory MacLeod (AM)
Kilmonivaig	1,614	Kilmonivaig	David Sim; Rory MacLeod (AM)
Glenorchy and Strathfillan	1,208	Glenorchy // Bridge of Orchy	Vacant
Golspie	1,661	Golspie	John Sterrett
Invergordon	4,600	Invergordon	Vacant
Inverness: Crown	2,752	Inverness (Crown)	Douglas Robertson
Inverness: Hilton	6,873	Inverness (Hilton)	Duncan MacPherson
Inverness: Inshes East	9,143	Inverness (Inshes)	David Scott
Inverness: Kinmylies	6,376	Inverness (Kinmylies)	Scott Polworth
Inverness: Ness Bank	5,186	Inverness (Ness Bank)	Stuart Smith
Inverness: Old High St Stephen's	5,657	Inverness (St Stephen's)	Vacant
Inverness: St Columba	3,837	Boleskine // Inverness (St Columba's)	Scott McRoberts
Inverness: Trinity Dalneigh	10,364	Inverness (Dalneigh)	Vacant
Iona and the Ross of Mull	745	Iona // Kilvickeon	Amanda MacQuarrie
North Mull	2,251	Kilmore // Salen // Tobermory // Torosay	Amanda MacQuarrie
Isle of Bute	6,498	Rothesay	Sibyl Tchaikovsky
Jura	196	Jura	William Hunter
North and West Islay	1,065	Kilchoman	William Hunter
South Islay	2,163	Kilarrow // Port Ellen	William Hunter
Kilchrenan and Dalavich	250	Kilchrenan // Dalavich	Thomas Telfer
Muckairn	1,045	Taynuilt	Thomas Telfer
Killearnan	697	Killearnan	Vacant
Kilmorack and Erchless	2,329	Beauly	Vacant
Kilmore and Oban	9,297	Kilmore // Oban	Alexander MacCallum
Tiree	653	Tiree	Alexander MacCallum
Kilmuir and Logie Easter	1,758	Kilmuir	Alistair Drummond
Kilmuir and Stenscholl	813	Kilmuir Skye // Stenscholl	Beckie Bartocho
Kiltarlity and Kirkhill	3,517	Kiltarlity // Kirkhill	Drew Kuzma
Kiltearn	1,807	Kiltearn	Donald MacSween
Kingussie	2,008	Kingussie // Insh Village	Vacant
Laggan and Newtonmore	1,360	Newtonmore	Vacant
Lochbroom and Ullapool	2,230	Ullapool	Heidi Hercus
Lochgoilhead and Kilmorich	572	Lochgoilhead // Kilmorich	Dorothy Wallace; Sandy Macpherson (OLM)
Strachur and Strathlachlan	752	Strachur // Strathlachlan	Dorothy Wallace; Sandy Macpherson (OLM)
West Lochfyneside	1,539	Inveraray // Furnace // Lochgair	Dorothy Wallace; Sandy Macpherson (OLM)
Manish-Scarista	755	Leverburgh // Manish // Scarista	Vacant
Mid Kintyre and Gigha	1,122	A'Chleit // Clachan // Gigha // Skipness	Lyn Peden
Tarbert (Loch Fyne) and Kilberry	1,354	Tarbert	Lyn Peden
Nairnshire	12,017	Nairn (Old) // Nairn (St Ninian's) // Auldearn	Vacant; Linda Walker (AuxM)
North Coast and the Flows	9,174	Thurso (W.) // Syre // Strathy // Halkirk // Melness // Tongue	Vacant
North West Lochaber	2,117	Mallaig // Arisaig	Vacant
Pentland	3,351	Canisbay // Dunnet // Keiss // Olrig	Janet Easton-Berry
Portree	3,124	Portree	Sandor Fazakas
South Lochaber	2,889	Kinlochleven // Duror // Onich	Malcolm Kinnear; Marion Kinnear (AuxM)
South West Ross	4,315	L'carron // Applecross // Kinlochewe // Glenelg // Kintail // Lochalsh	Frederick Vincent
Strath and Sleat	2,782	Broadford // Sleat // Kyleakin	John Nicolson
Strathnairn and Strathdearn	4,139	Croy // Tomatin	Ruth Kennedy
Tarbert (Harris)	1,161	Tarbert	Ian MacDonald
The Shore Kirk	1,232	Strone	Andrew Robertson
West Cowal	1,064	Clachan of Glendaruel // Kames	Andrew Robertson
Thurso: St Peter's and St Andrew's	3,611	Thurso (St Peter's & St Andrew's)	David Malcolm
Tomintoul, Glenlivet and Inveravon	1,519	Tomintoul	Guardianship
Uist and Barra	5,125	Benbecula // Carinish // Howmore // Daliburgh // Barra	Vacant; Ishabel Macdonald (OLM)
Urquhart and Glenmoriston	2,386	Corrimony // Kilmore	Vacant
Urray and Kilchrist	4,103	Muir of Ord	Monika Redman
West Moray	18,395	Kinloss // Forres // Dallas // Dyke	Vacant; Dewald Louw (Team Min.); Stuart Finlayson (CPM); John Morrison (OLM)
West Ross	2,446	Aultbea // Badcaul // Gairloch	Vacant

CPM = Community Pioneer Minister; OLM = Ordained Local Minister.

=== Abernethy, Carrbridge etc ===
Parish name	Popn	Website	Minister(s)
Abernethy	1,069	Yes	Graham Atkinson
Boat of Garten, Carrbridge and Kincardine	1,339	Yes	Graham Atkinson

- Abernethy Parish Church (1932-)
  - Abernethy and Kincardine Parish Church (c. 1593-1932)
    - St George's Parish Church, Abernethy (ancient-c. 1593)
    - St Katherine's Parish Church, Kincardine-on-Spey (ancient-c. 1593)
  - Abernethy and Boat of Garten Parish Church (1929-1932), formerly Abernethy and Boat of Garten United Free Church (1904-29), formerly Abernethy United Free Church (1900-04), formerly Abernethy Free Church (1855-1900)
- Boat of Garten, Carrbridge and Kincardine Parish Church (2010-)
  - Boat of Garten and Kincardine Parish Church (1934-2010), formerly Boat of Garten Parish Church (1932-34)
  - Duthil Parish Church (1930-2010)
    - Duthil Parish Church (1833-1930), formerly Duthil and Rothiemurchus Parish Church (1625-1833), formerly Duthil Parish Church (1560-1625), formerly St Peter's Parish Church, Duthil, formerly St Duchald's Parish Church, Duthil (ancient-c. 1560)
    - Carrbridge Parish Church (1929-30), formerly Duthil Carrbridge United Free Church (1910s-29), formerly Duthil United Free Church (1900-1910s), formerly Duthil Free Church (1843-1900)

Church	Location	Built	Rebuilt	Closed
Abernethy New (former Free) Church, Nethy Bridge	NJ003204	1850		—
Abernethy Old Church (St George's)	NJ005217	Medieval	1767	2011
St Columba's, Boat of Garten	NH940189	1900	—	—
Carrbridge Church (formerly Duthil Free)	NH906226	1909	—	—
St Tomhaldaich's or St Katherine's, Kincardine	NH938155	Medieval	post-C16th	c. 2023
Duthil Old Church	NH935243	Medieval	1826	1967

== Congregational history ==
- Acharacle and Ardnamurchan Parish Church (2023-)
  - Acharacle Parish Church (1930-2023)
    - Acharacle Parish Church (1859-1930), formerly Acharacle Parliamentary Chapel (1833-59)
    - Acharacle, Ardnamurchan and Strontian United Free Church (1907-30)
      - Acharacle United Free Church (1900-07), formerly Acharacle Free Church (1876-1900)
      - Ardnamurchan United Free Church (1900-07), formerly Ardnamurchan Free Church (1873-1900)
      - Strontian United Free Church (1900-07), formerly Strontian Free Church (1843-1900)
  - Ardnamurchan Parish Church (1919-2023), formerly Ardnamurchan, Eilean Finain and Arisaig Parish Church (1614-1919)
    - St Coan's Parish Church, Ardnamurchan or Kilchoan (ancient-1614)
    - St Finan's Parish Church, Eilean Finain (ancient-1614)
- Alness Parish Church (2024-)
  - Alness Parish Church (1929-2024)
    - Alness Parish Church (ancient-1929)
    - Alness United Free Church (1900-29), formerly Alness Free Church (1843-1900)
  - Rosskeen Parish Church (1943-2024)
    - Rosskeen East Parish Church (1929-43), formerly Rosskeen Parish Church (C16th-1929)
      - St Ninian's Parish Church, Nonakiln or Nonekill (ancient-C16th)
      - St Ninian's Parish Church, Rosskeen (ancient-C16th)
    - Rosskeen West Parish Church (1929-43), formerly Rosskeen United Free Church (1900-29), formerly Rosskeen Free Church (1843-1900)
- Alvie and Insh Parish Church (1932-)
  - Alvie Parish Church (1636-72, 1708-1932), formerly Alvie and Laggan Parish Church (1572-1636, 1672-1708), formerly St Drostan's Parish Church, Alvie or Skeiralvie (ancient-1572)
  - Insh Parish Church (1869-1932), formerly Insh Parliamentary Church (1830-69), formerly St Adamnan's Parish Church, Innis Eoghain (ancient-1580)
  - Kincraig Parish Church (1929-1932), formerly Alvie United Free Church (1902-29), formerly Alvie and Rothiemurchus United Free Church (1900-02), formerly Alvie and Rothiemurchus Free Church (1850s-1900), formerly Alvie Free Church (1843-1850s)
- Appin and Lismore Parish Church (2024-)
  - Appin Parish Church (1933-2024)
    - Appin Parish Church (1868-1933)
    - Appin St Moluag's Parish Church (1929-33), formerly Appin United Free Church (1900-19, 1924-29), formerly Appin and Lismore United Free Church (1919-24), formerly Appin Free Church (1890-1900), formerly Lismore and Appin Free Church (1859-90)
  - Lismore Parish Church (C16th-2024), formerly St Luag's Cathedral Church, Lismore or Kilmaluag (ancient-C16th)
- Ardchattan Parish Church (1934-)
  - Ardchattan Parish Church (1846-1934), formerly Ardchattan and Muckairn Parish Church (1618-1846), formerly St Modan's Parish Church, Ardchattan (ancient-1618)
  - Benderloch Parish Church (1929-34), formerly Ardchattan and Connel United Free Church (1909-29), formerly Ardchattan United Free Church (1900-09), formerly Ardchattan Free Church (1859-1900), formerly Ardchattan and Appin Free Church (1843-59)
- Ardgour, Morvern and Strontian Paris uph Church (2023-)
  - Ardgour and Kingairloch Parish Church (?-2023), previously Ardgour Parish Church (1894-?)
  - Morvern Parish Church (1930-2023)
    - Lochaline Parish Church (1929-30), formerly Morven United Free Church (1900-29), formerly Morven Free Church (1877-1900), formerly Morven Free Mission Station (1843-77)
    - Morvern Parish Church (1600-1930)
      - St Columba's Parish Church, Kilcholumkill (ancient-1600)
      - St Fintan's Parish Church, Kilintach (ancient-1600)
  - Strontian Parish Church (1859-2023), formerly Strontian Parliamentary Chapel (1827-59), formerly Strontian Mission (1729-1827)
- Assynt, Rosehall and Scourie Parish Church (2024-)
  - Assynt and Stoer Parish Church (1932-2024)
    - Assynt Parish Church (ancient-1932)
    - Assynt South and Elphin Parish Church (1929-32), formerly Assynt, Elphin and Stoer United Free Church (1921-29), formerly Assynt United Free Church (1907-21)
      - Assynt United Free Church (1900-07), formerly Assynt Free Church (1843-1900)
      - Stoer United Free Church (1900-07), formerly Stoer Free Church (1843-1900)
    - Stoer Parish Church (1878-1932), formerly Stoer Parliamentary Church (1828-78)
  - Eddrachillis Parish Church (1931-2024)
    - Eddrachillis Parish Church (1724-1931)
    - Eddrachillis United Free Church (1900-31), formerly Eddrachillis Free Church (1843-1900)
  - Rosehall Parish Church (1929-2024), formerly Rosehall United Free Church (1900-29), formerly Rosehall Free Church (1843-1900)
- Berneray and Lochmaddy Parish Church (200?-)
  - Bernera Parish Church (1933-200?)
    - Bernera Parish Church (1833-1933), formerly Bernera Parliamentary Church (1827-33)
    - Bernera United Free Church (1900-33), formerly Bernera Free Church (1885-1900)
  - Lochmaddy and Trumisgarry Parish Church (1934-200?)
    - Lochmaddy United Free Church Mission Hall (-1934)
    - Trumisgarry Mission Station (1929-34), formerly Trumisgarry Parish Church (1845-1934), formerly Trumisgarry Parliamentary Church (1828-45), formerly Trumisgarry Mission Station (1802-28), formerly St Columba's Parish Church, Sand (ancient-C16th)
- Black Isle East Parish Church (2024-)
  - Avoch Parish Church (1930-2024)
    - Avoch North Parish Church (1929-30), formerly Avoch Parish Church (ancient-1929)
    - Avoch South Parish Church (1929-30), formerly Avoch United Free Church (1900-29), formerly Avoch Free Church (1850-1900)
  - Cromarty Parish Church (1934-2024)
    - Cromarty East Parish Church (1929-34), formerly Cromarty Parish Church (1918-29)
      - Cromarty Parish Church (1560-1918), formerly St Benet's Parish Church, Cromarty (ancient-1560)
      - Cromarty Gaelic Chapel (1783-1918)
    - Cromarty Stewart Memorial or West Parish Church (1929-34), formerly Cromarty United Free Church (1900-29), formerly Cromarty Free Church (1843-1900)
  - Fortrose and Rosemarkie Parish Church (1967-2024)
    - Fortrose Parish Church (1931-67)
      - Fortrose Parish Church (1873-1931), formerly St Peter's Cathedral, Fortrose (1309-1670), formerly St Curadan's Parish Church, Fortrose (ancient-1309)
      - Fortrose United Free Church (1900-31), formerly Fortrose Free Church (1843-1900)
    - Rosemarkie Parish Church (1873-1967), formerly Fortrose and Rosemarkie Parish Church (1670-1873), formerly Rosemarkie Parish Church (C16th-1670), formerly St Peter's Parish Church, Rosemarkie, formerly St Moluag's Parish Church, Rosemarkie (ancient-C16th)
- Bracadale, Duirinish and Snizort Parish Church (2023-)
  - Bracadale and Duirinish Parish Church (1998-2023)
    - Bracadale Parish Church (1560-1998), formerly St Malrubh's Parish Church, Bracadale (ancient-C16th)
    - Duirinish Parish Church (1974-98)
      - Duirinish Parish Church (1929-74)
        - Duirinish Parish Church (C16th-1929), formerly St Mary's Parish Church, Duirinish (ancient-C16th)
        - Duirinish United Free Church (1900-29), formerly Duirinish Free Church (1850-1900)
      - Waternish Parish Church (1929-74), formerly Hallin-in-Waternish Parish Church (1833-1929), formerly Hallin Parliamentary Church (1828-33)
  - Snizort Parish Church (1979-2023)
    - Snizort North Parish Church (1929-79), formerly Snizort Parish Church (1726-1929)
      - St Columba's Parish Church, Snizort (ancient-C16th)
      - Uig Parish Church (ancient-C16th)
    - Snizort South Parish Church (1929-79), formerly Snizort United Free Church (1912-29)
      - Snizort United Free Church (1900-12), formerly Snizort Free Church (1843-1900)
      - Waternish and Arnizort United Free Church (1902-12)
- Campbeltown Parish Church (2023-)
  - Campbeltown Highland Parish Church (1945-2023), formerly Campbeltown Collegiate Parish Church (two charges; three 1835-40) (1757-1945), formerly Campbeltown Highland Charge (1700-1757), formerly Kilchiaran Highland Charge (1671-1700)
    - Kilchievan Parish Church (C16th-1671), formerly St Caomhghan's Parish Church, Kilchievan (ancient-C16th)
    - Kilchiaran Highland Charge (1655-71), formerly Kilchiaran, Kilchuslan and Kilmichael Parish Church (1617-55)
      - St Kiaran's Parish Church, Kilchiaran (ancient-1617)
      - St Constantine the Martyr's Parish Church, Kilchuslan (ancient-1617)
      - St Michael's Parish Church, Kilmichael-in-Kintyre (ancient-1617)
  - Campbeltown Lorne and Lowland Parish Church (1990-2023)
    - Campbeltown Lorne Street Parish Church (1929-90), formerly Campbeltown Lorne Street United Free Church (1900-29), formerly Campbeltown Lorne Street Free Church (1867-1900)
    - Campbeltown Lowland Parish Church (1971-90)
      - Campbeltown Longrow Parish Church (1929-71), formerly Campbeltown Longrow United Free Church (1900-29), formerly Campbeltown United Presbyterian Church (1847-1900), formerly Campbeltown Relief Church (1767-1847)
      - Campbeltown Lowland Parish Church (1945-71), formerly Campbeltown Lowland Charge (1700-1757), formerly Kilchiaran Lowland Charge (1655-1700), formerly Kilchiaran Lowland Chapel (1638-55)
- Central and East Sutherland Parish Church (2025-)
  - Clyne Parish Church (1938-2025)
    - Brora Parish Church (1929-38), formerly Clyne United Free Church (1900-29), formerly Clyne Free Church (1843-1900)
    - Clyne Parish Church (1560-1938), formerly St Aloyne's Parish Church, Clyne (ancient-1560)
  - Kildonan and Loth Helmsdale Parish Church (1948-2025)
    - Helmsdale Bunilidh Parish Church (1929-48), formerly Helmsdale United Free Church (1900-29), formerly Helmsdale Free Church (1845-1900)
    - Kildonan and Loth Parish Church (1932-48)
      - Helmsdale St John's Parish Church (1929-32), formerly Kildonan Parish Church (C16th-1929), formerly St Donan's Parish Church, Kildonan (ancient-C16th)
      - Loth Parish Church (C16th-1932), formerly St Curadan's Parish Church, Loth (ancient-C16th)
  - Lairg Parish Church (1931-2025)
    - Lairg Parish Church (C16th-1931), formerly St Malrubh's Parish Church, Lairg (ancient-C16th)
    - Lairg and Shinness Parish Church (1929-31), formerly Lairg and Shinness United Free Mission Station (1920-29), formerly Lairg United Free Mission Station (1912-20), formerly Lairg United Free Church (1900-12), formerly Lairg Free Church (1843-1900)
  - Rogart Parish Church (1948-2025)
    - Rogart St Callan's Parish Church (C16th-1948), formerly St Callan's or Colin's Parish Church, Rogart (ancient-C16th)
    - Rogart Pitfure Parish Church (1929-48), formerly Rogart United Free Church (1900-29), formerly Rogart Free Church (1845-1900)
- Coll Parish Church (1865-1972, 1986-), formerly Coll Parliamentary Chapel (c.1830-65), formerly St Finan's Parish Church, Coll (ancient-1618)
- Colonsay and Oronsay Parish Church (1929-), formerly Colonsay Parish Church (1861-1929)
- Connel Parish Church (1910-), formerly Connel Chapel (1887-1910)
- Contin Parish Church (1989-)
  - Contin Strathconon Parish Church (1960-89)
    - Carnoch Strathconon Parish Church (1928-60)
      - Carnoch Parish Church (1864-1928), formerly Carnoch or Strathconon Parliamentary Church (1830-64)
      - Strathconon United Free Church (1900-28), formerly Strathconan Free Church (1874-1900)
    - Contin Parish Church (C16th-1960)
      - St Malrubh's Parish Church, Contin (ancient-C16th)
      - St Fion's Parish Church, Strathgarve (ancient-C16th)
  - Kinlochluichart and Strathgarve Parish Church (1929-89), formerly Kinlochluichart Parish Church (1864-1929), formerly Kinlochluichart Parliamentary Church (1825-64)
- Cowal Kirk Parish Church (2021-)
  - Dunoon Old and St Cuthbert's Parish Church (1982-2021)
    - Dunoon High Parish Church (1929-82), formerly Dunoon Parish Church (1894-1929), formerly Dunoon and Kilmun Parish Church (c. 1675-1894), formerly Dunoon Parish Church (ancient-c. 1675)
    - Dunoon St Cuthbert's Parish Church (1929-82), formerly Dunoon Argyll United Free Church (1900-1929), formerly Dunoon United Presbyterian Church (1847-1900), formerly Dunoon United Secession Church (1830-47)
  - Dunoon St John's Parish Church (1929-2021), formerly Dunoon St John's United Free Church (1907-29)
    - Dunoon St John's United Free Church (1900-07), formerly Dunoon Free Church (1844-1900), formerly Dunoon and Kilmun Free Church (1843-44)
    - Dunoon Gaelic United Free Church (1900-07), formerly Dunoon Gaelic Free Church (1870-1900)
  - Innellan Parish Church (1972-2021)
    - Innellan Matheson Parish Church (1929-72), formerly Innellan Parish Church (1873-1929), formerly Innellan Chapel (1851-73)
    - Innellan West Parish Church (1929-72), formerly Innellan United Free Church (1901-29)
      - Innellan North United Free Church (1900-01), formerly Innellan Free Church (1852-1900)
      - Innellan Trinity United Free Church (1900-01), formerly Innellan United Presbyterian Church (1869-1900)
  - Inverchaolain and Toward Parish Church (1929-2021)
    - Inverchaolain Parish Church (C16th-1929), formerly St Bridget's Parish Church, Inverchaolain (ancient-C16th)
    - Toward Chapel (1855-1929)
  - Kirn and Sandbank Parish Church (2017-21)
    - Kirn Parish Church (1970-2017)
      - Kirn St Andrew's Parish Church (1929-1970), formerly Kirn Parish Church (1874-1929), formerly Kirn Chapel (1858-74)
      - Kirn St Margaret's Parish Church (1929-70), formerly Kirn United Free Church (1900-29), formerly Kirn United Presbyterian Church (1860-1900)
    - Sandbank Parish Church (1936-2017)
      - Sandbank St Andrew's Parish Church (1929-36), formerly Sandbank Parish Church (1876-1929)
      - Sandbank St John's Parish Church (1929-36), formerly Sandbank United Free Church (1900-29), formerly Sandbank Free Church (1864-1900)
- Cromdale and Advie Parish Church (1972-)
  - Advie Parish Church (1888-1972), formerly Advie Mission Station (1861-88), formerly St Bride's Parish Church, Advie (ancient-c. 1560)
  - Cromdale Parish Church (1930-72)
    - Cromdale Parish Church (1888-1930), formerly Cromdale and Advie Parish Church (1869-1888), formerly Cromdale, Inverallan and Advie Parish Church (c. 1560-1869), formerly St Luag's Parish Church, Cromdale (ancient-c. 1560)
    - Cromdale and Advie United Free Church (1900-30), formerly Cromdale and Advie Free Church (1893-1900)
- Culbokie and Munlochy Parish Church (2024-)
  - Knockbain Parish Church (1934-2024)
    - Knockbain North Parish Church (1929-34), formerly Knockbain United Free Church (1912-29)
      - Knockbain United Free Church (1900-12), formerly Knockbain Munlochy Free Church (1890-1900), formerly Knockbain Free Church (1843-90)
      - Knockbain West United Free Church (1900-12), formerly Knockbain West Free Church (1890-1900)
    - Knockbain South Parish Church (1929-34), formerly Knockbain Parish Church (1762-1929)
      - Kilmuir Wester Parish Church (C16th-1762), formerly St Mary's Parish Church, Kilmuir Wester (ancient-C16th)
      - Suddie Parish Church (C16th-1756), formerly St Duthac's Parish Church, Suddie (ancient-C16th)
  - Resolis and Urquhart Parish Church (1977-2024), formerly Resolis Parish Church (1767-1977), formerly Kirkmichael Parish Church (1662-1767)
    - Cullicudden Parish Church (C16th-1662), formerly St Martin's Church, Cullicudden (ancient-C16th)
    - Kirkmichael Parish Church (C16th-1662), formerly St Michael's Parish Church, Kirkmichael-in-Ross (ancient-C16th)
- Culloden and Ardersier Parish Church (2023-)
  - Ardersier Parish Church (1963-2023)
    - Ardersier East Parish Church (1929-63), formerly Ardersier Parish Church (ancient-1929)
    - Ardersier West Parish Church (1929-63), formerly Ardersier United Free Church (1907-29)
      - Ardersier North United Free Church (1900-07), formerly Campbelltown United Presbyterian Church (1847-1900), formerly Campbelltown United Secession Church (1843-47)
      - Ardersier South United Free Church (1900-07), formerly Ardersier Free Church (1843-1900)
  - Culloden The Barn Parish Church (1990-2023), formerly Culloden Church Extension Charge (1975-90)
  - Petty Parish Church (1934-2023)
    - Petty East Parish Church (1929-34), formerly Petty United Free Church (1900-29), formerly Petty Free Church (1843-1900)
    - Petty St Columba's Parish Church (1929-34), formerly Petty Parish Church (C16th-1929)
      - St Columba's Parish Church, Petty (ancient-C16th)
      - St Ewan's Parish Church, Brachollie (ancient-C16th)
- Dalriada Mid Argyll Parish Church (2023-)
  - Ardrishaig Parish Church (1945-2023)
    - Ardrishaig North Parish Church (1929-45), formerly Ardrishaig United Free Church (1900-29), formerly Ardrishaig Free Church (1865-1900)
    - Ardrishaig Rhu Parish Church (1929-45), formerly Ardrishaig Parish Church (1875-1929), formerly Ardrishaig Mission Church (1853-75)
  - Glassary, Kilmartin and Ford Parish Church (1997-2023), formerly Glassary and Kilmartin Parish Church (1982-97)
    - Glassary or Glassary Kilmichael Parish Church (C16th-1982), formerly St Michael's Parish Church, Glassary (ancient-C16th)
    - Kilmartin Parish Church (1929-1982)
      - Kilmartin Parish Church (C16th-1929), formerly St Martin's Parish Church, Kilmartin (ancient-C16th)
      - Kilmartin United Free Mission Station (1907-29), formerly Kilmartin United Free Church (1900-07), formerly Kilmartin Free Church (1857-1900)
  - Lochgilphead Parish Church (1942-2023)
    - Lochgilphead Parish Church (1846-1942), formerly Lochgilphead Parliamentary Church (1828-46)
    - Lochgilphead West Parish Church (1929-42), formerly Lochgilphead United Free Church (1905-29)
      - Lochgilphead United Free Church (1900-05), formerly Lochgilphead Free Church (1843-1900)
      - Lochgilphead Martyrs' United Free Church (1900-05), formerly Lochgilphead Martyrs' Free Church (1876-1900), formerly Lochgilphead Reformed Presbyterian Church (1851-76), formerly Lochgilphead Reformed Presbyterian Mission Station (1831-51)
  - North Knapdale Parish Church (1982-2023)
    - North Knapdale Inverlussa and Bellanoch Parish Church (1929-82), formerly North Knapdale Parish Church (C16th-1929), formerly St Cormac's Parish Church, North Knapdale or Cillmocharmaig (ancient-C16th)
    - North Knapdale Tayvallich Parish Church (1929-82), formerly North Knapdale United Free Church (1900-29), formerly North Knapdale Free Church (1854-1900), formerly North and South Knapdale Free Church (1845-54)
  - South Knapdale Parish Church (1734-2023)
- Dingwall Castle Street Parish Church (1929-), formerly Dingwall United Free Church (1900-29), formerly Dingwall Free Church (1844-1900)
- Dingwall St Clement's Parish Church (1929-), formerly Dingwall Parish Church (1560-1929), formerly St Clement's or St Colin's Parish Church, Dingwall (ancient-1560)
- Dornoch Firth Parish Church (2024-)
  - Creich Parish Church (1931-2024)
    - Creich Parish Church (1560-1931), formerly St Deavanach's Parish Church, Creich (ancient-1560)
    - Creich Bonar Parish Church (1929-31), formerly Creich United Free Church (1900-29), formerly Creich Free Church (1843-1900)
  - Dornoch Cathedral Parish Church (1935-2024)
    - Dornoch The Cathedral Parish Church (1929-35), formerly Dornoch Parish Church (1560-1929), formerly St Gilbert's Cathedral, Dornoch (C13th-1560), formerly St Finnbarr's Parish Church, Dornoch (ancient-C13th)
    - Dornoch West Parish Church (1929-35), formerly Dornoch United Free Church (1900-29), formerly Dornoch Free Church (1843-1900)
  - Kincardine, Croick and Edderton Parish Church (1976-2024)
    - Edderton Parish Church (1939-76)
      - Edderton East Parish Church (1929-39), formerly Edderton Parish Church (ancient-1929)
      - Edderton West Parish Church (1929-39), formerly Edderton United Free Church (1900-29), formerly Edderton Free Church (1843-1900)
    - Kincardine and Croick Parish Church (1947-76)
      - Croick Parish Church (1846-1947), formerly Croick Parliamentary Church (1826-47)
      - Kincardine East Parish Church (1929-47), formerly Kincardine Parish Church (C16th-1929), formerly St Columba's Parish Church, Kincardine (ancient-C16th)
      - Kincardine West Parish Church (1929-47), formerly Kincardine and Croick United Free Church (1910-29)
        - Croick United Free Church (1900-10), formerly Croick Free Church (1880s-1900)
        - Kincardine United Free Church (1900-10), formerly Kincardine Free Church (1843-1900)
- Durness and Kinlochbervie Parish Church (1990-)
  - Durness Parish Church (1931-90)
    - Durness Durine Parish Church (1929-31), formerly Durness or Ardurness Parish Church (ancient-1929)
    - Durness Sangamore Parish Church (1929-31), formerly Durness United Free Church (1900-29), formerly Durness Free Church (1843-1900)
  - Kinlochbervie Parish Church (1929-90)
    - Kinlochbervie Parish Church (1846-1929), formerly Kinlochbervie Mission Church (1828-46)
    - Kinlochbervie United Free Church (1900-29), formerly Kinlochbervie Free Church (1848-1900)
- East Caithness Parish Church (2025-)
  - Berriedale and Dunbeath (Ross) Parish Church (1950-)
    - Berriedale Parish Church (1846-1950), formerly Berriedale Parliamentary Church (1826-46), formerly Berriedale Mission (1795-1826)
    - Dunbeath Ross Parish Church (1929-50), formerly Berriedale United Free Church (1900-29), formerly Berriedale Free Church (1843-1900)
  - Bower Parish Church (1947-)
    - Bower Holyrood Parish Church (1929-47), formerly Bower Parish Church (-1929)
    - Bower New Parish Church (1929-47), formerly Bower United Free Church (1900-29), formerly Bower Free Church (1844-1900)
  - Latheron Parish Church (1938-2025)
    - Latheron Old Parish Church (1929-38), formerly Latheron and Dunbeath Parish Church (C16th-1929)
      - Dunbeath Parish Church (ancient-C16th)
      - Latheron Parish Church (ancient-C16th)
    - Latheron West Parish Church (1929-38), formerly Latheron United Free Church (1900-29), formerly Latheron Free Church (1843-1900)
  - Lybster and Bruan Parish Church (1961-), formerly Lybster Parish Church (1934-61)
    - Lybster St Mary's Parish Church (1929-34), formerly Lybster Parish Church (1887-1929), formerly Lybster Parliamentary Church (1839-87)
    - Lybster Central Parish Church (1929-34), formerly Lybster United Free Church (1900-29), formerly Lybster Free Church (1843-1900)
  - Watten Parish Church (1938-2025)
    - Watten North Parish Church (1929-38), formerly Watten Parish Church (C16th-1929), formerly St Magnus' Parish Church, Watten (ancient-C16th)
    - Watten South Parish Church (1929-38), formerly Watten United Free Church (1900-29), formerly Watten Free Church (1843-1900)
  - Wick Pulteneytown and Thrumster Parish Church (1990-2025)
    - Wick Central Parish Church (1950-90)
      - Wick Central Parish Church (1929-50), formerly Pulteneytown Central United Free Church (1911-29)
        - Pulteneytown Central United Free Church (1900-11), formerly Pulteneytown Free Church (1843-1900)
        - Wick Martyrs' United Free Church (1900-11), formerly Wick Martyrs' Free Church (1876-1900), formerly Wick Reformed Presbyterian Church (-1876)
      - Wick West Parish Church (1929-50), formerly Pulteneytown West United Free Church (1900-29), formerly Wick United Presbyterian Church (1847-1900), formerly Wick United Secession Church (1820-47), formerly Wick Antiburgher Church (1767-1820)
    - Wick St Andrew's and Thrumster Parish Church (1961-90)
      - Bruan Thrumster Parish Church (1934-61)
        - Bruan Parish Church (1929-34), formerly Bruan United Free Church (1900-29), formerly Bruan Free Church (1843-1900), formerly Bruan Mission
        - Thrumster Mission Chapel
      - Wick Pulteneytown St Andrew's Parish Church (1929-1961)
        - Pulteneytown Parish Church (1878-1929), formerly Pulteneytown Mission Church (1839-78)
  - Wick St Fergus Parish Church (200?-2025)
    - Wick Bridge Street Parish Church (1929-200?), formerly Wick United Free Church (1900-29), formerly Wick Free Church (1843-1900)
    - Wick Old Parish Church (1929-200?), formerly Wick Parish Church (C16th-1929), formerly St Fergus' Parish Church, Wick (ancient-C16th)
- Easter Ross Peninsula Parish Church (2024-)
  - Fearn Abbey and Nigg Chapelhill Parish Church (1978-2024)
    - Fearn Parish Church (1962-78)
      - Fearn Abbey Parish Church (1929-62), formerly Fearn Parish Church (1640-1929)
      - Fearn Central Parish Church (1929-62), formerly Fearn United Free Church (1900-29), formerly Fearn Free Church (1843-1900)
    - Nigg Parish Church (1966-78)
      - Nigg Old Parish Church (1929-66), formerly Nigg Parish Church (-1929)
      - Nigg Chapelhill Parish Church (1929-66), formerly Nigg and Chapelhill United Free Church (1922-29)
        - Nigg United Free Church (1900-22), formerly Nigg Free Church (1843-1900)
        - Nigg Chapelhill United Free Church (1900-22), formerly Nigg United Presbyterian Church (1847-1900), formerly Nigg United Secession Church (1820-47), formerly Nigg Antiburgher Church (1750s-1820)
  - Tain Parish Church (1942-2024)
    - Tain Queen Street Parish Church (1929-42), formerly Tain United Free Church (1900-29), formerly Tain Free Church (1843-1900)
    - Tain St Duthus' Parish Church (1929-42), formerly Tain Parish Church (C16th-1929)
      - Morinnis Parish Church (ancient-C16th)
      - St Duthac's Parish Church, Tain (ancient-C16th)
  - Tarbat Parish Church (1946-2024)
    - Tarbat East Parish Church (1929-46), formerly Tarbat United Free Church (1900-29), formerly Tarbat Free Church (1843-1900)
    - Tarbat West Parish Church (1929-46), formerly Tarbat Parish Church (C16th-1929), formerly St Colmog's Parish Church, Tarbat (ancient-C16th)
- Ferintosh Parish Church (1961-)
  - Ferintosh and Maryburgh Parish Church (1929-61), formerly Ferintosh and Maryburgh United Free Church (1908-29)
    - Maryburgh United Free Church (1900-08), formerly Maryburgh Free Church (1843-1900), formerly Maryburgh Parish Church (1841-43)
    - Urquhart United Free Church (1900-08), formerly Urquhart Free Church (1843-1900)
  - Urquhart Parish Church (C16th-1961)
    - Logie Wester or Logiebride Parish Church (ancient-C16th)
    - St Malrubh's Parish Church, Urquhart (ancient-C16th)
- Fodderty and Strathpeffer Parish Church (1947-)
  - Fodderty Parish Church (1600-1947)
    - Fodderty Parish Church (ancient-1600)
    - Glen Ussie Parish Church (ancient-1600)
    - Kinettas Parish Church (-1600)
  - Strathpeffer Parish Church (1929-47), formerly Strathpeffer and Fodderty United Free Church (1900-29), formerly Strathpeffer and Fodderty Free Church (1889-1900)
- Fort Augustus Parish Church (1934-)
  - Fort Augustus Abertarff Parish Church (1929-34), formerly Fort Augustus Parish Church (1883-1929), formerly Abertarff Mission (1739-1883), formerly St Cuimin's Parish Church, Abertarff or Kilchuimin (ancient-1614)
  - Fort Augustus Inveroich Parish Church (1929-34), formerly Fort Augustus United Free Church (1907-29)
    - Fort Augustus United Free Church (1900-07), formerly Fort Augustus Free Church (1878-1900), formerly Fort Augustus and Glenmoriston Free Church (1844-78)
    - Glenmoriston United Free Church (1900-07), formerly Glenmoriston Free Church (1878-1900)
- Fort William Kilmallie Parish Church (2020-)
  - Fort William Duncansburgh Macintosh Parish Church (2007-2020)
    - Fort William Duncansburgh Parish Church (1929-2007), formerly Duncansburgh Parish Church (1860-1929), formerly Inverlochy and Fort William Chapel (1692-1860)
    - Fort William Macintosh Memorial Parish Church (1929-2007), formerly Fort William United Free Church (1900-29), formerly Fort William Free Church (1843-1900)
  - Kilmallie Parish Church (1931-2020)
    - Kilmallie Parish Church (C16th-1931), formerly St Mailin's Parish Church, Kilmallie (ancient-C16th)
    - Kilmallie and Kilmonivaig United Free Church (1912-31)
      - Kilmallie United Free Church (1900-12), formerly Kilmallie Free Church (1843-1900)
      - Kilmonivaig United Free Mission Station (1909-12), formerly Kilmonivaig United Free Church (1900-09), formerly Kilmonivaig Free Church (1843-1900)
- Glengarry Parish Church (1867-), formerly Glengarry Mission (1819-67)
- Glenorchy and Strathfillan Parish Church (2023-)
  - Glenorchy and Innishael Parish Church (1931-2023)
    - Glenorchy and Inishail Parish Church (1618-1931)
      - St Conan's Parish Church, Glenorchy (ancient-1618)
      - St Findoch's Parish Church, Inishail (ancient-1618)
    - Glenorchy South Parish Church (1929-31), formerly Glenorchy United Free Mission Station (1916-20, 1924-29), formerly Glenorchy United Free Church (1900-16, 1920-24), formerly Glenorchy Free Church (1843-1900)
  - Strathfillan Parish Church (1930-2023)
    - Strathfillan Parish Church (-1930)
    - Strathfillan West Parish Church (1929-30), formerly Strathfillan and Crianlarich United Free Church (1911-29), formerly Strathfillan United Free Church (1900-11), formerly Strathfillan Free Church (1843-1900)
- Golspie Parish Church (1936-)
  - Golspie Fountain Road Parish Church (1929-36), formerly Golspie United Free Church (1900-29), formerly Golspie Free Church (1845-1900)
  - Golspie St Andrew's Parish Church (1929-36), formerly Golspie Parish Church (C16th-1929), formerly Kilmalie Parish Church, formerly St Maliew's Parish Church, Kilmaliew (ancient-C16th)
- Grantown-on-Spey and Dulnain Bridge Parish Church (2023-)
  - Dulnain Bridge Parish Church (1941-2023), formerly St Drostan's Mission Chapel (1925-41)
  - Grantown-on-Spey Parish Church (1960-2023)
    - Grantown South Parish Church (1929-1960), formerly Grantown United Free Church (1900-29), formerly Grantown Free Church (1893-1900), formerly Cromdale Free Church (1843-93)
    - Inverallan Parish Church (1869-1960), formerly Inverallan Parliamentary Church (1839-69), formerly St Futach's Parish Church, Inverallan (ancient-c. 1560)
- Invergordon Parish Church (1929-), formerly Invergordon United Free Church (1900-29), formerly Invergordon Free Church (1861-1900)
- Inverness Crown Parish Church (1929-), formerly Inverness Crown United Free Church (1900-29), formerly Inverness Crown Free Church (1896-1900)
- Inverness Hilton Parish Church (1975-), formerly Inverness Hilton Church Extension Charge (1955-75)
- Inverness Inshes East Parish Church (2023-)
  - Inverness East Parish Church (1929-2023), formerly Inverness East United Free Church (1900-29), formerly Inverness East Free Church (1843-1900), formerly Inverness East Chapel (1798-1843)
  - Inverness Inshes Parish Church (200?-2023), formerly Inverness West Parish Church (1835-200?)
- Inverness Kinmylies Parish Church (200?-), formerly Inverness Kinmylies Church Extension Charge (1992-200?)
- Inverness Ness Bank Parish Church (1929-), formerly Inverness Ness Bank United Free Church (1900-29), formerly Inverness United Presbyterian Church (1847-1900), formerly Inverness United Secession Church (1820-47), formerly Inverness Antiburgher Church (1790-1820)
- Inverness Old High St Stephen's Parish Church (2004-)
  - Inverness Old High Parish Church (1929-2004), formerly Inverness and Bona Parish Church (1618-1929) (two charges 1624-1835, three 1641-49)
    - St Mary's Parish Church, Inverness, formerly St Columba's Parish Church, Inverness (ancient-1618)
    - St Curadan's Parish Church, Bona (ancient-1618)
  - Inverness St Stephen's Parish Church (1915-2004), formerly Inverness St Stephen's Mission Church (1897-1915)
- Inverness St Columba's Parish Church (200?-)
  - Dores and Boleskine Parish Church (1973-200?)
    - Dores and Bona Parish Church (1943-73)
      - Bona Parish Church (1929-43), formerly Dores and Bona United Free Church (1900-29), formerly Dores and Bona Free Church (1843-1900)
      - Dores Parish Church (ancient-1943)
    - Stratherrick and Boleskine Parish Church (1934-73)
      - Stratherrick and Boleskine Parish Church (1929-34)
        - Boleskine Parish Church (1883-1934), formerly Boleskine and Abertarff Parish Church (1614-1883), formerly Boleskine Parish Church (ancient-1614)
        - Stratherrick Parish Church (1929-34), formerly Stratherrick United Free Church (1900-29), formerly Stratherrick or Boleskine Free Church (1843-1900)
      - Foyers Church of Scotland and United Free Mission Church (1916-34), formerly Foyers Mission Church (1895-1916)
  - Inverness St Columba's High Parish Church (1929-200?), formerly Inverness High United Free Church (1900-29), formerly Inverness High Free Church (1843-1900)
- Inverness Trinity Dalneigh Parish Church (2023-)
  - Inverness Dalneigh and Bona Parish Church (1973-2023), formerly Inverness Dalneigh Parish Church (1951-73), formerly Inverness St Mary's Gaelic Parish Church (1649-1951)
  - Inverness Trinity Parish Church (1976-2023), formerly Inverness St Mark's Queen Street and Merkinch Parish Church (1971-76)
    - Inverness Merkinch St Mark's Parish Church (1939-71), formerly Inverness St Mark's West Parish Church (1929-39), formerly Inverness West United Free Church (1900-29), formerly Inverness West Free Church (1866-1900)
    - Inverness Queen Street Parish Church (1929-71), formerly Inverness Queen Street United Free Church (1900-29), formerly Inverness Queen Street Free Church (1873-1900), formerly Inverness Gaelic United Presbyterian Church (1847-73), formerly Inverness Gaelic United Secession Church (1839-47)
- Iona and the Ross of Mull Parish Church (2023-)
  - Iona and the Ross of Mull Parish Church (1931-2023)
    - Iona or Icholumkill Parish Church (1845-1931), formerly Iona Parliamentary Chapel (1828-45), formerly St Ronan's Parish Church, Icholumkill (ancient-c. 1600)
    - Iona and Ross of Mull United Free Mission Station (1918-31), formerly Iona and Ross of Mull United Free Church (1907-18)
      - Iona United Free Church (1900-07), formerly Iona Free Church (1890-1900), formerly Iona and Ross of Mull Free Church (1843-90)
      - Ross and Brolas United Free Church (1900-07), formerly Ross and Brolas Free Church (1890-1900)
  - Kilfinichen and Kilvickeon Parish Church (1600-2023)
    - St Finichen's Parish Church, Kilfinichen (ancient-c. 1600)
    - St Ewan's Parish Church, Kilvickeon (ancient-c. 1600)
- Isle of Bute Parish Church (2024-)
  - Rothesay Trinity Parish Church (1979-2024)
    - Rothesay Trinity Parish Church (1938/42-79)
      - Rothesay Craigmore High Parish Church (1929-42), formerly Rothesay Craigmore United Free Church (1900-29), formerly Craigmore United Presbyterian Church (1882-1900)
      - Rothesay St James's Parish Church (1932-38), formerly Rothesay Chapelhill Parish Church (1929-31), formerly Rothesay Chapelhill United Free Church (1900-29), formerly Rothesay Gaelic Chapelhall Free Church (1843-1900)
      - Rothesay Trinity Parish Church (1929-38), formerly Rothesay United Free Church (1900-29), formerly Rothesay Free Church (1843-1900)
    - Rothesay West Parish Church (1929-79), formerly Rothesay West United Free Church (1900-29), formerly Rothesay West Free Church (1843-1900)
  - United Church of Bute Parish Church (200?-2024)
    - Ascog Parish Church (1929-200?), formerly Kingarth United Free Church (1900-29), formerly Kingarth Free Church (1843-1900)
    - Kingarth and Kilchattan Bay Parish Church (1931-200?)
      - Kilchattan Bay Parish Church (1929-31), formerly Kilchattan Bay United Free Church (1900-29), formerly Kilchattan Bay Free Church (1899-1900), formerly Kingarth South Free Church (1863-99)
      - Kingarth Parish Church (ancient-1931)
    - North Bute Parish Church (1976-200?), formerly North Bute St Colmac's, St Bruoc's and St Ninian's Parish Church (1956-76)
      - North Bute St Colmac's and St Ninian's Parish Church (1929-1956), formerly North Bute Parish Church (1844-1929), formerly North Bute Chapel (1836-44)
      - Port Bannatyne St Bruoc's Parish Church (1929-56), formerly North Bute United Free Church (1900-29), formerly North Bute Free Church (1843-1900)
    - Rothesay Craigmore St Brendan's Parish Church (1929-200?), formerly Craigmore Parish Church (1902-29), formerly Craigmore Chapel of Ease (1889-1902)
    - Rothesay High Parish Church (1973-200?)
      - Rothesay High Kirk Parish Church (1929-73)
        - Rothesay Parish Church (C16th-1929), formerly St Mary's Parish Church, Rothesay (C13th-C16th), formerly St Brioch's Parish Church, Rothesay (ancient-C13th)
        - Rothesay Gaelic Chapel (1836-43, 1859-1929)
      - Rothesay St John's Parish Church (1942-73)
        - Rothesay Bridgend Parish Church (1929-42), formerly Rothesay Bridgend United Free Church (1900-29), formerly Rothesay United Presbyterian Church (1847-1900), formerly Rothesay United Secession Church (1820-47), formerly Rothesay Antiburgher Church (1764-1820)
        - Rothesay New Parish Church (1871-1942), formerly Rothesay Chapel of Ease (1798-1871)
- Jura Parish Church (1641-), formerly Jura and Gigha Parish Church (C16th-1641), formerly St Kiaran's Parish Church, Kilearnadail (ancient-C16th)
- Kilchrenan and Dalavich Parish Church (1939-)
  - Kilchrenan and Dalavich Parish Church (C16th-1939)
    - St Peter the Deacon's Parish Church, Kilchrenan, formerly St Chreathanan's Parish Church, Kilchrenan (ancient-C16th)
    - Dalavich Parish Church (ancient-C16th)
  - Kilchrenan West and Portsonachan Parish Church (1929-39), formerly Kilchrenan and Portsonachan United Free Mission Station (1900-29), formerly Kilchrenan and Portsonachan Free Mission Station (1898-1900), formerly Kilchrenan Free Mission Station (1852-98), formerly Kilchrenan Free Church (1843-52)
- Killearnan Parish Church (1933-)
  - Killearnan Parish Church (C16th-1933), formerly St Iurnan's Parish Church, Killearnan (ancient-C16th)
  - Redcastle Parish Church (1929-33), formerly Killearnan United Free Church (1900-29), formerly Killearnan Free Church (1843-1900)
- Kilmonivaig Parish Church (1720-), formerly St Naomhan's Parish Church, Kilmonivaig (ancient-C16th)
- Kilmorack and Erchless Parish Church (1979-)
  - Erchless Parish Church (1930-79)
    - Erchless Parish Church (1884-1930)
    - Strathglass United Free Church (1900-30), formerly Strathglass Free Church (1878-1900), formerly Strathglass Free Mission Church (1853-78)
  - Kilmorack Parish Church (1932-79)
    - Kilmorack East Parish Church (1929-32), formerly Kilmorack United Free Church (1900-29), formerly Kilmorack Free Church (1843-1900)
    - Kilmorack West Parish Church (1929-32), formerly Kilmorack Parish Church (C16th-1929), formerly St Moroc's Parish Church, Kilmorack (ancient-C16th)
- Kilmore and Oban Parish Church (1983-)
  - Kilmore and Kilbride Oban Old Parish Church (1966-83)
    - Kilmore and Kilbride Parish Church (C16th-1966)
      - Kilmore Parish Church (ancient-C16th)
      - St Bride's Parish Church, Kilbride (ancient-C16th)
    - Oban Old Parish Church (1929-66), formerly Oban Parish Church (1867-1929), formerly Oban Mission Church (1821-67)
  - Oban Christ's Church Dunollie Parish Church (1962-83), formerly Oban Dunollie Road Parish Church (1929-62), formerly Oban Dunollie Road United Free Church (1900-29), formerly Oban United Presbyterian Church (1847-1900), formerly Oban United Secession Church (1835-47)
  - Oban St Columba's Argyll Square Parish Church (1949-83)
    - Oban Argyll Square Parish Church (1929-49), formerly Oban Argyll Square United Free Church (1900-29), formerly Oban Argyll Square Free Church (1885-1900)
    - Oban St Columba's Parish Church (1880-1949), formerly Oban St Columba's Mission Church (1875-80)
- Kilmuir and Logie Easter Parish Church (1976-)
  - Kilmuir Easter Parish Church (1940-76)
    - Kilmuir Easter East Parish Church (1929-40), formerly Kilmuir Easter Parish Church (C16th-1929), formerly St Mary's Parish Church, Kilmuir Easter (ancient-C16th)
    - Kilmuir Easter West Parish Church (1929-40), formerly Kilmuir Easter United Free Church (1900-29), formerly Kilmuir Easter Free Church (1843-1900)
  - Logie Easter Parish Church (1934-76)
    - Logie Easter North Parish Church (1929-34), formerly Logie Easter Parish Church (ancient-1929)
    - Logie Easter South Parish Church (1929-34), formerly Logie Easter United Free Church (1900-29), formerly Logie Easter Free Church (1843-1900)
- Kilmuir and Paible Parish Church (1934-)
  - Kilmuir Parish Church (-1934), formerly North Uist (Kilmorie and Sand) Parish Church (C16th-c. 1800), formerly St Mary's Parish Church, Kilmorie (ancient-C16th)
  - Paible Parish Church (1929-34), formerly North Uist United Free Church (1900-29), formerly North Uist Free Church (1843-1900)
- Kilmuir and Stenscholl Parish Church (1981-)
  - Kilmuir Parish Church (1929-81)
    - Kilmuir Parish Church (1600-1929), formerly Kilmaluaig Parish Church (C16th-1600)
      - St Moluag's Parish Church, Kilmaluaig (ancient-C16th)
      - St Martin's Parish Church, Kilmartin (ancient-C16th)
    - Kilmuir United Free Church (1900-29), formerly Kilmuir and Staffin Free Church (1840s-1900)
  - Stenscholl Parish Church (1833-1981)
- Kiltarlity and Kirkhill Parish Church (2021-)
  - Kiltarlity Parish Church (1938-2021)
    - Kiltarlity East Parish Church (1929-38), formerly Kiltarlity Parish Church (1600-1929)
      - St Talorgan's Parish Church, Kiltarlity (ancient-1600)
      - St Laurence's Parish Church, Glen Convinth or Convinth (ancient-1600)
    - Kiltarlity West Parish Church (1929-38), formerly Kiltarlity United Free Church (1900-29), formerly Kiltarlity Free Church (1843-1900)
  - Kirkhill Parish Church (1934-2021)
    - Kirkhill Wardlaw Parish Church (1929-34), formerly Kirkhill Parish Church (1618-1929)
      - St Muireach's Parish Church, Wardlaw (C13th-C16th), formerly St Mary's Parish Church, Dunballoch (ancient-C13th)
      - St Curadan's Parish Church, Farnua (ancient-C16th)
    - Kirkhill St Mary's Parish Church (1929-34), formerly Kirkhill United Free Church (1900-29), formerly Kirkhill Free Church (1843-1900)
- Kiltearn Parish Church (1618-)
  - Kiltearn Parish Church (C16th-1618), formerly Our Lord's Parish Church, Kiltearn (ancient-C16th)
  - Lemlair Parish Church (C16th-1618), formerly St Brig's Parish Church, Lemlair (ancient-C16th)
- Kingussie Parish Church (1957-)
  - Kingussie St Andrew's Parish Church (1929-1957), formerly Kingussie United Free Church (1900-29), formerly Kingussie and Newtonmore Free Church (1843-1900)
  - Kingussie St Columba's Parish Church (1929-1957), formerly Kingussie Parish Church (1869-1929), formerly Kingussie and Insh Parish Church (1580-1869), formerly St Columba's Parish Church, Kingussie (ancient-1580)
- Laggan and Newtonmore Parish Church (2019-)
  - Laggan Parish Church (1931-2019)
    - St Kenneth's Parish Church, Laggan (ancient-1572, 1636-72, 1708-1931)
    - Laggan South Parish Church (1929-31), formerly Laggan United Free Church (1900-29), formerly Laggan Free Church (1843-1900)
  - Newtonmore Parish Church (1933-2019), formerly St Andrew's and St Columba's Mission Stations
- Lochbroom and Ullapool Parish Church (1956-)
  - Lochbroom Parish Church (C16th-1956), formerly St Donan's Parish Church, Lochbroom (ancient-C16th)
  - Ullapool Parish Church (1929-56)
    - Ullapool Parish Church (1833-1929), formerly Ullapool Parliamentary Church (1828-33)
    - Lochbroom United Free Church (1900-29), formerly Lochbroom Free Church (1843-1900)
- Lochgoilhead and Kilmorich Parish Church (1952-)
  - Lochgoilhead Gibson Parish Church (1929-52), formerly Lochgoilhead United Free Church (1900-29), formerly Lochgoilhead Free Church (1883-1900)
  - Lochgoilhead The Three Brethren Parish Church (1929-52), formerly Lochgoilhead Parish Church (C16th-1929)
    - Lochgoilhead Parish Church (ancient-C16th)
    - St Muireach's Parish Church, Kilmorich (ancient-C16th)
- Manish Scarista Parish Church (1931-)
  - Manish Parish Church (1929-31), formerly Harris United Free Church (1900-29), formerly Harris Free Church (1849-1900)
  - Scarista Parish Church (1929-31), formerly Harris Parish Church (C16th-1929), formerly St Bride's Parish Church, Harris (ancient-C16th)
    - St Kilda or Hirt Parish Church (status doubtful)
- Mid Kintyre and Gigha Parish Church (2023-)
  - Gigha and Cara Parish Church (1726-2023), formerly St Catan's Parish Church, Gigha (ancient-C16th)
  - Kilcalmonell Parish Church (1965-2023), formerly Kilcalmonell and Kilberry Parish Church (C16th-1965), formerly St Colman's Parish Church, Kilcalmonell (ancient-C16th)
  - Killean and Kilchenzie Parish Church (1944-2023)
    - Killean and Kilchenzie Parish Church (1636-59, 1726-1944), formerly Killean, Kilchenzie and Gigha Parish Church (1659-1726)
      - Killean Parish Church (C16th-1636), formerly St John the Evangelist's Parish Church, Killean (ancient-C16th)
      - Kilchenzie and Kilmalrubh Parish Church (C16th-1636)
        - St Kenneth's Parish Church, Kilchenzie (ancient-C16th)
        - St Malrubh's Parish Church, Kilmalrubh (ancient-C16th)
    - Largieside Parish Church (1929-44), formerly Killean and Kilcalmonell United Free Church (1917-29)
      - Kilcalmonell, Kilberry and South Knapdale United Free Church (1907-17)
        - Kilcalmonell United Free Church (1900-07), formerly Kilcalmonell Free Church (1870-1900)
        - Kilberry and South Knapdale United Free Church (1900-07), formerly Kilberry and South Knapdale Free Church (1854-1900)
      - Killean United Free Church (1900-17), formerly Killean Free Church (1843-1900)
  - Skipness Parish Church (1870-2023)
- Muckairn Parish Church (1930-)
  - Muckairn Parish Church (ancient-1618, 1846-1930)
  - Muckairn West Parish Church (1929-30), formerly Muckairn United Free Church (1900-29), formerly Muckairn or Taynuilt Free Church (1843-1900)
- Nairnshire Parish Church (2026-)
  - Nairn Old Parish Church (1929-), formerly Nairn Parish Church (C16th-1929), formerly St Ninian's Parish Church, Invernairn (ancient-C16th)
  - Nairn St Ninian's and Auldearn and Dalmore Parish Church (2021-)
    - Ardclach Parish Church (1933-2021)
      - Ardclach North Parish Church (1929-33), formerly Ardclach United Free Church (1900-29), formerly Ardclach Free Church (1844-1900)
      - Ardclach South Parish Church (1929-33), formerly Ardclach Parish Church (C16th-1929), formerly St Luag's Parish Church, Ardclach (ancient-C16th)
    - Auldearn and Dalmore Parish Church (1930-2021)
      - Auldearn Parish Church (C16th-1930), formerly St Columba's Parish Church, Auldearn (ancient-C16th)
      - Dalmore Parish Church (1929-1930), formerly Auldearn United Free Church (1900-29), formerly Auldearn Free Church (1843-1900)
    - Nairn St Ninian's Parish Church (1974-2021)
      - Nairn High Parish Church (1929-74), formerly Nairn High United Free Church (1900-29), formerly Nairn Free Church (1843-1900)
      - Nairn Rosebank Parish Church (1929-74), formerly Nairn Rosebank United Free Church (1900-29), formerly Nairn United Presbyterian Church (1847-1900), formerly Nairn United Secession Church (1820-47), formerly Nairn Antiburgher Church (1776-1820)
- Netherlorn Parish Church (2023-)
  - Craignish Parish Church (C16th-2023), formerly St Malrubh's Parish Church, Craignish (ancient-C16th)
  - Kilbrandon and Kilchattan Parish Church (1932-2023)
    - Kilbrandon and Kilchattan North Parish Church (1929-32), formerly Kilbrandon United Free Church (1900-29), formerly Kilbrandon and Kilchattan Free Church (1843-1900)
    - Kilbrandon and Kilchattan South Parish Church (1929-32), formerly Kilbrandon and Kilchattan Parish Church (C16th-1929)
      - St Breandan's Parish Church, Kilbrandon (ancient-C16th)
      - St Catan's Parish Church, Kilchattan (ancient-C16th)
  - Kilninver and Kilmelford Parish Church (1929-2023)
    - Kilninver and Kilmelford Parish Church (C16th-1929)
      - Kilninver Parish Church (ancient-C16th)
      - Kilmelford Parish Church (ancient-C16th)
    - Kilninver and Kilmelford United Free Mission Station (1902-29), formerly Kilninver and Kilmelford United Free Church (1900-02), formerly Kilninver and Kilmelford Free Church (1843-1900)
- North and West Islay Parish Church (2018-)
  - Kilchoman Parish Church (1769-2018), formerly St Comman's Parish Church, Kilchoman (ancient-1618)
  - Kilmeny Parish Church (1849-2018), formerly Kilmeny Parliamentary Church (1828-49), formerly Kilmeny Parish Church (ancient-C16th)
  - Portnahaven Parish Church (1929-2018)
    - Portnahaven Parish Church (1849-1929), formerly Portnahaven Parliamentary Church (1830-49)
    - Kilchoman and Portnahaven United Free Church (1913-29)
      - Kilchoman United Free Church (1900-13), formerly Kilchoman Free Church (1843-1900)
      - Portnahaven United Free Church (1900-13), formerly Portnahaven Free Church (1875-1900), formerly Portnahaven Free Mission Station (1843-75)
- North Coast and the Flows Parish Church (2025-)
  - Altnaharra and Farr Parish Church (1982-2025)
    - Altnaharra Parish Church (1929-82), formerly Altnaharra United Free Church (1900-29), formerly Altnaharra Free Church (1870-1900)
    - Farr Parish Church (1955-82)
      - Farr High Parish Church (1929-55), formerly Farr United Free Church (1900-29), formerly Farr Free Church (1843-1900)
      - Farr St Columba's Parish Church (1929-55), formerly Farr Parish Church (ancient-1929)
  - Halkirk and Westerdale Parish Church (1986-2025)
    - Halkirk Parish Church (1933-86)
      - Halkirk Abbey Parish Church (1929-33), formerly Halkirk Parish Church (C16th-1929)
        - St Fergus' Parish Church, Halkirk (ancient-C16th)
        - St Thomas' Parish Church, Skinnet (ancient-C16th)
        - St Magnus' Parish Church, Spittal (ancient-C16th)
      - Halkirk West Parish Church (1929-33), formerly Halkirk United Free Church (1900-29), formerly Halkirk Free Church (1843-1900)
    - Westerdale and Halsary Parish Church (1929-86), formerly Westerdale and Halsary United Free Church (1900-29), formerly Westerdale and Halsary Free Church (1843-1900)
  - Melness and Tongue Parish Church (1998-2025)
    - Melness and Eribol Parish Church (1929-98), formerly Melness and Eriboll United Free Church (1900-29), formerly Melness and Eriboll Free Church (1850s-1900)
    - Tongue Parish Church (1937-98)
      - Tongue St Andrew's Parish Church (1929-37), formerly Tongue Parish Church (1726-1929)
      - Tongue Strathtongue Parish Church (1929-37), formerly Tongue United Free Church (1900-29), formerly Tongue Free Church (1843-1900)
  - North Coast Parish Church (2006-2025)
    - Reay Parish Church (1955-2006)
      - Reay Parish Church (C16th-1955), formerly St Colman's Parish Church, Reay (ancient-C16th)
      - Shebster Shurrery Parish Church (1933-55)
        - Shurrery Parish Church (1902-33), formerly Shurrery Mission Church (1838/1880-1902)
        - Shebster Parish Church (1929-33), formerly Reay United Free Church (1900-29), formerly Reay Free Church (1843-1900)
    - Strathy and Halladale Parish Church (1931-2006)
      - Strathy East Parish Church (1929-31), formerly Strathy United Free Church (1900-29), formerly Strathy and Halladale Free Church (1847-1900)
      - Strathy West Parish Church (1929-31), formerly Strathy Parish Church (1846-1929), formerly Strathy Mission Church (1828-46)
  - Thurso West Parish Church (1929-2025), formerly Thurso West United Free Church (1900-29), formerly Thurso West Free Church (1852-1900), formerly Thurso Original Secession Church (-1852)
- North Mull Parish Church (2020-)
  - Kilninian and Kilmore Parish Church (1931-2020)
    - Kilninian and Kilmore Parish Church (1845-1931), formerly Kilninian, Kilmore and Ulva Parish Church (1628-1845)
      - St Ninian's Parish Church, Kilninian (ancient-1628)
      - St Columba's Parish Church, Kilmore or Kilcholumkill (ancient-1628)
    - Kilninian and Kilmore United Free Church (1900-31), formerly Kilninian and Kilmore Free Church (1843-1900)
  - Salen and Ulva Parish Church (1930-2020)
    - Salen and Ulva Parish Church (1929-30)
      - Salen Parish Church (1845-1929), formerly Salen Parliamentary Chapel (1828-45)
      - Ulva Parish Church (1845-1929), formerly Ulva Parliamentary Chapel (1828-45), formerly St Ewan's Parish Church, Ulva (ancient-1628)
    - Torosay and Salen United Free Church (1900-29), formerly Torosay and Salen Free Church (1840s-1900)
  - Tobermory Parish Church (1944-2020)
    - Tobermory High Parish Church (1929-44), formerly Tobermory Parish Church (1845-1929), formerly Tobermory Parliamentary Chapel (1828-45)
    - Tobermory St Mary's Parish Church (1929-44), formerly Tobermory United Free Church (1900-29), formerly Tobermory Free Church (1843-1900)
  - Torosay and Kinlochspelvie Parish Church (1952-2020)
    - Kinlochspelvie Parish Church (1845-1952), formerly Kinlochspelvie Parliamentary Chapel (1828-45)
    - Torosay Parish Church (C16th-1952), formerly St John's Parish Church, Killean (ancient-C16th)
- North West Lochaber Parish Church (200?-)
  - Arisaig and the Small Isles Parish Church (1991-200?), formerly Arisaig or Arisaig and Moidart Parish Church (1919-1991), formerly St Malrubh's Parish Church, Arisaig or Kilmolroy in Arisaig (ancient-1614)
  - Mallaig St Columba and Knoydart Parish Church (1991-200?), formerly Mallaig and the Small Isles Parish Church (1972-91)
    - Knoydart Parish Church (1863-1972), formerly St Coan's or Comgan's Parish Church, Knoydart (ancient-C16th)
    - Mallaig Parish Church (1931-1972)
      - St Columba's Mission Church, Mallaig (1909-1931)
      - Arisaig and the Small Isles United Free Church (1913-31), formerly Arisaig United Free Church (1900-13), formerly Arisaig Free Church (1844-1900)
    - Small Isles Parish Church (C16th-1972)
      - St Columba's Parish Church, Canna (C16th-1560)
      - St Donan's Parish Church, Eigg (C16th-1560)
- Pentland Parish Church (200?-)
  - Canisbay Parish Church (1950-200?),
    - Canisbay Old Parish Church (1929-50), formerly Canisbay Parish Church (C16th-1929), formerly St Anne's Parish Church, Canisbay (ancient-C16th)
    - Canisbay South Parish Church (1929-50), formerly Canisbay United Free Church (1900-29), formerly Canisbay Free Church (1843-1900)
  - Dunnet Parish Church (1937-200?)
    - Dunnet Parish Church (C16th-1937), formerly St Faelchu's Parish Church, Dunnet (ancient-C16th)
    - Barrock Parish Church (1929-37), formerly Dunnet United Free Church (1900-29), formerly Dunnet Free Church (1843-1900)
  - Keiss Parish Church (1942-200?)
    - Keiss Macleay Parish Church (1929-42), formerly Keiss Parish Church (1846-1929), formerly Keiss Parliamentary Church (1827-46)
    - Keiss West Parish Church (1929-42), formerly Keiss United Free Church (1900-29), formerly Keiss Free Church (1860-1900)
  - Olrig Parish Church (1938-200?)
    - Olrig East Parish Church (1929-38), formerly Olrig Parish Church (C16th-1929), formerly St Trothan's Parish Church, Olrig (ancient-C16th)
    - Olrig West Parish Church (1929-38), formerly Olrig United Free Church (1900-29), formerly Olrig Free Church (1843-1900)
- Portree Parish Church (1934-)
  - Portree North Parish Church (1929-34), formerly Portree United Free Church (1911-29)
    - Portree United Free Church (1900-11), formerly Portree Free Church (1840s-1900)
    - Portree Adam Memorial United Free Church (1900-11), formerly Portree United Presbyterian Church (1862-1900), formerly Portree United Presbyterian Mission Station (1847-62), formerly Portree United Secession Mission Station (1842-47)
  - Portree South Parish Church (1929-34), formerly Portree Parish Church (1726-1929), formerly Kiltarlagain, Raasay, Snizort and Uig Parish Church (C16th-1726)
    - St Tarlagan's Parish Church, Kiltarlagain (ancient-C16th)
    - St Moluag's Parish Church, Raasay (ancient-C16th)
- Rothiemurchus and Aviemore Parish Church (1970s-), formerly Rothiemurchus Parish Church (1931-1970s)
  - Rothiemurchus St Andrew's Aviemore Parish Church (1929-1931), formerly Rothiemurchus Parish Church (1833-1929), formerly Rothiemurchus Parliamentary Church (1830-33), formerly St Tuchaldus' Parish Church, Rothiemurchus (ancient-1625)
  - Rothiemurchus St Columba's Aviemore Parish Church (1929-31), formerly Rothiemurchus and Aviemore United Free Church (1902-29)
- Saddell and Carradale Parish Church (1952-)
  - Carradale and Skipness Parish Church (1929-52), formerly Carradale and Skipness United Free Church (1900-29), formerly Carradale and Skipness Free Church (1890-1900)
  - Saddell Parish Church (1870-1952), formerly Saddell and Skipness Parish Church (1753-1870), formerly Saddell and Gigha Parish Church (1641-59)
- South Islay Parish Church (2019-)
  - Kilarrow Parish Church (1931-2019)
    - Kilarrow Parish Church (1828-1931), formerly Kilarrow and Kilmeny Parish Church (C16th-1618, 1769-1828), formerly Kilarrow, Kilmeny and Kilchoman Parish Church (1618-1769), formerly St Malrubh's Parish Church, Kilarrow (ancient-C16th)
    - Bowmore Parish Church (1929-31), formerly Bowmore United Free Church (1900-29), formerly Bowmore Free Church (1859-1900)
  - Kildalton and Oa Parish Church (1973-2019), formerly Kildalton Parish Church (1932-73)
    - Kildalton Parish Church (1929-32)
      - Kildalton Parish Church (1830-1929), formerly Kildalton and Oa Parish Church (C16th-1830), formerly St John the Evangelist's Parish Church, Kildalton (ancient-C16th)
      - Oa Parish Church (1849-1929), formerly Oa Parliamentary Church (1830-49), formerly St Neachtan's Parish Church, Kilnachtan (ancient-C16th)
    - Port Ellen St Columba's Parish Church (1929-32), formerly Kildalton and Oa United Free Church (1900-29), formerly Kildalton and Oa Free Church (1843-1900)
- South Lochaber Parish Church (2023-)
  - Duror Parish Church (1846-2023), formerly Duror Parliamentary Church (1828-46)
  - Glencoe St Munda's Parish Church (1934-2023)
    - Ballachulish South Parish Church (1929-34), formerly Ballachulish South United Free Church (1900-29), formerly Ballachulish South Free Church (1877-1900) [most of congregation joined UFCC 1934]
    - Glencoe St Munda's Parish Church (1929-1934), formerly Glencoe Parish Church (1890-1929), formerly Glencoe Mission Church (c. 1800-90), formerly St Fintan Munu's Parish Church, Eilean Munda (ancient-C16th)
  - Kinlochleven Parish Church (1932-2023), formerly Kinlochleven Mission Station (-1932)
  - Nether Lochaber Parish Church (1953-2023), formerly Ballachulish Parish Church (1933-53)
    - Ballachulish Parish Church (1845-1933), formerly Ballachulish Parliamentary Chapel (1828-45)
    - Ballachulish North Parish Church (1929-33), formerly Ballachulish North United Free Church (1914-29)
      - Ballachulish North United Free Church (1900-14), formerly Ballachulish North Free Church (1877-1900), formerly Ballachulish Free Church (1843-77)
      - Kinlochleven United Free Church (1910-14), formerly Kinlochleven United Free Mission Station (1908-10)
- South West Ross Parish Church (2024-)
  - Applecross, Lochcarron and Torridon Parish Church (1998-2024)
    - Applecross Parish Church (1929-1998)
      - Applecross United Free Church (1900-29), formerly Applecross Free Church (1840s-1900)
      - Applecross Parish Church (C16th-1929), formerly St Malrubh's Parish Church, Applecross (ancient-C16th)
    - Lochcarron and Shieldaig Parish Church (1972-98)
      - Lochcarron Parish Church (1932-72)
        - Lochcarron East Parish Church (1929-32), formerly Lochcarron Parish Church (C16th-1932), formerly St Maelrubh's Parish Church, Lochcarron (ancient-C16th)
        - Lochcarron West Parish Church (1929-32), formerly Lochcarron United Free Church (1900-29), formerly Lochcarron Free Church (1843-1900)
      - Shieldaig Parish Church (1833-1972)
    - Torridon and Kinlochewe Parish Church (1929-1998), formerly Shieldaig, Torridon and Kinlochewe United Free Church (1916-29)
      - Shieldaig and Torridon United Free Church (1900-16), formerly Shieldaig and Torridon Free Church (1840s-1900)
      - Kinlochewe United Free Church (1900-09), formerly Kinlochewe Free Church (1875-1900)
  - Glenelg, Kintail and Lochalsh Parish Church (200?-24)
    - Glenelg and Kintail Parish Church (1987-200?)
      - Glenelg Parish Church (1931-1987)
        - Glenelg East Parish Church (1929-31), formerly Glenelg United Free Church (1900-29), formerly Glenelg Free Church (1850s-1900)
        - Glenelg West Parish Church (1929-31), formerly Glenelg Parish Church (1863-1929), formerly Glenelg and Knoydart Parish Church (C16th-1863), formerly St Cuimen's Parish Church, Glenelg (ancient-C16th)
      - Glenshiel Parish Church (1826-1987)
      - Kintail Parish Church (C16th-1987), formerly St Duthac's Parish Church, Kintail (ancient-C16th)
    - Lochalsh Parish Church (1990-200?)
      - Lochalsh and Stromeferry Parish Church (1946-90)
        - Lochalsh Parish Church (C16th-1946), formerly St Coan's Parish Church, Lochalsh (ancient-C16th)
        - Strome Ferry (-1946)
      - Plockton and Kyle Parish Church (1946-1990)
        - Plockton Old Parish Church (1929-46), formerly Plockton Parish Church (1897-1929), formerly Plockton Parliamentary Church (1828-97)
        - Plockton West and Kyle Parish Church (1929-46), formerly Plockton and Kyle United Free Church (1900-29), formerly Plockton Free Church (1843-1900)
- Southend Parish Church (1946-)
  - Southend St Blaan's Parish Church (1929-46), formerly Southend Parish Church (1671-1929), formerly Kilcholumkill, Kilblaan and Kilchievan Parish Church (1617-71)
    - St Columba's Parish Church, Kilcholumkill (ancient-C16th)
    - St Blaan's Parish Church, Kilblaan (ancient-C16th)
  - Southend St Columba's Parish Church (1929-46), formerly Southend United Free Church (1900-29), formerly Southend United Presbyterian Church (1847-1900), formerly Southend Relief Church (1797-1847)
- Strachur and Strathlachlan Parish Church (1937-)
  - Strachur and Strathlachlan East Parish Church (1929-37), formerly Strachur and Strathlachlan Parish Church (1650-1929)
    - Strachur Parish Church (C16th-1650), formerly St Glastian's Parish Church, Strachur (ancient-C16th)
    - Strathlachlan Parish Church (C16th-1650), formerly St Malrubh's Parish Church, Strathlachlan (ancient-C16th)
  - Strachur and Strathlachlan West Parish Church (1929-37), formerly Strachur and Strathlachlan United Free Church (1900-29), formerly Strachur and Strathlachlan Free Church (1843-1900)
- Strath and Sleat Parish Church (1983-)
  - Sleat Parish Church (1929-83)
    - Sleat Parish Church (C16th-1662, 1726-1929), formerly St Mary's Parish Church, Sleat (ancient-C16th)
    - Sleat United Free Mission Station (1907-29), formerly Sleat United Free Church (1900-07), formerly Sleat Free Church (1840s-1900)
  - Strath Parish Church (1929-83)
    - Strath Parish Church (1726-1929), formerly Strath and Sleat Parish Church (1662-1726), formerly Strath Parish Church (C16th-1662), formerly Christ's Church, Strath (ancient-C16th)
    - Strath United Free Church (1900-29), formerly Strath Free Church (1850s-1900)
- Strathnairn and Strathdearn Parish Church (2023-)
  - Cawdor Parish Church (1945-2023)
    - Cawdor North Parish Church (1929-45), formerly Cawdor United Free Church (1900-29), formerly Cawdor Free Church (1843-1900)
    - Cawdor Old Parish Church (1929-45), formerly Cawdor Parish Church (C16th-1929), formerly St Ewan's Parish Church, Cawdor or Baraven (ancient-C16th)
  - Croy and Dalcross Parish Church (1934-2023)
    - Croy North Parish Church (1929-1934), formerly Croy Parish Church (1618-1929)
      - St Duthac's Parish Church, Croy (ancient-1618)
      - Dalcross Parish Church (ancient-1618)
    - Croy West Parish Church (1929-34), formerly Croy United Free Church (1900-29), formerly Croy Free Church (1850s-1900)
  - Daviot and Dunlichity Parish Church (1618-2023)
    - Daviot Parish Church (ancient-1618)
    - St Finan's Parish Church, Dunlichity (ancient-1618)
  - Moy, Dalarossie and Tomatin Parish Church (1929-2023)
    - Moy and Dalarossie Parish Church (C16th-1929)
      - Moy Parish Church (ancient-C16th)
      - St Fergus' Parish Church, Dalarossie (ancient-C16th)
    - Moy and Daviot United Free Mission Station (1912-29)
      - Daviot United Free Mission Station (1907-12), formerly Daviot United Free Church (1900-07), formerly Daviot Free Church (1844-1900)
      - Moy United Free Mission Station (1907-12), formerly Moy United Free Church (1900-07), formerly Moy Free Church (1843-1900)
- Tarbert (Harris) Parish Church (1929-), formerly Tarbert Harris United Free Church (1900-29), formerly Tarbert Harris Free Church (1849-1900)
- Tarbert (Loch Fyne) and Kilberry Parish Church (200?-)
  - Kilberry Parish Church (1965-200?), formerly St Mary's Parish Church, Kilberry, formerly St Bearach's Parish Church, Kilberry (ancient-C16th)
  - Tarbert Parish Church (1943-200?)
    - Tarbert East Parish Church (1929-43), formerly Tarbert United Free Church (1900-29), formerly Tarbert Free Church (1843-1900)
    - Tarbert West Parish Church (1929-43), formerly Tarbert Parish Church (1864-1929), formerly Tarbert Mission Station (1819-64)
- The Shore Kirk Parish Church (200?-)
  - Kilmun St Munn's Parish Church (1929-200?), formerly Kilmun Parish Church (1894-1929), formerly St Fintan's Parish Church, Kilmun (ancient-c. 1675)
  - Strone and Ardentinny Parish Church (1937-200?)
    - Kilmun St Andrew's Parish Church (1929-37), formerly Kilmun United Free Church (1900-29), formerly Kilmun Free Church (1844-1900)
    - Strone and Ardentinny Parish Church (1932-37)
      - Ardentinny Parish Church (1874-1932), formerly Ardentinny Parliamentary Church (1838-74)
      - Strone St Columba's Parish Church (1929-1932), formerly Strone Parish Church (1884-1929), formerly Strone Chapel (1859-84)
- Thurso St Peter's and St Andrew's Parish Church (1946-)
  - Thurso St Peter's Parish Church (1929-46), formerly Thurso Parish Church (C16th-1929), formerly St Peter's Parish Church, Thurso (ancient-C16th)
  - Thurso St Andrew's Parish Church (1929-46), formerly Thurso First United Free Church (1900-29), formerly Thurso First Free Church (1852-1900), formerly Thurso Free Church (1843-52)
- Tiree Parish Church (1986-), formerly Tiree and Coll Parish Church (1972-86), formerly Tiree and Hylipol Parish Church (1952-72)
  - Hylipol Parish Church (1929-52)
    - Heylipol or Sorobie Parish Church (1875-1929), formerly Sorobie Parish Church (ancient-1618)
    - Tiree United Free Church (1907-29)
      - Coll United Free Church (1900-07), formerly Coll Free Church (1862-1900), formerly Coll and Tiree Free Church (1853-62), formerly Coll Free Church (1843-53)
      - Tiree United Free Church (1900-07), formerly Tiree Free Church (1862-1900)
  - Tiree Parish Church (1929-52), formerly Kirkapol Parish Church (1875-1929), formerly Tiree Parish Church (1865-75), formerly Tiree and Coll Parish Church (1618-1865), formerly Kirkapol Parish Church (ancient-1618)
- Tomintoul, Glenlivet and Inveravon Parish Church (200?-)
  - Inveraven and Glenlivet Parish Church (1953-200?)
    - Glenlivet and Craggan Parish Church (1932-1953)
      - Glenlivet Parish Church (1865-1932), formerly Glenlivet Mission Chapel (1712-1865)
      - Craggan Parish Church (1929-1932), formerly Inveravon United Free Church (1900-29), formerly Inveravon Free Church (1843-1900)
    - Inveraven Parish Church (1560-1953), formerly St Peter's Parish Church, Inveraven (ancient-1560)
  - Kirkmichael and Tomintoul Parish Church (1957-200?)
    - Kirkmichael Parish Church (1943-1957)
      - Kirkmichael St Michael's Parish Church (1929-1943), formerly Kirkmichael Parish Church (1560-1929), formerly St Michael's Parish Church, Kirkmichael (ancient-1560)
      - Kirkmichael Dalavrecht Parish Church (1929-1943), formerly Kirkmichael United Free Church (1900-29), formerly Kirkmichael Free Church (1843-1900)
    - Tomintoul Parish Church (1845-1957), formerly Tomintoul Parliamentary Church (1826-45)
- Uist and Barra Parish Church
  - Barra Parish Church (1733-2025), formerly St Barr's Parish Church, Barra (ancient-C16th)
  - Benbecula Parish Church (1929-2025)
    - Benbecula Parish Church (1895-1928), formerly Benbecula Mission Station, formerly St Columba's Parish Church, Benbecula (ancient-C16th)
    - Benbecula United Free Church (1900-29), formerly Benbecula Free Church (1885-1900)
  - Carinish Parish Church (1929-2025), formerly Carinish United Free Church (1900-29), formerly Carinish Free Church (1854-1900)
  - South Uist Parish Church (1978-2025)
    - Daliburgh Parish Church (1929-78), formerly South Uist United Free Church (1900-29), formerly South Uist Free Church (1850s-1900)
    - South Uist Howmore Parish Church (1895-1978), formerly South Uist and Benbecula Parish Church (1733-1895), formerly South Uist, Benbecula and Barra Parish Church (C16th-1733)
      - St Columba's or St Mary's Parish Church, Howmore (ancient-C16th)
      - St Peter's Parish Church, Kilpheder (ancient-C16th)
- Urquhart and Glenmoriston Parish Church (1992-)
  - Glenmoriston Parish Church (1891-1992), foremrly St Irchard's Parish Church, Glenmoriston (ancient-1600)
  - Urquhart Parish Church (1946-92)
    - Kilmichael Parish Church (1929-46), formerly Glenurquhart United Free Church (1900-29), formerly Glenurquhart Free Church (1843-1900)
    - Kilmore Parish Church (1929-46), formerly Urquhart Parish Church (1891-1929), formerly Glenurquhart and Glenmoriston Parish Church (1600-1891), formerly St Drostan's Parish Church, Glenurquhart (ancient-1600)
- Urray and Kilchrist Parish Church (1937-)
  - Urray East Parish Church (1929-37), formerly Urray United Free Church (1900-29), formerly Urray Free Church (1843-1900)
  - Urray West Parish Church (1929-37), formerly Urray Parish Church (1600-1929)
    - Christ's Church, Tarradale (ancient-1600)
    - St Constantine's or St Madidus' Parish Church, Urray or Inverferan (ancient-1600)
- West Cowal Parish Church (2023-)
  - Kilfinan Parish Church (1956-2023), formerly Kilfinan and Kilbride Parish Church (C16th-1956), formerly St Finan's Parish Church, Kilfinan (ancient-C16th)
  - Kilmodan and Colintraive Parish Church (1954-2023)
    - Colintraive Parish Church (1929-1954), formerly Kilmodan and Southhall United Free Church (1900-29), formerly Kilmodan and Southhall Free Church (1843-1900)
    - Kilmodan Parish Church (C16th-1954), formerly St Modan's Parish Church, Kilmodan or Glendaruel (ancient-C16th)
  - Kyles Parish Church (1983-2023)
    - Kames and Kilbride Parish Church (1957-83), formerly Kames Parish Church (1929-57), formerly Kilfinan United Free Church (1900-29), formerly Kilfinnan Free Church (1843-1900)
    - Tighnabruaich Parish Church (1930-83)
      - Tighnabruaich East Parish Church (1929-30), formerly Tighnabruaich United Free Church (1900-29), formerly Tighnabruaich Free Church (1877-1900)
      - Tighnabruaich West Parish Church (1929-30), formerly Tighnabruaich Parish Church (1882-1929), formerly Tighnabruaich Chapel (1862-82)
- West Lochfyneside Parish Church (2019-)
  - Cumlodden, Lochfyneside and Lochgair Parish Church (?-2019), formerly Cumlodden and Lochfyneside Parish Church (1929-?)
    - Cumlodden Parish Church (1853-1929)
    - Lochfyneside United Free Mission Station (1907-29), formerly Lochfyneside United Free Church (1900-07), formerly Lochfyneside Free Church (1843-1900)
  - Glenaray and Inveraray Parish Church (1930-2019)
    - Glenaray Parish Church or Inveraray First Charge (C16th-1930), formerly St Malew's Parish Church, Kilmalew or Glenaray (ancient-C16th)
    - Inveraray Parish Church or Inveraray Second Charge (1651-1930)
    - Inveraray United Free Church (1900-30), formerly Inveraray Free Church (1843-1900)
- West Moray Parish Church (2024/25-)
  - Altyre, Alves, Burghead, Dallas, Findhorn, Forres: St Leonard's, Kinloss, Rafford
  - Dyke and Edinkillie Parish Church (2018-25)
    - Dyke Parish Church (-2018)
    - * Dyke, Moy and Culbin Parish Church (C16th-)
    - * Dyke East Parish Church (1929-), formerly Dyke United Free Church (1900-29), formerly Dyke Free Church (1843-1900)
    - Edinkillie Parish Church (-2018)
    - * Edinkillie Parish Church (ancient-)
    - * Edinkillie West Parish Church (1929-), formerly Edinkillie United Free Church (1900-29), formerly Edinkillie Free Church (1844-1900)
  - Forres St Laurence Parish Church (1929-2024), formerly Forres Parish Church (C16th-1929), formerly St Laurence's Parish Church, Forres (ancient-C16th)
  - Forres Castlehill United Free Church (1900-29), formerly Forres United Presbyterian Church (1847-1900), formerly Forres United Secession Church (1820-47), formerly Forres Antiburgher Church (1768-1820)
  - Forres High United Free Church (1903-29), formerly Forres Cumming Street United Free Church (1900-03), formerly Forres Free Church (1843-1900)
- West Ross Parish Church (2024-), formerly Gairloch and Dundonnell Parish Church (1983-2024)
  - Dundonnell Parish Church (1929-83), previously Little Lochbroom United Free Church (1900s-1929)
  - Gairloch Parish Church (1950-83)
    - Gairloch Parish Church (C16th-1950), formerly St Malrubh's Parish Church, Gairloch (ancient-C16th)
    - Aultbea and Poolewe Parish Church (1930-50)
      - Aultbea United Free Church (1900-09, 1916-1930), formerly Aultbea and Kinlochewe United Free Church (1909-16), formerly Poolewe Free Church (1843-1900)
      - Poolewe Parish Church (1833-1930), formerly Poolewe Parliamentary Church (1828-33)

=== Timeline of local unions following the Union of 1929 ===
1928: Strathconon 1929: Alness, Applecross, Benbecula, Cumlodden/Lochfyneside, Duirinish, Kilmartin, Kilmuir (Skye), Kilninver-Kilmelford, Kinlochbervie, Moy, Portnahaven, Shieldaig, Sleat, Strath 1930: Acharacle, Auldearn, Avoch, Cromdale, Duthil, Erchless, Inveraray, Morvern, Muckairn, Poolewe, Salen, Strathfillan, Tighnabruaich 1931: Creich, Durness, Eddrachillis, Fortrose, Glenelg, Glenorchy, Iona-Ross of Mull, Kilarrow, Kilmallie, Kilninian-Kilmore, Laggan, Lairg, Mallaig, Manish/Scarista, Rothiemurchus, Strathy 1932: Abernethy, Alvie, Assynt, Glenlivet, Kilbrandon-Kilchattan, Kildalton-Oa, Kilmorack, Lochcarron 1933: Appin, Ardclach, (North) Ballachulish, Berneray, Halkirk, Killearnan 1934: Ardchattan, Boleskine, Cromarty, Croy, Fort Augustus, Glencoe, Kilmuir (North Uist), Kirkhill, Knockbain, Logie Easter, Lybster, Petty, Portree, Trumisgarry 1935: Dornoch 1936: Golspie, Sandbank 1937: Dunnet, Kilmun/Strone, Strachur-Strathlachlan, Tongue, Urray 1938: Clyne, Kiltarlity, Latheron, Olrig, Watten 1939: Edderton, Kilchrenan 1940: Kilmuir Easter 1942: Keiss, Lochgilphead, Tain 1943: Dores, Kirkmichael, Rosskeen, Tarbert (Loch Fyne) 1944: Killean (Argyll), Tobermory 1945: Ardrishaig, Cawdor 1946: Lochalsh, Plockton/Kyle, Southend, Tarbat, Urquhart 1947: Bower, Croick/Kincardine, Strathpeffer 1948: Helmsdale, Rogart 1950: Berriedale, Canisbay 1952: Carradale, Lochgoilhead, Tiree 1954: Kilmodan 1955: Farr, Reay 1956: Lochbroom, North Bute 1957: Kingussie 1960: Grantown-on-Spey 1961: Ferintosh 1962: Fearn 1963: Ardersier 1966: Nigg 1970: Kirn 1972: Innellan 1978: South Uist 1979: Snizort 1982: North Knapdale 1983: Gairloch/Dundonnell, Oban 200?: Kingarth 2007: Fort William 2021: Dunoon 2023: Campbeltown 2024: Rothesay 2025: Wick 2026: Nairn

The following towns still have more than one Parish Church: Dingwall, Inverness, Thurso.

== Register of current and former buildings ==
Church	Present-day parish	Built	Rebuilt	Closed
Abernethy New (former Free) Church, Nethy Bridge	Abernethy	1850		—
Abernethy Old Church (St George's)	Abernethy	Medieval	1767	2011
Acharacle Parish Church	Acharacle and Ardnamurchan	1829	—	—
Ardnamurchan (Second) Parish Church, Kilchoan	Acharacle and Ardnamurchan	1831	2023	—
St Comghan's or Coan's, Kilchoan, Ardnamurchan	Acharacle and Ardnamurchan	Medieval	—	c. 1800
St Finan's, Eilean Fhianain	Acharacle and Ardnamurchan	Medieval	—	C16th
Rosskeen (New, former Free) Church, Alness	Alness	1909-10	—	—
Alness New (former Free) Church, Kirkside, Alness	Alness	1843		27 Sept 2025
Rosskeen Old Parish Church (St Ninian's)	Alness	Medieval	1830-32	1947
Alness Old Parish Church	Alness	Medieval	1775	1936
Nonakiln Parish Church (St Ninian's)	Alness	Medieval	—	1713
Insh Church (St Adamnan), Loch Insh (Innis Eoghain)	Alvie & Insh	Medieval	1792	Dec 2025
St Drostan's Church, Alvie	Alvie & Insh	Medieval	1798	2022
Former Alvie Free Church, Kincraig	Alvie & Insh			C20th
Appin Church	Appin & Lismore	Medieval		—
St Moluag or Luag's Cathedral, Lismore	Appin & Lismore	Ancient	1749	2024
Former Appin United Free Church	Appin & Lismore			C20th
St Modan's New Church, Benderloch	Ardchattan	1905		—
Ardchattan Old Church (St Modan's), Achnaba	Ardchattan	Medieval		2019
Ardgour Parish Church	Ardgour, Morvern and Strontian	1829		—
Kingairloch Mission Church	Ardgour, Morvern and Strontian			c. 2023?
Kiel Church (formerly Movern UFC), Morvern	Ardgour, Morvern and Strontian			—
Strontian Parish Church	Ardgour, Morvern and Strontian	1829		—
St Columba's, Kilcholumkill	Ardgour, Morvern and Strontian	Medieval		c. C16th
St Fintan's, Kilintach	Ardgour, Morvern and Strontian	Medieval		c. C16th
Assynt Parish Church, Lochinver	Assynt, Rosehall and Scourie	Medieval		—
Rosehall Church	Assynt, Rosehall and Scourie			—
Eddrachillis Church, Scourie	Assynt, Rosehall and Scourie			—
Stoer Church	Assynt, Rosehall and Scourie	1829^{TC}		C20th
Former Assynt, Elphin and Stoer United Free Church	Assynt, Rosehall and Scourie			C20th
Former Eddrachillis UFC	Assynt, Rosehall and Scourie			C20th
Berneray Parish Church	Berneray and Lochmaddy			—
Lochmaddy Kirk	Berneray and Lochmaddy			—
Former UFC, Berneray	Berneray and Lochmaddy			c. 1933
St Columba's, Sand, North Uist	Berneray and Lochmaddy	Medieval		C16th
Rosemarkie Parish Church	Black Isle East	Medieval	1735, 1821	—
Avoch (North) Parish Church	Black Isle East	Medieval	1872	2023
Cromarty West Church	Black Isle East	1866	—	2023
Fortrose Church	Black Isle East			2012
Cromarty East/Old/St Benet's Church	Black Isle East	Medieval	—	1998
Avoch South (former Free) Church	Black Isle East			C20th
Gaelic Chapel, Cromarty	Black Isle East	1783	—	1918
Fortrose Cathedral	Black Isle East	Medieval	—	C17th
Bracadale Church (=Minginish?)	Bracadale, Duirinish and Snizort	Medieval		—
Duirinish Church	Bracadale, Duirinish and Snizort	Medieval	1829	—
Kensaleyre	Bracadale, Duirinish and Snizort			—
Arnisort	Bracadale, Duirinish and Snizort			—
St Conan's, Uig	Bracadale, Duirinish and Snizort	Medieval		C16th
Trumpan Church, Waternish	Bracadale, Duirinish and Snizort	Medieval	—	1578
Snizort Cathedral	Bracadale, Duirinish and Snizort	Medieval	—	1560
St Maelrubha's, Minginish	Bracadale, Duirinish and Snizort	Medieval		C16th
Campbeltown Church	Campbeltown	1872		—
Highland Church, Campbeltown	Campbeltown	Medieval	1808	2023
Clyne	Central and East Sutherland	Medieval		—
Lairg	Central and East Sutherland	Medieval		—
Helmsdale	Central and East Sutherland			—
St Callan's, Rogart	Central and East Sutherland	Medieval		—
Coll Church, Arinagour	Coll	1907?		—
Colonsay Church, Scalasaig	Colonsay & Oronsay	Medieval?	1804	—
St Oran's, Connel	Connel	1888		—
Dunbeg Church	Connel		1981	—
Contin Parish Church	Contin	Medieval	—	—
Lochluichart Parish Church	Contin	1827^{TC}		—
St John's, Dunoon	Cowal Kirk	1843	1877	—
Kirn Church	Cowal Kirk	1907	—	—
Toward Church	Cowal Kirk			—
High Kirk, Dunoon	Cowal Kirk	Medieval	1816	1 Oct 2023
Sandbank Church	Cowal Kirk	1868	—	2017
Cromdale Church	Cromdale & Advie	Medieval	1812	—
Advie Church	Cromdale & Advie		1874	???
St Bride's, Advie	Cromdale & Advie	Medieval		pre-C19th
Culbokie Church	Culbokie & Munlochy			—
Knockbain New/Free Church, Munlochy	Culbokie & Munlochy	?	1884-86	2024
Resolis Parish Church	Culbokie & Munlochy	1767		2005
Urquhart New Church	Culbokie & Munlochy	1795		2005
Knockbain Old Church, Munlochy	Culbokie & Munlochy	c. 1754	C19th?	1933
Kirkmichael Old Church, Balblair	Culbokie & Munlochy	Medieval	—	c. 1800
Urquhart Old Church	Culbokie & Munlochy	Medieval	1747-51	1790
St Mary's, Kilmuir Wester	Culbokie & Munlochy	Medieval		1764
St Duthac's, (Easter) Suddie	Culbokie & Munlochy	Medieval	—	1762
Cullicudden Parish Church	Culbokie & Munlochy	Medieval	—	1741
Ardersier	Culloden and Ardersier	Medieval		—
Barn, Culloden	Culloden and Ardersier	1977		—
St Ewan's, Bracholy	Culloden and Ardersier	Medieval		C17th
South Knapdale Church, Achahoish	Dalriada Mid Argyll	Medieval?	1775	—
Ardrishaig Church	Dalriada Mid Argyll	1860		—
Kilmartin New Church	Dalriada Mid Argyll	2019		—
Lochgilphead Church	Dalriada Mid Argyll	1828	1885	—
North Knapdale Church, Tayvallich	Dalriada Mid Argyll	1827	1894	—
North Knapdale Church, Kilmichael Inverlussa	Dalriada Mid Argyll	Medieval?		2017
Castle Street Church, Dingwall	Dingwall: Castle Street	1900		—
St Clement's, Dingwall	Dingwall: St Clement's	Medieval	1800-03	—
Dornoch Cathedral	Dornoch Firth	Medieval		—
Edderton New/West Church	Dornoch Firth	1841-42	—	2021
Edderton Old (later Free) Church	Dornoch Firth	Medieval	1743	1988
Durness	Durness and Kinlochbervie	Medieval		—
Kinlochbervie	Durness and Kinlochbervie	1829^{TC}		—
Argyle Square Church, Wick	East Caithness	1842	—	—
Lybster Church	East Caithness	1910		—
Dunbeath Church, Balnabruich	East Caithness	early C20th		2025
St Fergus, Wick	East Caithness	Medieval	1830	29 Dec 2024
Wick Central Church	East Caithness	1806	—	1990
Tarbat Parish Church	Easter Ross Peninsula	???		—
Tain New/Free Church	Easter Ross Peninsula	1891-92		—
Fearn Abbey	Easter Ross Peninsula	Medieval	1772	2023
Nigg Old Church	Easter Ross Peninsula	Medieval	1626	1991
Tain St Duthac's Parish Church	Easter Ross Peninsula	1811-14		???
Tarbat Old Parish Church, Portmahomack	Easter Ross Peninsula	Medieval		???
Tain St Duthac's Old/Memorial Church	Easter Ross Peninsula	Medieval		c. 1814
Ferintosh Parish Church, Conon Bridge	Ferintosh			—
Ferintosh Mission CoS Church, Conon Bridge	Ferintosh	1906	—	1961
Logiebride or Logie Wester Old Church	Ferintosh	Medieval		1792
Strathpeffer Parish Church	Fodderty & Strathpeffer	1890	—	—
Fodderty Old Parish Church	Fodderty & Strathpeffer	Medieval		1904
Fort Augustus	Fort Augustus	1774	1867	—
Abertarff Old Church	Fort Augustus	Medieval		C17th
Kilmallie Church, Corpach	Fort William Kilmallie	Medieval		—
Duncansburgh Church, Fort William	Fort William Kilmallie	1792		—
Macintosh Memorial Church, Fort William	Fort William Kilmallie	1843		2007
Glengarry	Glengarry	1865		—
Tomdoun	Glengarry			—
Glenorchy Church, Dalmally	Glenorchy & Strathfillan	Medieval	1811	—
Bridge of Orchy Church	Glenorchy & Strathfillan	C19th		—
Crianlarich Church	Glenorchy & Strathfillan	1901		2024
Inishail Church, Cladich	Glenorchy & Strathfillan	1736		???
St Fyndoca's, Innishail	Glenorchy & Strathfillan	Medieval		1736
St Andrew's, Golspie	Golspie	Medieval		—
Grantown-on-Spey Church	Grantown-on-Spey & Dulnain Bridge	1803?	1886	—
Dulnain Bridge Church	Grantown-on-Spey & Dulnain Bridge	1904	—	2021
Grantown-on-Spey South Church	Grantown-on-Spey & Dulnain Bridge			1960
Dulnain Bridge Old Church	Grantown-on-Spey & Dulnain Bridge	1914		1930
Inverallan Old Church	Grantown-on-Spey & Dulnain Bridge	Medieval		c. 1803
Invergordon	Invergordon	1861		—
Crown Church, Inverness	Inverness: Crown	1889		—
Hilton Church	Inverness: Hilton	1958		—
Inverness East Church	Inverness: Inshes East	1798	1853	5 Mar 2023
Inshes	Inverness: Inshes East	1835		—
Kinmylies Church	Inverness: Kinmylies	1990s		—
Ness Bank Church	Inverness: Ness Bank	1787		—
St Stephen's, Inverness	Inverness: Old High St Stephen's	1897	—	—
Old High Church, Inverness	Inverness: Old High St Stephen's	Medieval	C18th	Jan 2022
Boleskine Church	Inverness: St Columba	Medieval		—
St Columba's, Inverness	Inverness: St Columba	1843 (N.B.)		—
Bona Church	Inverness: St Columba	Medieval		c. 2017
Dalneigh	Inverness: Trinity Dalneigh	1953		—
Trinity Church, Inverness	Inverness: Trinity Dalneigh	1837		2023
Iona Church	Iona & the Ross of Mull	1828		—
Kilvickeon Church	Iona & the Ross of Mull	1804		—
Ross of Mull or Creich: St Ernan's	Iona & the Ross of Mull	1899		2023
Kilfinichen New Church	Iona & the Ross of Mull	1804		1998
Kilvickeon: St Ernan's or Old Church	Iona & the Ross of Mull	Medieval		pre-1795
Iona: St Ronan's	Iona & the Ross of Mull	Medieval		c. 1560
Inchkenneth Church	Iona & the Ross of Mull			???
Kilfinichen Old Church	Iona & the Ross of Mull	Medieval		C17th
Rothesay Church	Isle of Bute	Medieval	1692, 1795	—
Kilchattan Bay Church, Bute	Isle of Bute	Medieval		2007
St Ninian's Church, Port Bannatyne, Bute	Isle of Bute	1886		2007
St Brendan's, Craigmore, Bute	Isle of Bute	1889		2007
St Bride, Kilbride, Bute	Isle of Bute	Medieval		C18th
Jura Church	Jura	Medieval		—
Kilchrenan Church	Kilchrenan & Dalavich	Medieval		—
Dalavich Church	Kilchrenan & Dalavich	Medieval	1770	—
Killearnan Parish Church	Killearnan	Medieval	1745	—
Kilmonivaig	Kilmonivaig	Medieval		—
Beauly Church	Kilmorack and Erchless	c. 1850		—
Kilmore Church	Kilmore & Oban	Medieval		—
Oban Church	Kilmore & Oban			—
St Columba's, Oban	Kilmore & Oban	1874		2013
Argyll Square Church, Oban	Kilmore & Oban	C19th		1949
St Bride's, Kilbride	Kilmore & Oban	Medieval		C17th
Kilmuir Easter New Church	Kilmuir and Logie Easter			—
Logie Easter New/Free Church	Kilmuir and Logie Easter	1905	—	2024
Logie Easter Third Church	Kilmuir and Logie Easter	1818-19		1988
Logie Easter Second Church	Kilmuir and Logie Easter	1767		1820
Logie Easter Old Church, Marybank	Kilmuir and Logie Easter	Medieval	—	1767
Kilmuir Easter Old Church	Kilmuir and Logie Easter	Medieval	1798	???
Kilmuir Kirk	Kilmuir and Paible	Medieval		—
Kilmuir	Kilmuir & Stenscholl	Medieval		—
Stenscholl	Kilmuir & Stenscholl	1829^{TC}		—
Kiltarlity	Kiltarlity and Kirkhill	Medieval		—
Kirkhill	Kiltarlity and Kirkhill	Medieval		—
Convinth Parish Church	Kiltarlity and Kirkhill	Medieval		C18th
Farnua Parish Church, Bunchrew	Kiltarlity and Kirkhill	Medieval		1618
Kiltearn Parish Church, Evanton	Kiltearn	1893	—	—
Kiltearn Old Church	Kiltearn	Medieval	1791	c. 1946
St Brigh's, Lemlair	Kiltearn	Medieval		1618
Kinnettes Parish Church (?)	Kiltearn	Medieval		C16th
Kingussie Parish Church	Kingussie	Medieval	1792, 1926	—
Insh Village/Free Church	Kingussie	c. 1850		—
St Bride's (prev. St Andrew's), Newtonmore	Laggan & Newtonmore	1897	1957	—
Laggan Church	Laggan & Newtonmore	1785	1842	2024
St Kenneth's, Kinloch Laggan	Laggan & Newtonmore	Medieval		pre-1792
Ullapool	Lochbroom and Ullapool	1829^{TC}		—
Three Holy Brethren, Lochgoilhead	Lochgoilhead & Kilmorich	Medieval		—
Kilmorich Church	Lochgoilhead & Kilmorich	Medieval		—
Leverburgh Kirk	Manish-Scarista			—
Manish Kirk	Manish-Scarista			—
Scarista Kirk	Manish-Scarista			—
St Clement's, Rodel, Harris	Manish Scarista	Medieval		C16th
Killean Church, A'Chleit	Mid Kintyre & Gigha	Medieval	1791	—
Kilcalmonell Church, Clachan	Mid Kintyre & Gigha	Medieval	1760	—
St Brendan's, Skipness	Mid Kintyre & Gigha	1897		—
Gigha Church	Mid Kintyre & Gigha	1923		—
Muckairn Church, Taynuilt	Muckairn	Medieval		—
Nairn Old Church	Nairnshire			—
St Ninian's, Nairn	Nairnshire			—
Auldearn	Nairnshire			—
Kilbrandon Church	Netherlorn	Medieval		—
Kilchattan Church	Netherlorn	Medieval		—
Kilmelford Church	Netherlorn	Medieval		—
St Kiaran's, Kilchoman	North & West Islay	Medieval		—
Thurso West Church	North Coast & the Flows			—
Strathnaver Church, Syre	North Coast & the Flows			—
Reay Church	North Coast & the Flows	Medieval	1739	2025
Strathy Church	North Coast & the Flows	1828^{TC}		—
Halkirk Church	North Coast & the Flows	Medieval		—
Melness Church	North Coast & the Flows			—
St Andrew's, Tongue	North Coast & the Flows			—
Altnaharra Church	North Coast & the Flows	1855		2020
St Thomas, Skinnet	North Coast & the Flows	Medieval		C16th
Kilmore Church	North Mull	1755	1905	—
Salen Church	North Mull	1777	1828, 1899	—
Tobermory Church	North Mull	1828	1897	—
Torosay Church	North Mull	Medieval?	1783	—
Ulva Church	North Mull	1828		2005
Kilninian: St Ninian's	North Mull	Medieval	1755	2000
Kinlochspelvie	North Mull	1828		2000
Lochdon: Free	North Mull	1843		1969
Tobermory: Free	North Mull	1910		1953
Kilcolmkill or Kilmore: St Columba's	North Mull	Medieval		c. 1755
Killean: St John's	North Mull	Medieval		C17th
Lochdonhead Church	North Mull			???
St Columba's, Mallaig	North West Lochaber			—
Canna Old Parish Church	North West Lochaber	Medieval		C16th
Kildonan (Eigg) Old Parish Church	North West Lochaber	Medieval		C16th
Canisbay Church	Pentland	Medieval	C17th	—
Dunnet Church	Pentland	Medieval		—
Keiss Church	Pentland	1827^{TC}		—
Olrig Church	Pentland	Medieval		—
Portree Church	Portree			—
Kilmaluoc Church, Raasay	Portree	Medieval		C16th
St Andrew's, Aviemore	Rothiemurchus & Aviemore	1902		—
St Columba's, Inverdruie, Rothiemurchus	Rothiemurchus & Aviemore	1886		1970s
Doune Church, Rothiemurchus	Rothiemurchus & Aviemore	Medieval		c. 1929
Carradale Church	Saddell & Carradale	Medieval		—
Kilarrow Church	South Islay	Medieval	1767	—
St John's, Port Ellen	South Islay	1898		—
Kildalton Church, Islay	South Islay	Medieval		C18th
Kinlochleven Church	South Lochaber			—
Duror Church	South Lochaber	1827^{TC}		—
Onich Church	South Lochaber	1829		—
St Munda's, Ballachulish	South Lochaber	1845		2023
Eilean Munde Church	South Lochaber	Medieval	C16th	1653
Lochcarron Church	South West Ross	Medieval		—
Applecross Church	South West Ross			—
Kinlochewe Church	South West Ross			—
Glenelg Church	South West Ross	Medieval	C18th	—
Kintail Church	South West Ross	Medieval		—
Lochalsh Church	South West Ross	Medieval		—
Lochcarron Old Parish Church	South West Ross	1836		2005
Lochcarron First Parish Church	South West Ross	1751		???
St Blaan's, Southend	Southend	Medieval	1774	—
Strachur Church	Strachur & Strathlachlan	Medieval		—
Strathlachlan Church	Strachur & Strathlachlan	Medieval		—
Broadford	Strath and Sleat	1840		—
Sleat	Strath and Sleat	Medieval		—
Kyleakin	Strath and Sleat			—
Croy Church	Strathnairn and Strathdearn	Medieval		—
Dalcross Church	Strathnairn and Strathdearn	Medieval		C17th
Tarbert (Harris) Kirk	Tarbert	Medieval		—
Tarbert (Loch Fyne) Church	Tarbert (Loch Fyne) and Kilberry	1775	1864	—
St Columba's, Strone	The Shore Kirk	1859	—	—
St Munn's, Kilmun	The Shore Kirk	Medieval	1841	2017
Ardentinny Church	The Shore Kirk			2017
St Peter's & St Andrew's, Thurso	Thurso: St Peter's & St Andrew's	Medieval?	1832	—
Tomintoul Church	Tomintoul, Glenlivet & Inveravon	1827		—
Inveravon Church	Tomintoul, Glenlivet & Inveravon	Medieval	1808	2025
Glenlivet Church	Tomintoul, Glenlivet & Inveravon	1820s		2004
Kirkmichael Church, Strathavon	Tomintoul, Glenlivet & Inveravon	Medieval	1807	c. 2000
Kirkmichael Dalvrecht Church, Strathavon	Tomintoul, Glenlivet & Inveravon	1843		1943
Tiree Church	Tiree	1776?		—
Kirkapol Church, Gott, Tiree	Tiree	1844		2014
Benbecula Kirk	Uist and Barra	Medieval		—
Carinish Kirk	Uist and Barra			—
Barra Kirk	Uist and Barra	c. 1820		—
Howmore Kirk	Uist and Barra	1859		—
Daliburgh Kirk	Uist and Barra	1869		—
Kilbar (St Barr's) Church, Eoligarry, Barra	Uist and Barra	Medieval		c. 1625
St Mary's (Teampall Mor), Howmore (S Uist)	Uist and Barra	Medieval		post-C16th
Kilpeter Parish Church (South Uist)	Uist and Barra	Medieval		C16th
Glenurquhart (Kilmore)	Urquhart & Glenmoriston	Medieval	1838	—
Corrimony	Urquhart & Glenmoriston	? (N.B.)		—
Glenmoriston Old Parish Church	Urquhart & Glenmoriston	Medieval		C16th
Muir of Ord	Urray and Kilchrist			—
Urray New Church	Urray & Kilchrist	1775-83	—	2024
Urray Old Church	Urray & Kilchrist	Medieval		c. 1775
Kilmodan Church, Clachan of Glendaruel	West Cowal	Medieval	1610, 1783	—
Kyles Church, Kames	West Cowal	1898		—
Inveraray Church	West Lochfyneside	Medieval		—
Cumlodden Church, Furnace	West Lochfyneside	1841		—
Kinloss	West Moray	1657	1765	—
St Michael's, Dallas	West Moray	APC	1794	—
St Leonard's, Forres	West Moray	1844 (1903)	1903	—
St Andrew's, Dyke	West Moray	APC	1781	—
Altyre Parish Church		Medieval		c. 1657
St Ninian's, Moy, near Forres	West Moray	Medieval		c. 1618
Aultbea	West Ross			—
Dundonnell	West Ross			—
Gairloch	West Ross	Medieval		—
Edinkillie Old Church, Logie		Medieval		C18th
St Cainnech, Kilchenzie		Medieval		pre-1800
St Blane, Kingarth, Bute		Medieval		pre-1800
(St Maelrubha's) Rafford Old Parish Church		APC	1754	1820s
Snizort Old Parish Church, Skeabost*		Medieval		C19th
Cill Chriosd (Strath Old Church)*		Medieval	C16th	1840
Risabus or Oa Church, Islay		1828^{TC}		1930
St Kilda Church		pre-1700		1930
(St Mary's) Alves Old Parish Church		APC	1769	1932
Tongue Strathtongue Church		1846		post-1937
Largieside Church (prev. Kilcalmonell Free)		1870		1944
Hallin Church, Kilmuir, Skye		1829^{TC}		???
Plockton Parish Church		1827^{TC}		???
Carnoch Church		1830^{TC}		???
Berneray Parish Church		1829^{TC}		???
Trumisgarry Church, North Uist		1829^{TC}		???
Petty Old Parish Church		Medieval	1839	1950s
Glenshiel Parish Church, Ratagan		1758		C20th?
West Church, Kincardine				1955
St Columba's, Newtonmore		c. 1895		1955
Castlebay Church, Barra		1893		c. 1955
St Andrew's, Thurso		1871		1968
Castlehill Church, Forres		1812	1871	1971
Kilmorack Old Church*		Medieval		1972
West Church, Innellan				1973
Latheron Old Parish Church*		Medieval		1974
Rosebank Church, Nairn		1851		1974
St Colman, North Bute		Medieval		1980
Invermoriston Parish Church		1913		1980s
Leanach Mission Church, near Culloden		1907		1980s
Loth Parish Church*		Medieval		1984
Westerdale Church		1843		1989
Inverchaolain Church		Medieval	1912	1990
Kildonan Parish Church*		Medieval		1990s
Poolewe Parish Church		1828^{TC}		1997
Portsonachan Church				c. 2005
Bruan Church		1910		2007
Berriedale Church		1826^{TC}		2008
Carrick Castle Church		1892		2008
Bridge Street Church, Wick		1843		29 Mar 2009
Iochdar Mission Church, South Uist		1889		c. 2010
Lochboisdale Church, South Uist		pre-1901		???
North Boisdale Church, South Uist				???
Eriboll Church		1804		2010
Moy Church*		Medieval		2011
Tomatin Church		1903		2016
Lochbroom (Clachan) Church*		Medieval		2016
Pitfure Church, Rogart		1910		2017
Ford Church				2018
Bower Church*		Medieval		2018
Sollas Mission Hall, North Uist		1906		c. 2018
Dunlichity Church*		Medieval	1758	2019
Cannich Church		1899		2019
Halladale Mission Church		1911		c. 2020
Dores Church*		Medieval		2020
Glassary Church, Kilmichael Glassary*				2020
Kilmartin Old Church		Medieval	1601, 1835	c. 2020
Shieldaig Church		1827^{TC}		c. 2020
Kilberry Church		1821		2021
St Columba's, Canna		1914		c. 2022
Elgol Church				c. 2022
Craignish Church, Ardfern		Medieval		2023
Kilninver Church		Medieval		2023
Bellanoch Church		1874		2023
Innellan Church		1853		2023
Colintraive Church		1840		2023
Kilfinan Church		Medieval		2023
St Conan's Kirk, Lochawe		1881-86		2023
Rafford New Parish Church		1826		2023
Edinkillie Church, Glenernie		1741		2023
Daviot Parish Church*		Medieval	1826	2023
Dalarossie Church*		Medieval	c. 1800	2023
Cawdor Parish Church*		Medieval		2023
Petty Church, Tornagrain*		1847		2023
Eigg Church		1862		c. 2023
Caol Church		c. 1850		2023
St Ciaran's, Achnacarry				c. 2023
Creich Church, Bonar Bridge*		Medieval		2023
Croick Church		1830^{TC}		2023
Lochgair Church		1867		c. 2023
Alves New Parish Church		1845		31 Dec 2023
Burghead Parish Church		1822	1861	31 Dec 2023
Erchless Church, Struy				2024
Thrumster Church		1900		2024
Corrimony Church		1904		2024
Findhorn Parish Church		1843		2024
Rothesay Trinity Church		1843		2024
Watten Church				2024
Farr Church, Bettyhill		Medieval		2024
Kincardine Church, Ardgay*		Medieval	1909	13 Oct 2024
St Laurence, Forres		APC	1906	29 Dec 2024
Arisaig Kirk		Medieval		2025
Portnahaven Kirk		1828^{TC}		2025
Kilmeny Kirk		Medieval		2025

== See also ==
- List of Church of Scotland parishes
