= List of listed buildings in Glenelg, Highland =

This is a list of listed buildings in the parish of Glenelg in Highland, Scotland.

== List ==
Name	Location	Date Listed	Grid Ref. (Note: Sometimes known as OSGB36, the grid reference (where provided) is based on the British national grid reference system used by the Ordnance Survey. • "Guide to National Grid". Ordnance Survey. • "Get-a-map". Ordnance Survey.)	Geo-coordinates	Notes	LB Number (Note: Historic Environment Scotland assign a unique alphanumeric identifier to each designated site in Scotland, for listed buildings this always begins with "LB", for example "LB12345".)	Image
Railway Houses, Mallaig				57°00′15″N 5°49′51″W	Category B	13037	Upload Photo
Glenelg Village 2 Terraces In Main Street Including Post Office, No 4 Glenelg, Miss Chisholm's And Drumfern (All Former Officers' Quarters; 4 Dwellings To Each Side Of Road)				57°12′47″N 5°37′18″W	Category B	7237	Upload Photo
Bernera Barracks				57°12′58″N 5°37′12″W	Category A	7252	Upload another image
Glenelg Slipway (Kylerhea Ferry)				57°13′45″N 5°39′20″W	Category B	51306	Upload another image See more images
Mallaig Station				57°00′21″N 5°49′46″W	Category C(S)	43567	Upload Photo
Knoydart, Kilchoan Square Burial Ground				57°01′47″N 5°39′43″W	Category B	7229	Upload Photo
Byres At Right Angles To And Behind Nos 5, 6, 7, 8 Corran				57°07′27″N 5°33′08″W	Category B	7232	Upload Photo
Eilanreach Barn				57°11′57″N 5°37′51″W	Category B	7234	Upload Photo
5, 6, 7, 8 Corran				57°07′28″N 5°33′10″W	Category B	7253	Upload Photo
Balcraggie (Former Glenelg Manse)				57°13′01″N 5°35′47″W	Category B	7251	Upload Photo
Kinloch Hourn, Cottage To South Of Steading (Lochournhead House)				57°06′16″N 5°23′09″W	Category B	13443	Upload Photo
Knoydart, Inverie, Scottas House				57°02′29″N 5°42′39″W	Category B	7226	Upload Photo
Knoydart, Kilchoan Round Burial Ground				57°01′47″N 5°39′43″W	Category B	7228	Upload Photo
Mallaig Roman Catholic Church Of St Patrick				57°00′16″N 5°49′49″W	Category C(S)	7230	Upload another image
Glenelg Church (Church Of Scotland) And Graveyard				57°12′42″N 5°37′27″W	Category B	7235	Upload another image
Kinloch Hourn Steading, (The Farm)				57°06′17″N 5°23′09″W	Category C(S)	7224	Upload Photo
Knoydart, Inverie House				57°01′57″N 5°40′15″W	Category B	7225	Upload Photo
Kylerhea Ferry Old Ferry Inn				57°13′51″N 5°39′19″W	Category B	7238	Upload Photo
Bracorina, Former Chapel Subsequently School				56°58′12″N 5°44′37″W	Category C(S)	7223	Upload Photo
Glenelg War Memorial				57°12′40″N 5°37′43″W	Category A	7236	Upload another image
Knoydart, Inverie, Church Of Scotland				57°02′08″N 5°40′49″W	Category C(S)	7227	Upload Photo
Morar Roman Catholic Church Of St Cumin And Presbytery				56°58′06″N 5°48′31″W	Category C(S)	7231	Upload Photo
Corran, Fishing Stores				57°07′26″N 5°33′15″W	Category B	7233	Upload Photo

== Key ==
The scheme for classifying buildings in Scotland is:

- Category A: "buildings of national or international importance, either architectural or historic; or fine, little-altered examples of some particular period, style or building type."
- Category B: "buildings of regional or more than local importance; or major examples of some particular period, style or building type, which may have been altered."
- Category C: "buildings of local importance; lesser examples of any period, style, or building type, as originally constructed or moderately altered; and simple traditional buildings which group well with other listed buildings."

In March 2016 there were 47,288 listed buildings in Scotland. Of these, 8% were Category A, and 50% were Category B, with the remaining 42% being Category C.

== See also ==
- List of listed buildings in Highland
