= Glenelg Church =

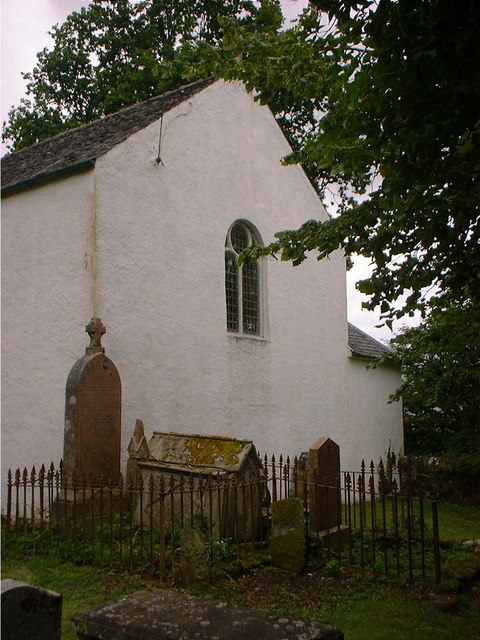
- The church in 2001
- Glenelg Church
- 57°12′43″N 5°37′27″W
- Denomination: Church of Scotland

Glenelg Church is a Category B listed building in Glenelg, Highland, Scotland. Of Church of Scotland denomination, the church dates to the 18th century. It is within the presbytery of Clèir Eilean Ì, and in the extended parish of South West Ross, which merged the parishes of Lochcarron, Applecross, Kinlochewe, Glenelg, Kintail and Lochalsh. The minister is Frederick (Fred) Vincent. Formerly, it was within the Presbytery of Lochcarron–Skye and in the parish of Glenelg, Kintail and Lochalsh.

The congregation was split at the disruption, with a number of congregants forming the Free Church of Scotland in the Glenelg area.

== The building ==
It is a rectangular harled building, with its west gable and rendered and outlined in ashlar. Repairs were carried out between 1821 and 1830, and the interior was re-cast in 1863 and 1929.

An 18th-century bird-cage bellcote is on the west gable, with a stone cross adorning the east. It has a slate roof.

Three windows with 19th-century glazing are in the south elevation.

== Graveyard ==
There is one late 17th-/early 18th-century grave slab, with various others of 19th- and 20th-century dates.

== History ==
The church of Glenelg was dedicated to St Cuimen (the 7th Abbot of Iona between 657 and 699).

On 1 May 1650, the area of Glenelg parish was severed from the Presbytery of Lorn, and incorporated into the Presbytery of Skye. This lasted for a short time, and then it was soon given back to the Presbytery of Lorn.

On 19 May 1724, The Presbytery of Lochcarron and the Synod of Glenelg were begun. The parish of Glenelg was joined into the Lochcarron Presbytery at this point.

Volume VII of the Fasti Ecclesiae Scoticanae, published in 1928, records that there were mission chapels at Arnisdale and Lochhournhead. After the Disruption, a Free Church of Scotland was created (which later became the United Free Church). With the reunification in 1929, this building became Glenelg East Church. On 2 July 1931, it was united to Glenelg West (the original parish church). Following the union, the East Church became the Church Hall and the East Manse was sold.

On 30 June 1968, Glenelg Church was linked with Glenshiel Church (near Ratagan). On 30 April 1972, Kintail was further added to the linkage.

On 23 March 1987, the individual congregations of Glenelg, Glenshiel and Kintail became a union, and the charge was named Glenelg and Kintail.

== Usage ==
The church is used weekly at 12:45pm for a service (to allow Minister and other worship leaders a chance to get there after leading worship elsewhere - usually Lochcarron and Lochalsh). The building is also used in the evenings, at 6pm, by the Glenelg, Arinsdale, Lochalsh & Glenshiel (Glenelg & Inverinate) Free Church of Scotland.

== See also ==
- List of listed buildings in Glenelg, Highland
