= Old High St Stephen's =

Church in Inverness, Scotland

Old High St Stephen's Church of Scotland
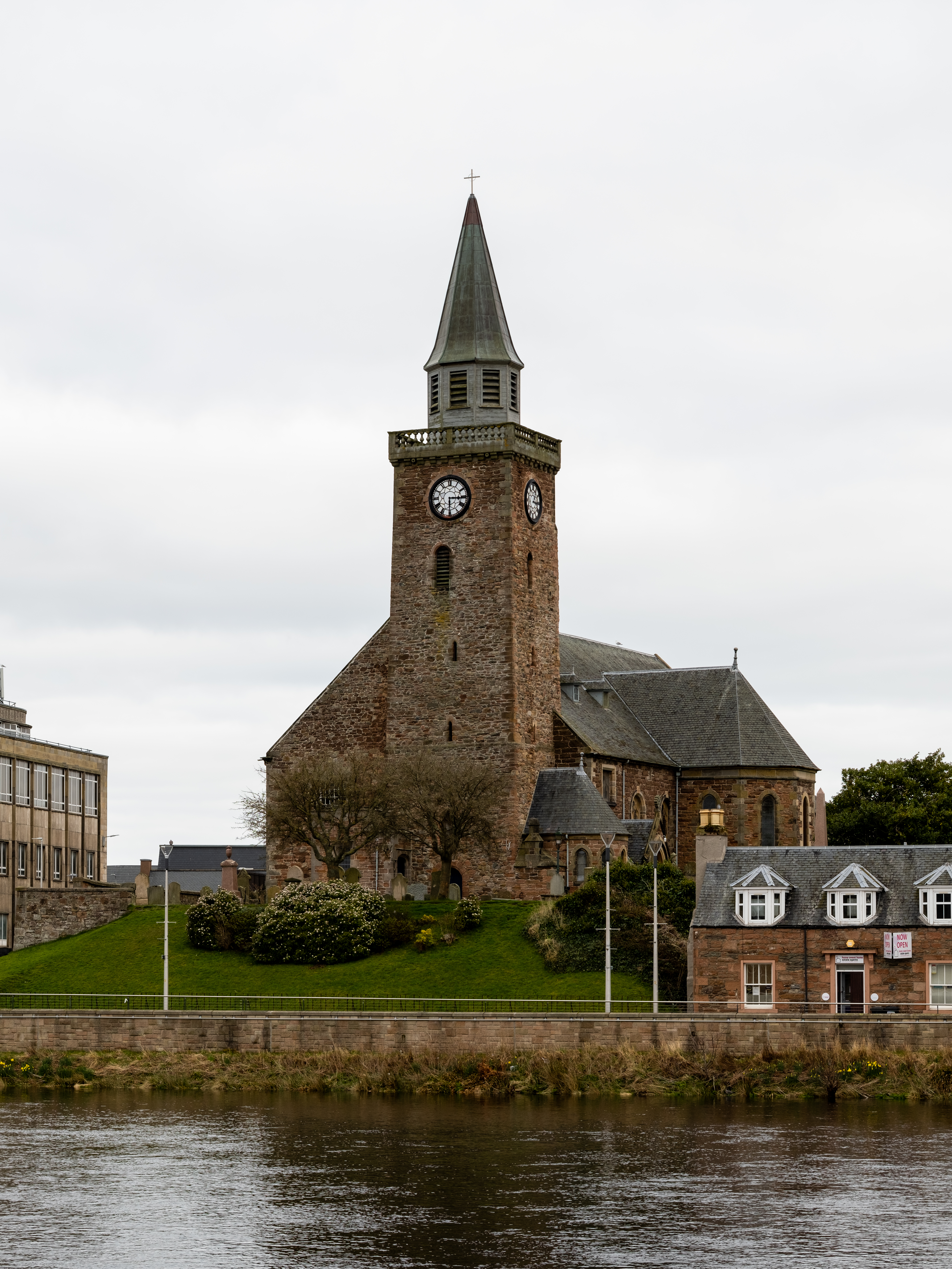
- Old High Church
- Old High St Stephen's Church of Scotland
- Denomination: Church of Scotland
- Churchmanship: Presbyterian
- Website: www.oldhighststephens.com

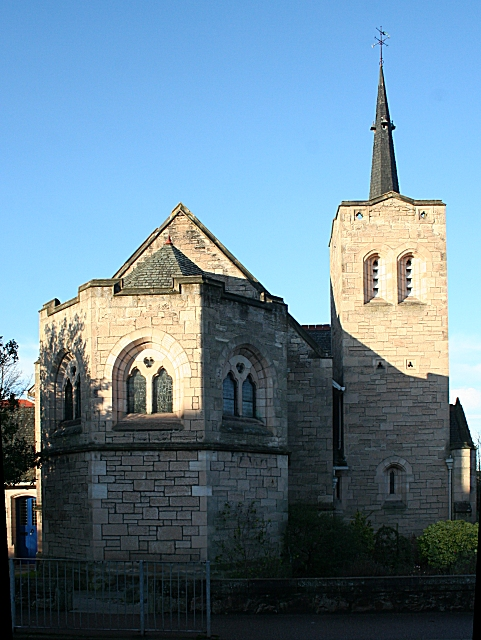
St Stephen's Church

Old High St Stephen's Church (Scottish Gaelic: Seann Eaglais Ard) is a parish church of the Church of Scotland in Inverness, the capital city of the Highlands of Scotland. The congregation was formed on 30 October 2003 by a union of the congregations of Inverness Old High (57.4801°N 4.2289°W) and Inverness St Stephen's (57.4730°N 4.2186°W). Unusually in a union of Church of Scotland congregations, both buildings were retained for worship. In January 2022, regular worship ended at Old High. Since then, the Sunday service takes place at St Stephen's Church at 10:30am

The Old High congregation was the oldest congregation in Inverness. The church—the historic town church of Inverness—mainly dates from the eighteenth century. Its site, overlooking the banks of the River Ness, has been used for worship since Celtic times. Thus the congregation can claim to have been founded by St Columba, the Irish monk who first brought Christianity to Inverness. Among many notable features is a Father Willis organ, restored in 2010. The Old High Church is a category A listed building.

St Stephen's was founded as a 'daughter church' of the Old High in 1897. It is a gothic building in Morayshire freestone, designed by WL Carruthers. St Stephen's is a category B listed building.

The parish area includes the city centre, part of the Crown area, and the southern suburbs of the city, including Drummond and Lochardil.

The Old High Church was on the market for offers over £150,000.

The first minister of the united charge was the Reverend Peter W Nimmo, who was inducted in August 2004. He had previously been minister of High Carntyne in Glasgow. Rev James Bissett, an Ordained Local Minister, is currently serving as locum for the united charge.

In August 2025 the church was sold to a charity called "Save Old High Inverness".

== See also ==
- Columba
- List of Church of Scotland parishes
- Saint Stephen
