= Telford Parliamentary church =

Telford Parliamentary church also known as the Telford Kirks are a series of presbyterian churches in Scotland built with money voted from the parliament of the United Kingdom as a result of the Church of Scotland Act 1824 for a grant of £50,000, designed by the surveyor William Thomson and built by the Scottish stonemason and architect Thomas Telford. In total, 32 churches were built and many are still in use today. Others have been abandoned, e.g. at Stoer, while others were destroyed and rebuilt, e.g. at Tobermory, while others have been converted to dwellings.

== History ==
At the beginning of the 19th century, the provision of churches in the whole of Britain, and in the Highlands in particular, no longer matched the spiritual and religious requirements of the population. Most Highland parishes were large areas of rough mountainous land, and many parishioners, especially those who had been cleared from the land, or who lived in one of the new villages that were coming into existence around that time, lived so far from the parish kirk that they could not attend worship regularly, which was seen as a bad thing. Besides gaps in the provision by the Church of Scotland, there were also pockets of other religious denominations, including Roman Catholic and a variety of minor sects, which were seen as undesirable by the Church of Scotland and by the government.

After the Napoleonic Wars, Parliament made available £1,000,000 in 1819, with a further £500,000 in 1824, for the building of churches and chapels for the Church of England, as an expression of gratitude to God for victory. 214 "Commissioners' Churches" were built or refurbished; one of these alone is said to have cost the best part of £77,000 (equivalent to £6 million in 2014), though much of this was not government money.

A similar proposal to provide £200,000 for the Church of Scotland was delayed for years by various political difficulties and obstruction, and when an amended Bill was eventually passed in 1824, it provided just £50,000 for the whole of the Highlands. No more than 30 kirks with manses were to be built, and no more than £1500 (equivalent to £125,000 in 2014) was to be spent on any one site. A similar Bill for the Lowlands failed altogether in 1825. So the whole of Scotland got a Parliamentary grant of less than was spent on one single Church of England building; and the majority of parishes, and parishioners, in Scotland got nothing at all.

The task of selecting the sites and overseeing the work was entrusted to the Commissioners for Building Highland Roads and Bridges, and in particular to their Chief Surveyor Thomas Telford. The Bill required that the heritors, should apply for a new kirk to be built on land that they would make available, and in August 1825 the Commissioners considered 78 applications; eighteen more were received by June 1826, and eventually, and not without difficulty, sites were chosen for 32 kirks and 41 manses, the extra manses to be provided where there was already a kirk, but no manse.

== Design ==
Between 1823 and 1830, Telford was responsible for the management of construction of the highland churches northwards from Islay to the Shetland. In the year between 1823 and 1824 he prepared estimates, plans and specifications for a standardised structure that was based on one submitted proposal of his three surveyors, James Smith, Joseph Mitchell and William Thomson. Thomson had asked his three surveyors to submit designs for a kirk and manse with a specific budget and caveat that the kirk had to be constructed in a manner that would resist a stormy climate. The eventual plans that were adopted came from William Thomson and considered austere in design.

The layout of each church followed a simple rectangular or a T-plan design each with small belfry. In a rectangular design the tall lattice windows are located in the side walls. For the T-plan, an extension was built at the rear with the lattice windows are on the side walls. The standardised windows design was used so that they could be supplied ready made by James Abernethy of Aberdeen. Original window frames survive in several churches e.g. in Croick, Iona and Ullapool. The doors also standardised, used four-centred arches for support.

== List of churches by location ==
Telford Parliamentary church
Name	Parish	Image	Formal name	Built by	Built date	Grant	Declared	Reference, location and notes
Acharacle	Kilchoan, Argyll		Acharacle Parish Church	William Thomson	1829	£1478 12s 7d	Declared a Quoad sacra parish by an Act of Assembly on 25 May 1833 and erected as such by the Court of Tiends on 8 June 1859.	56.748732°N 5.803508°W
Ardgour	Kilmallie, Lochaber		Ardgour Parish Church	John Davidson and Thomas Macfarlane	1829	£697 17s 3d	Declared a Quoad sacra parish by an Act of Assembly on 25 May 1833 and erected as such by the Court of Tiends on 31 December 1845.	56.7267312°N 5.253481°W
Berneray	Kilbride, Harris		Converted into a private house	John Davidson and Thomas Macfarlane	1829	£1500 for kirk and manse		57.722737°N 7.17193°W
Berriedale	Latheron		Berriedale Church	William Davidson	1826	£1473 18s 1d	Declared a Quoad sacra parish by an Act of Assembly on 25 May 1833 and erected as such by the Court of Tiends on 9 December 1846.	58.189167°N 3.496111°W
Carnoch	Contin		Converted into a private house	John Davidson and Thomas Macfarlane	1830	£1500	Declared a Quoad sacra parish by an Act of Assembly on 25 May 1833 and erected as such by the Court of Tiends on 16 March 1864. The last parliamentary church built in the highlands.	57.542508°N 4.855508°W
Croick	Kincardine, Ross and Cromarty		Croick Parish Church	James Smith	1830	£1426 10s 11d	Declared a Quoad sacra parish by an Act of Assembly on 25 May 1833 and erected as such by the Court of Tiends on 4 March 1846.	57.886183°N 4.604583°W
Cross	Parish of Barvas, Ross and Cromarty				1829	£1470	Declared a Quoad sacra parish by an Act of Assembly on 25 May 1833 and erected as such by the Court of Tiends on 27 May 1857.	Demolished.
Duror	Appin, Argyll		Duror Parish Church	John Gibb and William Minto	1827	£1470	Declared a Quoad sacra parish in 1827	56.646278°N 5.273959°W
Hallin	Kilmuir, Inverness-shire			John Davidson and Thomas Macfarlane	1829	£1470	Declared a Quoad sacra parish by an Act of Assembly on 25 May 1833 and erected as such by the Court of Tiends on 14 July 1847.	57.540556°N 6.600833°W
Iona	Kilfinichen and Kilvickeon, Argyll			William Thomson	1828	£1503 4s		56.332625°N 6.394314°W
Keiss	Wick, Caithness			James Smith	1827	£1459 6s 6d	Declared a Quoad sacra parish by an Act of Assembly on 25 May 1833 and erected as such by the Court of Tiends on 9 December 1846.	58.532778°N 3.121111°W
Kinlochbervie	Eddrachillis			William Davidson	1829	£1452 6s 2d	Declared a Quoad sacra parish in 1834	58.459326°N 5.051455°W
Kinlochluichart	Contin			James Smith	1827	£1489 3s 3d	Declared a Quoad sacra parish by an Act of Assembly on 25 May 1833 and erected as such by the Court of Tiends on 16 May 1864.	57.622717°N 4.819167°W
Kinlochspelve	Torosay and Kinlochspelve, Isle of Mull			William Thomson	1828	£1492 5s 3d		56.36527°N 5.80244°W A rather austere three bay two storeyed manse was built by Telford in Barachandroman. The manse faces west towards Loch Uisg. The church been converted to a private house and is now used as a holiday let.
Knock, Eye Peninsula, Isle of Lewis, Ross-shire	Steornabhagh	Remaining archival material included the elevated plan of the floor and a series of manuscripts are held in the archive collections of Historic Environment Scotland			1829	£1470	Declared a Quoad sacra parish by an Act of Assembly on 25 May 1833 and erected as such by the Court of Tiends on 27 May 1857.	58.206149°N 6.2905146°W Demolished.
Lochgilphead	Glassary, Argyll	Several archive items exist for the demolished church, including an image of the former manse. Other interesting archive items are the floor elevation, manuscripts original to the period and archaeological nomenclature.		John Gibb and William Minto	1828	£1474 14s 2d		56.039440°N 5.432679°W The church was demolished and a new church built on the same location at the top of Argyll Street.
North Ballachulish	Parish of Kilmallie	An archive from the parliamentary church has an image with an intimate view of the former graveyard. Other items in the collection include an elevation plan of the church, maps and manuscripts.		John Davidson and Thomas Macfarlane	1829	£1500	Declared a Quoad sacra parish by an Act of Assembly on 25 May 1833 and erected as such by the Court of Tiends on 31 December 1845.	56.700552°N 5.193803°W Rebuilt
Risabus or Oa	Kildalton, Argyll		The Oa Parish Church, Risabus	John Gibb and William Minto of Aberdeen	1828	£1470	Declared a Quoad sacra parish in 1849	55.612189°N 6.267417°W The church was set on fire in 1915 and finally closed in 1930.
Plockton	Lochalsh, Ross and Cromarty		Plockton Parish Church	John Davidson and Thomas Macfarlane	1827	£1480 15s	Declared a Quoad sacra parish by an Act of Assembly on 25 May 1833.	57.336389°N 5.654167°W
Poolewe	Gairloch, Ross and Cromarty		Poolewe Parish Church	John Gibb and William Minto	1828	£1470	Declared a Quoad sacra parish by an Act of Assembly on 25 May 1833 and erected as such by the Court of Tiends on 3 December 1851.	57.336389°N 5.654167°W
Portnahaven	Kilchoman, Argyll		Portnahaven Parish Church	John Gibb and William Minto	1828	£1513 15s 10d	Declared a Quoad sacra parish in 1849	55.681056°N 6.506667°W
Quarff	Brassa, Burra and Quarff, Burra, Shetland		Quarff Parish Kirk	John Davidson and Thomas Macfarlane	1830	£1498 12s 7d	Declared a Quoad sacra parish by an Act of Assembly on 25 May 1833.	60.101389°N 1.231111°W
Shieldaig	Applecross, Ross and Cromarty		Shieldaig Parish Church	John Davidson and William Macfarlane	1827	£1480 15s	Declared a Quoad sacra parish by an Act of Assembly on 25 May 1833	56.7267312°N 5.253481°W Original church found to unsafe, so new church built on the remaining one or two foot of walls remaining.
Steinscholl	Kilmuir, Inverness-shire		Skye, Staffin, Stenscholl Parish Church	John Davidson and William Macfarlane	1829	£1470	Declared a Quoad sacra parish by an Act of Assembly on 25 May 1833 and erected as such by the Court of Tiends on 14 July 1847.	57.626111°N 6.205833°W
Stoer	Parish of Assynt, Sutherland			William Davidson	1829	£1470 6s 2d	Declared a Quoad sacra parish in 1834.	58.202222°N 5.336111°W
Strathy	Parish of Farr, Sutherland			James Smith	1828	£1470	Declared a Quoad sacra parish by an Act of Assembly on 25 May 1833 and erected as such by the Court of Tiends on 4 February 1846.	58.5592°N 4.0039°W Now converted to a house
Strontian	Kilchoan, Argyll		Strontian Church of Scotland	William Thomson	1829	£1502 10s 8d	Declared a Quoad sacra parish in 1833	56.702019°N 5.569700°W
Tobermory	Kilninian and Kilmore	The Historic Environment Scotland archive has a single image which details the plan, and elevation of the church and specifically a plan for a one-storey manse or a two-storey manse choices. The choice of which manse to build makes the plan unusual as there is no evidence of dual choice in any other archaeological plan.		William Thomson	1828	£1539 10s 5d		56.623582°N 6.070196°W Replaced with a Victorian Gothic church in 1897.
Tomintoul	Kirkmichael, Banffshire		Tomintoul Parish Church	John Gibb and William Minto	1827	£1486 5s	Declared a Quoad sacra parish by an Act of Assembly on 25 May 1833	56.623847°N 6.071421°W
Truimsgarry	North Uist			John Davidson and William Macfarlane	1829	£1470	Declared a Quoad sacra parish by an Act of Assembly on 25 May 1833 and erected as such by the Court of Tiends on 11 June 1845.	57.653799°N 7.254220°W Roof missing
Ullapool	Lochbroom, Highland		Lochbroom & Ullapool Parish Church		1829	£900	Declared a Quoad sacra parish by an Act of Assembly on 25 May 1833 and erected as such by the Court of Tiends on 16 March 1859.	57.896389°N 5.163056°W Now houses Ullapool Museum.
Ulva	Kilninian and Kilmore		Salen and Ulva Parish Church	William Thomson	1828	£1495 14s 1d	Declared a Quoad sacra parish by an Act of Assembly on 25 May 1833	56.480361°N 6.165278°W a new church replaced the Telford church on 9 July 1899. It cost £1300 and seated 260 being substantially bigger. The church was dedicated to St Elvan of Ardstraw.
