= Crown Church, Inverness =

Crown Church Inverness
- Crown United Free Church
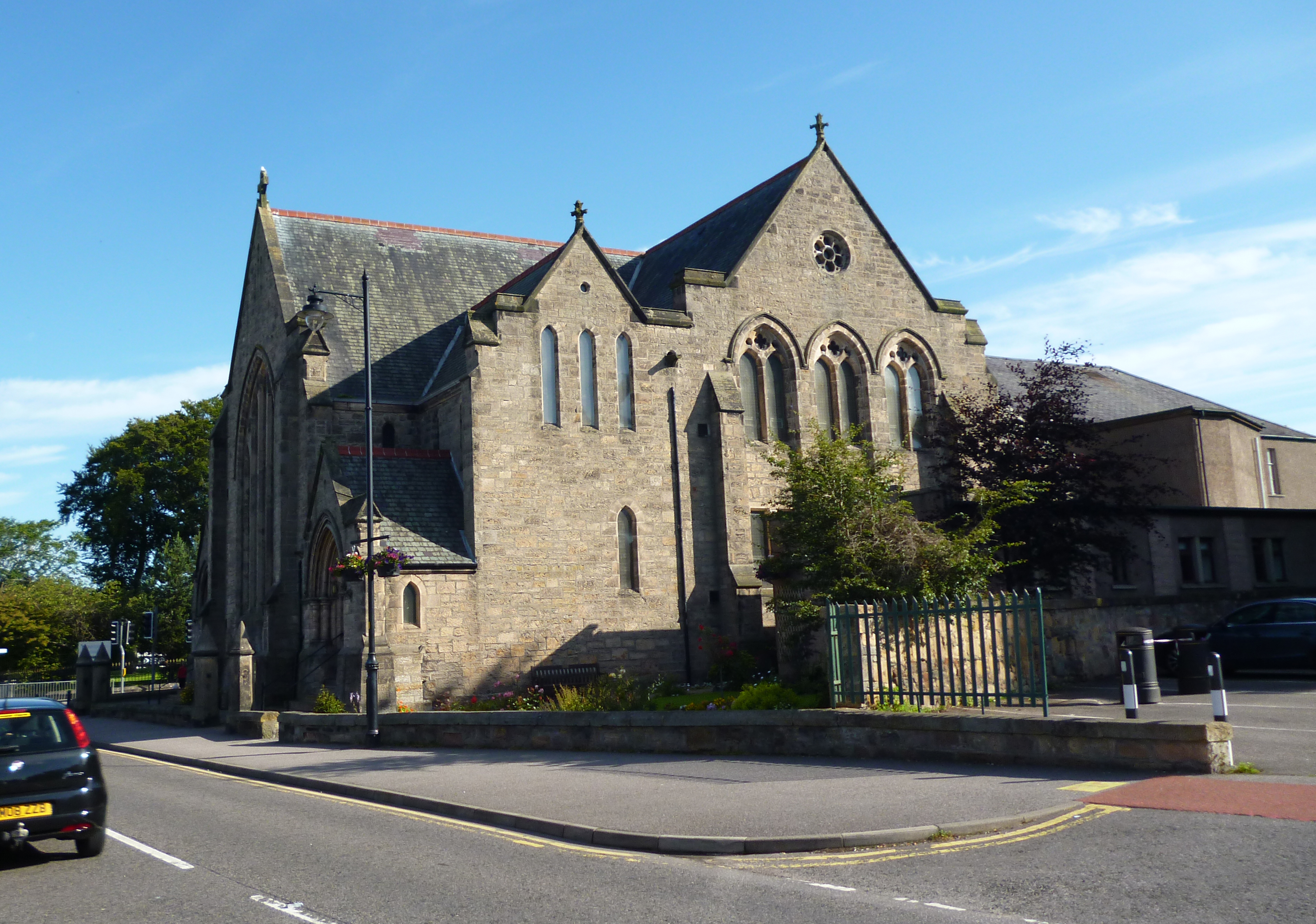
- Crown Church Inverness
- Crown Church Inverness
- 57°28′38″N 4°13′7″W
- Location: Inverness
- Country: Scotland
- Denomination: Church of Scotland
- Previous denomination: United Free Church of Scotland
- Website: crown-church.co.uk

Architecture
- Functional status: Active
- Architect: James Robert Rhind
- Style: Early English Gothic revival
- Completed: 20 November 1901
- Construction cost: £5,000 (equivalent to £531,300 in 2025)

Specifications
- Capacity: 800 persons

Crown Church is a parish church in Inverness in the Scottish Highlands, located at the junction of Midmills Road and Kingsmills Road near the city centre.

== History ==
The first minister (1899–1907) was the Reverend William Todd, renowned for his fervent evangelical preaching. The foundation stone was laid on 24 November 1900 by Revd. Principal Robert Rainy, D.D., first moderator of the United Free Church of Scotland. Jars were deposited in the foundations containing copies of local and other newspapers, current coins of the realm, Town Council minutes and United Free Church records.

Originally built for the Free Church of Scotland, the church buildings were opened in 1901. The contractors were Mason, Alex Cameron: carpenters, Grant & Johnson: slater, Adam Taylor & Son: plumber, A.J. Russell: plasterer, Alex Fraser: painter, Thomas Tulloch: heating, Rose Street Foundry: gas fittings, Norman and Ernest Spittle, Birmingham.

The designer of the building was Inverness born architect James Robert Rhind, a successful architect who had been trained in his father’s practice. His designs were selected for 7 libraries around Glasgow following Andrew Carnegie’s gift of £100,000 to the city in 1901. His landmark buildings were greatly enhanced by his liberal use of columns, domes and sculpted features. Rhind’s best known buildings in the North of Scotland are the Royal Golf Hotel and the Crown Church, Inverness.

By this time the building opened the congregation had become part of the United Free Church of Scotland, which in turn united with the Church of Scotland in 1929, thus reuniting Scotland's largest Presbyterian denominations.

In 2004 the congregation had 820 members, making Crown Church the largest Church of Scotland congregation in Inverness in terms of membership.

== Organ ==
The church contains a 3 manual and pedal pipe organ.

== See also ==
- List of Church of Scotland parishes
