= Quoad sacra parish =

Type of parish in the Church of Scotland

A quoad sacra parish is a parish of the Church of Scotland which does not represent a civil parish. That is, it had ecclesiastical functions but no local government functions. Since the Local Government (Scotland) Act 1929, civil parishes have had no local government functions, and are of statistical and historical interest only. Typically a number of quoad sacra parishes can exist within a single civil parish, each maintaining its own parish church. Quoad sacra translates from Latin as "concerning sacred matters". Where a civil and an ecclesiastical parish are coterminous, the area is designated a "parish proper", a parish quoad omnia ("concerning all"), or a parish quoad civilia et sacra ("concerning the civil and the sacred").

The term appears from around 1800 in cities where rapid expansion created a demand for more church seats, without the creation of new civil parishes. Unlike a chapel of ease which served a similar function, a quoad sacra church had no obligation to bury its congregation, and so these churches lack burial grounds.

With the expansion of other rival denominations, especially the United Presbyterian Church and (from the Disruption of 1843) the Free Church of Scotland, the distinction became less and less critical, and by 1900 was used only in legal documents.

== Role ==
The distinction between ecclesiastical and civil parishes was often blurred. Civil parishes had the duty of setting church rates, in addition to their civil roles in the provision of education, sanitation and the poor law.

== Legislation ==
Particular Acts of Parliament which created quoad sacra parishes in Scotland are the New Parishes (Scotland) Act 1844, the United Parishes (Scotland) Act 1868 and the United Parishes (Scotland) Act 1876.

== List of quoad sacra parishes, 1844-1929 ==
In 1929-1930 the Church of Scotland gained hundreds of new parishes from the Union with the Free Church, and civil parishes were abolished altogether. This list therefore stops there.

This list does not include those parishes created quoad omnia during this period; see List of civil parishes in Scotland.

Parish	Erected	Disjoined from
St Andrews: St Leonard's	1844	St Andrews (Fife)
Bernera	11th Jun 1845	Harris
Deerness	11th Jun 1845	St Andrews (Orkney)
Foss	11th Jun 1845	Dull
Innerwick in Glenlyon	11th Jun 1845	Fortingall, Weem
Iona	11th Jun 1845	Kilfinichen, Kilvickeon
Kinloch Rannoch	11th Jun 1845	Fortingall, Logierait
Kinlochspelvie	11th Jun 1845	Torosay
Salen	11th Jun 1845	Torosay, Kilmore
Tobermory	11th Jun 1845	Kilmore
Trumisgarry	11th Jun 1845	North Uist
Ulva	11th Jun 1845	Kilninian, Kilmore
Tomintoul	25th Jun 1845	
Ballachulish	3rd Dec 1845	Appin
Kinlochbervie	4th Feb 1846	Eddrachillis
Strathy	4th Feb 1846	Farr
Croick	4th Mar 1846	Kincardine
Keiss	4th Mar 1846	Wick, Canisbay
Lochgilphead	4th Mar 1846	Glassary, South Knapdale
Berriedale	9th Dec 1846	Latheron
Duror	9th Dec 1846	Lismore
Muckairn	9th Dec 1846	Ardchattan
North Ronaldsay	2nd Jun 1847	Cross and Burness
Hallin in Waternish	14th Jul 1847	Duirinish
Stenscholl	14th Jul 1847	Kilmuir, Snizort
Leith: St Thomas's	8th Dec 1847	South Leith
Kilmeny	13th May 1849	Kilarrow
Portnahaven	30th May 1849	Kilchoman
The Oa	30th May 1849	Kildalton
Edinburgh: Gaelic	27th Nov 1850	
Ardrossan: New Parish	5th Mar 1851	Ardrossan, West Kilbride
Savoch	28th May 1851	Deer, New Deer, Ellon, Tarves
Enzie	8th Jun 1851	Rathven, Bellie
Dunfermline: St Andrew's	11th Jun 1851	Dunfermline
Houndwood	9th Jul 1851	Coldingham
Edinburgh: St Bernard's	19th Nov 1851	St Cuthbert's
Tenandry	19th Nov 1851	Dull, Blair Atholl, Moulin
Glasgow: St Columba's	3rd Dec 1851	
Poolewe	3rd Dec 1851	Gairloch
Aberdeen: Gilcomston	14th Jul 1852	St Machar's
Glasgow: St Matthew's	14th Jul 1852	
Dalkeith: West	1853	Dalkeith
Brydekirk	26th Jan 1853	Annan, Hoddam
Camelon	Mar 1853	Falkirk
New Pitsligo	9th Mar 1853	Tyrie, Aberdour, Strichen, New Deer
Glasgow: Laurieston	29th Jun 1853	Kingston
Cumlodden	13th Jul 1853	Inveraray, Glassary
Glasgow: Bridgeton	13th Jul 1853	
Glasgow: St Peter's	13th Jul 1853	
Dumfries: St Mary's	1854	Dumfries
Crosshill	8th Mar 1854	Kirkmichael, Kirkoswald
Logiealmond	20th Dec 1854	Monzie, Moneydie, Lt Dunk, Methv, Redg, Fowlis W
Dunfermline: North	24th Jan 1855	
Arbroath: Inverbrothock	7th Mar 1855	St Vigeans
Newark	27th Mar 1855	Port Glasgow
Melville	27th Jun 1855	Montrose
Wishaw	25th Sep 1855	Cambusnethan
Edgerston	Jul 1855	Jedburgh, Oxnam, Southdean
Glasgow: Chalmers	5th Jul 1855	
Greenock: Gaelic	5th Jul 1855	Greenock
Larkhall	5th Jul 1855	Dalserf
Galashiels: Ladhope	11th Jul 1855	Melrose
Auchencairn	11th Jun 1856	Rerrick
Portlethen	25th Jun 1856	Banchory Devenick
Cross	27th May 1857	Barvas
Knock	27th May 1857	Stornoway
Gourock	8th Jul 1857	Inverkip, Greenock West
Lochryan	3rd Mar 1858	Inch
Gartsherrie	17th Mar 1858	Old Monkland
Millbrex	14th Jul 1858	Fyvie, Monquhitter
Glenshee	24th Nov 1858	Kirkmichael in Strathardail
Edinburgh: Buccleuch	2nd Feb 1859	St Cuthbert's
Ullapool	16th Feb 1859	Lochbroom
Acharacle	16th Mar 1859	Ardnamurchan
Cookney	16th Mar 1859	Fetteresso
Kirkcaldy: Pathhead	16th Mar 1859	Dysart
Persie	16th Mar 1859	Alyt, Bend, Blairg, Capu, Kirkm, Lethe, Rattr
Rothiemurchus	16th Mar 1859	Duthil
Stobhill	16th Mar 1859	Borthwick, Cockpen, Newbattle, Temple
Edinburgh: Newington	18th Mar 1859	St Cuthbert's
Strontian	8th Jun 1859	Ardnamurchan
Leith: Newhaven	20th Jul 1859	St Cuthbert's
Largoward	18th Jan 1860	Kilconquhar
Clova	14th Mar 1860	Cortachy
Hawick: St Mary's	14th Mar 1860	Hawick
Alloway	4th Jul 1860	Ayr, Maybole
Blairingone	18th Jul 1860	Fossoway
Duncansburgh	18th Jul 1860	Kilmallie
Gilmerton	18th Jul 1860	Liberton
Skelmorlie	18th Jul 1860	Inverkip, Largs
Strathkinness	18th Jul 1860	St Andrews
Wanlockhead	27th Jan 1861	
Portobello	17th Jul 1861	Duddingston
Pollokshaws	6th Jun 1862	Eastwood
Edinburgh: Lady Glenorchy's	2nd Jul 1862	
Maybole: West	2nd Jul 1862	Maybole, Kirkoswald
Ardallie	11th Jul 1862	Deer, Longside, Ellon, Cruden
Bargrennan	16th Jul 1862	Monigaff, Penninghame, Colmonell
Fisherton	16th Jul 1862	Maybole
Helensburgh	16th Jul 1862	Row
Kilmarnock: St Marnoch's	16th Jul 1862	Kilmarnock
Aberdeen: Woodside	17th Dec 1862	St Machar's
Elderslie	17th Dec 1862	Paisley Abbey
Corsock	1863	Balmaclellan, Parton, Kirkpatrick Durham
Belhaven	28th Jan 1863	Dunbar
Glengairn	28th Jan 1863	Glenmuick
Edinburgh: St Luke's (old)^{2}	11th Feb 1863	St George's
Glasgow: St Luke's	11th Feb 1863	Calton
Knoydart	20th May 1863	Glenelg
Brodick	15th Jul 1863	Kilbride
Broughty Ferry	15th Jul 1863	Dundee, Monifieth
Holytown	15th Jul 1863	Bothwell
Roslin	15th Jul 1863	Lasswade
Carnoustie	25th Nov 1863	Barry
Glasgow: St Mark's	25th Nov 1863	
Glasgow: Sandyford	1864	
Glasgow: The Park	1864	Kelvinhaugh
Carnoch	16th Mar 1864	Contin
Craigrownie	16th Mar 1864	Rosneath
Inverallochy	16th Mar 1864	Rathen
Kinlochluichart	16th Mar 1864	Contin, Fodderty, Urray
Dalbeattie	6th Jul 1864	Urr
Crieff: West	20th Jul 1864	Crieff
Edinburgh: Morningside	20th Jul 1864	St Cuthbert's
Tarbert	20th Jul 1864	Kilcalmonell, South Knapdale
Johnstone	1st Mar 1865	Paisley
Glenlivet	15th Mar 1865	Inveravon
Glenrinnes	15th Mar 1865	Mortlach, Aberlour
Arbroath: Ladyloan	19th Jul 1865	Arbroath, St Vigeans
Springfield	19th Jul 1865	Cupar
Perth: St Leonard's	20th Dec 1865	
Levern	17th Jan 1866	Paisley Abbey, Eastwood
Greenock: Cartsburn	19th Feb 1866	Greenock
Glasgow: St George's in the Fields	23rd May 1866	
Glasgow: Townhead	23rd May 1866	
Trossachs	6th Jun 1866	Callander, Aberfoyle, Port of Menteith
Alexandria	18th Jul 1866	Bonhill
Macduff	18th Jul 1866	Gamrie
Caddonfoot	1867	Galashiels, Innerleithen, Selkirk, Stow, Yarrow
Airdrie	13th Mar 1867	New Monkland
Glengarry	13th Mar 1867	Kilmonivaig, Boleskine, Glenelg
Oban	5th Jun 1867	Kilbride
Aberdeen: Holburn	19th Jun 1867	St Machar's
Burghead	19th Jun 1867	Duffus
Kilmarnock: St Andrew's	19th Jun 1867	Kilmarnock
Glasgow: Maxwell	6th Jul 1867	
Bannockburn	17th Jul 1867	St Ninians
Leadhills	17th Jul 1867	Crawford
Glasgow: Parkhead	20th Nov 1867	
New Byth	18th Dec 1867	King Edward, Aberdour
Kelso: North	1868	Kelso
Bridge of Allan	15th Jan 1868	Logie
Rutherglen: West	29th Jan 1868	Rutherglen
Lochgelly	12th Feb 1868	Auchterderran, Ballingry
Appin	15th May 1868	Lismore
Glasgow: Bellahouston	3rd Jun 1868	
Sheuchan	30th Jun 1868	Inch
Barrhead	15th Jul 1868	Neilston
North Yell	15th Jul 1868	Fetlar
Whalsay	15th Jul 1868	Nesting
Insh	18th Jan 1869	Kingussie
Glasgow: Partick	15th Feb 1869	
Glasgow: Milton	15th Mar 1869	
Inverallan	24th May 1869	Cromdale
Ythan Wells	24th May 1869	Forgue, Auchterless
Ord	5th Jul 1869	Banff, Alvah, Boyndie, Marnoch
Arbroath: Abbey	19th Jul 1869	Arbroath
Gartmore	19th Jul 1869	Port of Menteith, Drymen
Kirkcaldy: Invertiel	19th Jul 1869	Kinghorn, Abbotshall
Leith: St John's	19th Jul 1869	South Leith
Clarkston	Nov 1869	New Monkland, Shotts
Edinburgh: Dean	1870	St Cuthbert's
Garturk	1870	Old Monkland
Friockheim	28th Feb 1870	Kirkden
Kirriemuir: South	28th Feb 1870	Kirriemuir
Renton	28th Feb 1870	Cardross
Skipness	23rd May 1870	Saddell
Chryston	20th Jun 1870	Cadder
Quarff and Burra	24th Oct 1870	Bressay
Sandwick and Cunningsburgh	24th Oct 1870	Dunrossness
Glasgow: Bridgegate	27th Feb 1871	Glasgow St James's, Glasgow St Andrew's
Rothesay: New	13th Mar 1871	Rothesay
Glasgow: Hutchesontown	22nd May 1871	
Edinburgh: West Coates	5th Jun 1871	St Cuthbert's
Maxwelltown	17th Jun 1871	Troqueer
Portsoy	17th Jun 1871	Fordyce
Dundee: St Mark's	3rd Jul 1871	
Amulree	15th Jul 1871	Dull, Fowlis W, Kenm, Lt Dunk, Monz, Wm, Crief
Edinburgh: Robertson Memorial	30th Oct 1871	
Catrine	30th Oct 1871	Sorn
Rickarton	22nd Jan 1872	Fetteresso, Glenbervie
Greenock: North	18th Mar 1872	Greenock West
Dundee: Chapelshade	18th Mar 1872	Dundee St Mary's
Forfar: St James's	18th Mar 1872	Forfar
Kirkcaldy: St James's	24th Jun 1872	Kirkcaldy
Calderhead	8th Jul 1872	Shotts, Cambusnethan
Fauldhouse	8th Jul 1872	Whitburn
Arnsheen	28th Oct 1872	Colmonell
Baillieston	9th Dec 1872	Old Monkland
Edinburgh: Tolbooth Parish	1873^{1}	
Milngavie	3rd Mar 1873	New Kilpatrick
Dundee: St Andrew's	3rd Mar 1873	Dundee St Mary's
Dalreoch	17th Mar 1873	Cardross
Fortrose	17th Mar 1873	Rosemarkie
Glasgow: Bluevale	17th Mar 1873	Barony
Glasgow: Kelvinhaugh	17th Mar 1873	Barony
Glasgow: Macleod	17th Mar 1873	Barony
Garelochhead	17th Mar 1873	Row, Rosneath
Jamestown	17th Mar 1873	Bonhill
Greenknowe	2nd Apr 1873	Annan
Kirkintilloch: St David's	9th Jun 1873	Kirkintilloch
Lanark: St Leonard's	23rd Jun 1873	Lanark
Innellan	7th Jul 1873	Dunoon
Castle Douglas	1st Dec 1873	Crossmichael, Kelton
Kirn	12th Jan 1874	Dunoon
Glenprosen	12th Jan 1874	Kirriemuir
Galashiels: West	9th Feb 1874	Galashiels
Ayr: Wallacetown	9th Mar 1874	St Quivox
Coats	9th Mar 1874	Gartsherrie
Corgarff	9th Mar 1874	Strathdon, Tarland
Dundee: Wallacetown	9th Mar 1874	Dundee St Mary's
Glenapp	9th Mar 1874	Ballantrae
Hurlford	9th Mar 1874	Kilmarnock, Galston, Riccarton
Kininmonth	9th Mar 1874	Lonmay, Longside, Deer, Strichen, Crimond
Paisley: North	9th Mar 1874	Paisley Middle
Rosewell	22nd Jun 1874	Lasswade
Ardentinny	6th Jul 1874	Dunoon, Kilmun, Lochgoilhead
Brechin: East	6th Jul 1874	Brechin
Edinburgh: St David's	6th Jul 1874	St Cuthbert's
Paisley: Martyrs'	6th Jul 1874	Paisley Abbey, Paisley High Kirk
Paisley: St Columba's Gaelic	6th Jul 1874	Paisley High Kirk
Fullarton	23rd Nov 1874	Dundonald
Uddingston	7th Dec 1874	Bothwell
Haggs	18th Jan 1875	Denny
Dundee: Rosebank	18th Jan 1875	Dundee St Mary's
Glasgow: Blythswood^{3}	19th Jan 1875	
Glasgow: Plantation	1st Feb 1875	
Glasgow: Anderston	15th Feb 1875	Govan
Heylipol	15th Feb 1875	Kirkapol
Newport	15th Feb 1875	
Ardrishaig	1st Mar 1875	Lochgilphead, South Knapdale
Glasgow: Queen's Park	1st Mar 1875	Cathcart, Govan
Wemyss: West	1st Mar 1875	Wemyss
Glasgow: Kingston	6th Mar 1875	
Glasgow: Whiteinch	6th Mar 1875	Govan
Glasgow: Partick St Mary's	15th Mar 1875	Partick
St Mary's (South Ronaldsay)	24th May 1875	St Peter's (South Ronaldsay)
Girvan: South	19th Jul 1875	Girvan
Broughty Ferry: St Stephen's	19th Jul 1875	Broughty Ferry, Monifieth
Greenock: South	19th Jul 1875	Greenock West
Langbank	22nd Nov 1875	Erskine
Colliston	6th Dec 1875	St Vigeans
Flowerhill	6th Dec 1875	Airdrie
Grahamston	6th Dec 1875	Falkirk
Edinburgh: Abbey	Jan 1876	Greenside, South Leith
Barthol Chapel	17th Jan 1876	Tarves, Fyvie, Methlick, Meldrum
Chapelton	17th Jan 1876	Glasford, Hamilton, East Kilbride
Glasgow: Port Dundas^{5}	21st Feb 1876	Barony
Milton of Balgonie	21st Feb 1876	Markinch
Buchlyvie	6th Mar 1876	Kippen, Drymen
Clydebank: St James's	6th Mar 1876	Old Kilpatrick, Renfrew
Methil	6th Mar 1876	Wemyss, Markinch
Bargeddie	13th Mar 1876	Old Monkland
Dundee: St Enoch's	13th Mar 1876	
Dundee: St Luke's	13th Mar 1876	Liff
Glasgow: Dean Park	5th Jun 1876	Govan, Maxwell
Glasgow: Kinning Park	5th Jun 1876	Govan
Lenzie	5th Jun 1876	Kirkintilloch, Cadder
Fairlie	19th Jun 1876	Largs, West Kilbride
Glasgow: St Bernard's	19th Jun 1876	
Glasgow: Martyrs'	3rd Jul 1876	Townhead
Glasgow: Greenhead	5th Jul 1876	Calton
Buckie	17th Jul 1876	Rathven
Birsay	17th Jul 1876	Harray
Overtown	17th Jul 1876	Wishaw
Torphins	31st Jul 1876	Kincardine O'Neil
Glasgow: Robertson Memorial	6th Dec 1876	St Mungo's, St Paul's
Sandbank	11th Dec 1876	Dunoon, Kilmun
Stanley	22nd Jan 1877	Auchtergaven, Kinclaven, Redgorton
Glasgow: Newlands	5th Feb 1877	Calton
Glasgow: Wellpark^{6}	5th Mar 1877	Glasgow Blackfriars, St Mungo's
Aberdeen: Rubislaw	19th Mar 1877	Aberdeen St Nicholas
Aberdeen: Trinity	19th Mar 1877	Aberdeen St Nicholas
Fraserburgh: West	19th Mar 1877	Fraserburgh
Peterhead: East	19th Mar 1877	Peterhead
Newmill	18th Jun 1877	Keith
Glasgow: Abbotsford	22nd Jun 1877	
Patna	2nd Jul 1877	Dalmellington, Dalrymple, Kirkmichael, Straiton
Dundee: Logie	16th Jul 1877	Liff, Benvie, Invergowrie
Norrieston	16th Jul 1877	Port of Menteith, Kincardine in Menteith, Kilmadock
Sauchie	16th Jul 1877	Clackmannan, Alloa
Marykirk	18th Feb 1878	Stirling
Paisley: South	18th Feb 1878	Paisley Abbey, Paisley Laigh Kirk
Thornton	18th Feb 1878	Markinch, Dysart, Kinglassie
Bonnybridge	14th Mar 1878	Denny, Dunipace, Camelon
Bellshill	18th Mar 1878	Bothwell
Harthill and Benhar	18th Mar 1878	Shotts
Pulteneytown	18th Mar 1878	Wick
Stoer	18th Mar 1878	Assynt
Troon	18th Mar 1878	Dundonald
Glasgow: Newhall	3rd Jun 1878	
Glasgow: Pollokshields	4th Nov 1878	Govan
Blackhill	13th Jan 1879	Peterhead, Longside, Cruden
Cadzow	13th Jan 1879	Hamilton
Glasgow: Strathbungo	13th Jan 1879	Govan, Queen's Park
Mossgreen	13th Jan 1879	Aberdour, Dalgety, Dunfermline, Inverkeithing
Braemar	17th Mar 1879	Crathie
Glasgow: Barrowfield	17th Mar 1879	Calton
Hillside	17th Mar 1879	Montrose
Coltness Memorial or Newmains	17th Mar 1879	Cambusnethan
Plean	17th Mar 1879	St Ninians
Aberdeen: Ferryhill	14th Jul 1879	Holburn
Aberdeen: Rosemount	14th Jul 1879	St Machar's
Blairgowrie: St Mary's	14th Jul 1879	Blairgowrie
Kilry	14th Jul 1879	Glenisla, Lintrathen, Alyth
Glasgow: St Vincent's	24th Nov 1879	Barony
Linwood	19th Jan 1880	Paisley Abbey, Kilbarchan
Aberdeen: John Knox	15th Mar 1880	Greyfriars, St Nicholas, St Machar's
Aberdeen: St George's	15th Mar 1880	Aberdeen St Nicholas
Dalziel: South	15th Mar 1880	Dalziel
Freuchie	15th Mar 1880	Falkland
Dundee: Lochee	7th Jun 1880	St Mary's Dundee, Liff
Grangemouth	7th Jun 1880	Falkirk
Oban: St Columba's	19th Jul 1880	Oban, Kilbride
South Yell	19th Jul 1880	Mid Yell
Banton	6th Dec 1880	Kilsyth
Greenock: Wellpark	21st Feb 1881	Greenock West
Boddam	14th Mar 1881	Peterhead, Cruden
Forth	14th Mar 1881	Carnwath
Hawick: St John's	17th May 1881	Hawick, Hawick St Mary's
Glasgow: St Thomas's	18th Jul 1881	Glasgow St John's
Burnbank	27th Feb 1882	Hamilton
Strathfillan	27th Feb 1882	Killin
Tighnabruaich	10th Mar 1882	Kilfinan
Aberdeen: Mannofield	13th Mar 1882	Holburn, Banchory-Devenick
Crosshouse	13th Mar 1882	Kilmaurs, Dreghorn
Edinburgh: Old Kirk Parish^{1}	13th Mar 1882	
Glasgow: Hillhead	13th Mar 1882	Govan
Greenock: Ladyburn	5th Jun 1882	Greenock East
Ladybank	5th Jun 1882	Collessie
Flotta	17th Jul 1882	Walls (Orkney)
Eday	11th Nov 1882	Stronsay
Cleland	11th Dec 1882	Shotts, Bothwell
Duntocher	11th Dec 1882	Old Kilpatrick
Glenbuck	11th Dec 1882	Muirkirk
Kirtle	26th Feb 1883	Middlebie
Fort Augustus	12th Mar 1883	Boleskine
Grantully	12th Mar 1883	Little Dunkeld, Dull
Cellardyke	28th Mar 1883	Kilrenny
Walkerburn	2nd Jul 1883	Innerleithen, Traquair
Condorrat	29th Oct 1883	Cumbernauld, Kirkintilloch, Chryston
Helensburgh: West	29th Oct 1883	Row, Helensburgh
Edinburgh: St Leonard's	1884	
Loanhead	1884	Lasswade, Pentland
Kirkcaldy: Raith	25th Feb 1884	Abbotshall
Erchless	17th Mar 1884	Kiltarlity, Kilmorack, Kintail
Strone	17th Mar 1884	Dunoon, Kilmun
Glasgow: St Kiaran's	26th May 1884	Govan, Dean Park
Kirkfieldbank	26th May 1884	Lesmahagow
Edinburgh: St Margaret's	1885	St Cuthbert's
Glasgow: St Enoch's Hogganfield	12th Jan 1885	Springburn, Barony, Shettleston, Calder, Chryston
Dundee: Clepington	12th Jan 1885	Dundee St Mary's
Dundee: St Matthew's	12th Jan 1885	
Selkirk: Heatherlie	12th Jan 1885	Selkirk
Braes of Rannoch	16th Mar 1885	Kinloch Rannoch, Fortingall
Cockenzie	16th Mar 1885	Tranent
Gardenstown	16th Mar 1885	Gamrie
Law	16th Mar 1885	Carluke
Seafield or Portknockie	16th Mar 1885	Cullen
Ardler	1st Jun 1885	Coupar Angus
Calderbank	13th Jul 1885	Old Monkland
Dinnet	14th Mar 1886	Aboyne, Logie Coldstone, Glenmuick
Arbroath: St Margaret's	15th Mar 1886	Abroath, Inverbrothock, St Vigeans
Armadale	15th Mar 1886	Bathgate
Auchmithie	15th Mar 1886	St Vigeans
Craigiebuckler	15th Mar 1886	St Machar's, Banch Dev, Petercu, Newhills, Rubislaw
Dalmarnock	15th Mar 1886	Calton
Fergushill	15th Mar 1886	Kilwinning, Irvine, Stewarton
Newcraighall	15th Mar 1886	Inveresk
Knoxland	24th May 1886	Dumbarton
Bridge of Weir	14th Mar 1887	Kilbarchan, Houston
Edinburgh: St Aidan's	14th Mar 1887	St Cuthbert's
Edinburgh: St Michael's	14th Mar 1887	St Cuthbert's
Lybster	14th Mar 1887	Latheron
Glasgow: Kelvinside	30th Jan 1888	Maryhill
Edinburgh: Mayfield	12th Mar 1888	Liberton
Glasgow: St Clement's	12th Mar 1888	Calton
Advie	16th Jul 1888	Cromdale
Granton	Jan 1889	Cramond, Dean, St Bernard's
Greenbank	25th Feb 1889	Cathcart, Eastwood, Mearns
Glasgow: St Ninian's	11th Mar 1889	Govan
Maud	15th Jul 1889	Deer, New Deer
Perth: St Andrew's	15th Jul 1889	Perth East
Stonefield	24th Feb 1890	Blantyre
Blackbraes	14th Jul 1890	Muiravonside
Cardonald	14th Jul 1890	Paisley Abbey, Govan
Glencoe	14th Jul 1890	Lismore
Glenmoriston	9th Mar 1891	Urquhart
Wardlawhill	9th Mar 1891	Rutherglen
Caldwell	10th Mar 1891	Neilston, Beith
Edinburgh: St James's	6th Jul 1891	St Cuthbert's
Glasgow: Oatlands	6th Jul 1891	Govan
Prinlaws	16th Nov 1891	Leslie
Ayr: St Leonard's	7th Mar 1892	Ayr
Darvel	7th Mar 1892	Loudoun, Galston
Glasgow: Possilpark	7th Mar 1892	Maryhill
Thornliebank	7th Mar 1892	Eastwood
Glasgow: Elder Park	11th Jul 1892	
Douglas Water	28th Nov 1892	Carmichael, Douglas, Lesmahagow
Addiewell	23rd Jan 1893	West Calder
Leith: St Paul's	23rd Jan 1893	
Glasgow: Govanhill	14th Jul 1893	Govan, Queen's Park
Ardgour	23rd Feb 1894	Ballachulish
Caldercruix	23rd Feb 1894	Shotts, New Monkland, Clarkston
Burray	4th Mar 1894	St Peter's (South Ronaldsay)
Rendall	15th Mar 1894	Evie
Kilmun	16th Mar 1894	Dunoon
Greengairs	13th Jul 1894	New Monkland
Southwick	13th Jul 1894	Colvend
Blairdaff	15th Mar 1895	Chapel of Garioch, Monymusk, Oyne
Dundurn	15th Mar 1895	Comrie, Tullichetil
Benbecula	31st May 1895	South Uist
Cults	13th Mar 1896	Banchory Devenick, Peterculter, Craigiebuckler
Paisley: Greenlaw	13th Mar 1896	Paisley
Stoneywood	13th Mar 1896	Newhills
Temple	13th Mar 1896	New Kilpatrick, Govan, Renfrew
Hawick: St Margaret's	29th May 1896	Wilton
Dalry: West	30th Oct 1896	Dalry, Kilwinning, Ardrossan
Plockton	19th Feb 1897	Lochalsh
Shieldaig	19th Feb 1897	Applecross, Lochcarron
Aberfeldy	19th Mar 1897	Logierait, Dull
Greenock: Augustine	19th Mar 1897	Greenock Cartsburn
Kenmuir	19th Mar 1897	Old Monkland
Haywood	28th May 1897	Carnwath
Menstrie	16th Jul 1897	Logie
Craiglockhart	10th Dec 1897	St Cuthbert's, Colinton
Brechin: Gardner Memorial	18th Nov 1898	Brechin
Whiteness and Weisdale	15th Mar 1899	Tingwall
Glasgow: Cowlairs	25th May 1899	Springburn, Maryhill
Cambuslang: West	11th Jan 1901	Cambuslang
Shawlands	18th Mar 1901	Eastwood
Quarter	12th Jul 1901	Hamilton
Johnstone: St Andrew's	1st Nov 1901	Johnstone, Kilbarchan, Elderslie
Glasgow: Langside	8th Nov 1901	Cathcart
Glasgow: Titwood	8th Nov 1901	Govan
Hallside	15th Nov 1901	Cambuslang
Greenock: St Paul's	29th Nov 1901	Greenock West
Perth: St Stephen's	13th Dec 1901	Perth St John's, Perth St Leonard's, Tibbermore
Craigmore	21st Feb 1902	Rothesay, Kingarth
Ardwell	7th Mar 1902	Stoneykirk
Shurrery	7th Mar 1902	Reay, Halkirk, Thurso
Aberdeen: Ruthrieston	28th Nov 1902	Holburn, Ferryhill
Glasgow: Govan St Bride's	12th Dec 1902	Govan
Glasgow: St Margaret's	12th Dec 1902	Govan, Oatlands
Boarhills	20th Mar 1903	St Andrews, St Leonards
Broxburn	20th Mar 1903	Uphall
Finzean	20th Mar 1903	Birse
Aberdeen: St Ninian's	10th Jul 1903	Rosemount, Rubislaw
Gullane	30th Oct 1903	Dirleton
Aberdeen: Powis	8th Jan 1904	St Machar's, Rosemount, Woodside
Dundee: Maryfield	5th Feb 1904	Dundee St Mary's
Winchburgh	27th May 1904	Kirkliston, Dalmeny
Ayr: St James's	15th Jul 1904	Newton-upon-Ayr
Howwood	15th Jul 1904	Lochwinnoch, Kilbarchan
Stenhouse	2nd Dec 1904	Larbert
Coatdyke	7th Jul 1905	Airdrie, Coats
Meadowfield	3rd Nov 1905	New Monkland, Clarkston
Yoker	8th Jun 1906	Renfrew, Clydebank
Dundyvan	13th Jul 1906	Old Monkland
Kerse	13th Jul 1906	Falkirk
Stepps	15th Jul 1906	Hogganfield, Chryston
Glasgow: Belmont	2nd Nov 1906	Hillhead
Juniper Green	30th Nov 1906	Colinton
Saltcoats: North	14th Dec 1906	Ardrossan, Stewarton
Barnhill: St Margaret's	8th Mar 1907	Monifieth
Edinburgh: St Oswald's	8th Mar 1907	St Cuthbert's
Lugar	8th Mar 1907	Auchinleck
Broughty Ferry: Beach	19th Jul 1907	Broughty Ferry
Dundee: Fairmuir	20th Dec 1907	Dundee St Mary's, Mains and Strathmartine
Dunfermline: St Leonard's	24th Jan 1908	
Whiting Bay	19th Mar 1908	Kilbride, Kilmorie
Edinburgh: Prestonfield	30th Oct 1908	Liberton, Duddingston, Mayfield
Edinburgh: St Luke's (new)	6th Feb 1909	Dean, St Bernard's
Prestwick: St Nicholas'	19th Mar 1909	Monkton
Edinburgh: St Matthew's	9th Jul 1909	Morningside
Dalmuir	12th Nov 1909	Old Kilpatrick
Dalziel: St Andrew's	3rd Dec 1909	Dalziel
Connel	18th Mar 1910	Oban St Columba's, Muckairn, Kilbride
Saughtree	1st Jul 1910	Castleton
Glasgow: Hyndland	15th Jul 1910	Govan
Glasgow: St Cuthbert's	23rd Dec 1910	Kelvinside, Maryhill, St George's in the Fields
Wormit	9th Mar 1911	Forgan
Elchies	9th Feb 1912	Knockando
Kirkcaldy: Sinclairtown	9th Feb 1912	Dysart
Dundee: Downfield	23rd Feb 1912	Mains and Strathmartine
Edinburgh: Restalrig	31st May 1912	South Leith
Glasgow: Battlefield	19th Jun 1912	Cathcart
Edinburgh: Tynecastle	5th Jul 1912	St Cuthbert's
Edinburgh: St Serf's	1st Nov 1912	St Cuthbert's, St Bernard's, Newhaven
Alloa: St Andrew's	7th Feb 1913	Alloa
Dundee: Balgay	7th Mar 1913	Dundee St Mary's, Liff
Craigneuk	7th Mar 1913	South Dalziel
Buckhaven	6th Jun 1913	Wemyss, Methil, Milton of Balgonie
Edinburgh: Murrayfield	6th Jun 1913	West Coates, Craiglockhart
Kilbowie	6th Jun 1913	Old Kilpatrick
Boquhanran	12th Dec 1913	Old Kilpatrick, Clydebank
Glasgow: Carntyne St Michael's	14th Jan 1914	Shettleston
Forfar: Lowson Memorial	29th May 1914	Forfar
Murthly	12th Jun 1914	Little Dunkeld
Annbank	10th Jul 1914	St Quivox, Tarbolton
Falkirk: Laurieston	10th Jul 1914	Falkirk
Glasgow: Colston	30th Jan 1915	Maryhill
Glasgow: St Kenneth's	28th May 1915	Govan
Scotstoun	28th May 1915	Yoker
Cowdenbeath	9th Jul 1915	Beath, Auchtertool
Inverness: St Stephen's	9th Jul 1915	Inverness
Corstorphine: St Anne's^{4}	5th Nov 1915	Corstorphine
Aberdeen: St Fittick's	17th Dec 1915	Nigg
Invergowrie	28th Jan 1916	Liff, Benvie
Glasgow: Buccleuch	10th Mar 1916	
Kirkcaldy: St John's	3rd Nov 1916	Kirkcaldy
Glasgow: Wilton	16th Mar 1917	Kelvinside
Glasgow: Merrylea	15th Mar 1918	Cathcart
Glasgow: Pollokshields St Gilbert's	28th Jun 1918	
Lochranza	28th Jun 1918	Kilmorie
Dalziel: St Mary's	15th Nov 1918	Dalziel
Giffnock	10th Jan 1919	Eastwood, Mearns, Thornliebank
Arisaig	18th Jul 1919	Ardnamurchan
Glasgow: Bellahouston Steven Mem.	18th Jul 1919	Bellahouston, Govan
Glasgow: Balshagray	14th Nov 1919	Govan, Whiteinch
Glasgow: Dennistoun	19th Mar 1920	Springburn
Tollcross: St Margaret's	25th Jun 1920	Shettleston
Glasgow: Woodside St Oswald's	1921	
Perth: St John's	27th Oct 1921	Perth East, Middle, West (all suppressed)
Perth: St Mark's	27th Oct 1921	Perth East, Middle, West (all suppressed)
Twechar	Jan 1922	Kirkintilloch
Blackhall St Columba's^{4}	7th Jul 1922	
Paisley: Mosspark	1923	
Drumchapel	1923	
Edinburgh: St Bride's^{4}	16th Mar 1923	
St Modan's	16th Mar 1923	
Edinburgh: St Mungo's/Lockhart Mem.^{4}	20th Jul 1923	
Kelty	1925	Beath
Knightswood St Margaret's	1925	Temple, Drumchapel

^{1}having been abolished 23rd Jul 1860 ^{2}abolished 1909 ^{3}united to St Matthew's in 1920 ^{4}found only in Vol. VIII of the Fasti, not Vols. I-VII ^{5}united to Milton in 1916 ^{6}divided between Blackfriars and St Mungo in 1915
