= Peter MacGregor Chalmers =

Scottish architect

Peter MacGregor Chalmers LLD (14 March 1859 – 15 March 1922) was a Scottish architect specialising in country churches, and also being involved in several important restoration schemes.

== Life ==
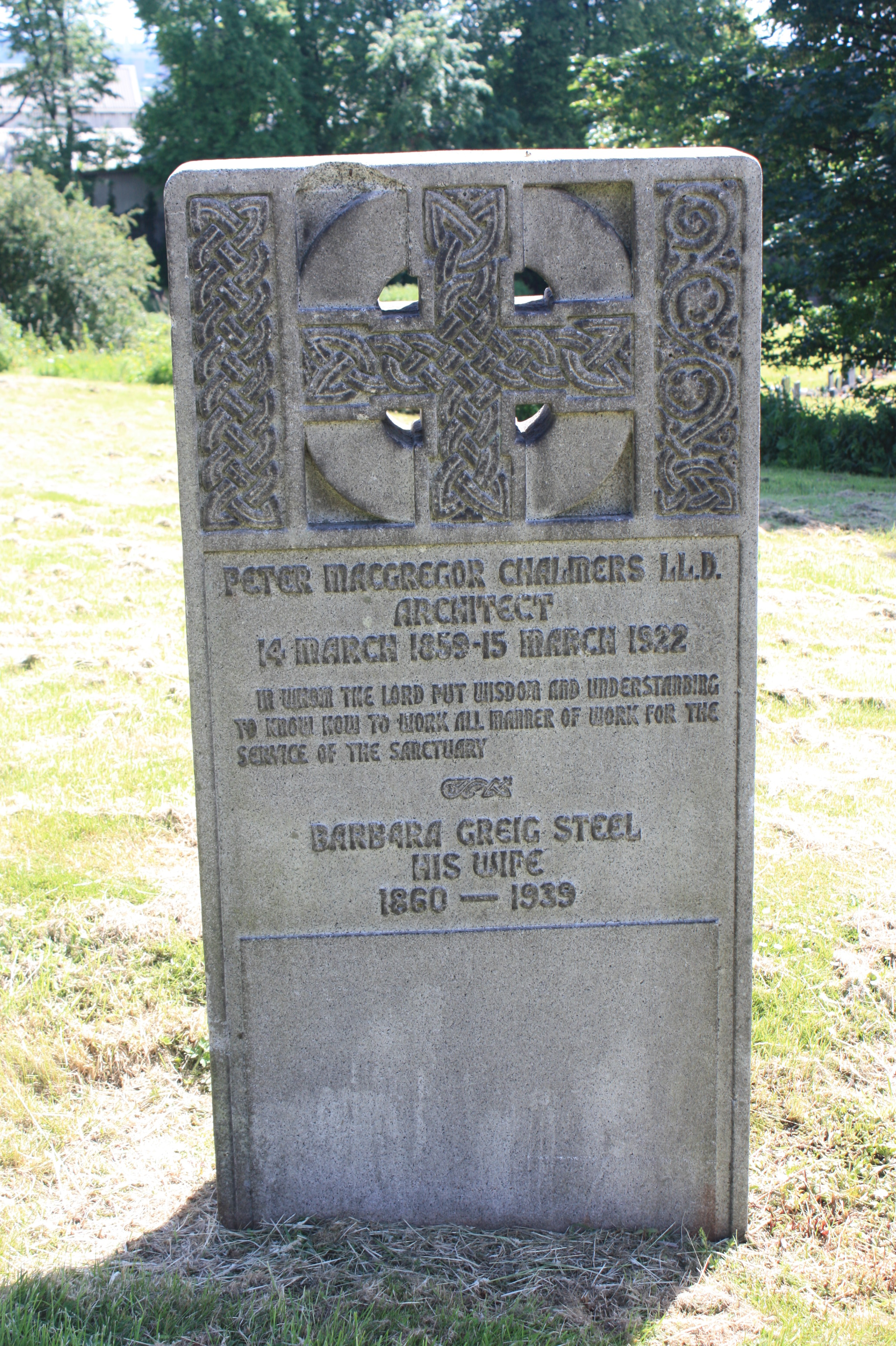
The grave of Peter MacGregor Chalmers, Glasgow Necropolis

Chalmers was born on 14 March 1859, the son of George, a mechanical engineer, and his wife, Jane (née MacGregor). He was educated at Glasgow Secular School, then articled to the architect John Honeyman. He set up in private practice from 1887.

From around 1900 many of his churches adopt a very distinctive circular tower.

In 1904 he was living at 6 Minard Road (now Turnberry Road) in Glasgow. The property is a substantial four-bedroom tenement flat, in Glasgow's west end. His offices were in a more prestigious property at 95 Bath Street. He travelled very widely, and Glasgow University awarded him an honorary doctorate (LLD) in 1920 for his writings.

He died of a heart attack while visiting his cousin, Rev. R. H. Fisher, in Edinburgh on 15 March 1922. He is buried in the lower southern section of the Glasgow Necropolis alongside the north-east path that leads to the main, upper section.

== Family ==
In 1905 he was married to Barbara Greig Steel (1860–1939) of Partick.

== Principal works ==
- Cardonald Parish Church (1887)
- Alterations to Jedburgh Parish Church (1891)
- Alterations to Crailing Parish Church (1892)
- Restoration of Abercorn Parish Church (1893)
- Investigation and archaeological survey at Jedburgh Abbey (1894)
- St Margaret's, Newlands, Glasgow (1895)
- Five tenements on Crow Road (1896)
- Kilchoman Parish Church (1897)
- Morvern Parish Church (1897)
- St Bride's Church, Partick (1897)
- St Kiaran's Church, Port Charlotte, Islay (1897)
- St Margaret's Church, Polmadie
- St Mark's Church, Morningside, Edinburgh (1897)
- St Kenneth's Church, Govan (1897)
- Consolidation and restoration of Glenluce Abbey (1898)
- Keil Church, Lochaline (1898)
- Kelvinside Laundry (1898)
- Restoration of South Queensferry Parish Church (1898)
- St Ninian's Chapel, Whithorn (1898)
- Stepps Established Church (1898)
- Carnoustie Parish Church (1899)
- Restoration of St Monans Parish Church (1899)
- Ardwell Parish Church (1900)
- Restoration of Inverkeithing Parish Church (1900)
- Restoration of Kilmun Parish Church (1900)
- Remodelling of Kirk Yetholm Church (1900)
- Public House, 6–8 Sinclair Street, Helensburgh (1901)
- Rebuilding of Scoonie Parish Church (1901)
- St Leonards Church, St Andrews (1902)
- St Columba's Church, Blackhall, Edinburgh (1902)
- St Leonard's Church, Dunfermline (1904)
- Kilmore Church, Dervaig (1904)
- Skelmorlie Church (1903)
- St Ninian's, Prestwick (1904)
- St Serf's, Tullibody (1904)
- Restoration of Culross Abbey Church (1905)
- Hoselaw Chapel, Linton, Scottish Borders (1905)
- Restoration of church, Saline, Fife (1905)
- St Columba's Church, Elgin, Moray (1905)
- Repairs to Melrose Abbey (1905)
- Dennistoun Established Church (1906)
- Neptune Buildings, 470 Argyle Street Glasgow (1906)
- St Cuthbert's Church, Saltcoats (1906)
- Kirn & Sandbank Parish Church, Kirn (1907)
- Restoration of parish church, Bowden, Scottish Borders (1907)
- Hexagonal vestry, Rafford (1907)
- St Luke's Church, Stockbridge, Edinburgh (1907)
- Remodelling of St Columba's Church, Strone (1907)
- Braes of Rannoch Church (1907)
- Carriden Parish Church (1907)
- Remodelling of Iona Abbey (1908)
- Colvend Parish Church (1909)
- Remodelling of Sprouston Parish Church (1911)
- St Anne's Church, Corstorphine, Edinburgh (1911)
- St Kiaran's Church Achnacarry (1911)
- New roof, Caddonfoot Kirk (1911)
- Holy Trinity Church, Merrylee (1912)
- Church on the isle of Canna (1912)
- Restoration of Duthil Parish Church (1912/13)
- Restoration of Paisley Abbey (1912 to 1922) completed by Sir Robert Lorimer
- Tarbrax Church (1913)
- St Modan's Church, Falkirk (1914)
- Urr Parish Church (1914)
- Merrylea Parish Church, Glasgow (1915)
- Remodelling of St Andrew's Church, Lochgelly (1915)
- Works at Dunfermline Abbey to give permanence to then recent archaeological excavations (1916)
- Restoration of Iona Nunnery (1916 to 1923)
- Restoration of Dalmeny Church (1919)
- Restoration of church, Symington, South Ayrshire (1919)
- Remodelling of Tillicoultry Parish Church (1921)

== War memorials ==
Chalmers designed several war memorials from 1919, these include: Cambuslang Parish Church; Morebattle Parish Church; Burntisland Parish Church; Kelvinside Free Church; Memorial Chapel in St Cuthbert's Church, Edinburgh; West Linton Parish Church; Abbey Parish Church in Kilwinning; Barony Church, Glasgow; Memorial arch in Dyke, Moray; Rosneath Church; St Salvator's College, St Andrews; Crieff; Memorial window Uphall.

== Gallery ==
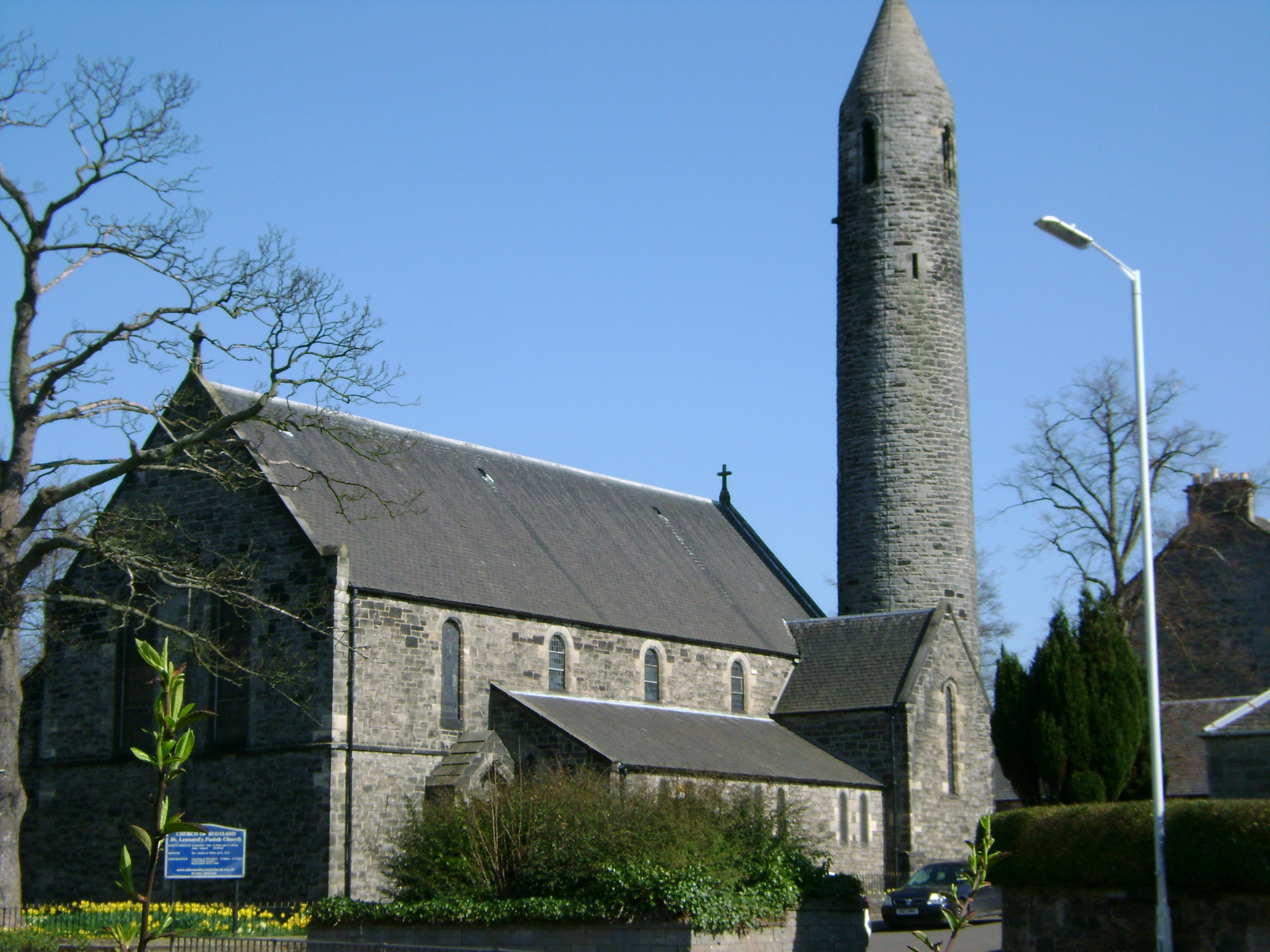
St Leonard's Church, Dunfermline (1903)

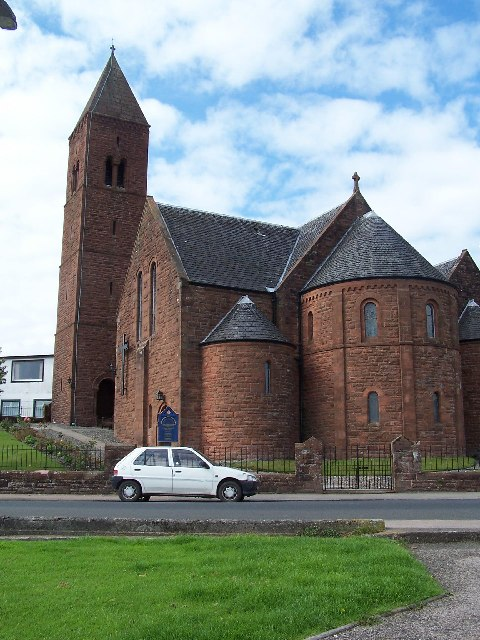
Kirn & Sandbank Parish Church

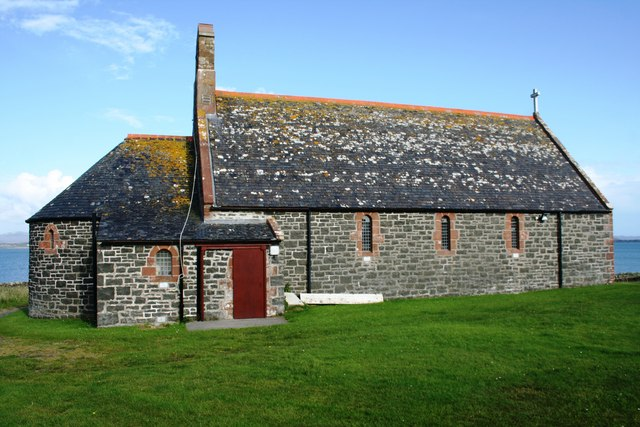
Kilchoman Parish Church

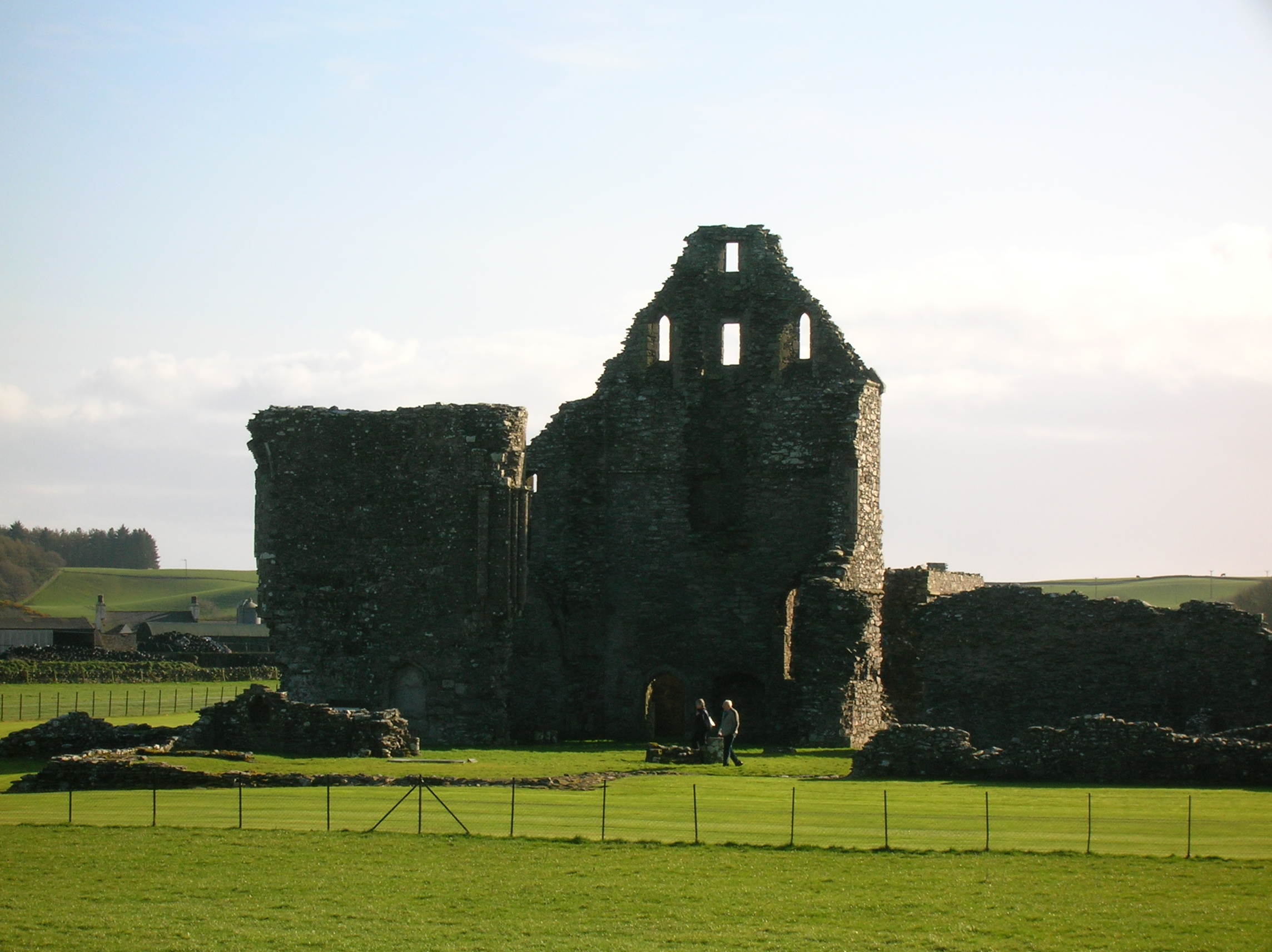
Glenluce Abbey ruins.

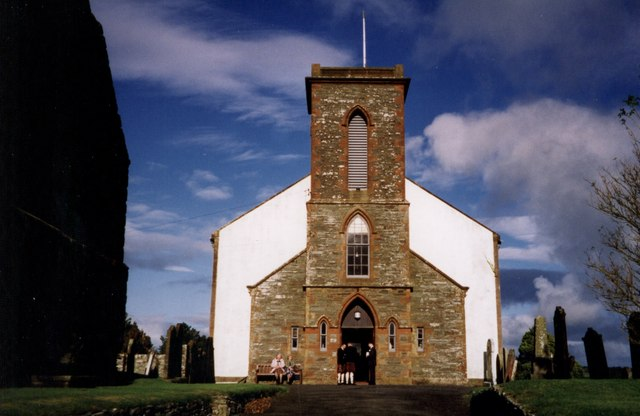
St Ninian's Priory Chapel, Whithorn

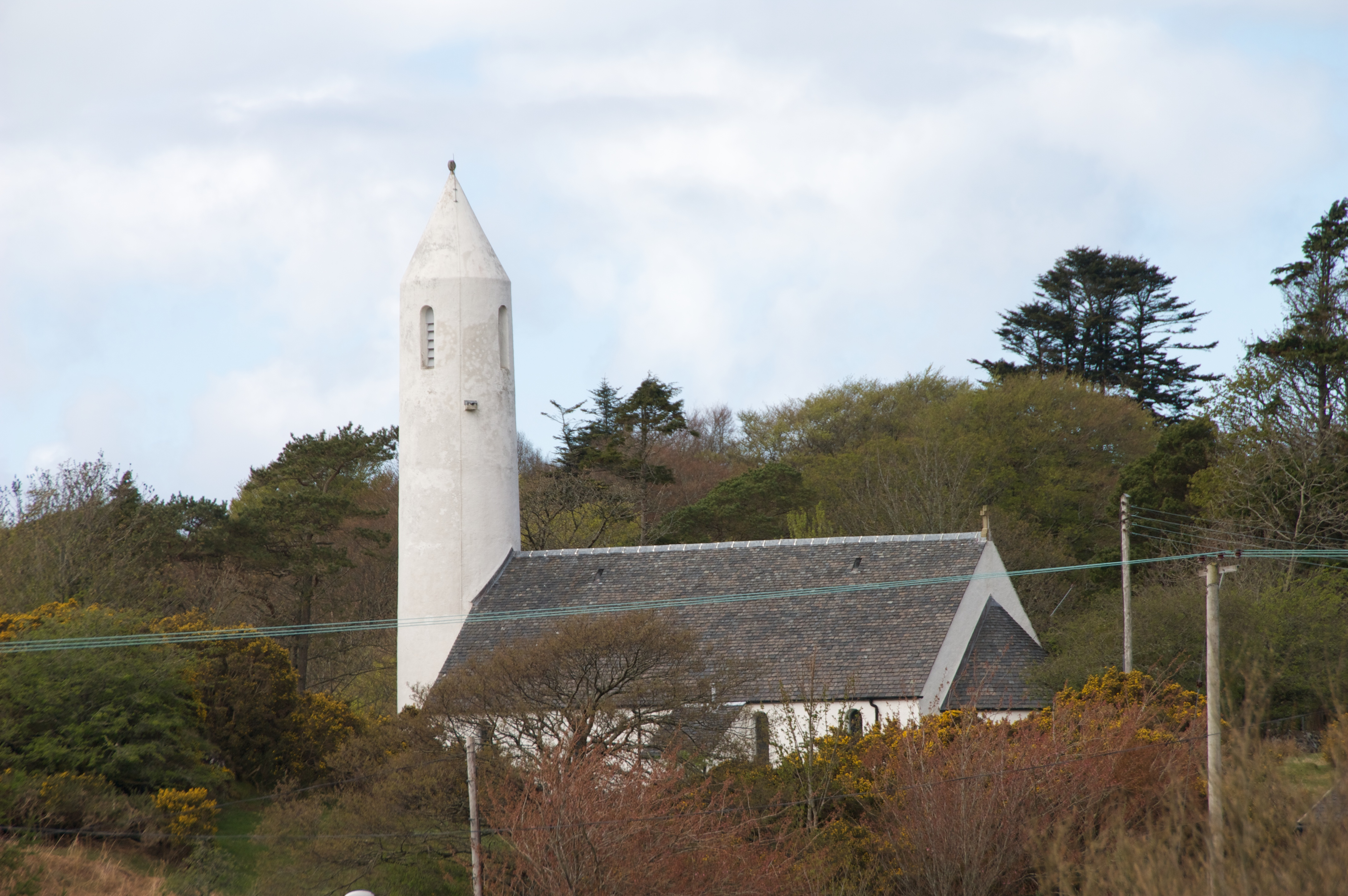
Kimore Church at Dervaig

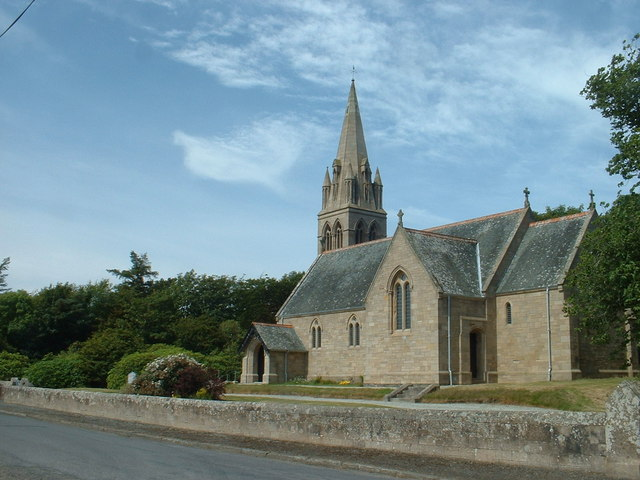
Ardwell Church

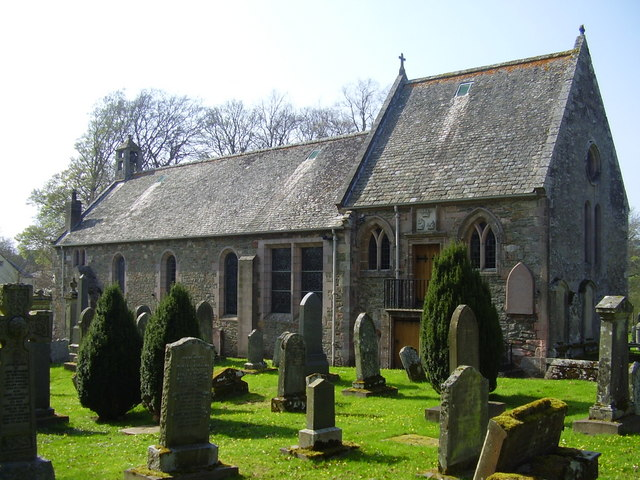
Bowden Church

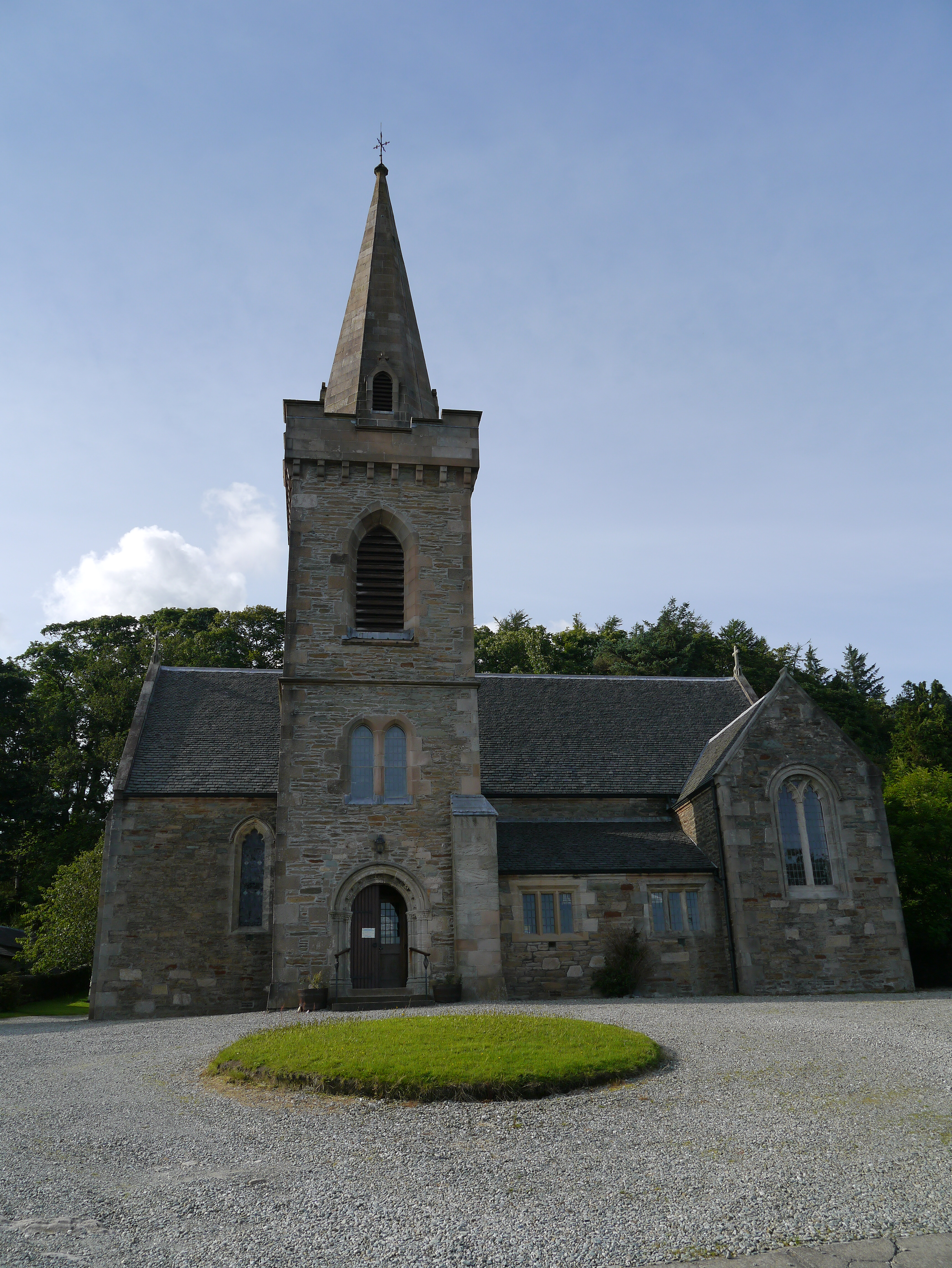
St Columba's Church, Strone

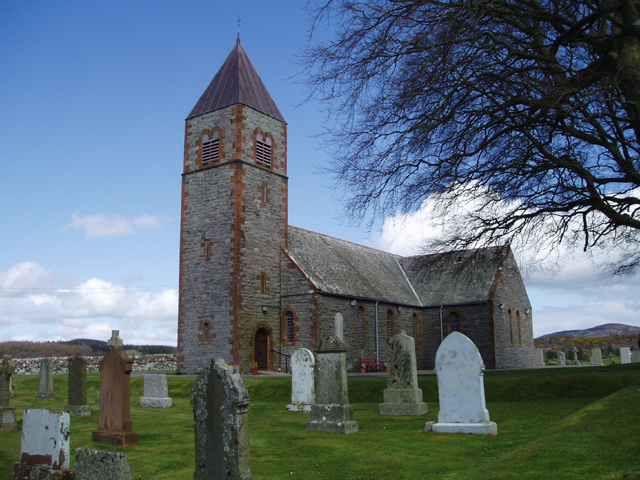
Colvend Parish Church

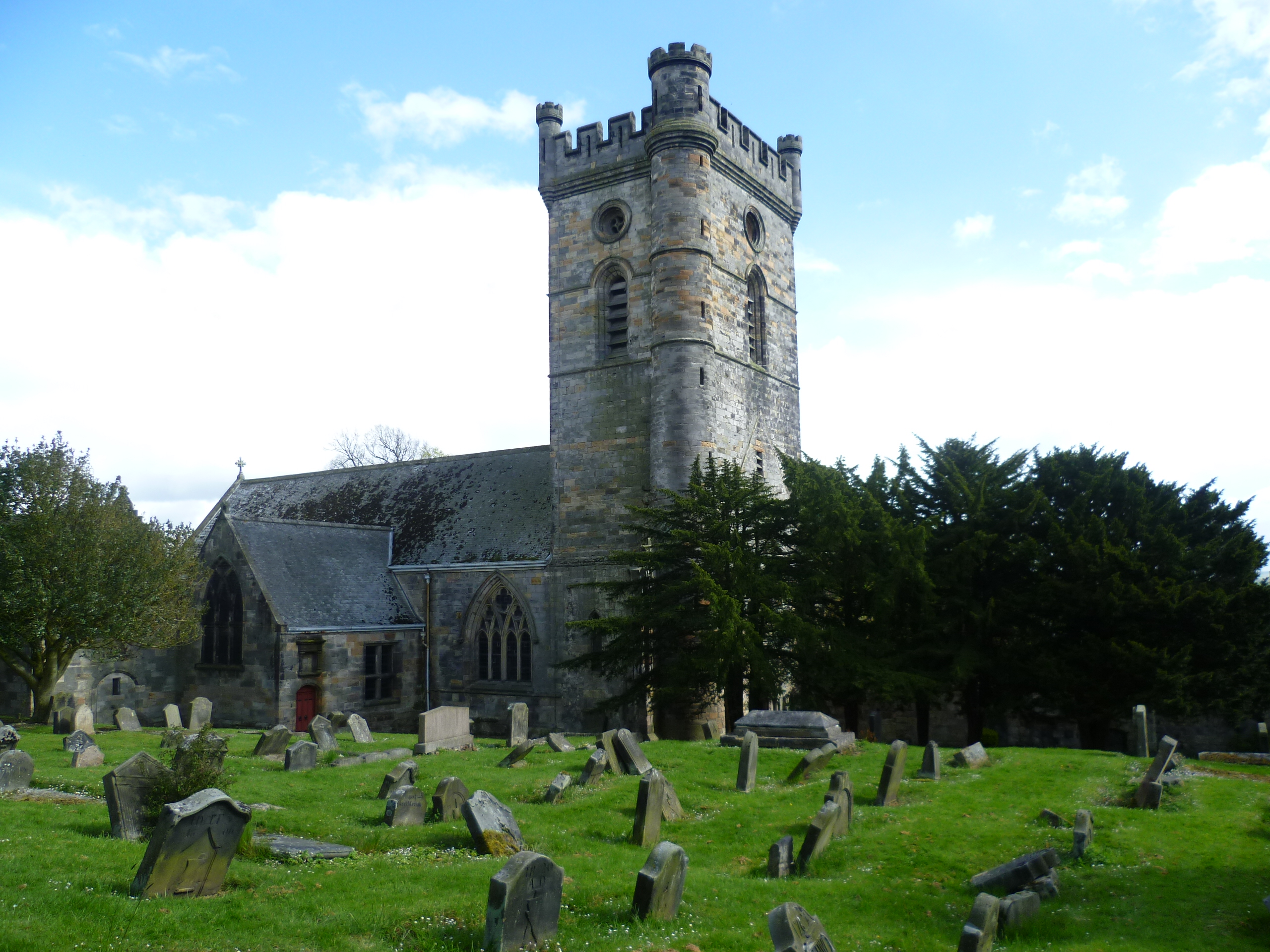
Culross Abbey Church

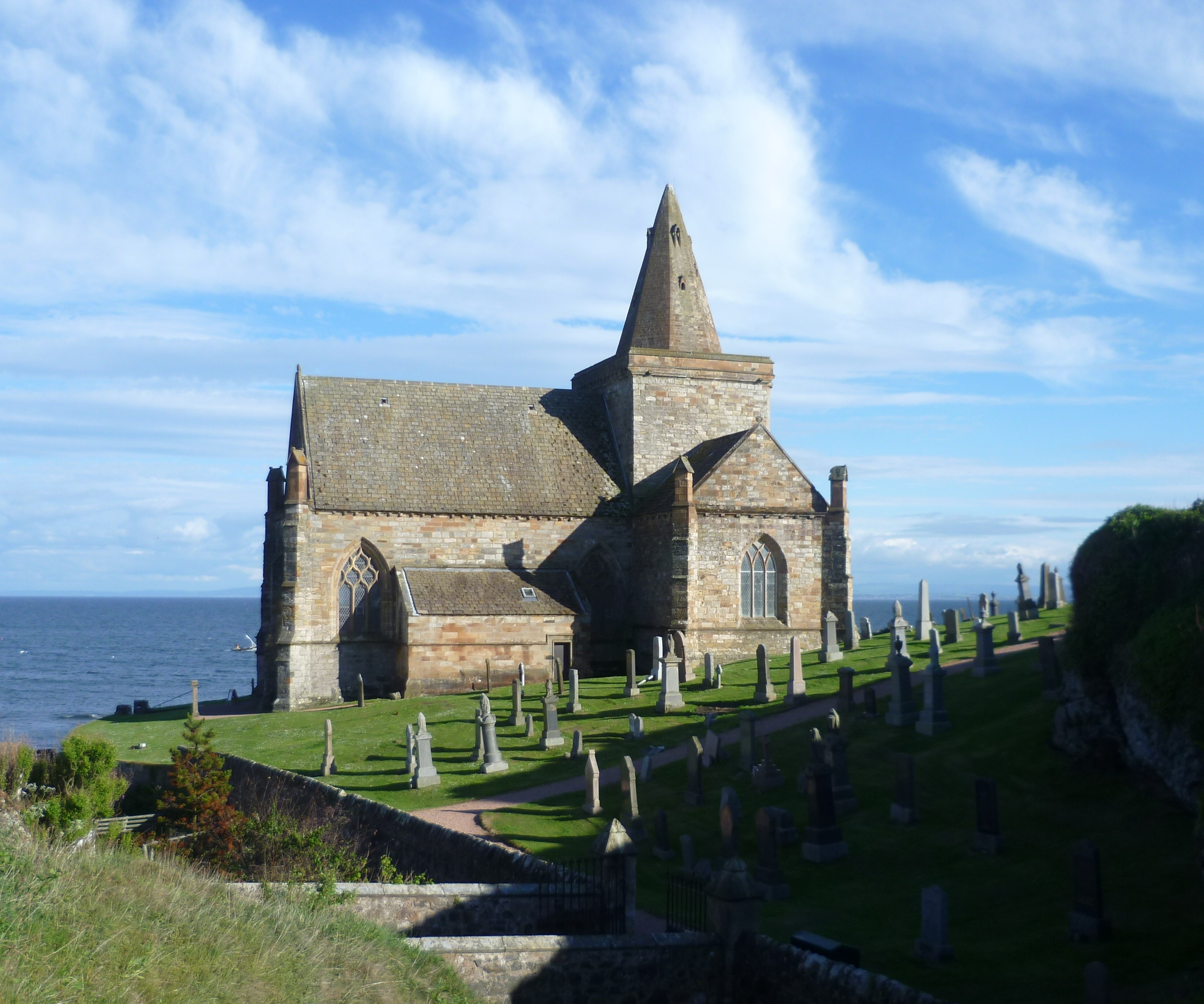
St Monans Parish Church, Fife

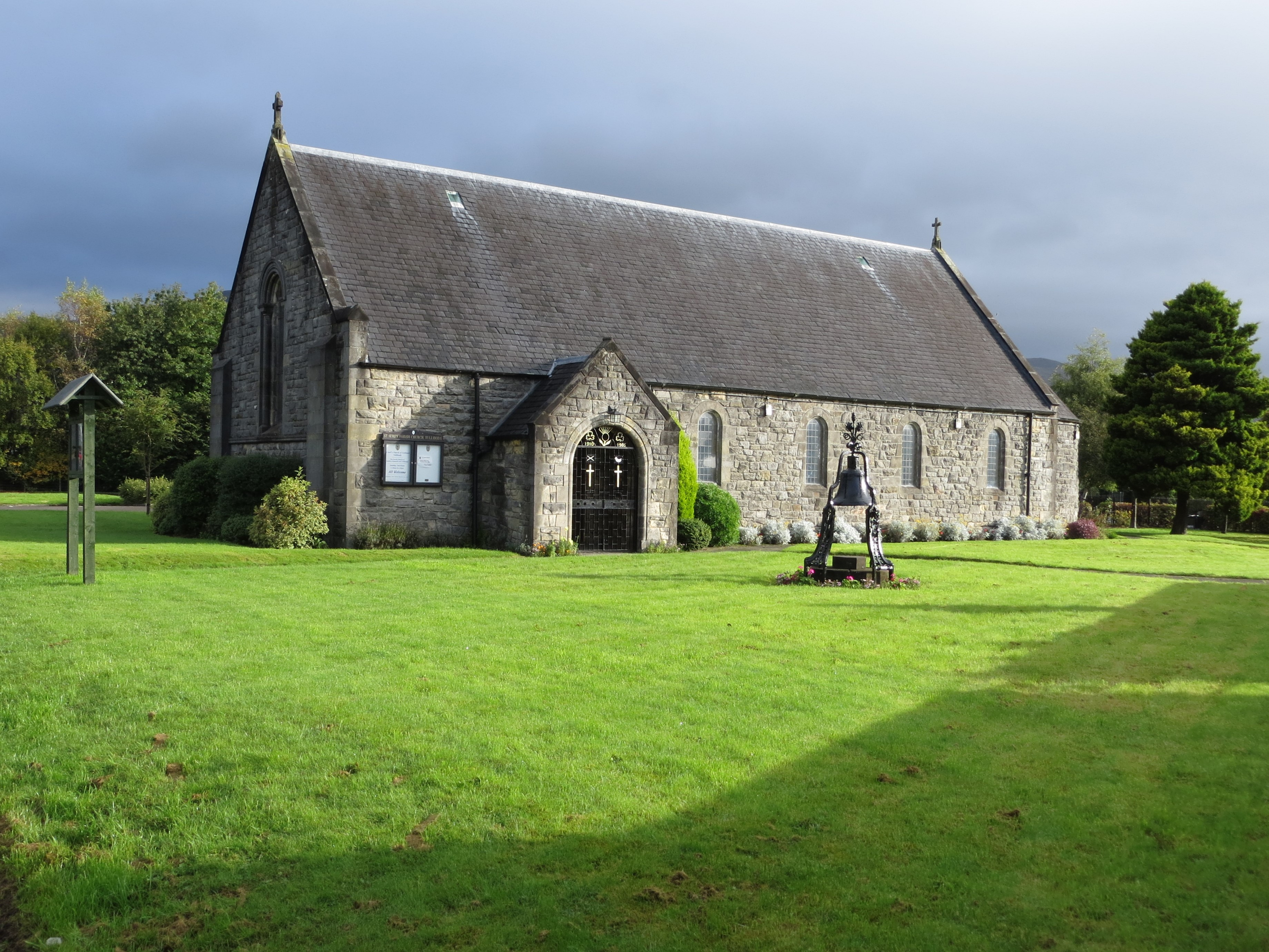
St Serf's Church at Tullibody

== Publications ==
- Glasgow Cathedral
- John Morro, A Scots Medieval Architect
- St Ninians Candid Casa
- The Govan Sarcophagus
- Dalmeny Kirk
- The Shrine of St Constantine
- The Shrines of St Margaret and St Kentigern
