= Queen's Hotel, Kirn =

Listed former hotel in Argyll and Bute, Scotland

Queen's Hotel
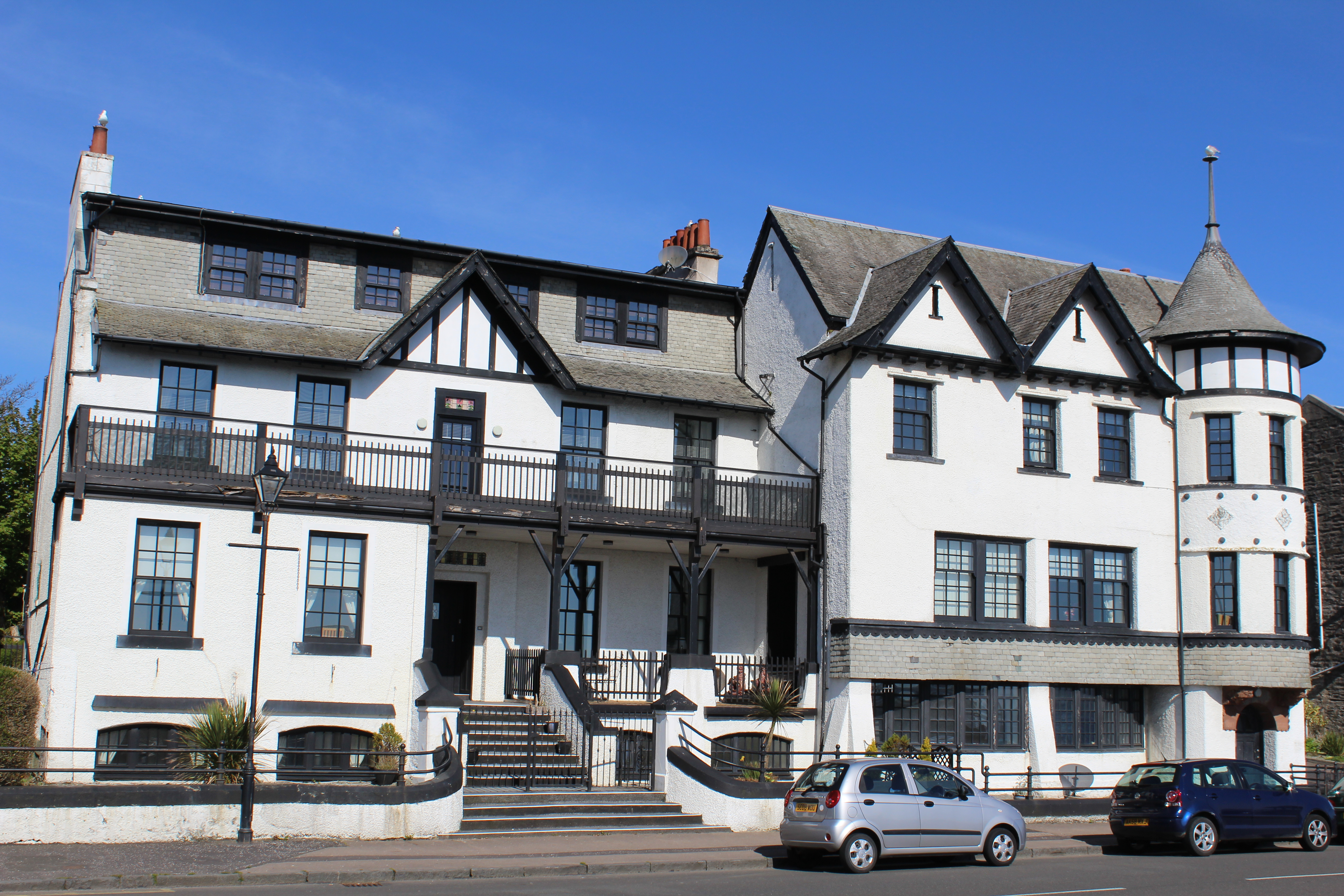
- The building in 2013
- Interactive map of the Queen's Hotel area

General information
- Location: Marine Parade, Kirn, Argyll and Bute, Scotland
- Coordinates: 55.960472°N 4.911020°W
- Opening: c. 1859

Technical details
- Floor count: 3

The Queen's Hotel was a hotel located on Marine Parade in Kirn, Argyll and Bute, Scotland. Now a private residence, it is a Category C listed building, dating to around 1859. Its first proprietor was Mrs Urquhart.

A building known as the Kirn Inn was on the site by 1837. The inn was renamed after the accession of Queen Victoria in that year, and it appears in the Valuation Roll for 1859 under its later name.

The hotel was expanded in 1904, the work carried out by Boston, Menzies and Morton.

== Gallery ==
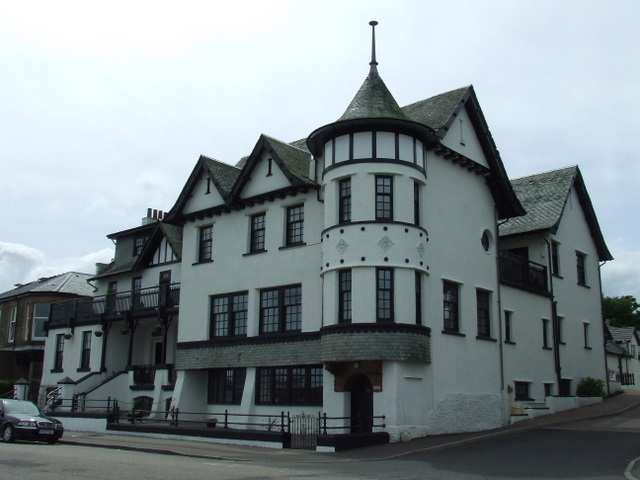
The building's northeastern corner, at Queen's Gardens
