= St Margaret's, Newlands, Glasgow =

St Margaret's Church
- The Parish Church of Saint Margaret of Scotland
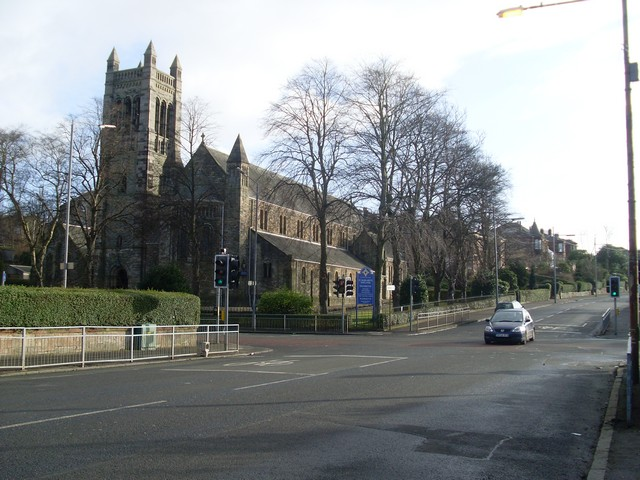
- The church in 2009
- St Margaret's Church
- 55°49′18″N 4°17′12″W
- Location: Glasgow
- Country: Scotland
- Denomination: Scottish Episcopal Church
- Website: Church Website

History
- Status: Active
- Founded: 1898
- Dedication: Saint Margaret of Scotland
- Dedicated: 1923
- Consecrated: 25 December 1928

Architecture
- Functional status: Parish church
- Architect: Peter MacGregor Chalmers
- Architectural type: Church
- Style: Neo-Romanesque
- Groundbreaking: 1911
- Completed: 1935

Administration
- Diocese: Glasgow and Galloway
- Parish: St Margaret's

Clergy
- Bishop: Kevin Pearson
- Priest: Rev. Canon Gordon Fyfe

Listed Building – Category B
- Designated: 15 December 1970
- Reference no.: LB33926

St Margaret's Church is a Category B listed church of the Scottish Episcopal Church at 355 Kilmarnock Road, Newlands, Glasgow, Scotland.

== History ==
St Margaret's was founded as a mission of St Ninian's Church, Pollokshields in 1898. The congregation met in shop premises, the first service taking place on 15 November 1898. The current church site was donated by Sir John Stirling Maxwell in 1908. The church, vestry and church hall were designed by Peter MacGregor Chalmers in 1895, in the Scots/German Neo-Romanesque style. The church hall was built by November 1908.

The foundation stone for the church was laid by Robert Alexander Ogg, and work commenced on building the nave, side aisles, the base of the bell tower, and western apse, which were all completed in 1912. In 1922, work commenced on building the chancel and Lady Chapel, both of which were designed by Gordon Galloway. The church was officially dedicated to Saint Margaret of Scotland in 1923, and consecrated on 25 December 1928. The bell tower was completed by 1935, having been altered in 1915 when it was decided to build a tower rather than a spire.

== Works of art ==
The church is adorned with various mosaics and stained glass windows.

=== Western apse and baptistery ===
The western apse, which is used as the Baptistery. It is adorned with a Mosaic floor which was laid to mark the church's Golden Jubilee in 1958. The mosaics represent the children who were part of the congregation in past years and depict numerous objects associated with children. The apse mosaic was made in 1921 and depicts the descent of the Holy Spirit.

There are also three stained glass windows which were made by Morris & Co. and depict the Annunciation, the Baptism of Christ, and Christ blessing children. These were installed between 1923 and 1926. The Baptismal font is made of Italian marble and was dedicated in 1912. It depicts an angel holding a scallop shell.

=== North aisle ===
The north aisle includes a set of stained glass windows which depict the beatitudes. Some of these were made by James Powell and Sons in the 1930s, while others were made between 1950 and 1960 by Gordon Webster.

=== East apse and chancel ===
The chancel apse mosaic was designed by James Powell and Sons in 1927. It depicts Christ in Glory sitting on a throne over a rainbow, surrounded by the Four Evangelists, the Seraphim four Archangels, and the Heavenly host.

The high altar was dedicated in 1920, and was designed in the Romanesque Style by Peter MacGregor Chalmers. The choir is made of Austria oak and was designed by Gordon Galloway. These were completed in 1923, including the pulpit. The organ case was completed in 1924 while the Bishop's chair was completed in 1926. The organ is the work of Blackett and Howden, and was dedicated in 1924.

The stained glass windows include; The Transfiguration and The Ascension of Christ by James Powell and Sons (1927); The Crucifixion, The Adoration of the Magi, and The Resurrection of Christ by Morris & Co. (1924-1927); St John by Gordon Webster (1973); and Abraham by Hugh McCulloch (1927).

=== South aisle ===
The south aisle contains a number of stained glass windows; Christ commissioning his disciples to preach the Gospel by James Powell and Sons (1935), Saint Margaret of Scotland by the St. Enoch Studio (1949), Simeon by Gordon Webster (1971), Saint Thomas by Roland Mitton (1997), Gethsemane by John Clark (2001), and the Last Supper and The supper at Emmaus by John Clark (2002).

=== Lady Chapel ===
The Lady Chapel, located at the eastern side of the chancel, contains a set of stained glass windows which depict the life of Saint Margaret of Scotland. These were made by James Powell and Sons and were installed and dedicated in 1930.
