= Chapel of Garioch =

Hamlet in Aberdeenshire, Scotland

Coordinates: 57°18′23″N 2°28′20″W

- Location within Aberdeenshire
- Council area: Aberdeenshire
- Lieutenancy area: Aberdeenshire
- Country: Scotland
- Sovereign state: United Kingdom
- Post town: INVERURIE
- Postcode district: AB51
- Police: Scotland
- Fire: Scottish
- Ambulance: Scottish
- UK Parliament: Gordon and Buchan
- Scottish Parliament: Aberdeenshire West

Chapel of Garioch is a hamlet in Aberdeenshire, Scotland, located 4 miles (6.4 km) west of Inverurie. The Balquhain stone circle is nearby.

The church, St Mary's Chapel, shares a parish with Blairdaff. It was formerly under the patronage of the local Elphinstone lairds.

Chapel of Garioch is in the West Garioch ward of Aberdeenshire Council.

== History ==
The hamlet was formerly called Logie Durno or Durnock, but was renamed when the chapel was built in the early 17th century.

The Battle of Harlaw was fought here in 1411.

Pittodrie House is a Category B listed building and former seat of the Erskine family. It consists of a medieval tower house (c. 1490), with later Jacobean (1675) and neo-Jacobean (1841) additions.
