= Blairmore, Argyll =

Coordinates: 56.001260°N 4.9009824°W

Blairmore: Scottish Gaelic: Am Blàr Mòr
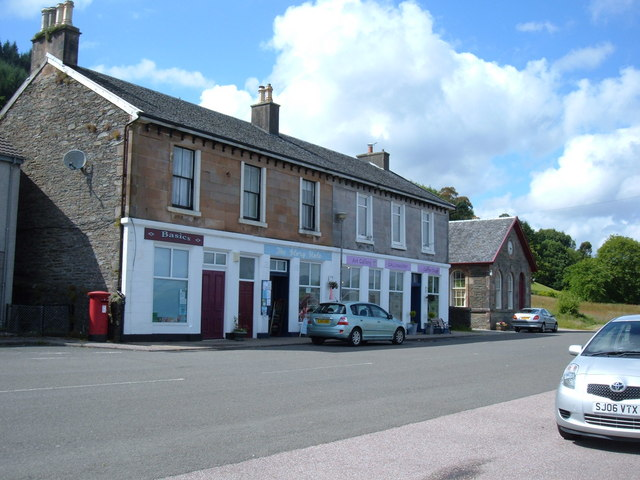
- Blairmore Village Hall and shops.

- Location within Argyll and Bute
- OS grid reference: NS 19200 82500
- Council area: Argyll and Bute
- Lieutenancy area: Argyll and Bute
- Country: Scotland
- Sovereign state: United Kingdom
- Post town: DUNOON, ARGYLL
- Postcode district: PA23
- Dialling code: 01369
- UK Parliament: Argyll, Bute and South Lochaber
- Scottish Parliament: Argyll and Bute

Blairmore is a village located on the Cowal Peninsula, in Argyll and Bute, west of Scotland. Blairmore lies within the Loch Lomond and The Trossachs National Park. It is situated on the western shore of Loch Long and around 1 mile (1.6 km) north of Strone. The village was largely built during the Victorian era and has a small wooden pier which dates to 1855.

== Gallery ==
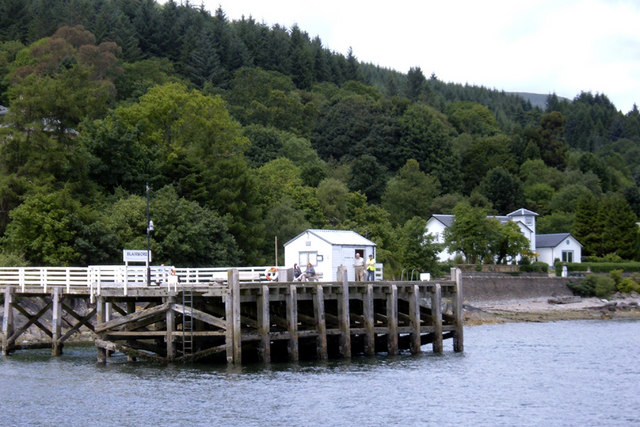
Blairmore Pier

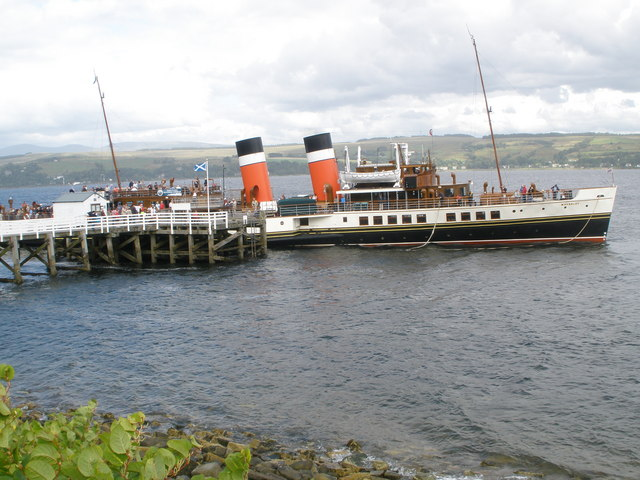
Paddle steamer Waverley about to leave Blairmore pier

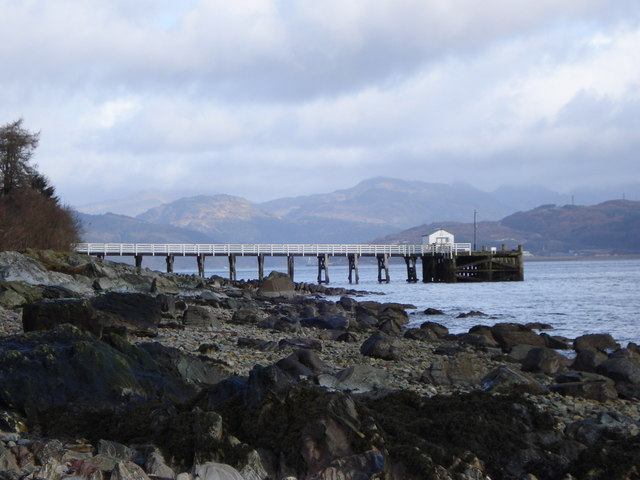
Blairmore Pier

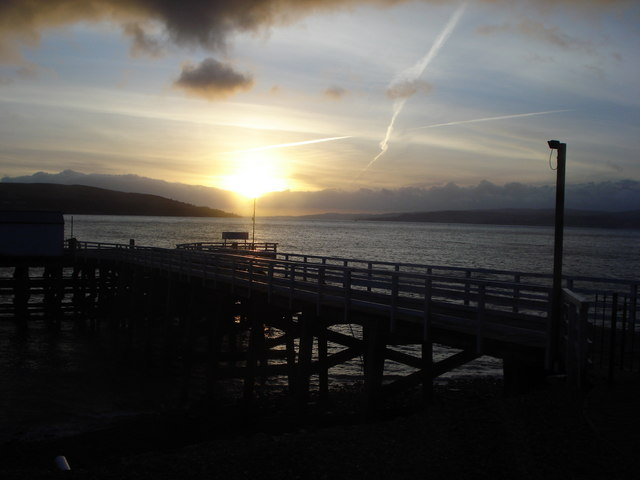
Blairmore Pier - geograph.org.uk - 758676
