= Kirn & Sandbank Parish Church =

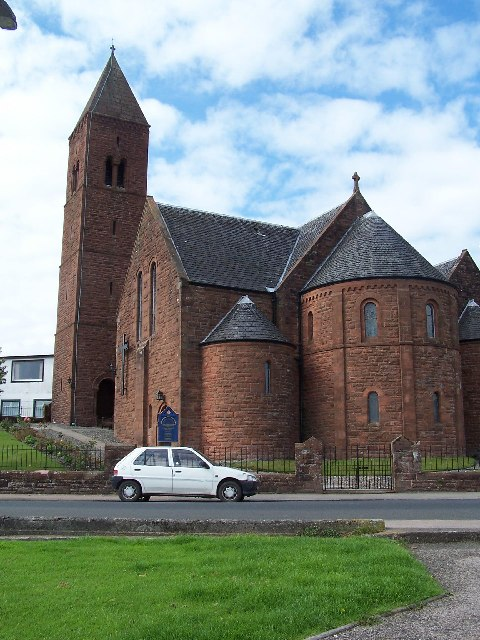
- The church in 2005
- Kirn & Sandbank Parish Church
- 55°57′46″N 4°54′38″W
- Location: 2 Kirn Brae, Kirn, Argyll and Bute
- Country: Scotland
- Denomination: Church of Scotland
- Website: Cowal Kirk website

History
- Status: open

Architecture
- Functional status: used
- Heritage designation: Category B listed building
- Designated: 20 July 1971
- Architect: Peter MacGregor Chalmers
- Architectural type: Romanesque
- Completed: 1907

Kirn & Sandbank Parish Church is a Church of Scotland church building in Kirn, Argyll and Bute, Scotland. It also serves the population of nearby Sandbank. The church is located on Kirn Brae at its junction with Marine Parade, which leads to and from Dunoon, about a mile to the southwest. Constructed in the Romanesque style, it is a Category B listed building.

Its architect was Peter MacGregor Chalmers. Its red sandstone was brought from a quarry at Corrie on the Isle of Arran.

== See also ==
- List of listed buildings in Dunoon
