= St Leonard's Church, Dunfermline =

Church in Dunfermline, Scotland

St Leonard's Church
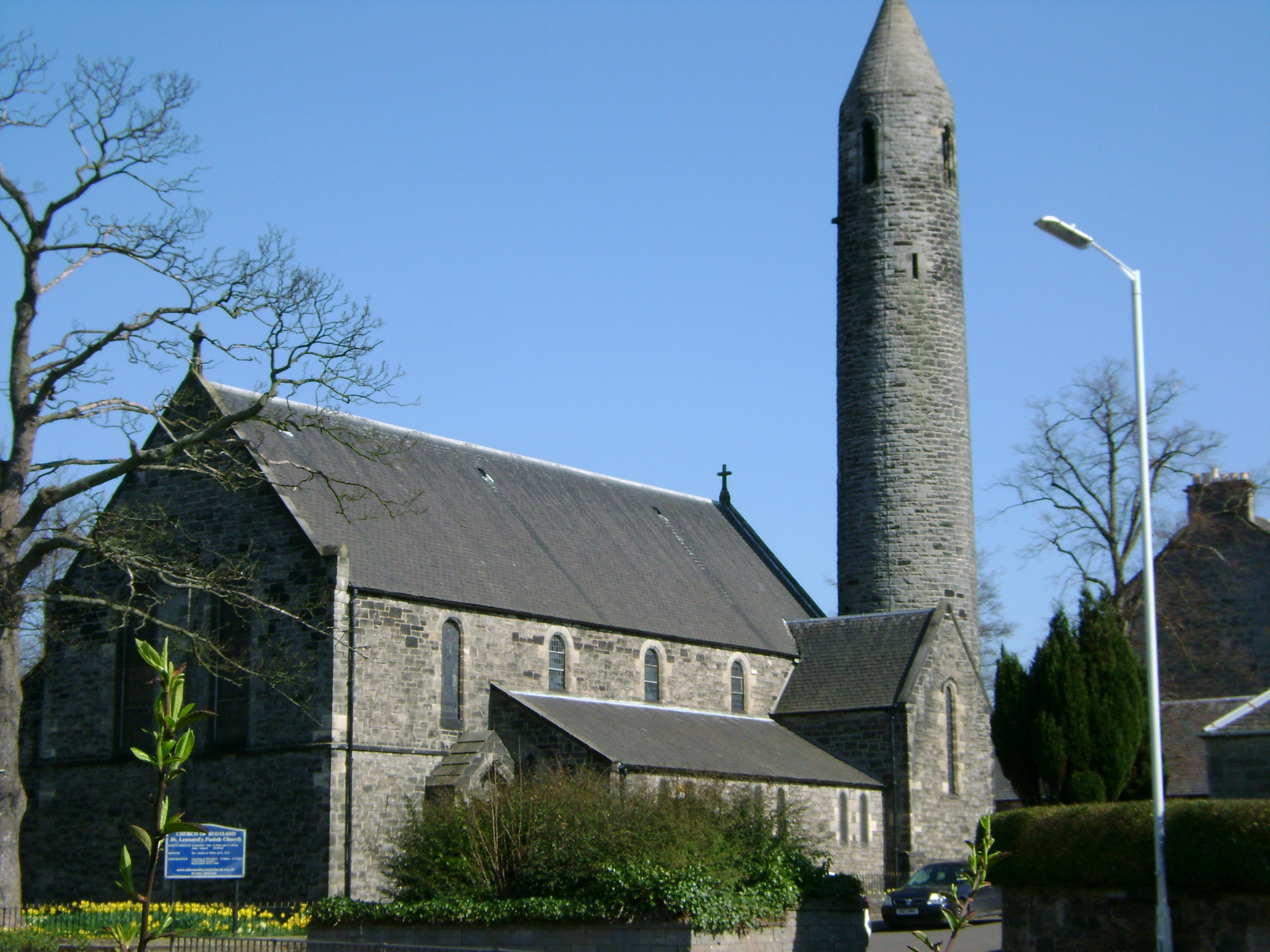
- St Leonard's Church
- 56.066597°N 3.454139°W
- Location: Dunfermline
- Country: Scotland
- Denomination: Church of Scotland
- Churchmanship: Presbyterian, Reformed

History
- Status: Active

St Leonard's Church is a congregation of the Church of Scotland located on Brucefield Avenue, Dunfermline, Scotland.

== History ==
The current church replaced a corrugated iron church which had been built on the site in 1894. It was built between 1903 and 1904 and the church hall was completed in 1908. It was designed by Peter MacGregor Chalmers and built in a neo-Romanesque style. It is a rectangular building with a five-bay nave, L-shaped attached church hall and has a circular tower on the east end of the church. A new church hall was built on the north side in 1987.

It is a Category B listed building due to its mixture of Romanesque and early Christian architecture as well as the style of the tower which shares features of early Celtic Scottish churches.
