= St Columba's Church, Strone =

St Columba's Church
- Strone Church
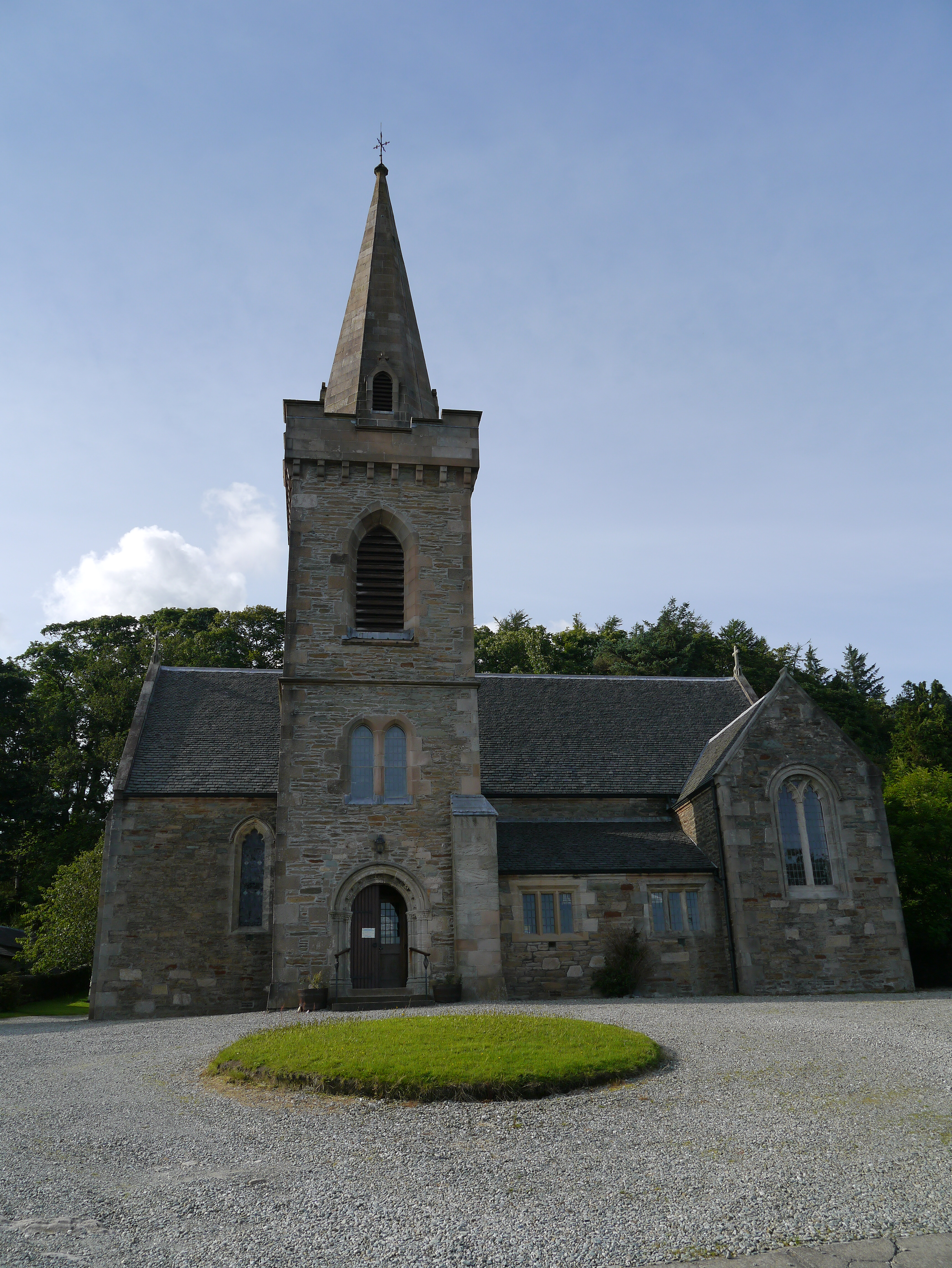
- The church in 2015
- St Columba's Church
- 55°59′02″N 4°53′55″W
- Location: Shore Road, Strone, Argyll and Bute
- Country: Scotland
- Denomination: Church of Scotland

History
- Status: open

Architecture
- Functional status: used
- Heritage designation: Category C listed building
- Designated: 20 July 1971
- Architect: Peter MacGregor Chalmers
- Architectural type: Romanesque
- Completed: 1859 (tower; original); mid-19th century and early 20th century additions

St Columba's Church (also known as Strone Church) is a Church of Scotland church building in Strone, Argyll and Bute, Scotland. The church is located on Shore Road at the mouth of the Holy Loch on its northern banks and near its merging with Loch Long. It is a Category C listed building.

Its architect was Peter MacGregor Chalmers, who was commissioned to build a new church in 1908. He retained the original church tower, adding a Romanesque entrance at its base. It is believed the material from the old church was re-used on the exterior, and Corrie sandstone used in the interior. Its spire is made of ashlar.

== See also ==
- List of listed buildings in Dunoon
