= Strone, Cowal =

Coordinates: 55.985146°N 4.8981713°W

Strone: Scottish Gaelic: An t-Sròn
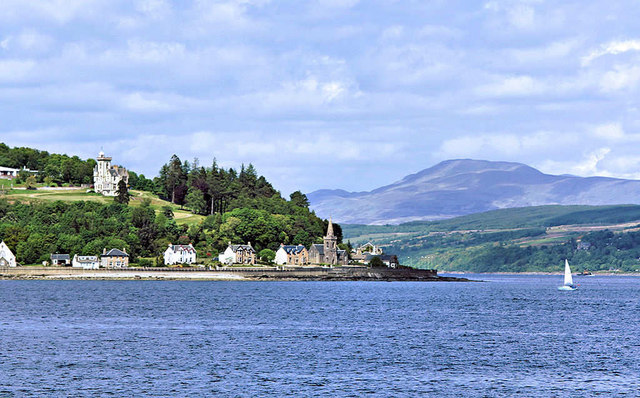
- Strone Point, including St Columba's Church

- Location within Argyll and Bute
- OS grid reference: NS 19300 80700
- Council area: Argyll and Bute
- Lieutenancy area: Argyll and Bute
- Country: Scotland
- Sovereign state: United Kingdom
- Post town: DUNOON, ARGYLL
- Postcode district: PA23
- Dialling code: 01369
- UK Parliament: Argyll, Bute and South Lochaber
- Scottish Parliament: Argyll and Bute

Strone (Scottish Gaelic: An t-Sròn) is a village on the Cowal Peninsula, in Argyll and Bute in the Scottish Highlands at Strone Point, where the north shore of the Holy Loch becomes the west shore of the Firth of Clyde. The village lies within the Loch Lomond and The Trossachs National Park.

== Origin of name ==
The name comes from the Scottish Gaelic for nose, and applies to the hill above the village as well as to Strone Point. It adjoins the settlement of Kilmun on the loch, and the village of Blairmore on Loch Long. It has a (now disused) pier (built in 1847) and was a regular stop for the Clyde steamer services.

== Village ==
Until within less than twenty years there was no such thing as a human habitation upon this commanding and picturesque promontory, with the exception of a few straggling huts and cottages. Gradually, however, its capabilities for the erection of villa residences began to be appreciated. The inhabitants now look upon an "old settlement," the entire promontory being girdled round about by villas of great architectural beauty.

— Colegate's Guide to Dunoon, Kirn, and Hunter's Quay (John Colegate, 1868)

A high road on the side of the hill serves additional houses including Dunselma, a Scottish baronial style house above the point. It was built as a sailing lodge for the wealthy Coats family (proprietors of the eponymous Paisley mills) in 1885–87 by the Paisley firm of Rennison and Scott. It was bought by the Scottish Youth Hostels Association in 1941, and they used it as a hostel until 1965. It still forms a landmark clearly visible from the other side of the Clyde, and is a Category A listed building. It is on the A880 road.

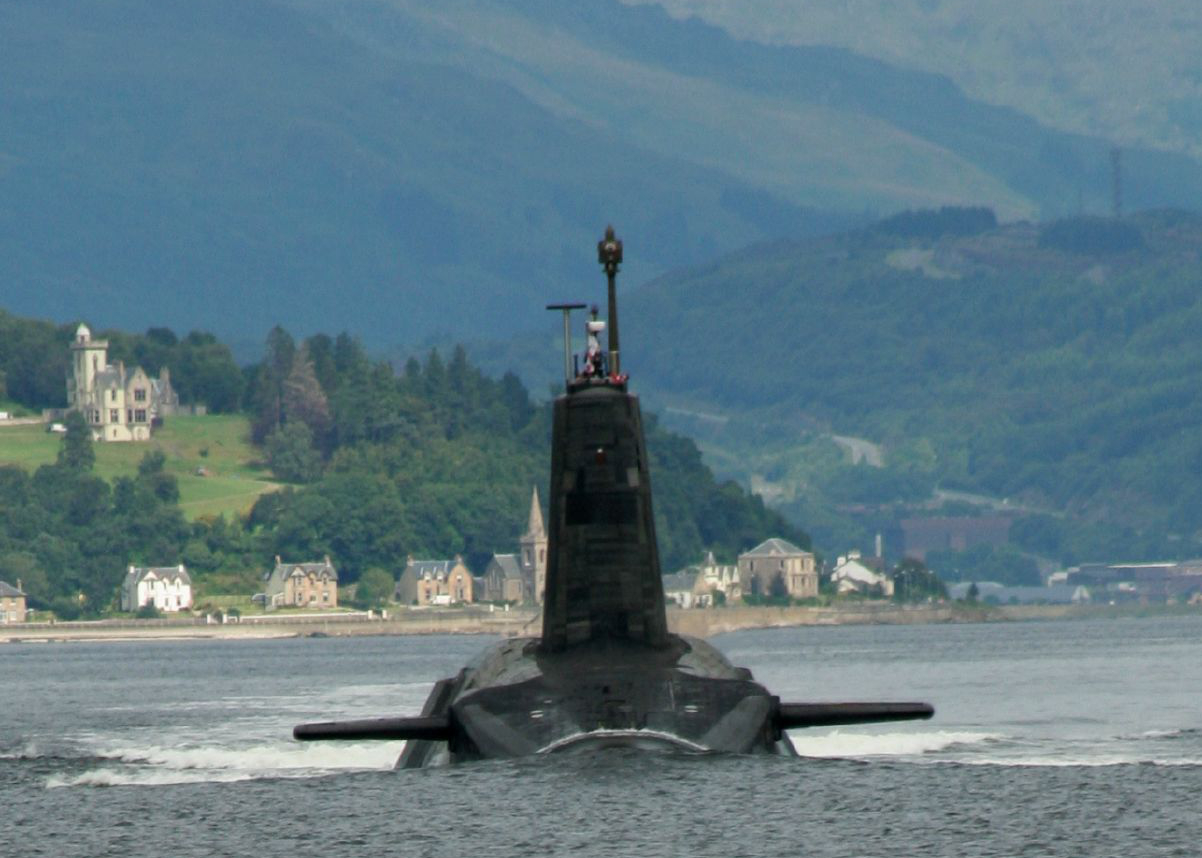
A Vanguard-class submarine leaving its base on the Clyde. The village of Strone is visible in the background.

== Gallery ==
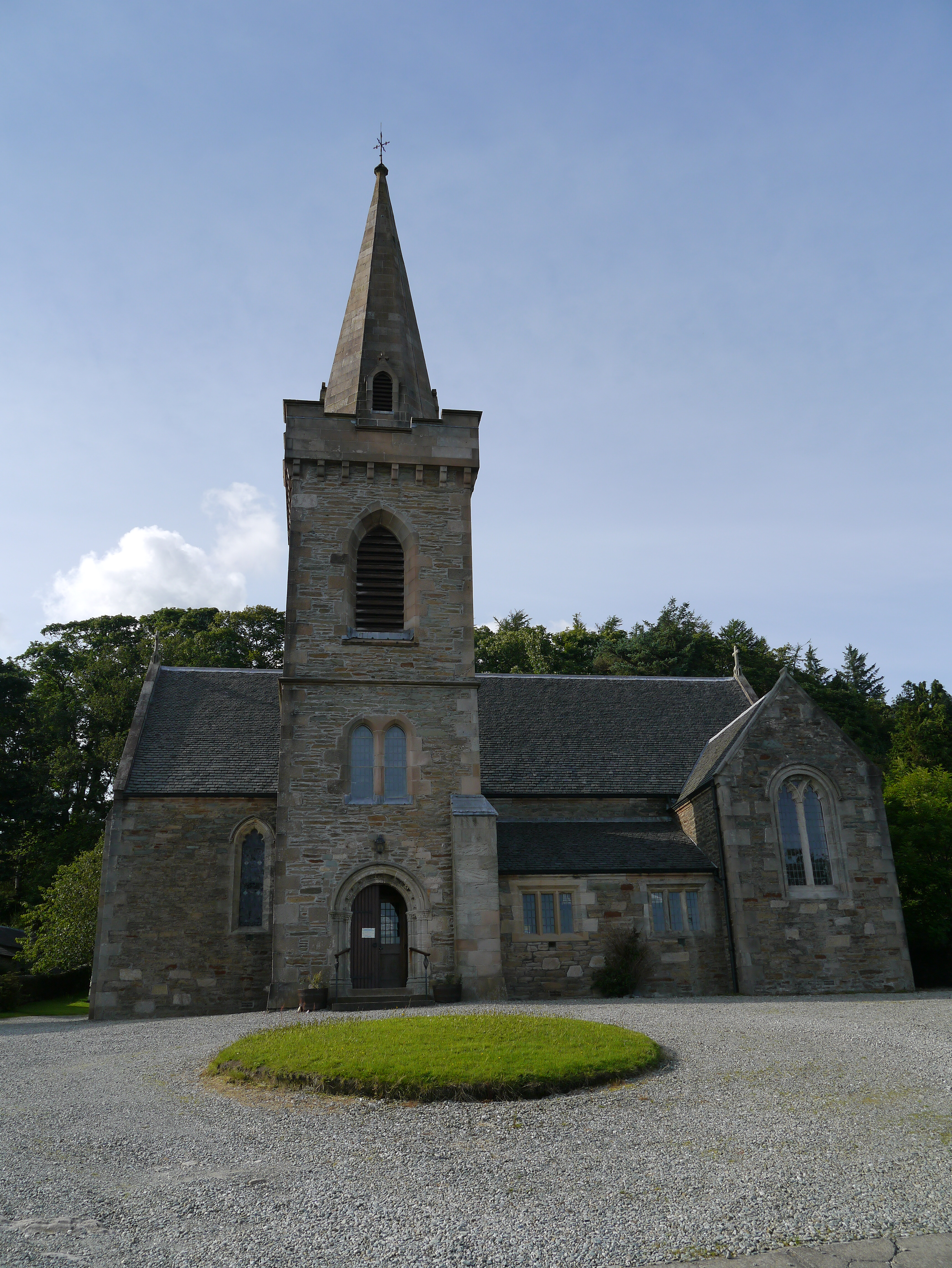
St Columba's Church

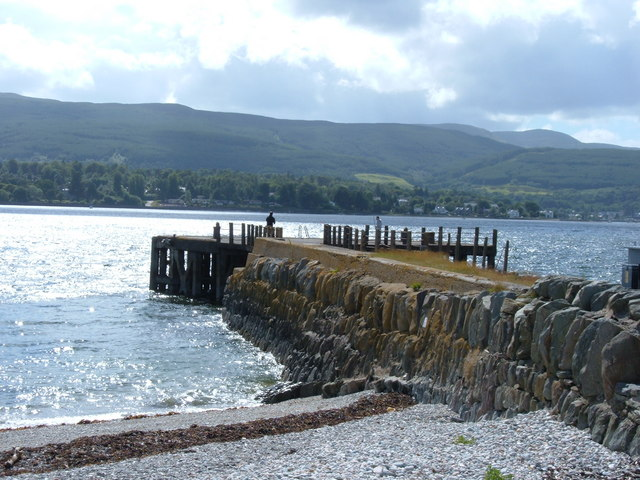
Strone Pier

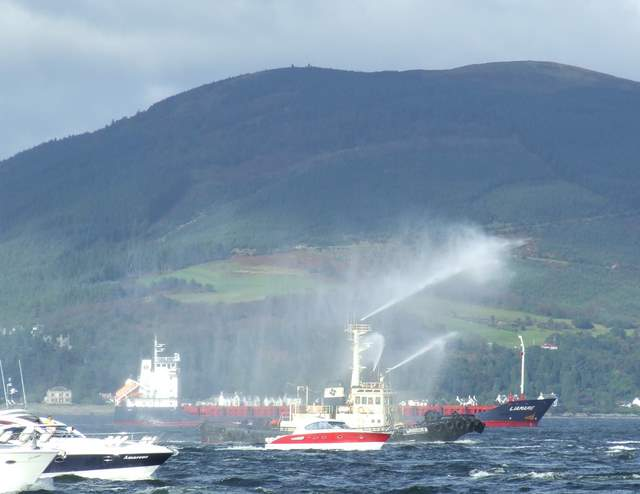
Strone Hill from the Firth of Clyde

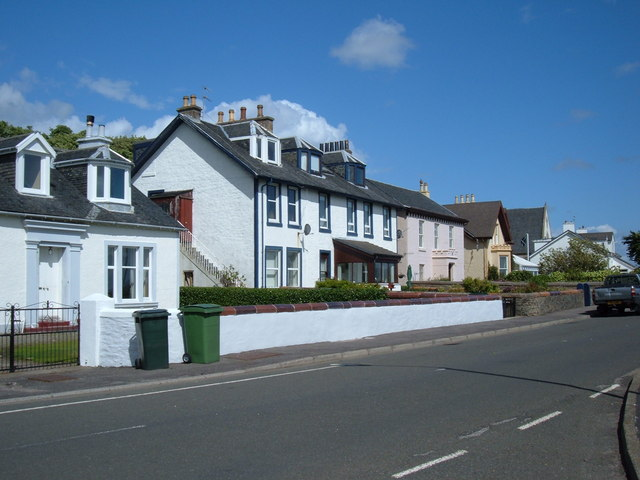
Strone Terrace
