= Blairdaff =

Coordinates: 57.2490°N 2.5058°W

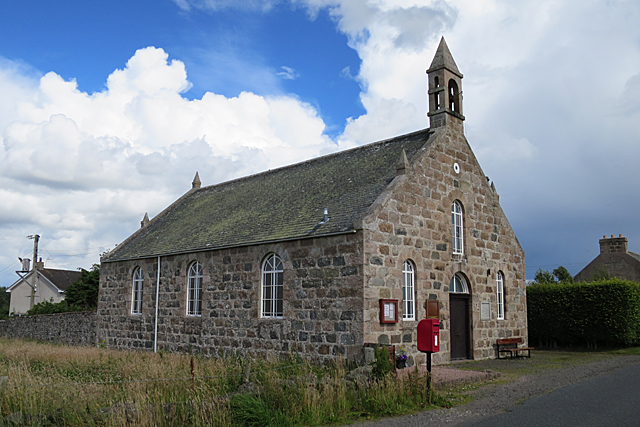
Blairdaff United Free Kirk

Blairdaff is a parish in Garioch, Aberdeenshire, Scotland, next to the villages of Kemnay and Monymusk.

Blairdaff had a grocery store, a post office, and both petrol and diesel pumps until 1986 when only the post office was relocated to Blindburn Farm. Blairdaff Parish Church (Church of Scotland) is linked to the church in the Chapel of Garioch. The original church is located in Blairdaff's courtyard. After a fire in the 1950s, the old church had the roof removed, however, there is a tradition of open air services in the summer months, which continues to this day.
