= Kirn, Dunoon =

Coordinates: 55.962260°N 4.9156898°W

Kirn
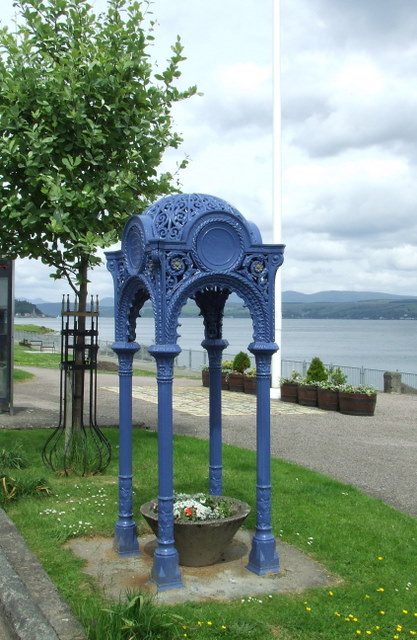
- Cast iron fountain stand on the shorefront at Kirn.

- Location within Argyll and Bute
- Population: 5,198 (2013 Est) Including; Kirn, Hunters Quay and Sandbank.
- OS grid reference: NS 18100 78200
- Council area: Argyll and Bute
- Lieutenancy area: Argyll and Bute
- Country: Scotland
- Sovereign state: United Kingdom
- Post town: DUNOON, ARGYLL
- Postcode district: PA23
- Dialling code: 01369
- UK Parliament: Argyll, Bute and South Lochaber
- Scottish Parliament: Argyll and Bute

Kirn is a village on the Cowal Peninsula, in Argyll and Bute in the Scottish Highlands on the west shore of the Firth of Clyde on the Cowal peninsula. It now forms part of the continuous habitation between Dunoon and Hunters Quay, where the Holy Loch joins the Firth of Clyde. It originally had its own pier, with buildings designed by Harry Edward Clifford in 1895, and was a regular stop for the Clyde steamer services, bringing holidaymakers to the town, mostly from the Glasgow area.

== Schools ==
=== Kirn Primary School ===
Established in 1881 and located on Park Road, the school moved into new premises in 2018. The original building was retained and refurbished.

=== Dunoon Grammar School ===
Dunoon Grammar School is situated on Ardenslate Road, next to Cowal Golf Club in Kirn.

== Recreation ==
The three facilities listed below are located on Ardenslate Road.

- Cowal Golf Club is situated on the hillside above Kirn. Founded in October 1891, initially as a nine-hole course designed by Willie Campbell from Bridge of Weir. It was formerly an eighteen-hole course, reconstructed by James Braid between 1924 and 1928. The current clubhouse was built in 1996. Due to financial issues, club assets were sold off in 2020. The golf club is still trading, although as a result of a land sale the course is now only a twelve-hole course. The club is now owned by "Cowal Golf and Lodge Resort LTD".
- Kirn & Hunters Quay Bowling Club
- Cowal Indoor Bowling Club

== Kirn Pier ==
Kirn Pier was demolished, the only buildings left are the shore side entry buildings.

== Kirn Parish Church ==
Kirn & Sandbank Parish Church is a red sandstone building in the centre of the village.

== Gallery ==
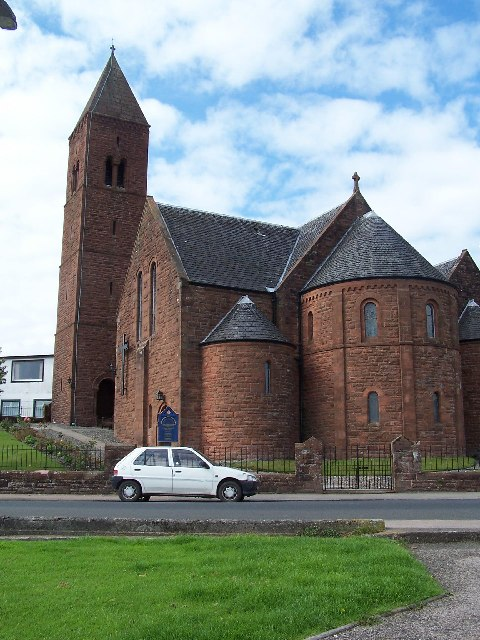
Kirn & Sandbank Parish Church

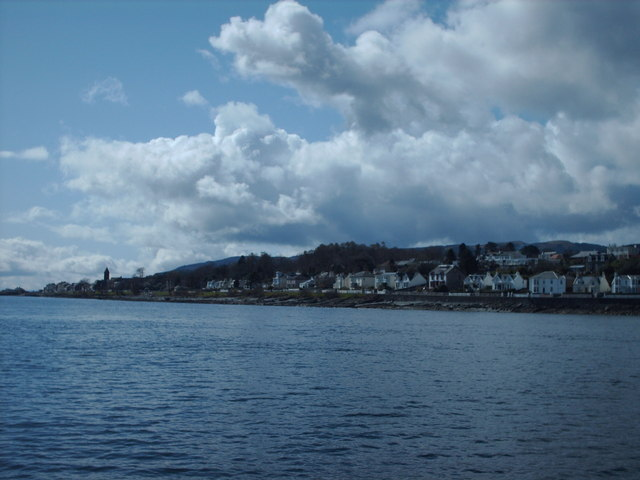
Looking to Kirn

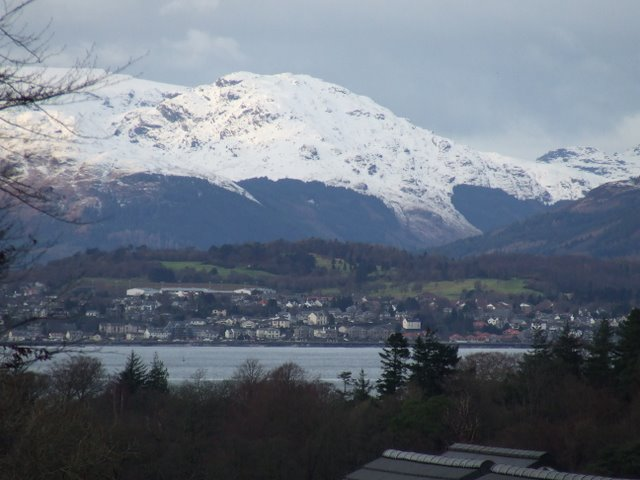
Kirn and the River Clyde from Inverkip

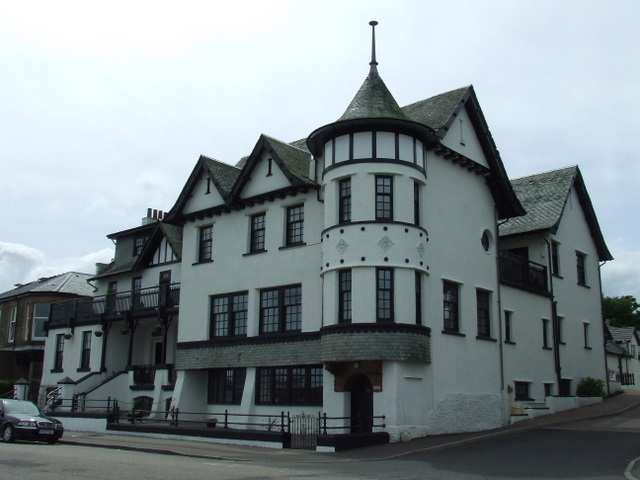
The former Queen's Hotel

== Bibliography ==
- Inspectors want to use Cowal school as model for excellence : Cowal Courier
- Argyll, Cowal and Dunoon News | Dunoon Observer and Argyllshire Standard
- Kirn Primary hailed as beacon of educational excellence : Cowal Courier
