= Henry Edgar =

Scottish Episcopal minister

The Right Reverend Henry Edgar
- Bishop of Fife
- Church: Scottish Episcopal Church
- Diocese: Fife
- In office: 1762-1765
- Predecessor: Robert White
- Successor: Vacant see
- Previous post: Coadjutor Bishop of Fife (1759-1761)

Orders
- Consecration: 18 October 1759 by Robert White

Personal details
- Born: 2 April 1698 Keithock, Scotland
- Died: 22 August 1765 (aged 67) Arbroath, Scotland
- Buried: Arbroath Abbey
- Denomination: Anglican

Styles of Henry Edgar
- Reference style: The Right Reverend
- Spoken style: My Lord or Bishop

Henry Edgar (2 April 1698 – 22 August 1765) was a Scottish Episcopal minister who served as the Bishop of Fife from 1762 to 1765.

He was born in Keithock, near Brechin, and baptised on 2 April 1698, the son of David Edgar and Elizabeth Guthrie. He was educated at Marischal College, Abedeen from 1712 to 1714. He married Barbara Rait (1692–1774), daughter of the Reverend William Rait, Incumbent of Monikie, and Isobel Yeaman, and sister of the Right Reverend James Rait, Bishop of Brechin.

His first pastoral appointments were as assistant minister (1727–29) and then Incumbent (1729–32) at Careston, followed by as the Incumbent of Arbroath (1732–65); a post he held until his death. After the Jacobite rising of 1745, Edgar was arrested for not praying for King George II but the case dismissed by the local magistrates after he said that he had "prayed for the King".

He was appointed coadjutor bishop of Fife and consecrated at Cupar on 18 October 1759 by Robert White, Primus of the Scottish Episcopal Church, with bishops Falconer, Rait, and Alexander serving as co-consecrators. Following the death of Robert White in 1761, Edgar became Bishop of Fife on 24 June 1762.

He died in office in Arbroath on 22 August 1765, aged 67, and was buried in the grounds of Arbroath Abbey.

== Bibliography ==
- Bertie, David M. (2000). Scottish Episcopal Clergy, 1689–2000. Edinburgh: T & T Clark. ISBN 0567087468.
- Gordon, J. F. S. (1867). Scotichronicon: Comprising Bishop Keith's Catalogue of Scottish Bishops. Vol. 2. Glasgow: John Tweed.
- Keith, Robert (1824). Russel, Michael (ed.). An Historical Catalogue of the Scottish Bishops: Down To The Year 1688. Edinburgh: Printed for Bell and Bradfute.

Scottish Episcopal Church titles
Preceded by Robert White	Bishop of Fife; 1762–1765	Succeeded by See vacant, followed by Daniel Sandford (administrator)
