= Andrew Gerard =

Scottish Episcopal minister

Styles of Andrew Gerard
- Reference style: The Right Reverend
- Spoken style: My Lord or Bishop

Andrew Gerard (died 1767) was a Scottish Episcopal minister who served as the Bishop of Aberdeen from 1746 to 1767.

The son of Andrew Gerard, a mariner of Aberdeen, he was educated at Marischal College, Aberdeen from 1699 to 1701. He was ordained a deacon in Edinburgh in the 1710s and a priest in Aberdeen in 1725. He served as a chaplain at Balgowan until 1720 and then chaplain to Lord Nairne from 1720 to 1728. His next appointment was as a curate at St John's, Aberdeen (1728–1733), where he assisted the Reverend George Garden. Gerard eventually became the Incumbent of St John's, Aberdeen (1733–1767); a position which he kept until his death. He married sometime before December 1731 to Mrs Burnett, widow of Robert Burnett (son of the Reverend John Burnett, Incumbent of Monymusk).

Following the resignation of William Dunbar in 1745, he was elected Bishop of Aberdeen and was consecrated at Cupar on 17 July 1746 by bishops Robert White, John Alexander, William Falconer and James Rait.

Bishop Gerard died in office in Aberdeen on 7 October 1767, and was buried on 9 October 1767.

== Bibliography ==
- Bertie, David M. (2000). Scottish Episcopal Clergy, 1689–2000. Edinburgh: T & T Clark. ISBN 0567087468.
- Keith, Robert (1824). Russel, Michael (ed.). An Historical Catalogue of the Scottish Bishops: Down To The Year 1688. Edinburgh: Printed for Bell and Bradfute.

Scottish Episcopal Church titles
Preceded by William Dunbar	Bishop of Aberdeen; 1746–1767	Succeeded by Robert Kilgour
