= Scottish Prayer Book (1929) =

Liturgical book of the Scottish Episcopal Church

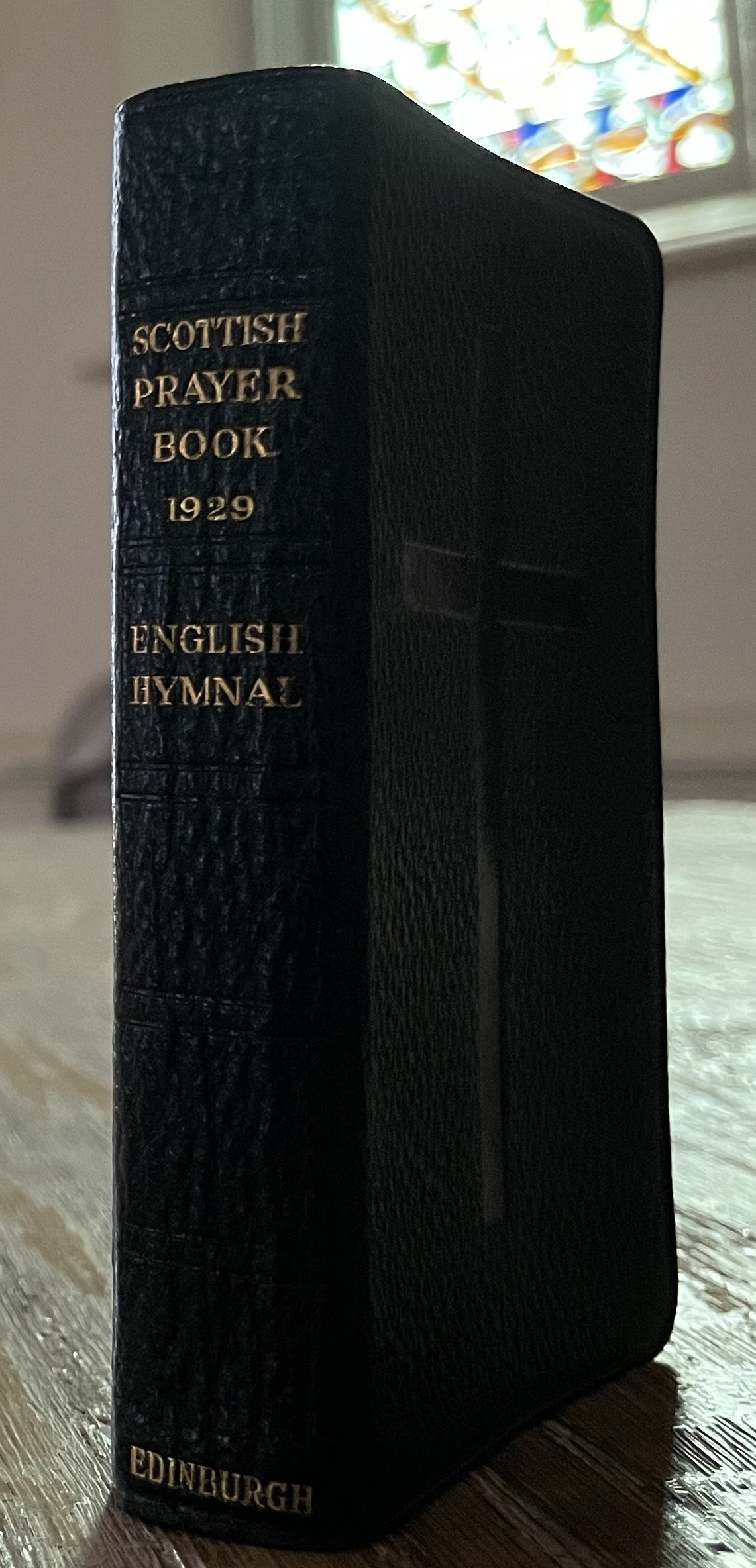
The Scottish Prayer Book 1929.

The 1929 Scottish Prayer Book (Note: The official full title of the book is The Scottish Book of Common Prayer and Administration of the Sacraments and Other Rites and Ceremonies of the Church together with The Psalter Pointed as it is to be Sung or Said in Churches and the Form or Manner of Making, Ordaining and Consecrating of Bishops, Priests and Deacons, following titling conventions extant from the initial period of prayer book production.) is an official liturgical book of the Scotland-based Scottish Episcopal Church. The 1929 edition follows from the same tradition of other versions of the Book of Common Prayer used by the churches within the Anglican Communion and Anglicanism generally, with the unique liturgical tradition of Scottish Anglicanism. It contains both the forms of the Eucharistic liturgy and Daily Office, as well as additional public liturgies and personal devotions. The second major revision of the Book of Common Prayer following the full independence of the Scottish Episcopal Church, the 1929 Scottish Prayer Book succeeded the 1912 edition and was intended to serve alongside the Church of England's 1662 prayer book.

== Background ==
Following the English Reformation and the separation of the Church of England from the Catholic Church, the liturgies of Anglicanism were translated into English. The first such production was the 1549 Book of Common Prayer, traditionally considered the work of Thomas Cranmer, which replaced both the missals and breviaries of Catholic usage. Among these liturgies were the Communion service and canonical hours of Matins and Evensong, with the addition of the Ordinal containing the form for the consecration of bishops, priests, and deacons in 1550.

=== Earlier Scottish Protestant liturgies ===
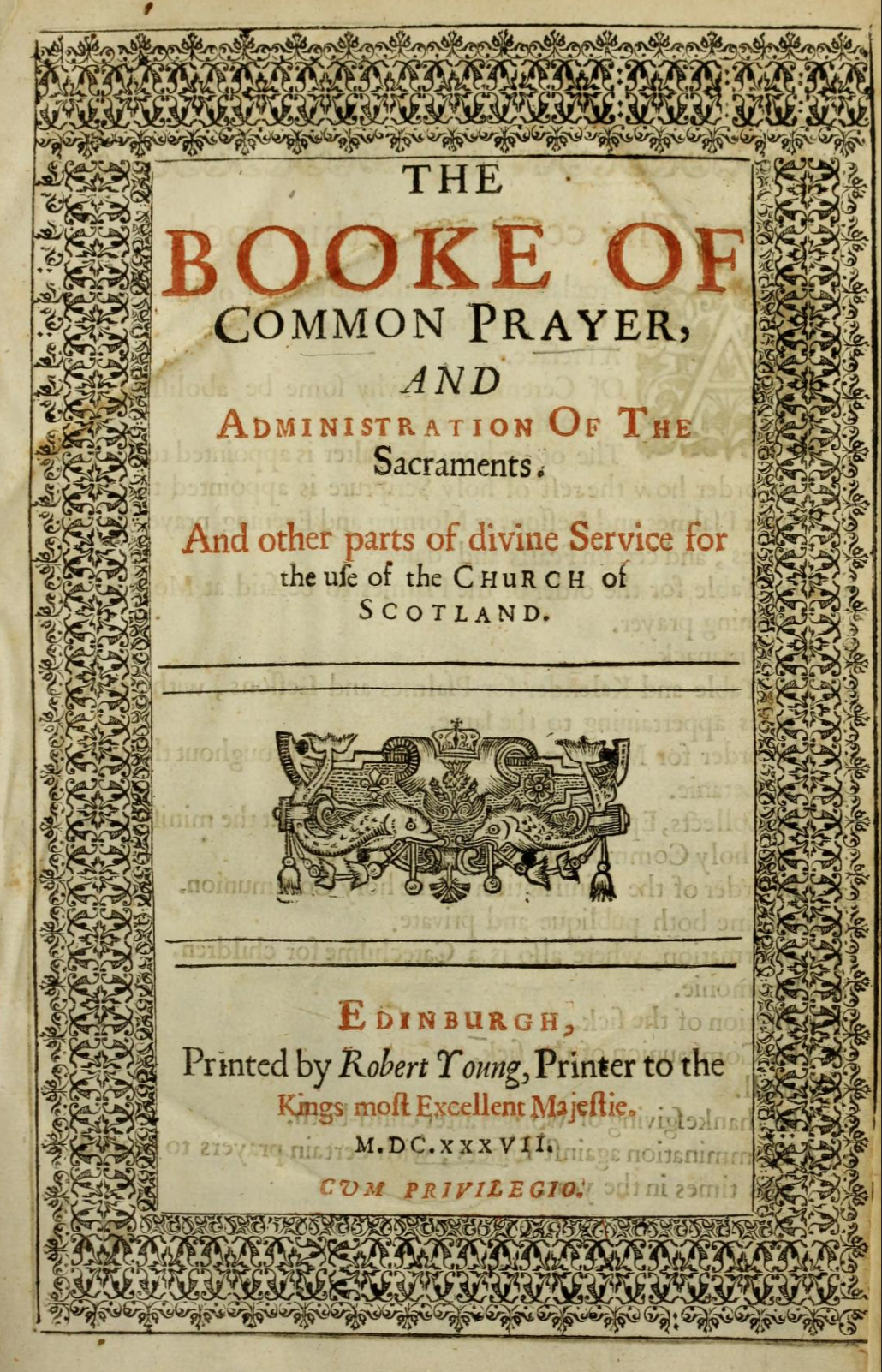
Title page of the rejected Scottish 1637 Book of Common Prayer

In 1557, as the Scottish Reformation began to see civil and ecclesiastical formalization, several options for a standard Scottish Protestant liturgy arose. The English and some Scottish Protestants sought to standardize worship on the Church of England's 1552 Book of Common Prayer. However, the arrival in 1559 of the heavily reform-minded John Knox from Geneva also brought his Calvinist liturgy and influence. Knox's text was adapted for Scottish usage in 1560, and officially adopted as the Book of Common Order in 1562 in lieu of the 1559 Book of Common Prayer adopted in England.

William Laud, the Archbishop of Canterbury from 1633 to 1645, was an anti-Calvinist and ritualist who proposed a series of liturgical reforms generally known as Laudianism. After Church of Scotland bishops opposed Laud's plan to introduce the contemporary English Book of Common Prayer, he assented to a separate prayer book based more heavily on the 1549 edition. On the introduction of the new prayer book in Sunday, 23 July 1637, in St Giles' Cathedral in Edinburgh, tradition states that a certain Jenny Geddes–angered by the introduction of a supposedly more Catholic service book–protested by throwing a stool at the celebrating minister, leading to a riot that eventually spawned the First Bishop's War.

The Scottish rejection of the 1637 prayer book is considered a distant cause to the English Civil War and the resulting Puritan Protectorate under Oliver Cromwell. Following the 1688 Glorious Revolution, the Presbyterian camp in Scotland reestablished the Church of Scotland under their preferred polity and liturgical norms in 1690. Non-jurors succeeded in establishing a separate Scottish Episcopal Church, officially recognized under the Scottish Episcopalians Act 1711. This new Scottish Episcopal Church attempted to use the 1637 prayer book which was to be printed anew, though after a period of slow reintroduction of liturgical worship and private usage of the English prayer book. Despite the 1712 reprint of the 1637 prayer book, several political factors led to the English prayer book's increasing popularity. Non-jurors followed these Laudian attempts with their own "Communion Office" in 1718, which introduced the Summary of the Law as an alternative to the Decalogue, alongside other revisions.

Efforts to further amend the Communion Office to produce a native Scottish liturgy that would be more widely received resulted in a 1755 liturgy promulgated by William Falconer, influenced by Thomas Rattray's work. Falconer, made Primus of the Scottish Episcopal Church, worked with Robert Forbes to produce a further, formally accepted Communion Office in 1764, the same Communion Office that would eventually influence the first prayer book of the Episcopal Church in the United States.

=== Later revisions ===
A draft Communion Office liturgy was produced in 1889, with the removal of the Doxology from the initial Lord's Prayer proving influential on the U.S. Episcopal Church's 1892 Book of Common Prayer. By the late Nineteenth and early Twentieth Centuries, the usage of the 1662 English prayer book was still predominant but had lost favor due to the introduction of hymns extending the typical three Sunday services–Matins, the Litany, and the Communion Office–to over two hours in total. Other criticisms of the 1662 prayer book, including its lack of prayers for mission work and evangelization as well as lacking offices relevant to contemporary celebrations and industrial society, compelled the Scottish Episcopal bishops to establish a committee to produce a domestic prayer book in 1909.

The revision process that led to the 1912 prayer book was initially led by John Dowden, a bishop who had previously written on the history of the Scottish offices. Many of his "additions to and deviations from" the 1662 prayer book ultimately saw inclusion in both the 1912 and 1929 prayer books. Outside the inclusion of the Scottish Communion Office–entitled "The Scottish Liturgy"–these alterations of the 1662 prayer book were limited and were generally options seeking to reduce the length of services. The 1912 prayer book would officially be titled identically to the 1662 prayer book–including reference to the Church of England–with only its longer, full title making note of its inclusion of the Scottish Liturgy and usage by the Scottish Episcopal Church.

== Contents ==
Besides the inclusion of the various services, offices, and associate prayers, the 1929 Scottish Prayer Book contains the Coverdale translation of the Psalter, first introduced to the prayer book tradition in the Church of England's 1662 edition. Two Eucharistic liturgies are provided: one derived from the 1662 edition in its Scottish recension and the other, The Scottish Liturgy, is derived from the 1637 and 1735 Scottish liturgies.

=== Communion Office ===
The Scottish Liturgy features "The Order For A Second Consecration" for use when all the previously consecrated Communion is expended prior to all receiving Communion have been communicated. New to the 1929 prayer book, the initial Lord's Prayer is optional regardless of whether Morning Prayer is said preceding the Communion liturgy.

=== Daily Office ===
The pattern of the 1662 prayer book in reciting the entirely of the Psalter during a 30-day period of saying Morning and Evening Prayer was retained in part, though with certain amendments. To avoid the Sunday recitation of the Imprecatory Psalms–considered potentially difficult to "the scruples of the average Sunday worshipper"–rubrics were altered to remove some from public Sunday services and offer optional omission of other verses. These alterations, resulting in the removal of Psalm 119 from public services, were considered "an attempt to pander to sickly sentiment" by proponents of the 1662 prayer book.

Within Matins, the Te Deum, with the later ending addition, is divided into three sections. The Benedicite is also presented, with the option to alternatively recite the Benedictus es, a hymn also derived from the Song of the Three Holy Children. Following its regular usage by the Edinburgh Theological College in the years preceding the 1929 prayer book, the evening service of Compline was introduced to supplement Evensong.

== Later revision ==
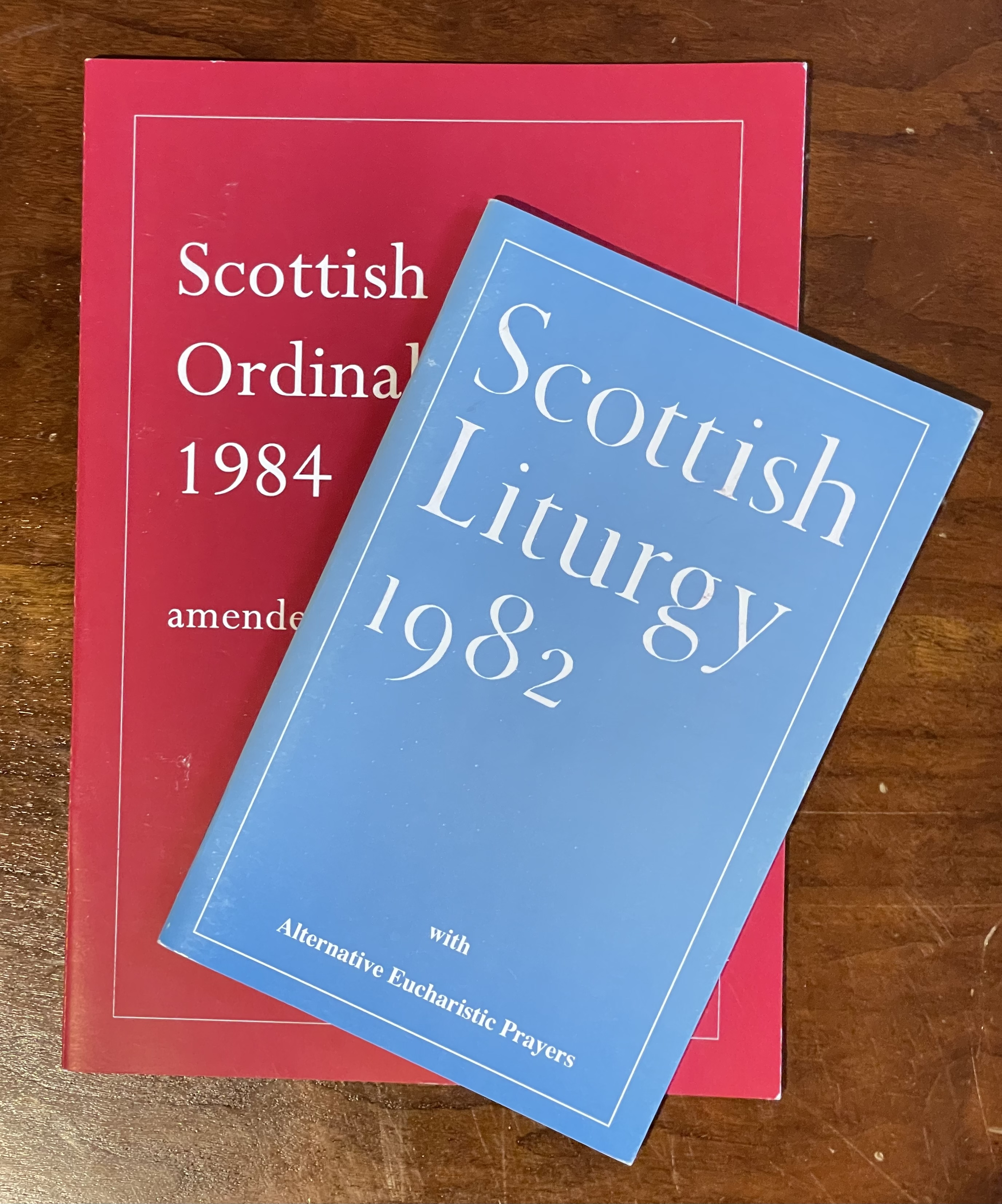
The Scottish Liturgy 1982 and 2006 edition of the Scottish Ordinal 1984

The Scottish Episcopal Church approved several alternative and trial use liturgies to supplement the 1929 prayer book, primarily for usage in the celebration of Holy Communion. Some of these were published in pamphlet form: the 1966 and 1970 in "grey bookies" followed by contemporary language versions in the 1977 "orange bookie" and 1982 "blue bookie." The Scottish Liturgy 1982's revised Anaphora was designed to emphasize the offering of the entire church. The Scottish College of Bishop approved four alternative Eucharistic prayers in 1989, with the previously existing prayer becoming Prayer I. While Prayers II, III, and IV retain significant portions of Prayer I, Prayer V was noted for its distinct and "creative" qualities.

The Funeral Rites 1987 was created as an alternative form for the burial office was created. In response to the COVID-19 pandemic and associate legal restrictions on public gatherings, the 1987 burial liturgy was abbreviated to enable continued Christian burial.

== Influence ==
The versions of the Holy Communion offices present in the approved editions of the Book of Common Prayer produced by the Episcopal Church in the United States follow the 1764 Scottish recension. This influence was evident in the inclusion of the epiclesis in the 1789 American prayer book. The relationship between the Scottish and American churches was in part initiated by the episcopal consecration of Samuel Seabury by the Jacobite Scottish Episcopal bishop Robert Kilgour in 1784, as the Scottish Episcopal Church did not have the Church of England's requirement to swear allegiance to the British Crown. Indeed, in 1784 and while Bishop of Connecticut, Seabury produced a Holy Communion service almost identical to the 1764 version. This tradition continued in the Episcopal Church during the revision process that ultimately produced the current 1979 American edition, during which the Standing Liturgical Commission lamented the lost chance to consult the 1929 Scottish and 1928 proposed English editions before final approval of the 1928 American prayer book. (Note: The Anglican Church of North America included the epiclesis in their 2019 prayer book in part to avoid "a betrayal of American prayer book history to go against the deal that Seabury struck with the Non-Jurors.")

== See also ==
- Alternative Service Book
- Book of Alternative Services
- Book of Common Prayer (1604)
- The English Hymnal
- Hymnbooks of the Church of Scotland
