= Charles Rose (bishop) =

Styles of Charles Rose
- Reference style: The Right Reverend
- Spoken style: My Lord
- Religious style: Bishop

Charles Rose (died 1791) was an Episcopalian clergyman who served in the Scottish Episcopal Church as the Bishop of Dunblane (1774–1791) and Bishop of Dunkeld (1776–1786).

The son of James Rose, Bishop of Fife, and Euphemia Campbell, Charles was possibly educated at the University of St Andrews. Following his ordination at Dunkeld on 17 May 1745, he served as the chaplain to Lord Arbuthnott from 1745 to 1756. He was then appointed the Incumbent of Doune in 1756, a post he retained until his death. He became the Bishop of Dunblane in 1774 and was consecrated at Forfar on 24 August 1774 by bishops Falconer, Rait and Forbes. Four years later, he also became the Bishop of Dunkeld from 11 June 1776 until autumn 1786.

He successfully blocked the consecration of William Abernethy Drummond to the See of Brechin in 1781, and opposed the consecration of Samuel Seabury in 1784, due to Seabury's ordination in the juring Church of England. After the other bishops of the Scottish Episcopal Church abandoned their allegiance to the House of Stuart and recognised the House of Hanover in 1788, he irregularly consecrated James Brown to continue the non-juring succession. He was known as 'the most Jacobite of all Jacobites'.

Bishop Rose died in office in April 1791.

== Notes ==
Scottish Episcopal Church titles
| Preceded by John Alexander as administrator of Dunblane | Bishop of Dunblane; 1774–1791 | Vacant Title next held by Patrick Torry |
| Preceded by John Alexander | Bishop of Dunkeld; 1776–1786 | Vacant Title next held by Jonathan Watson |
