= William Abernethy Drummond =

Scottish physician and bishop

The Right Reverend William Abernethy Drummond
- Bishop of Edinburgh
- Church: Scottish Episcopal Church
- Elected: 1787
- In office: 1788–1805
- Predecessor: William Falconer
- Successor: Daniel Sandford
- Previous post: Bishop of Brechin (1787–1788)

Orders
- Ordination: 19 December 1744 by John Alexander
- Consecration: 26 September 1787 by Robert Kilgour

Personal details
- Born: 1719 or 1720
- Died: 27 August 1809 Hawthornden Castle, Midlothian, Scotland
- Denomination: Anglican
- Spouse: Mary Barbara Macgregor
- Children: 1
- Education: University of Edinburgh

William Abernethy Drummond (called Abernethy; 1719?–1809), was a physician who later became Bishop of Edinburgh.

== Life ==
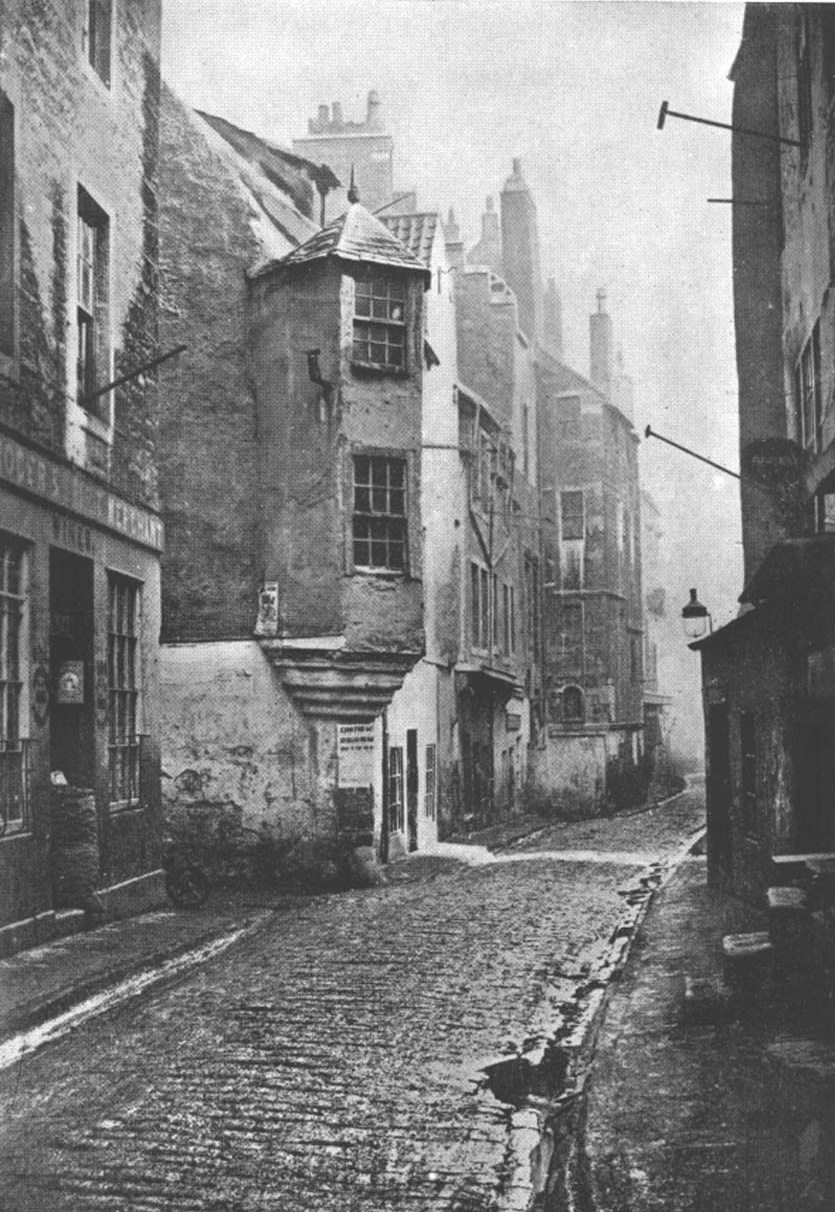
Cardinal Beaton's lodging in Edinburgh's Cowgate

Born William Abernethy in 1719 or 1720, he was descended from the family of Abernethy of Saltoun in East Lothian and from William Drummond of Hawthornden.

He first studied medicine, and took the degree of M.D., but was subsequently for many years minister of an Episcopalian church in Edinburgh. In Edinburgh he lived in the former house of Cardinal Beaton on the Cowgate.

Having paid his respects to Prince Charles Edward, when he held his court at Holyrood in 1745, he was afterwards exposed to much annoyance and even danger on that account, and was glad to avail himself of his medical degree, and wear for some years the usual professional costume of the Edinburgh physicians.

He took the additional surname of Drummond on his marriage, 3 November 1760, to Mary Barbara Drummond, widow of Robert Macgregor of Glengarnock, and daughter and heiress of William Drummond of Hawthornden, Midlothian, grandson of the poet. He lived at Hawthornden Castle near Roslin, Midlothian.

In 1784 he is listed as a physician in Edinburgh living at St Johns Hill in the South Side.

== Episcopacy ==
He was consecrated as Bishop of Brechin at Peterhead, 26 September 1787, and a few weeks later was elected to the see of Edinburgh, to which the see of Glasgow was afterwards united. About the middle of February 1788 the news reached Scotland that on 31 January of that year Prince Charles Edward had died at Rome. Drummond was the first among the bishops to urge that the time had now come for the Episcopalians to give a public proof of their submission to the House of Hanover by praying in the express words of the English liturgy for the king and royal family. This was accordingly done throughout Scotland on 25 May. A bill for the 'relief for pastors, ministers, and lay persons of the episcopal communion in Scotland' having been prepared, Drummond, along with Bishops Skinner and Strachan, set out for London in April 1789 to promote the bill's progress through Parliament.

Drummond continued Bishop of Edinburgh until 1805, when, on the union of the two classes of Episcopalians, he resigned in favour of Very Rev Dr Daniel Sandford. However, he retained his connection with the clergy in the diocese of Glasgow until his death, which took place at his residence, Hawthornden, on 27 August 1809, at the age of eighty-nine or ninety.

His wife died at Edinburgh, 11 September 1789, in her sixty-eighth year, having had an only child, a daughter, who died before her.

== Writings ==
Drummond was a good theologian and well-meaning, but, says Russel, 'his intemperate manner defeated in most cases the benevolence of his intentions, and only irritated those whom he had wished to convince.' He wrote several small tracts, among which may be mentioned: 1. 'A Dialogue between Philalethes and Benevolus: wherein M. G. H.'s defence of Transubstantiation, in the Appendix to his Scripture Doctrine of Miracles displayed, is fully examined and solidly confuted. With some Observations on his Scripture Doctrine of Miracles,’ 12mo, Edinburgh, 1776. 2. 'A Letter to the Clergy of his Diocese, 8 March 1788,’ 8vo, Edinburgh, 1788. 3. 'A Letter to the Lay Members of his Diocese, April 1788. With large notes,’ 8vo, Edinburgh, 1788. He also furnished a preface and notes to Bishop Jolly's abridgment of Charles Daubeny's 'Guide to the Church,’ 8vo, Edinburgh, 1799. His letters to Bishops Douglas and Skinner, mostly on the recognition of the Scotch episcopal church of the Hanoverian line of succession, are among the Egerton and Additional MSS, now in the British Library. Drummond presented in 1782 to the University of Edinburgh the manuscripts of William Drummond of Hawthornden [q. v.], the ancestor of his wife.

Scottish Episcopal Church titles
| Preceded by See Vacant since 1781 - last holder George Innes | Bishop of Brechin; 1787–1788 | Succeeded by John Strachan |
| Preceded by See Vacant since 1784 - last holder William Falconer | Bishop of Edinburgh; 1788-1805 | Succeeded by Daniel Sandford |
