= Scottish Prayer Book =

Scottish Prayer Book may refer to one of several liturgical books:

- The Book of Common Order, several editions of liturgical texts first produced by John Knox and authorized by the Church of Scotland and other Presbyterian groups
- The 1637 Scottish Prayer Book, an abortive effort to reintroduce Anglican worship to the Church of Scotland
- The 1912 Scottish Prayer Book, a formerly authorized liturgical text of the Episcopal Church of Scotland
- The 1929 Scottish Prayer Book, a currently authorized liturgical text of the Episcopal Church of Scotland
