= George Innes (disambiguation) =

George Innes is an actor.

George Innes or Inness may also refer to:

- George Innes (bishop) (1717–1781), Bishop of Brechin 1778–1781
- Sir George Innes, 4th Baronet (died c. 1690), of the Innes baronets
- Sir George Innes, 2nd Baronet (died c. 1715), of the Innes baronets
- George Inness (1825–1894), American landscape painter
- George Inness Jr. (1854–1926), American figure and landscape painter
- George Innes-Ker, 9th Duke of Roxburghe (1913–1974)
- George Innes (RAF officer) (1923–2015), Royal Air Force officer
