= George Innes (bishop) =

The Right Reverend George Innes
- Bishop of Brechin
- Church: Scottish Episcopal Church
- Diocese: Brechin
- In office: 1778–1781
- Predecessor: James Rait
- Successor: Abernethy Drummond

Orders
- Consecration: 13 August 1778 by William Falconer

Personal details
- Born: 1717
- Died: 18 May 1781 (aged 63–64)
- Denomination: Anglican

Styles of George Innes
- Reference style: The Right Reverend
- Spoken style: My Lord or Bishop

George Innes (1717–1781) was an Anglican clergyman who served in the Scottish Episcopal Church as the Bishop of Brechin from 1778 to 1781.

He was consecrated the Bishop of the Diocese of Brechin on 13 August 1778 at Edinburgh by Primus Falconer and bishops Rose and Petrie.

He died in office on 18 May 1781, aged 61.

Scottish Episcopal Church titles
Preceded by James Rait	Bishop of Brechin; 1778–1781	Succeeded by Abernethy Drummond
