= Scottish liturgy =

Scottish liturgy may refer to one of several topics.

- The Book of Common Order, a series of liturgical books originally devised by John Calvin and used by Presbyterians in Scotland and elsewhere
- The Scottish Prayer Book (1637), an abortive attempt to introduce the Anglican Book of Common Prayer in the Church of Scotland
- The Scottish Prayer Book (1929), a currently authorized liturgical book of the Episcopal Church of Scotland
- The liturgies used by participants in the Nonjuring schism, influenced by Anglican practices and foreign usages
- The liturgies of the Scottish Rite of Freemasonry
