= William Dunbar (bishop) =

Scottish Episcopal clergyman

Styles of William Dunbar, M.A.
- Reference style: The Right Reverend
- Spoken style: My Lord or Bishop

William Dunbar, M.A. (6 October 1661 – 7 January 1746) was a Scottish Episcopal clergyman who served as the Bishop of Moray and Ross (1727–35) and Bishop of Aberdeen (1733–1745).

He was consecrated at Edinburgh as the bishop of the dioceses of Moray and Ross on 18 June 1727 by Arthur Millar, Primus of the Scottish Episcopal Church, with bishops Gadderar and Rattray serving as co-consecrators. He also became the Bishop of the Diocese of Aberdeen on 5 June 1733, but retained Moray and Ross until 1735.

He resigned the see of Aberdeen on 4 July 1745 and died on 7 January 1746, aged 84.

Scottish Episcopal Church titles
| Vacant Title last held by William Hay | Bishop of Moray; 1727–1735 | Vacant Title next held by George Hay (bishop-elect) |
| Vacant Title last held by James Ramsay | Bishop of Ross; 1727–1735 | Succeeded by Robert Keith |
| Preceded by James Gadderar | Bishop of Aberdeen; 1733–1745 | Succeeded by Andrew Gerard |
