= Jonathan Watson (bishop) =

Anglican clergyman

Styles of Jonathan Watson
- Reference style: The Right Reverend
- Spoken style: My Lord or Bishop

Jonathan Watson (1760–1808) was an Anglican clergyman who served in the Scottish Episcopal Church as the Bishop of Dunkeld from 1792 to 1808.

== Life ==
He was born in January 1760 and undoubtedly a native of Portsoy, Banffshire. Watson was trained for holy orders in the Scottish Episcopal Church by John Skinner, Incumbent of Longside (later Bishop of Aberdeen and Primus). He was ordained at the early age of twenty-one or twenty-two (1771 or 1772). His first known pastoral appointment was the Incumbent of Blairdaff (Monymusk) and Auchindoir (1781–1786), followed by the Incumbent of Banff and Portsoy (1786–1791), and then the Incumbent of Laurencekirk (1791–1808); the last appointment he held until his death.

Watson was elected Bishop of Dunkeld in 1792 and consecrated at Stonehaven on 20 September 1792 by John Skinner, Primus of the Scottish Episcopal Church, Andrew Macfarlane, Bishop of Moray and Ross, and John Strachan, Bishop of Brechin.

He died in office at Laurencekirk on 28 June 1808, aged 48, and was buried at St Laurence's Episcopal Churchyard, Laurencekirk on 5 July 1808.

== Family ==
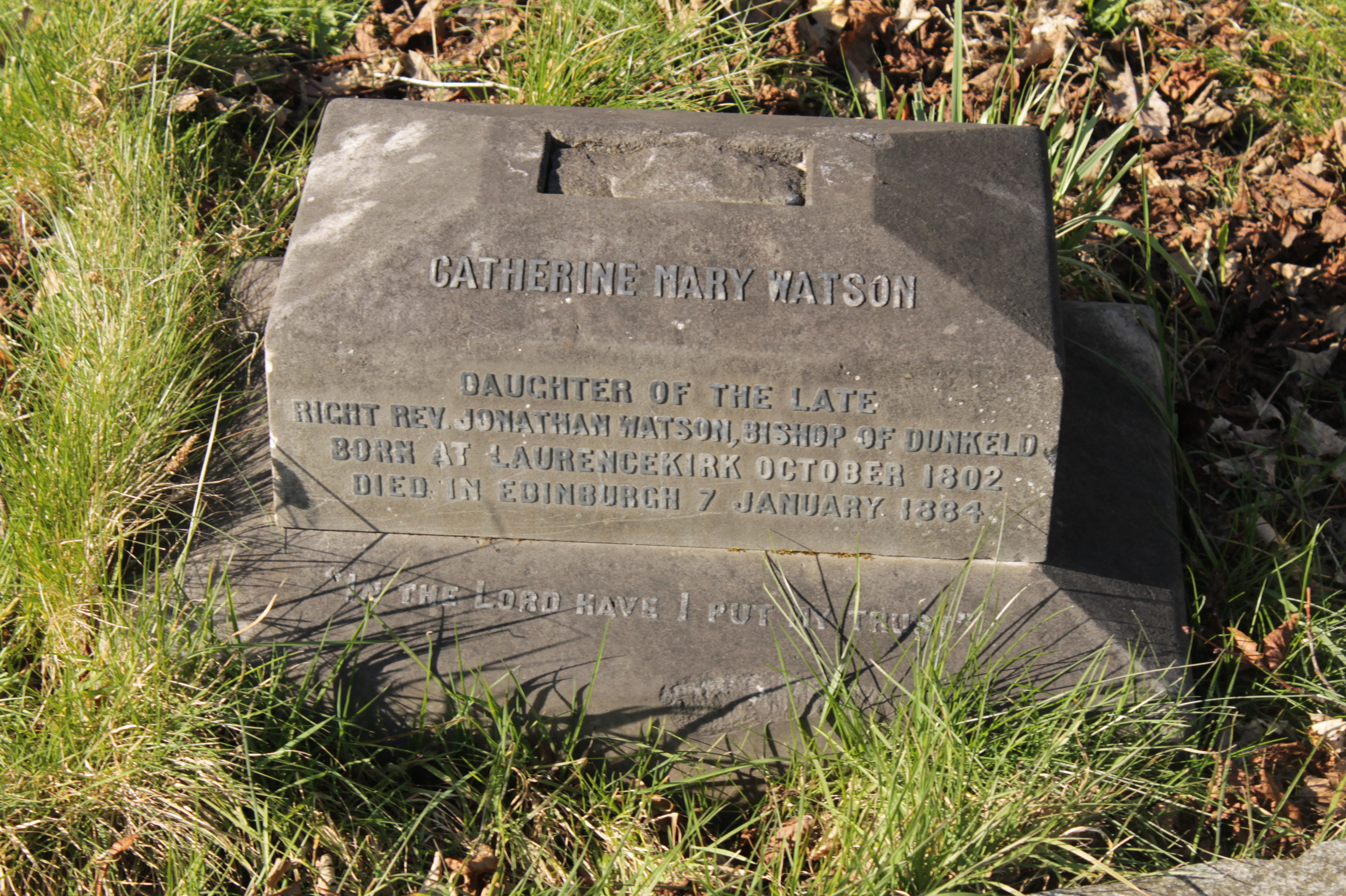
The grave of Catherine Mary Watson, Warriston Cemetery

He married Catherine Margaret Edgar (1763–1845), daughter of John Edgar, Laird of Keithock, near Brechin, and they had two children: Catherine Mary (12 October 1802 – 8 January 1884) and John (born 1805 – died 1840 at sea).

== Bibliography ==
- Bertie, David M. (2000). Scottish Episcopal Clergy, 1689–2000. Edinburgh: T & T Clark. ISBN 0567087468.
- Farquhar, George T. S. (1915). Three Bishops of Dunkeld: Alexander, Rose and Watson. Selkirk: The Scottish Chronicle.
- Keith, Robert (1824). Russel, Michael (ed.). An Historical Catalogue of the Scottish Bishops: Down To The Year 1688. Edinburgh: Printed for Bell and Bradfute.
- Skinner, John (1818). Annals of Scottish Episcopacy. Aberbeen: A. Brown & Co.

Scottish Episcopal Church titles
Preceded by See vacant preceded by Charles Rose	Bishop of Dunkeld; 1792–1808	Succeeded by Patrick Torry
