= Robert Kilgour =

Scottish Anglican minister

The Right Reverend Robert Kilgour M.A.
- Primus of the Scottish Episcopal Church
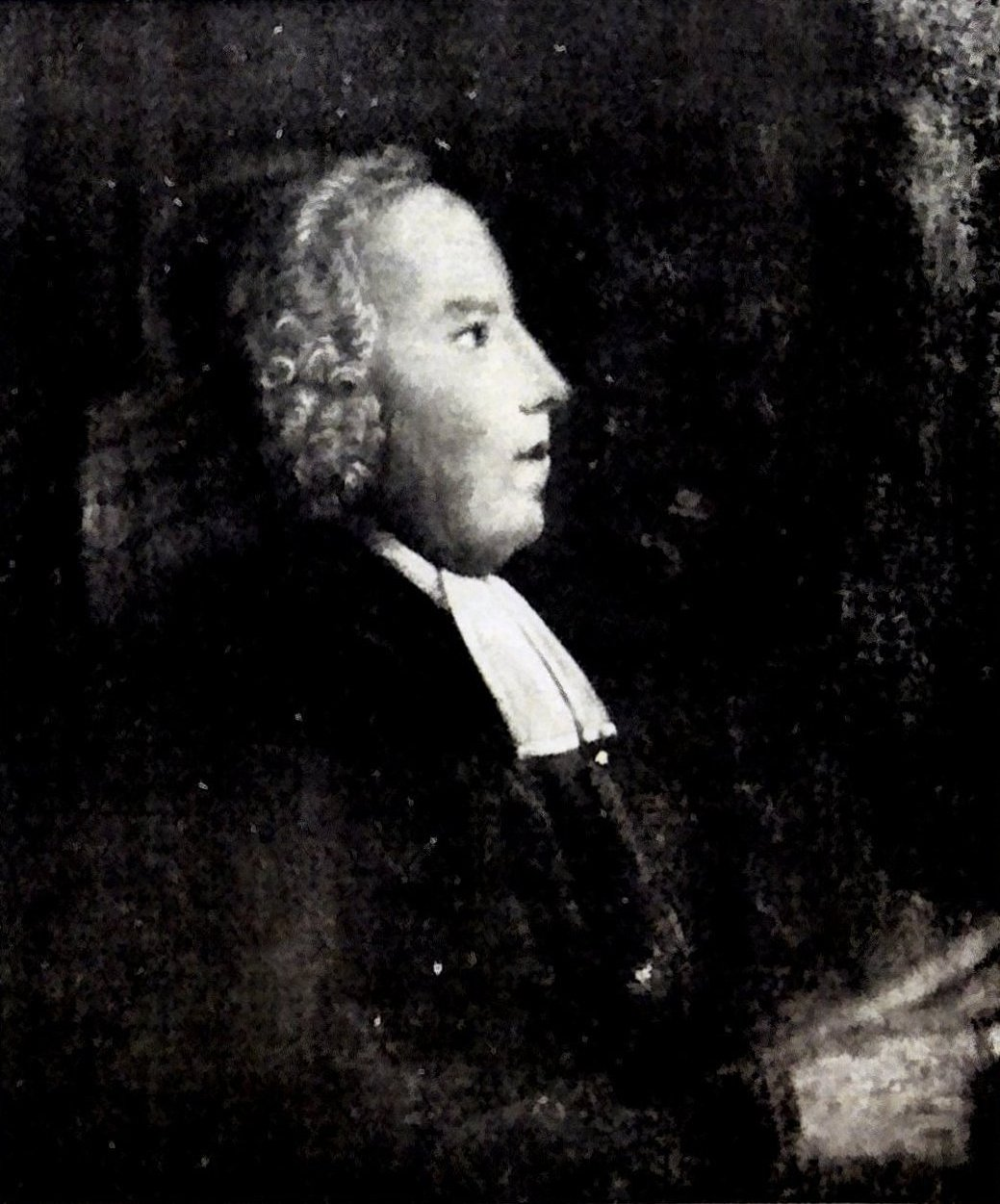
- Robert Kilgour
- Province: Scotland
- Elected: 1782
- Term ended: 1788
- Predecessor: William Falconer
- Successor: John Skinner
- Other posts: Bishop of Aberdeen (1768–1786), Incumbent of Peterhead (1737–1789)

Orders
- Ordination: 1737 (Deacon), 25 April 1738 (Priest)
- Consecration: 21 September 1768 (Bishop) by William Falconer

Personal details
- Born: 1714 Waulkmill, Cruden, Aberdeenshire
- Died: 23 March 1790 (aged 76) Peterhead, Aberdeenshire
- Buried: Peterhead, Aberdeenshire
- Parents: Robert Kilgour and Isobel Barron
- Spouse: Margaret Arbuthnot
- Children: five daughters

Robert Kilgour (1714–1790) was a Scottish clergyman who served in the Scottish Episcopal Church as Bishop of Aberdeen from 1768 to 1786 and Primus of the Scottish Episcopal Church from 1782 to 1788. He was an outspoken supporter of the Jacobite cause.

== Early life and ministry ==
He was born at Waulkmill, Cruden, Aberdeenshire, and baptised there on 15 March 1714, the son of Robert Kilgour and Isobel Barron. He was educated at King's College, Aberdeen from 1729 to 1733; graduating with a Master of Arts degree on 29 March 1733. He was ordained deacon in 1737 and presbyter at Aberdeen on 25 April 1738. He was appointed the Episcopal Incumbent of Peterhead in 1737. In 1758, he married Margaret Arbuthnot (1721–1805), and they had five daughters. One of their daughters, Christian, married Patrick Torry (later Bishop of St Andrews, Dunkeld and Dunblane) in 1787.

== Episcopal career ==
He was consecrated as Bishop of Aberdeen on 21 September 1768 by William Falconer, Primus of the Scottish Episcopal Church, James Rait, Bishop of Brechin, and John Alexander, Bishop of Dunkeld. Fourteen years later, Kilgour also became the Primus of the Scottish Episcopal Church on 25 September 1782.

Along with bishops Arthur Petrie and John Skinner, Kilgour consecrated Samuel Seabury, an American Episcopal priest, as a bishop on 14 November 1784.

He resigned as Bishop of Aberdeen in 1786, and as Primus in 1788, both post were succeeded by his Coadjutor, John Skinner. In 1789, he resigned as Incumbent of Peterhead and was succeeded by his son-in-law, Patrick Torry.

He died at Peterhead on 23 March 1790, aged 76.

== Bibliography ==
- Bertie, David M. (2000). Scottish Episcopal Clergy, 1689-2000. Edinburgh: T & T Clark. ISBN 0-567-08746-8.

Scottish Episcopal Church titles
Preceded by Alexander Hepburn	Incumbent of Peterhead; 1737–1789	Succeeded by Patrick Torry
Preceded by Andrew Gerard	Bishop of Aberdeen; 1768–1786	Succeeded by John Skinner
Preceded by William Falconer	Primus of the Scottish Episcopal Church; 1782–1788	Succeeded by John Skinner
