= Hawthornden Castle =

Castle in Midlothian, Scotland

Coordinates: 55.86119°N 3.14070°W

- Midlothian, Scotland
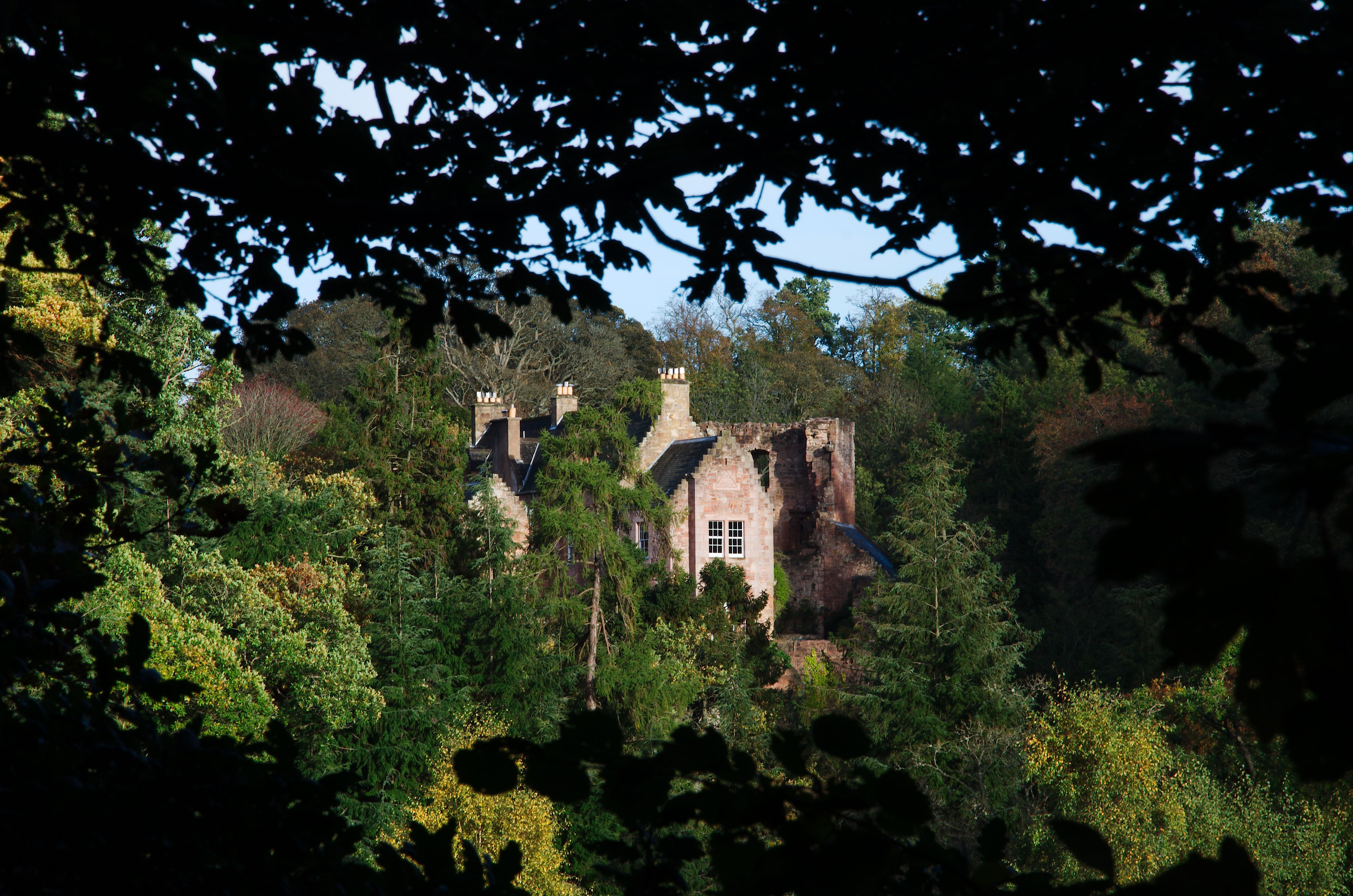

Site history
- Built: 15th - 17th century
- Built by: Douglas family Sir William Drummond of Hawthornden
- Materials: Pink sandstone rubble with ashlar dressings

Hawthornden Castle is located on the River North Esk in Midlothian, Scotland. The castle lies a mile to the east of Roslin at grid reference NT287637, and is just downstream from Roslin Castle. Hawthornden comprises a 15th-century ruin, with a 17th-century L-plan house attached. The house has been restored and now serves as a writer's retreat. Man-made caves in the rock beneath the castle have been in use for much longer than the castle itself.

== History ==
Hawthornden was a property of the Abernethy family from the 13th century, and passed to the Douglases in the 14th century. The earliest parts of the castle date from the 15th century, and include a large three-storey tower, and the south curtain wall of a triangular courtyard. The castle was sacked twice by the Earl of Hertford in 1544 and 1547 during The Rough Wooing.

In 1540 John Douglas sold trees from Hawthornden wood to James V as timber for his ships. The castle was later sold to Sir John Drummond, one of King James VI's ushers. His son, the poet Sir William Drummond of Hawthornden, was born here, and he later extended the castle. The L-shaped north range is his work, dated 1638, and probably replaced earlier buildings on this side of the courtyard. He was visited here in 1618 by English poet Ben Jonson. In the following century Dr Johnson visited Hawthornden.

This house has been much altered, including a major modernisation of the mid-19th century. The arms of the Abernethy family were installed above a door in 1795, by Dr William Abernethy Drummond, Bishop of Edinburgh. The bishop also added a memorial in honour of his ancestors Sir William Drummond and Sir Lawrence Abernethy of Hawthornden.

Hawthornden Castle was owned by the Drummond dynasty until the early 1970s. It was left to the butler when the last Drummond died, then sold to Douglas Adamson, a well known and respected fine art and antiques dealer from Edinburgh, and his family, who turned it back into a home. The house was also open to the public. The Adamson family lived there until the mid-1980s when Douglas Adamson died.

The Castle was then sold to Drue Heinz, the widow of H. J. Heinz II. Architects Simpson and Brown undertook a restoration of the castle in the 1980s. Heinz, a patron of the arts, made it into a place for writers to peacefully live and work, called the Hawthornden Literary Retreat. Recent restoration work has used reclaimed stone available from the demolished Caledonian Railway station in Edinburgh.

The castle and caves are a Category A listed building.

== Architecture ==
The castle comprises a roughly triangular courtyard, approximately 24m long and 12m at its widest point, projecting north-west along a rocky promontory on the south bank of the River Esk. The 15th-century tower is situated at the south-east corner. Around 8m square, the tower is ruined, although the recent renovation included the installation of a library in the tower basement. There is also a rib-vaulted pit prison beneath the tower. Windows on the south curtain wall show that a range of buildings once stood here, although these are now all gone. A well in the west end of the courtyard supplied the castle's water.

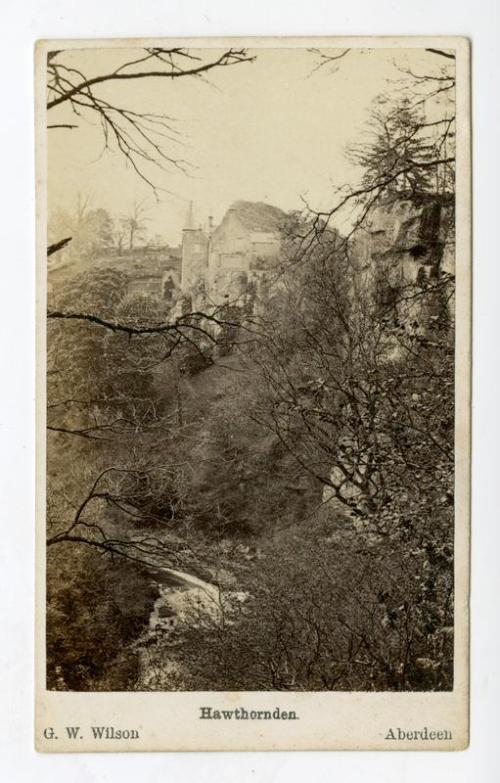
Hawthornden Castle - photographic print

The 16th century range is to the north, and is linked to the tower by a 16th-century wall, in which is the entrance. The range is of three storeys and an attic, and was originally harled. The renaissance-style doorway is of later date, as is the iron knocker with the initials of Sir William Drummond (the son of the poet) and his wife, Dame Barbara Scott. There are three gunports around the doorway, with a fourth in the tower. The last addition to the castle was a single-storey range to the west, built in the late 18th or early 19th century.

== Caves ==
There are a number of man-made caves in the cliffs beneath the castle. One cave serves as a doocot, with 370 compartments. There is a tradition that King Robert the Bruce and Sir Alexander Ramsay of Dalhousie once found shelter in the caves underneath it.

Another cave nearby is known as Wallace's Cave, after William Wallace.
