= Patrick Torry =

The Right Reverend Patrick Torry
- Bishop of St Andrews, Dunkeld and Dunblane
- Church: Scottish Episcopal Church
- Diocese: St Andrews, Dunkeld and Dunblane
- In office: 1844-1852
- Successor: Charles Wordsworth
- Previous post: Bishops of Fife, Dunkeld and Dunblane (1837-1844)

Orders
- Ordination: 1783
- Consecration: 12 October 1808 by William Skinner

Personal details
- Born: 27 December 1763 King Edward, Aberdeenshire, Scotland
- Died: 3 October 1852 (aged 88) Peterhead, Aberdeenshire, Scotland
- Buried: St Ninian's Cathedral, Perth
- Denomination: Anglican
- Parents: Thomas Torry & Jane Watson
- Spouse: Christian Kilgour (1787-1789); Jane Young (m.1791)
- Children: 6

Styles of Patrick Torry
- Reference style: The Right Reverend
- Spoken style: My Lord or Bishop

Patrick Torry (1763–1852) was a Scottish Anglican bishop who served as a bishop in the Scottish Episcopal Church during the first half of the 19th century.

== Early life and family ==
He was born in King Edward, Aberdeenshire on 27 December 1763, son of Thomas Torry and Jane Watson. He married twice, firstly in 1787 to Christian Kilgour (died 11 May 1789), daughter of the Rt Revd Robert Kilgour, Bishop of Aberdeen, and secondly in September 1791 to Jane Young, daughter of William Young and Ann Gordon. He had three sons and three daughters. His eldest son, John Torry (1800–1879), was incumbent of Coupar Angus and Dean of St Andrews, Dunkeld and Dunblane.

== Ecclesiastical career ==
He was ordained in the Anglican ministry as a deacon in 1782 and a priest in 1783. His first pastoral appointment was as the incumbent at Arradoul and Fochabers from 1782 to 1789, followed by incumbent at Peterhead from 1789 to June 1837.

He was consecrated as Bishop of Dunkeld and Dunblane at Aberdeen on 12 October 1808 by Primus Skinner, with bishops Macfarlane and Jolly serving as co-consecrators. His united sees were merged with the bishopric of Fife in 1837, with the combined episcopal title was renamed to Bishop of St Andrews, Dunkeld and Dunblane in 1844.

With assistance of the Reverend Alexander Lendrum, Incumbent of Muthill, he produced a Scottish Prayer Book in 1851 which was censured by the College of Bishops of the Scottish Episcopal Church.

He died in office at Peterhead on 3 October 1852, aged 88, and was buried at St Ninian's Cathedral, Perth.

== Bibliography ==
- Bertie, David M. (2000). Scottish Episcopal Clergy, 1689-2000. Edinburgh: T & T Clark. ISBN 0567087468.

Scottish Episcopal Church titles
Preceded by Jonathan Watson (Bishop of Dunkeld)	Bishop of Dunkeld and Dunblane; 1808–1837	The two sees united with Fife
Preceded by Charles Rose (Bishop of Dunblane)	Bishop of Dunkeld and Dunblane; 1808–1837	The two sees united with Fife
New title	Bishop of Fife, Dunkeld and Dunblane; 1837–1844	Title renamed
New title	Bishop of St Andrews, Dunkeld and Dunblane; 1844–1852	Succeeded by Charles Wordsworth
