= Sentence (liturgy) =

Short biblical passage recited in Anglican liturgy

A sentence, particularly in Anglican services, is a short passage from the Bible that is recited in Christian liturgies. For example, with the Church of England's currently authorized 1662 Book of Common Prayer, sentences are used at several points within different rites: prescribed sentences are to be recited before Morning and Evening Prayers, at least one sentence may be said or sung during the Holy Communion office offertory, and sentences appear at multiple points during the burial service.

== Description ==
Sentences are short passages taken from the Bible that are recited within Christian liturgies. "Opening sentences" sometimes appear in a rite to introduce it or provide commentary upon what is occurring within that act of worship. Sentences can also serves to ground an act of worship in a seasonal context.

== History ==
Opening sentences were introduced to Anglican liturgy within the Morning and Evening Prayers of the Church of England's 1552 Book of Common Prayer. Penitential in nature, the 1552 sentences preceded the confession of sin in both the Morning and Evening Prayers. Sentences came to have additional purposes in later revisions of the Book of Common Prayer. During the Elizabethan era, celebration of the 1559 prayer book's Holy Communion office included use of scriptural passages, both those specifically established as sentences and those unofficially selected for their seasonal or contextual relevance. Following the sentences at the offertory, organists were generally permitted to perform solo.

Lancelot Andrewes introduced his "Peculiar Sentences" during the 16th century. These sentences were part of a broader high church effort to restore oblationary language into the Holy Communion liturgy that had been deleted in the 1552 prayer book. The abortive 1637 Scottish Prayer Book was the first Anglican liturgical book to reintroduce oblationary language, utilizing six of Andrewes's "Peculiar Sentences". All 20 sentences present within the contemporary English prayer book had been targeted for removal within the 1637 prayer book, but ultimately William Laud successfully lobbied for the removal of only ten (including those from the Book of Tobit, part of the biblical apocrypha).

The 1662 Book of Common Prayer prescribes sentences to be recited before Morning and Evening Prayers. During the Holy Communion office's offertory, at least one sentence may be said or sung. Within the burial service, three sentences preface the rite and others are provisioned for the committal.
