= John Ochterlony =

The Right Reverend John Ochterlony MA
- Bishop of Brechin
- Church: Scottish Episcopal Church
- Diocese: Brechin
- Elected: 1731
- In office: 1731-1742
- Predecessor: Thomas Rattray
- Successor: James Rait

Orders
- Consecration: 4 June 1727 by David Freebairn

Personal details
- Born: 1667
- Died: 1742 (aged 74–75)
- Denomination: Anglican

Styles of John Ochterlony, MA
- Reference style: The Right Reverend
- Spoken style: My Lord or Bishop

John Ochterlony, MA (1667–1742) was an Anglican clergyman who served in the Scottish Episcopal Church as the Bishop of Brechin from 1731 to 1742.

== Biography ==
He was consecrated a college bishop in the Scottish Episcopal Church on 4 June 1727 at Edinburgh by bishops Freebairn, Cant and Duncan. He was appointed the Bishop of the Diocese of Brechin in December 1731. He died in office in May 1742, aged 75.

Scottish Episcopal Church titles
Preceded by Thomas Rattray	Bishop of Brechin; 1731–1742	Succeeded by James Rait
