= Robert Forbes (bishop) =

Scottish Non-juring Anglican bishop

The Right Reverend Robert Forbes
- Bishop of Ross and Caithness
- Church: Scottish Episcopal Church
- In office: 1762 to 1775

Orders
- Ordination: 1735 by David Freebairn
- Consecration: 24 June 1762 by William Falconer

Personal details
- Born: 1708
- Died: 1775 (aged 66–67)
- Denomination: Episcopalian

Robert Forbes (1708–1775) was a Scottish historian and bishop of the Non-juring Scottish Episcopal Church. John Lorne Campbell has described Forbes as, "an Episcopalian clergyman and ardent Jacobite who later became bishop of Ross and Caithness, and who made it his life's work to collect all the reminiscences of participants in the 1745-6 rising as he could". Historian John S. Gibson wrote, that the discovery of Forbes' research bound together into ten volumes in the library of a Scottish country house during the 1830s was, "alas, just too late for Sir Walter Scott". His oral history collection was ultimately published posthumously in three volumes by the Scottish History Society as The Lyon in Mourning between 1895 and 1896 and became, according to John Lorne Campbell, "probably their most popular publication".

== Life ==
Forbes was born in 1708 at Old Rayne, Aberdeenshire, where his father was schoolmaster. He was educated at Marischal College, Aberdeen (A.M. 1726). In 1735 he went to Edinburgh, was ordained priest by Bishop David Freebairn, and was shortly appointed minister of the non-jurant episcopal congregation at Leith, a town which was to remain his home for the rest of his life. In his room there, in 1740, the poet John Skinner received baptism at his hands.

On 7 September 1745, when Charles Edward Stuart was on his descent from the Highlands, Forbes was one of three episcopal clergymen who were arrested at St. Ninians, near Stirling, suspected of intending to join the Jacobite Army. Forbes was confined in Stirling Castle till 4 February 1746, and in Edinburgh Castle until 29 May.

In 1762 the episcopal clergy of Ross and Caithness elected him their bishop, and he was consecrated at Forfar on 24 June by the Primus of the Scottish Episcopal Church, William Falconer, with bishops Andrew Gerard and Alexander. He continued to live at Leith, but made two visitations of his northern flock in 1762 and 1770. In 1764 he had a new church built for him, where he gathered a good congregation; but he would not ‘qualify’ according to law, and he was soon reported to government. Soldiers were sent to his meeting to see whether he prayed for King George III, and he was summoned before the colonel-commanding (Dalrymple). An account of the interview that ensued is preserved in his third journal. He made no submission, but thought it better to have his services without singing; and, receiving advice from a friend, he went for some weeks to London. There he worshipped with the remnant of the nonjurors, and received from their bishop Robert Gordon a staff that had once belonged to George Hickes. In 1769 he was at a meeting of Jacobites at Moffat, when proposals were discussed for the continuance of the Stuart line and the Stuart pretensions by marrying Charles Edward to a Protestant.

On the death of Gerard, Forbes was elected bishop of Aberdeen and Orkney in 1765, but difficulties arose and he declined the appointment.

Forbes died at Leith 18 November 1775, and was buried in the Maltman's aisle of South Leith Parish Church. Two years later, the Scottish Episcopal Church formally renounced Jacobitism in favour of allegiance to the House of Hanover.

== Personal life ==
Forbes was twice married. His first wife was Agnes Gairey, whom he married in 1749 and who died the following year. His second wife was Rachel Houston, daughter of Ludovick Houston of Johnstone; she was as enthusiastic a Jacobite as her husband, and frequent mention is made of her in The Lyon in Mourning. The bishop permitted favoured guests to drink out of Prince Charlie's brogues; Rachel sent to the ‘royal exile’ the seed-cake which Oliphant of Gask presented to him.

== Works ==
Forbes began about 1760 to write in the Edinburgh Magazine, his articles being chiefly topographical and antiquarian. He took part in updating the communion office of the Scottish Episcopal Church, the editions of 1763, 1764, and 1765 being printed under his supervision. The Journals of his episcopal visitations were edited in 1886 by James Brown Craven.

In the bishop's own lifetime appeared An Essay on Christian Burial, and the Respect due to Burying-Grounds, by a ‘Ruling Elder of the Church of Scotland’ (1765), and an Account of the Chapel of Roslin (1774).

His major contribution to history is the ‘Lyon in Mourning,’ ten octavo volumes in manuscript, bound in black, and consisting of highly important primary sources related to the Jacobite Rising of 1745 and Hanoverian atrocities during its aftermath.

The volumes date from 1747 to 1775; the first extracts were published (1834) under the title of Jacobite Memoirs, by Robert Chambers, from the originals in the Advocates' Library, Edinburgh. A complete edition appeared in 1895: The Lyon in Mourning, edited by Henry Paton, Scottish History Society, Edinburgh.

These accounts were bound with up a number of relics of the same expedition. Among those Forbes interviewed in detail for the project was the Scottish Gaelic national poet and former Jacobite military officer Alasdair MacMhaighstir Alasdair, whose name is rendered as "Captain Alexander MacDonald". Another important source was a former staff officer to Prince Charles Edward Stuart; Captain Félix O'Neille y O'Neille, a member of the Gaelic nobility of Ireland from Creggan, County Armagh.

According to historian John Sibbald Gibson, an especially valuable source to Forbes about the rising and its aftermath was Rev. Dr. John Cameron of Fort William, a nonjuring and unregistered Presbyterian minister at a time when many Protestants in Lochaber felt an intense hostility towards every ministeir na cuigse ("Whig minister"). Cameron was also a former military chaplain to the Clan Cameron regiment of the Jacobite Army, and provided Forbes with what is believed to be an eyewitness account of how Donald Cameron of Lochiel was brought down by enemy fire and carried off the field by his clansmen during the Battle of Culloden.

According to historian Maggie Craig, Forbes' history has come in for criticism in recent decades. Academic historians have accused him of bias towards Jacobitism, while some negationist historians have accused Forbes of creating and peddling atrocity propaganda. It speaks to Forbes' credibility, according to Craig, that, "The Lyon contains searing accounts of cruelties perpetrated by Government troops and commanders, but where credit is due to them for restraint and kindness, Bishop Forbes is always scrupulous to give it."

According to historian Bruce Gordon Seton, one might also be easily forgiven for feeling sceptical about the "lurid" accounts collected by Forbes from Jacobite prison hulk survivors, but these accounts are fully confirmed by Whig eyewitnesses and multiple primary sources in the British State Papers, such as the ship inspection reports of surgeon Dr. Minshaw.

This, according to Craig, is because, as Forbes wrote himself, "I love truth, let who will be either justified or condemned by it. I would not wish to advance a falsehood upon any subject, not even on Cumberland himself, for any consideration whatsoever."
