= Robert White (bishop) =

Scottish minister

The Most Reverend Robert White
- Bishop of Fife; Primus of the Scottish Episcopal Church
- Church: Scottish Episcopal Church
- Diocese: Fife
- Elected: 1743
- In office: 1743-1761
- Predecessor: Robert Keith
- Successor: Henry Edgar
- Other post: Primus of the Scottish Episcopal Church (1757-1761)

Orders
- Consecration: 24 June 1735 by Thomas Rattray

Personal details
- Died: 16 August 1761
- Denomination: Anglican

Styles of Robert White
- Reference style: The Most Reverend
- Spoken style: Your Grace

Robert White (died 1761) was a Scottish minister who served as the Bishop of Dunblane (1735–43), Bishop of Fife (1743–61) and Primus of the Scottish Episcopal Church (1757–61).

He was the son of Charles White, a Dundee merchant, and Susanna Douglas, daughter of the Right Reverend Robert Douglas, Bishop of Dunblane. After his education at the University of Oxford, he was ordained sometime between 1709 and 1716. His first pastoral appointment was as the Incumbent of Essie, Glamis (c. 1716–32). His next two appointments were as Curate (1732–33) and then Incumbent (1733–61) of Cupar.

In 1735, he was chosen to be the Bishop of Dunblane, but David Freebairn, Primus of the Church, refused to confirm the election. Despite this, he was consecrated at Carsebank, Forfar on 24 June 1735 by bishops Thomas Rattray, William Dunbar and Robert Keith. He was translated to the bishopric of Fife on 26 October 1743. He was also elected Primus of the Scottish Episcopal Church in 1757.

He died in office on 16 August 1761.

== Bibliography ==
- Bertie, David M. (2000). Scottish Episcopal Clergy, 1689–2000. Edinburgh: T & T Clark. ISBN 0567087468.
- Keith, Robert (1824). Russel, Michael (ed.). An Historical Catalogue of the Scottish Bishops: Down To The Year 1688. Edinburgh: Printed for Bell and Bradfute.

Scottish Episcopal Church titles
Preceded by John Gillan	Bishop of Dunblane; 1735–1743	Succeeded by John Alexander (administrator)
Preceded by Robert Keith	Bishop of Fife; 1743–1761	Succeeded by Henry Edgar
Preceded by Robert Keith	Primus of the Scottish Episcopal Church; 1757–1761	Succeeded by William Falconer
