= John Hamilton of Blair =

John Hamilton of Blair (c. 1638–1690) was a 17th-century Church of Scotland minister and bishop. He was a descendant of John Hamilton, Archbishop of St Andrews.

== Life ==
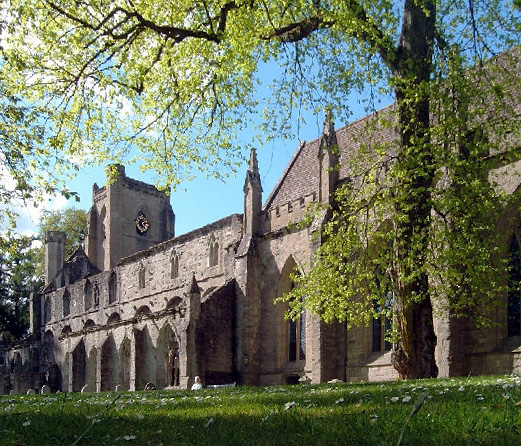
Dunkeld Cathedral

He was born the son of John Hamilton of Blair in Fife and his wife Barbara Elphinstone, daughter of James Elphinstone, Lord Balmerino. He studied at St Andrews University graduating MA in 1653. He was in June 1660 made a "regent" lecturing at St Leonard's College, St Andrews.

He was initially briefly minister of Cramond Kirk, being appointed in July 1663. From September 1663 he was minister of South Leith Parish Church, assisted from 1671 by Andrew Cant. In 1681 he was translated from South Leith Parish Church to Tolbooth Parish, one of the four congregations contained within St Giles Cathedral.

He was created Bishop of Dunkeld on 19 October 1686, his position in St Giles being filled by William Gardyne.

He was Bishop of Dunkeld until the Glorious Revolution brought an end to the Restoration Episcopate of the Scottish church in 1688. After 1688, he was a minister in Edinburgh and Sub-Dean of the Chapel Royal. He died in Edinburgh in 1690.

== Family ==
He married twice: firstly to Magdalene Halyburton, daughter of Alexander Halyburton of Innerleith; secondly to Elizabeth Urry, daughter of Sir John Urry one of Montrose's generals.

Religious titles
Preceded by Andrew Bruce	Bishop of Dunkeld; 1686–1688 (1690)	Succeeded by Thomas Rattray
