= William Drummond of Hawthornden =

Scottish poet (1585-1649)

William Drummond
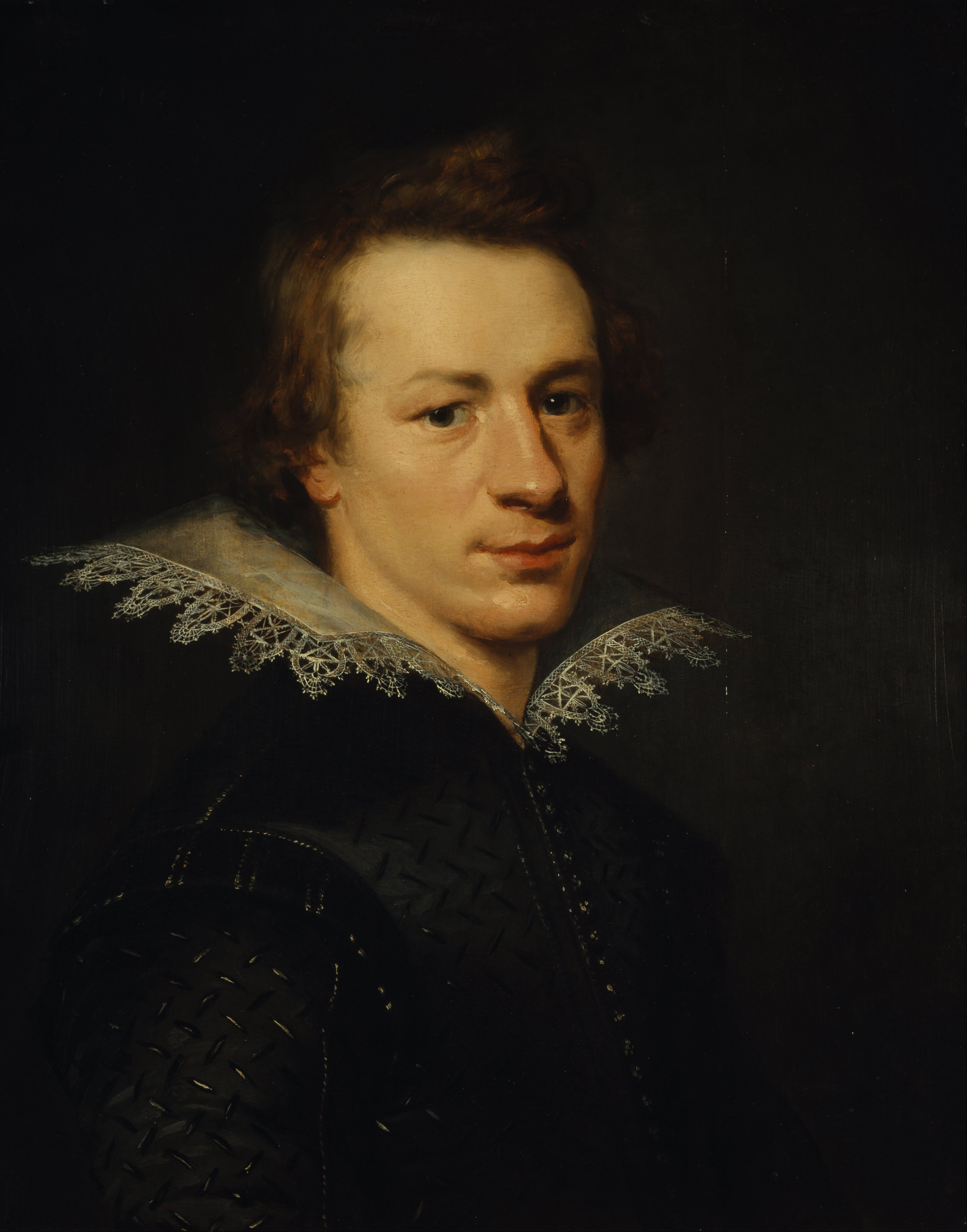
- Portrait by Abraham van Blijenberch, 1612
- Born: 13 December 1585; Hawthornden Castle, Midlothian, Scotland
- Died: 4 December 1649 (aged 63); Hawthornden Castle, Midlothian, Scotland
- Education: University of Edinburgh
- Writing career
- Genre: Poetry

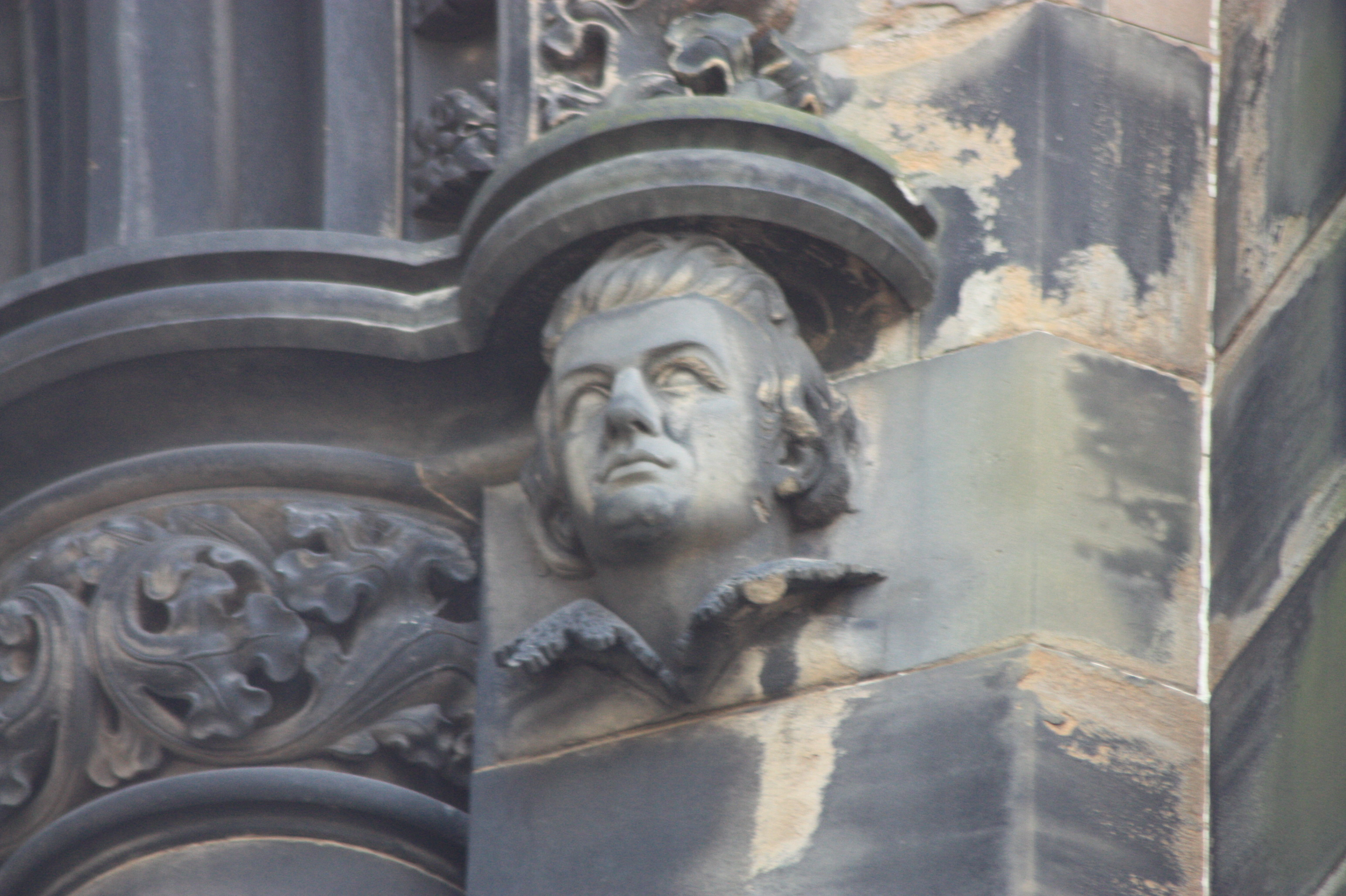
William Drummond of Hawthornden as appearing on the Scott Monument

William Drummond (13 December 1585 – 4 December 1649), called "of Hawthornden", was a Scottish poet.

== Life ==
Drummond was born at Hawthornden Castle, Midlothian, to John Drummond, the first laird of Hawthornden, and Susannah Fowler, sister of the poet and courtier William Fowler and daughter of Janet Fockart. Sir Robert Drummond of Carnock, one-time Master of Work to the Crown of Scotland, was his grandfather.

Drummond received his early education at the Royal High School of Edinburgh, and graduated in July 1605 as an M.A. of the recently founded University of Edinburgh. His father was a gentleman usher at the English court (as he had been at the Scottish court from 1590) and William, at court in 1606, describes festivities planned at Greenwich Palace in connection with the visit of King Christian IV of Denmark. Drummond spent two years at Bourges and Paris in the study of law; and, in 1609, he was again in Scotland, where, by the death of his father in the following year, he became laird of Hawthornden at the early age of 24.

The list of books he read up to this time is preserved in his own handwriting. It indicates a strong preference for imaginative literature, and shows that he was keenly interested in contemporary verse. His collection (now in the library of the University of Edinburgh) contains many first editions of the most famous productions of the age. On finding himself his own master, Drummond naturally abandoned law for the muses; "for," says his biographer in 1711, "the delicacy of his wit always run on the pleasantness and usefulness of history, and on the fame and softness of poetry". In 1612 began his correspondence with Sir William Alexander of Menstrie, afterwards Earl of Stirling, which ripened into a lifelong friendship after Drummond's visit to Menstrie in 1614.

Drummond's first publication appeared in 1613, an elegy on the death of Henry, Prince of Wales, called Teares on the Death of Meliades (Moeliades, 3rd edit. 1614). The poem shows the influence of Spenser's and Sidney's pastoralism. In the same year, he published an anthology of the elegies of Chapman, Wither and others, entitled Mausoleum, or The Choisest Flowres of the Epitaphs. In 1616, the year of Shakespeare's death, appeared Poems: Amorous, Funerall, Divine, Pastorall: in Sonnets, Songs, Sextains, Madrigals, which for several centuries was thought to commemorate Drummond's love for a fiancée who died young, a certain Cunningham of Barns, but the story is now considered unlikely, considering that Cunningham died in July 1616 and that Drummond omitted any reference to her when he compiled a list of important dates in his life many years later.

The poems bear marks of a close study of Sidney, and of the Italian poets. He sometimes translates directly from the Italian, especially from Giambattista Marino. Forth Feasting: A Panegyricke to the King's Most Excellent Majestie (1617), a poem written in heroic couplets of remarkable facility, celebrates James's visit to Scotland in that year. In 1618 Drummond began a correspondence with Michael Drayton. The two poets continued to write at intervals for thirteen years, the last letter being dated in the year of Drayton's death. The latter had almost been persuaded by his "dear Drummond" to print the later books of Poly-Olbion at Hart's Edinburgh press. In the winter of 1618–1619, Drummond had included Ben Jonson in his circle of literary friends, and at Christmas 1618 was honoured with a visit of a fortnight or more from the dramatist.

The account of their conversations, long supposed to be lost, was discovered in the Advocates' Library, Edinburgh, by David Laing, and was edited for the Shakespeare Society in 1842 and printed by Gifford & Cunningham. The conversations are full of literary gossip, and embody Jonson's opinion of himself and of his host, whom he frankly told that "his verses were too much of the schooles, and were not after the fancie of the time," and again that he "was too good and simple, and that oft a man's modestie made a fool of his witt". But the publication of what was obviously intended as a private journal has given Jonson an undeserved reputation for very harsh literary judgements, and has cast blame on Drummond for blackening his guest's memory.

In 1623 appeared the poet's fourth publication, entitled Flowers of Sion: By William Drummond of Hawthornedenne: to which is adjoyned his Cypresse Grove. From 1625 till 1630 Drummond was probably for the most part engaged in travelling on the Continent. On 29 September 1626 he received sixteen patents for diverse devices, mainly military. These included Glasses of Archimedes which could set ships afire at sea and an early form of machine gun "in which a number of musket barrels are fastened together in such a manner as to allow one man to take the place of a hundred musketeers in battle. However, there is no evidence that he actually produced any of these devices. In 1627, however, he seems to have been home for a short time, as, in that year, he appears in the entirely new character of the holder of a patent for the construction of military machines, entitled "Litera Magistri Gulielmi Drummond de Fabrica Machinarum Militarium, Anno 1627".

In 1630 Drummond again began to reside permanently at Hawthornden, and in 1632 he married Elizabeth Logan, by whom he had five sons and four daughters. In 1633 Charles made his coronation visit to Scotland; and Drummond's pen was employed in writing congratulatory speeches and verses. He was involved in organising the King's triumphal procession through Edinburgh. As Drummond preferred High Church Episcopalianism to Presbyterianism, and was an extremely loyal subject, he supported King Charles's policy of spreading Laudianism, though he protested against some of the methods employed to enforce it. When Lord Balmerino was put on trial for the capital offence of retaining in his possession a petition regarded as a libel against the King, Drummond in an energetic "Letter" (1635) urged the injustice and folly of the proceedings. About this time a claim by the earl of Menteith to the earldom of Strathearn, which was based on the assertion that King Robert III, husband of Annabella Drummond, was illegitimate, roused the poet's pride of blood and prompted him to prepare a historical defence of his house.

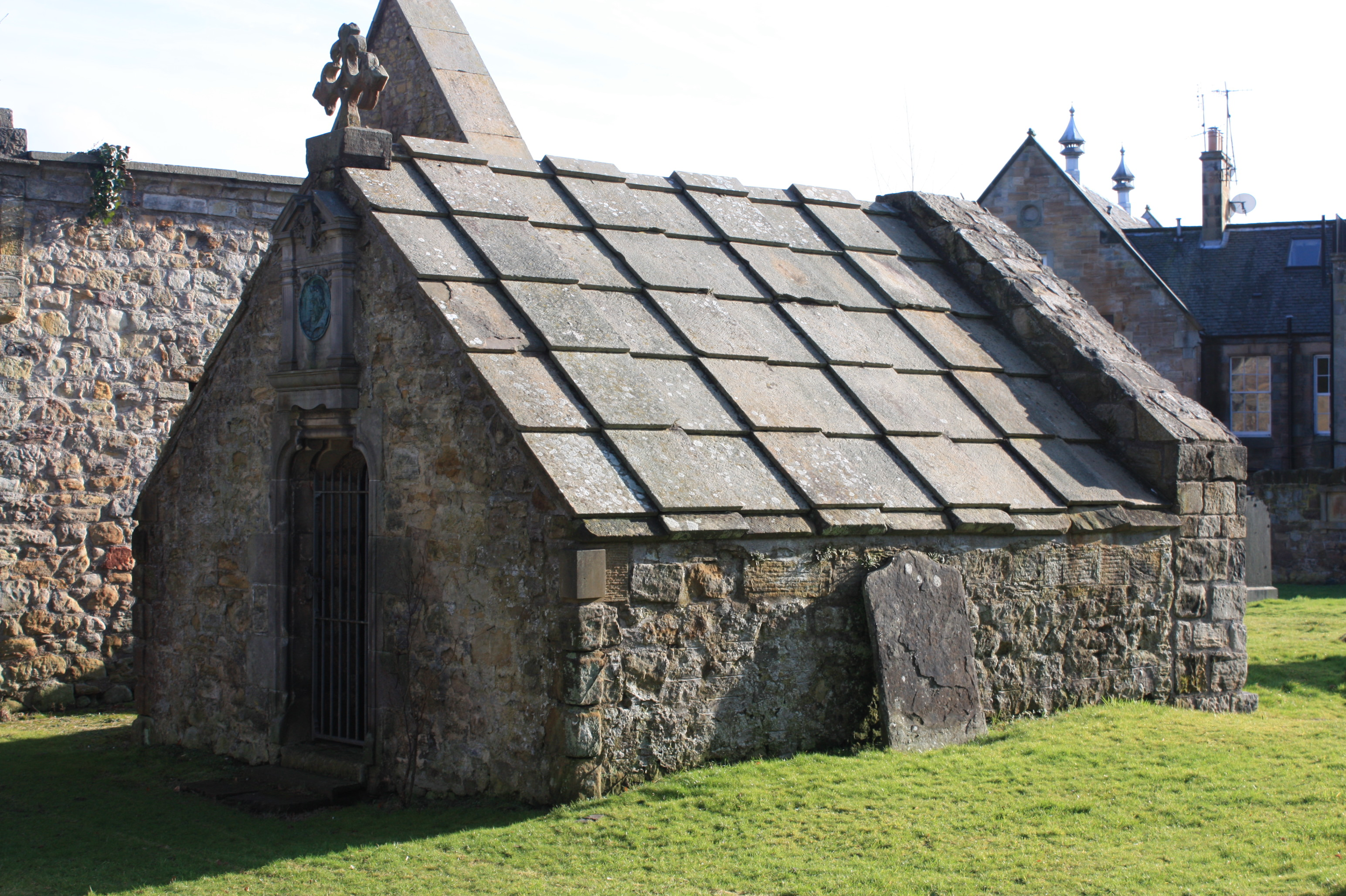
The burial vault of William Drummond of Hawthornden, Lasswade Kirkyard

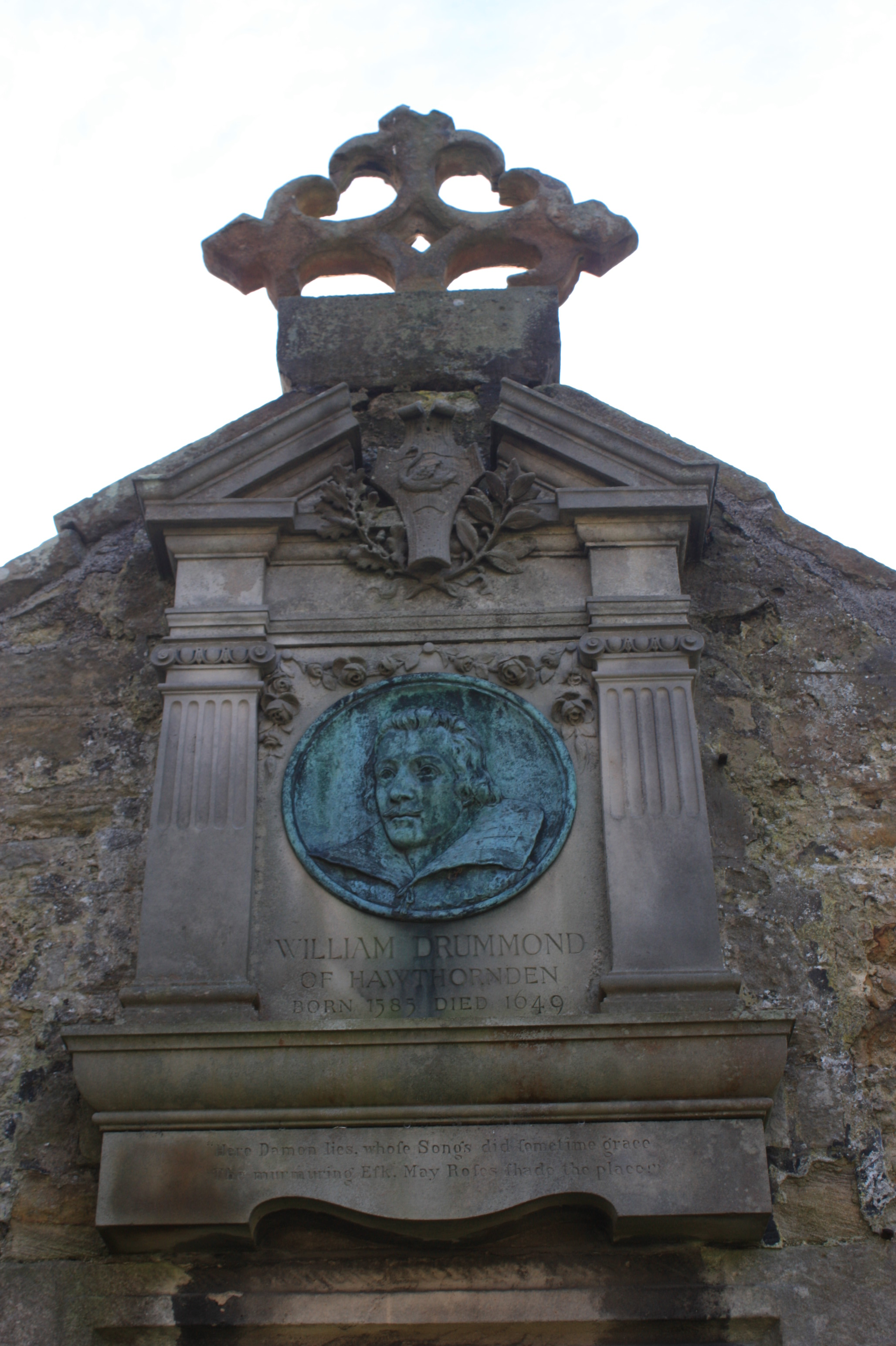
Plaque to William Drummond dating from the restoration of his vault in 1892

Partly to please his kinsman the earl of Perth, and partly to satisfy his own curiosity, the poet made researches in the genealogy of the family. This investigation was the real secret of Drummond's interest in Scottish history; and so we find that he now began his History of Scotland during the Reigns of the Five Jameses, a work which did not appear till 1655, and is remarkable only for its good literary style. His next work was called forth by the king's enforced submission to the opposition of his Scottish subjects. It is entitled Irene: or a Remonstrance for Concord, Amity, and Love amongst His Majesty's Subjects (1638), and embodies Drummond's political creed of submission to authority as the only logical refuge from democracy, which he hated. In 1639 Drummond grudgingly signed the Covenant solely for self-protection, but was uneasy under the burden, as several political squibs by him testify. In 1643 he published Σκιαμαχία: or a Defence of a Petition tendered to the Lords of the Council of Scotland by certain Noblemen and Gentlemen, a political pamphlet in support of Cavaliers in Scotland who wished to defend the king's cause against the Rump Parliament. Its burden is an invective against the intolerance of the then dominant Presbyterian ministers.

His later works may be described briefly as royalist pamphlets, written with more or less caution, as the times required. Drummond took the part of Montrose; and a letter from the Royalist leader in 1646 acknowledged his services. He also wrote a pamphlet, A Vindication of the Hamiltons, supporting the claims of the Duke of Hamilton to lead the Scottish army which was to release Charles I. It is said that Drummond's health received a severe shock when news was brought of the king's execution.

He died on 4 December 1649. He was buried in a stone vault in his parish church of Lasswade. His tomb was restored in 1892 and a bronze relief was added over the entrance.

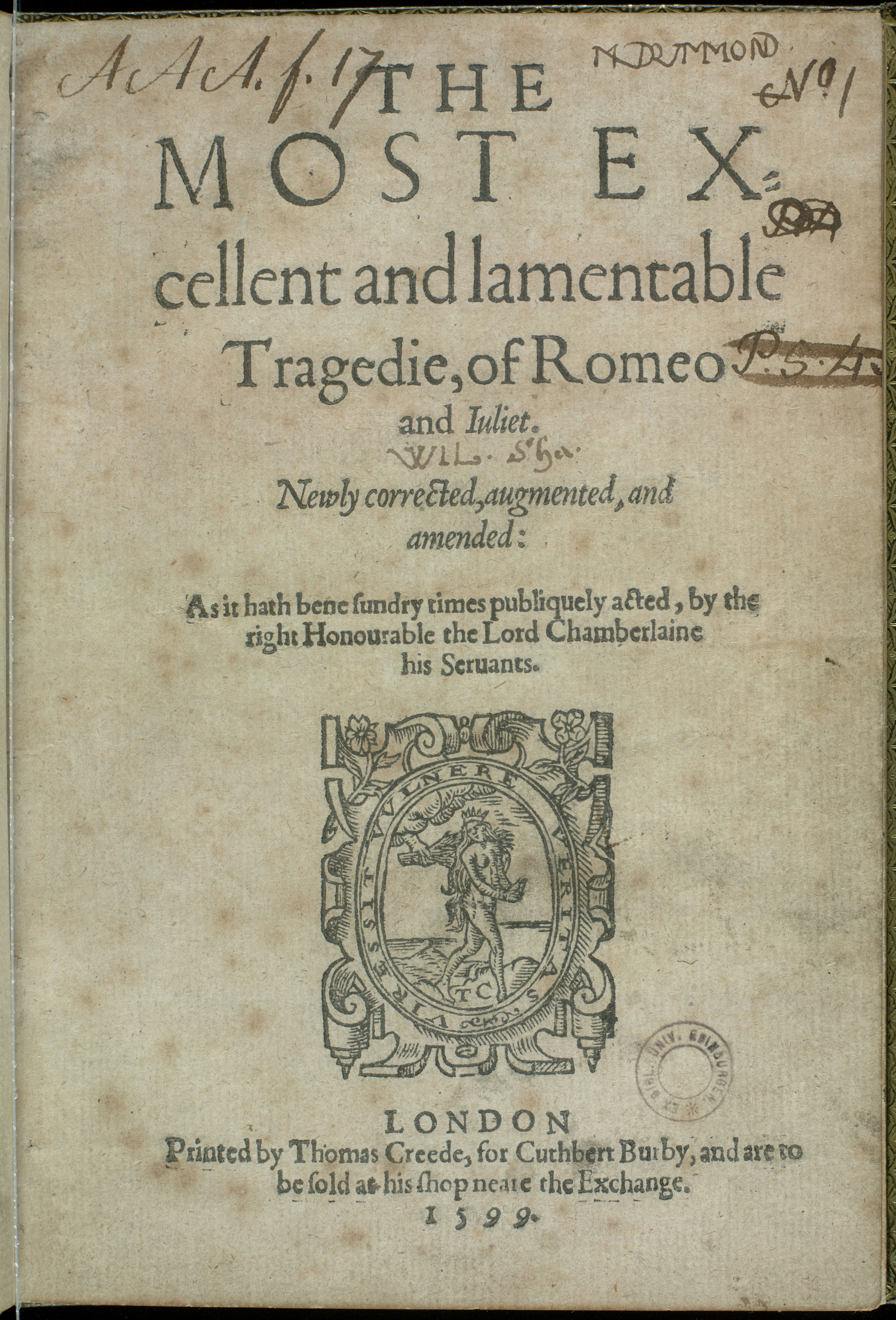
Title page of 1599 printed edition of Shakespeare's Romeo and Juliet donated by William Drummond to University of Edinburgh's Heritage Collection.

== Public memorials ==
Drummond is one of the sixteen poets and writers whose heads appear on the Scott Monument on Princes Street in Edinburgh. He appears on the far right side on the north face.

== Works ==
Drummond's most important works are the Cypresse Grove and the poems. The Cypresse Grove is an essay on the folly of the fear of death.

Drummond was called "the Scottish Petrarch". The burlesque poem Polemo Middinia inter Vitarvam et Nebernam (printed anonymously in 1684) has been ascribed to him.

English composer Gerald Finzi's Three Short Elegies Op. 5 (1926) consists of musical settings for an unaccompanied chorus of three of Drummond's poems: "Life a Right Shadow Is", "This World A Hunting Is" and "This Life, Which Seems So Fair".

== Archives ==
Drummond, a graduate of the University of Edinburgh, was a prolific collector of books and manuscripts, who donated over 600 items to his former University from 1626. As well as treasures in the fields of literature, history, geography, philosophy and theology, science, medicine and law, Drummond also donated several, now 'iconic', Shakespeare quartos. These quartos included a copy of the first good quarto of Romeo and Juliet, published during Shakespeare’s lifetime, Drummond's contemporary. Works by Jonson, Spenser, Drayton and Sir Philip Sidney were also donated.

A volume of memorials compiled by William Drummond and continued by his son (also William) is held at the University of Dundee as part of the archives of the Brechin Diocesan Library.

== Editions ==
- Phillips, Edward, ed. (1656). Poems, by that most famous wit, William Drummond of Hawthornden. London: Company of Stationers. OCLC 1152968917.
- Sage, John; Ruddiman, Thomas, eds. (1711). The Works of William Drummond, of Hawthornden. Edinburgh: James Watson. OCLC 1008342211.
- The Poems of William Drummond of Hawthornden. Edinburgh: Maitland Club. 1832. OCLC 1050723344.
- Cunningham, Peter, ed. (1833). The Poems of William Drummond of Hawthornden. London: Cochrane and M'Crone. OCLC 4477989.
- Turnbull, William B., ed. (1856). The Poetical Works of William Drummond of Hawthornden. London: John Russel Smith. OCLC 1050800065.
- Ward, William C., ed. (1894). The Poems of William Drummond of Hawthornden. The Muses' Library. New York: Chas. Scribner's Sons. OCLC 806994305. Volume 1 Volume 2
- Kastner, L. E., ed. (1913). The Poetical Works of William Drummond of Hawthornden: With 'A Cypresse Grove'. Edinburgh: William Blackwood and Sons. OCLC 1050811600. Volume 1 Volume 2
- MacDonald, Robert H., ed. (1976). William Drummond of Hawthornden: Poems and Prose. Edinburgh: Scottish Academic Press. ISBN 0701121920. OCLC 651859856.
- Siefring, Jacob, and Joshua Rothes, eds. (2021). A Cypresse Grove. Seattle, WA: Sublunary Editions. ISBN 978-1-955190-23-7.

== In fiction ==
William Drummond features as a character in Jean Findlay's novel, The Queen's Lender (2022).

== See also ==
- Henry Adamson

== Sources ==
- This work in turn cites:
  - Standard biography of Drummond by David Masson (1873)
  - Extracts from the Hawthornden manuscripts preserved in the Library of the Society of Antiquaries of Scotland, printed by David Laing in Archaeologia Scotica, vol. iv.
