= John Alexander (bishop) =

Anglican bishop

Styles of John Alexander
- Reference style: The Right Reverend
- Spoken style: My Lord or Bishop

John Alexander (1694–1776) was an Anglican bishop who served in the Scottish Episcopal Church as Bishop of Dunkeld from 1743 to 1776.

Born in 1694, he was the son of the Reverend John Alexander, Incumbent of Kildrummy, and Anna Alexander, née Gordon. He was educated at Marischal College, Aberdeen from 1706 to 1710. It had been intended that he would succeed his father at Kildrummy, however, his ecclesiastical career took him elsewhere.

He was ordained a deacon at Aberdeen on 24 September 1724 and a priest by Bishop Irvine on 26 December 1724. He was appointed the Incumbent of Alloa in 1724, and Bishop of Dunkeld in 1743. He was consecrated to the Episcopate at Edinburgh on 19 August 1743 by bishops Keith, White, Falconer and Rait. He also administered the See of Dunblane from 1743 to 1774.

He died in office on 24 April 1776, at age 82.

== Bibliography ==
- Bertie, David M. (2000). Scottish Episcopal Clergy, 1689-2000. Edinburgh: T & T Clark. ISBN 0567087468.
- Skinner, John (1818). Annals of Scottish Episcopacy. Aberbeen: A. Brown & Co.

Religious titles
| Preceded by Thomas Rattray | Bishop of Dunkeld; 1743–1776 | Succeeded by Charles Rose |
