= George Innes (RAF officer) =

Royal Air Force officer and Provost Marshal (1923–2015)

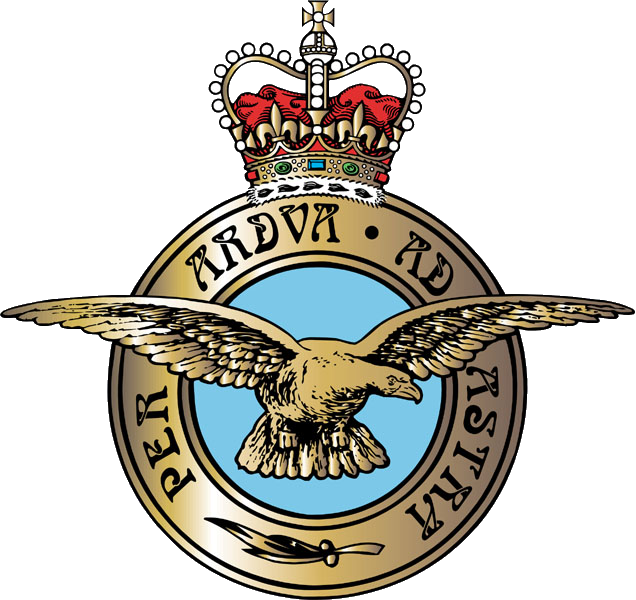
- Born: George Innes; 26 November 1923; Musselburgh, East Lothian
- Died: 11 January 2015 (aged 91); Dorset
- Military career
- Allegiance: United Kingdom
- Branch: Royal Air Force
- Service years: 1943–1978
- Rank: Air Commodore
- Service number: 193292
- Unit: Special Investigation Branch
- Commands: RAF Police
- Conflicts: World War II; Cold War
- Awards: Commander of the Order of the British Empire

Air Commodore George Innes CBE (26 November 1923 – 11 January 2015) was a Royal Air Force officer, former RAF Provost Marshal and head of RAF counter intelligence who helped expose a Soviet spy in 1968 and was security officer for the British nuclear tests conducted at Christmas Island.

== Early life ==
Innes was born on 26 November 1923 at Musselburgh, East Lothian and educated at Crookston School in Scotland.

== Wartime service ==
He was called up for service at the end of 1943 as Aircraftman 2nd class (service number 1570346) and became a student pilot, training at RAF Weeton and on the Commonwealth Air Training Plan in South Africa. Commissioned as pilot officer on 31 March 1945, Innes gained his pilot's aircrew brevet wings just as hostilities ended in Europe. On 1 October 1945 he was promoted flying officer.

On discharge from wartime service he joined the City of Edinburgh police force, serving as a police constable until his application for a commission in the Provost and Security Branch of the Royal Air Force.

== Royal Air Force career ==
=== Far East ===
In January 1946 he was in command of the RAF Police in Bangkok following the assassination of King Ramas VIII Ananda Mahidol. Innes accomplished the safe extraction of the new King Ramas IX Bhumibol Adulyadej using an RAF transport aircraft before he could suffer a similar fate. He served as an acting flying officer. Shortly afterwards the RAF moved out of Thailand and he set up the regional HQ of the Special Investigation Branch of the RAF Police in Rangoon. Until 20 February 1947 Innes held the appointment of assistant to the provost marshal, later proving himself successful in Hong Kong and Singapore. For some time he was in charge of training RAF police dogs at RAF Netheravon, Wiltshire. On 7 May 1951 Innes was appointed an assistant to the provost marshal. On 13 March 1951 he was promoted to full Flying Officer on a short service commission, which was updated on 1 April 1952 to a permanent regular commission, and then on 1 January 1953 he was promoted flight lieutenant.

=== Thermo nuclear Tests ===
Innes specialised in criminal investigations and counterintelligence, and was appointed security officer for Task Force Grapple, participating in Operation Grapple – the British thermonuclear tests conducted at Kiritimati, Christmas Island – in 1956.

=== Counterintelligence ===
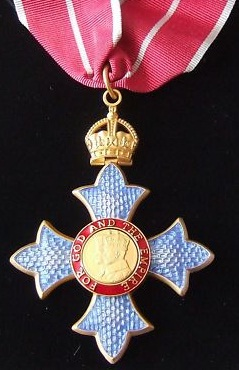
Commander of the Order of the British Empire

In 1963 Innes was one for two RAF officers appointed to supervise the creation of the RAF Security Directorate to review internal security. This followed a high-profile inquiry headed by Lord Denning into the Portland spy ring, which resulted in the conviction of five people who had been spying within the Royal Navy for the Soviets. On 1 January 1966 Innes was promoted squadron leader. In February 1968 MI5 received a tip that an RAF serviceman was offering information to the Soviet GRU intelligence service and after initial case work was completed, in July the RAF became involved. As head of RAF counterintelligence, Innes led the hunt and identified Chief Technician Douglas Britten (born 31 October 1931, died Feb 1990), an RAF signals intelligence specialist serving at No. 399 Signals Unit at RAF Digby and also at a listening station in Cyprus which cooperated with Government Communications Headquarters (GCHQ). Innes's team arrested Britten on 13 September 1968. Searches of Britten's home and other locations yielded spying equipment including some supplied by the Soviet Intelligence Service. Britten confessed and stood trial at the Central Criminal Court, receiving a sentence of 21 years imprisonment.

On 1 January 1974 Innes was promoted group captain.

=== RAF Provost Marshal ===
In 1976 Innes was appointed an ADC to the Queen, and on 27 February appointed RAF Provost Marshal, the highest post within the RAF Police, quickly being promoted to Air Commodore on 1 July 1976. Innes held the position until 13 May 1978.

He retired on 1 July 1978.

== Honours and awards ==
- Commander of the Order of the British Empire - January 1978.

== Later life ==
He became principal emergency planning officer responsible for home defence and responding to natural disasters for Strathclyde Regional Council, and he later took up a similar job with the Greater London Council.

Innes followed football and rugby, attending games at Murrayfield until shortly before his death, and was also a keen golfer. He married his wife Betty, a former WAAF, in 1947. She and their son and daughter survived him. Innes died on 11 January 2015 in Dorset although his funeral was held in St. Michael's church at Inveresk.
