= James Gadderar =

James Gadderar (1655–1733) was a clergyman of the Scottish Episcopal Church and a significant figure in the Nonjuring schism.

== Early life and ministry ==
He was born in 1655, the second son of William Gadderar of Cowford in Moray, then known as Elginshire, and Margaret Marshall. His older brother, Alexander, was a ministor of Girvan.

He graduated with an MA from the University of Glasgow in 1675, and became minister of Kilmalcolm in 1682. In 1687, his episcopalian sympathies, and hostility to the presbyterians, had made him so unpopular in his parish that a mob made up mainly of women and children drove him out of his parish. More vicars of his faction would meet the same fate the following year in the context of the Glorious Revolution, including his brother. At some point after this, he travelled to London, where he would spend most of his time until 1724.

== London ==
In London Gadderar was part of a group of non-juring Scots and English who called themselves the "Orthodox and Catholic remnants of the British Church". In 1703, he published a translation from the Latin of Thomas Craig's The Right of Succession to the Kingdom of England, including a preface written by himself expressing his jacobitism and opposition to presbyterianism. He supported the view that, in circumstances where the Church did not enjoy the protection of the secular authority, its bishops ceased to be answerable to princes.

He was consecrated a college bishop (i.e. a bishop without a diocese) on 24 February 1712 by the English non-juring Bishop George Hickes, and the Scottish bishops John Falconer and Gadderar's close friend, Bishop Archibald Campbell. The consecration was irregular, in that it was the only instance of an English non-juring bishop consecrating a member of the Scottish non-juring church, which was institutionally separate and did not have identical theological or political convictions. However, the Scottish non-juring bishops in London, including Gadderar, subsequently participated in the consecrations of several non-juring English bishops, as part of Hickes' project to maintain what he regarded as a legitimate apostolic succession in England, in view of the inability of William of Orange and his successors to validly appoint bishops having usurped the legitimate king, James II. No official mention of Gadderar or Campbell, then still in London, was made when the Episcopal college of bishops met in 1720 in Edinburgh to formalise its status, due to the perceived unpopularity of their liturgical convictions. The same year he oversaw the reprinting of the Laudian Scottish Prayer Book of 1637, which became the basis of the Episcopal church's liturgy through the 18th century.

Between 1716 and 1723, he participated enthusiastically in negotiations for intercommunion with the Eastern churches made through Arsenius, the metropolitan of Thebais, who was visiting Britain on behalf of Patriarch Samuel of Alexandria, on a fundraising mission. However, despite the support of Peter the Great, the negotiations were unsuccessful.

== Return to Scotland ==
In 1721 Campbell was elected as Bishop of Aberdeen by the Episcopal presbyters of the diocese, where support for the "primitive usages" of the Scottish church, such as the mixing of water with communion wine and prayer for the dead, in accordance with the relatively traditionalist 1549 Book of Common Prayer, was particularly strong. Differences of opinions as to the extent to which these usages should be restored became the primary factional split within the Episcopal church, with Gadderar and Campbell staunch supporters of their use. Rather than going to Aberdeen himself, Campbell sent Gadderar to Aberdeen as his vicar-depute, in the hope that he would be more acceptable to the college of bishops, which was dominated by the anti-usager party.

Gadderar nonetheless came into conflict with the college, who were actually on the point of summoning him to Edinburgh to suspend him in 1723, but relented for fear of publicising the divisions within the Episcopal Church. After the resignation of Bishop Campbell due to ill-health in 1725, he was made Bishop of Aberdeen, remaining there until his death. He was simultaneusly Bishop of Moray from the same year.

He died in 1733, and was buried in the grave of Bishop Patrick Scougal in St Machar's Cathedral, in Aberdeen.

Religious titles
Preceded by Archibald Campbell	Bishop of Aberdeen; 1724–1733	Succeeded by William Dunbar
