= Arthur Petrie =

- Bishop of Moray, Ross and Caithness
- Church: Scottish Episcopal Church

Orders
- Ordination: 27 June 1776 by William Falconer

Arthur Petrie (died 19 April 1787) was the 37th bishop of the Diocese of Ross and Moray of the Scottish Episcopal Church. He was one of the three bishops to consecrate Samuel Seabury, an American Episcopal priest as a bishop in 1784.

The Glasgow Mercury newspaper reporting his death at Micklefollo, described him as 'a dignified clergyman of the Episcopal Church in Scotland, much respected'.
