= James Rait =

Bishop of Brechin

The Right Reverend James Rait
- Bishop of Brechin
- Church: Scottish Episcopal Church
- Diocese: Brechin
- Elected: 25 August 1742
- In office: 1742-1777
- Predecessor: John Ochterlony
- Successor: George Innes

Orders
- Consecration: 4 October 1742 by Thomas Rattray

Personal details
- Born: 1689
- Died: 13 January 1777 (aged 87–88)
- Denomination: Anglican

Styles of James Rait, MA
- Reference style: The Right Reverend
- Spoken style: My Lord or Bishop

James Rait, MA (1689–1777) was an Anglican clergyman who served in the Scottish Episcopal Church as the Bishop of Brechin from 1742 to 1777.

== Biography ==
He was consecrated the Bishop of the Diocese of Brechin on 4 October 1742 at Edinburgh by Primus Rattray and bishops Keith and White, having been elected to the position on 25 August 1742.

He died in office on 13 January 1777, aged 87.

Scottish Episcopal Church titles
Preceded by John Ochterlony	Bishop of Brechin; 1742–1777	Succeeded by George Innes
