= Scottish Prayer Book (1637) =

Anglican liturgical book

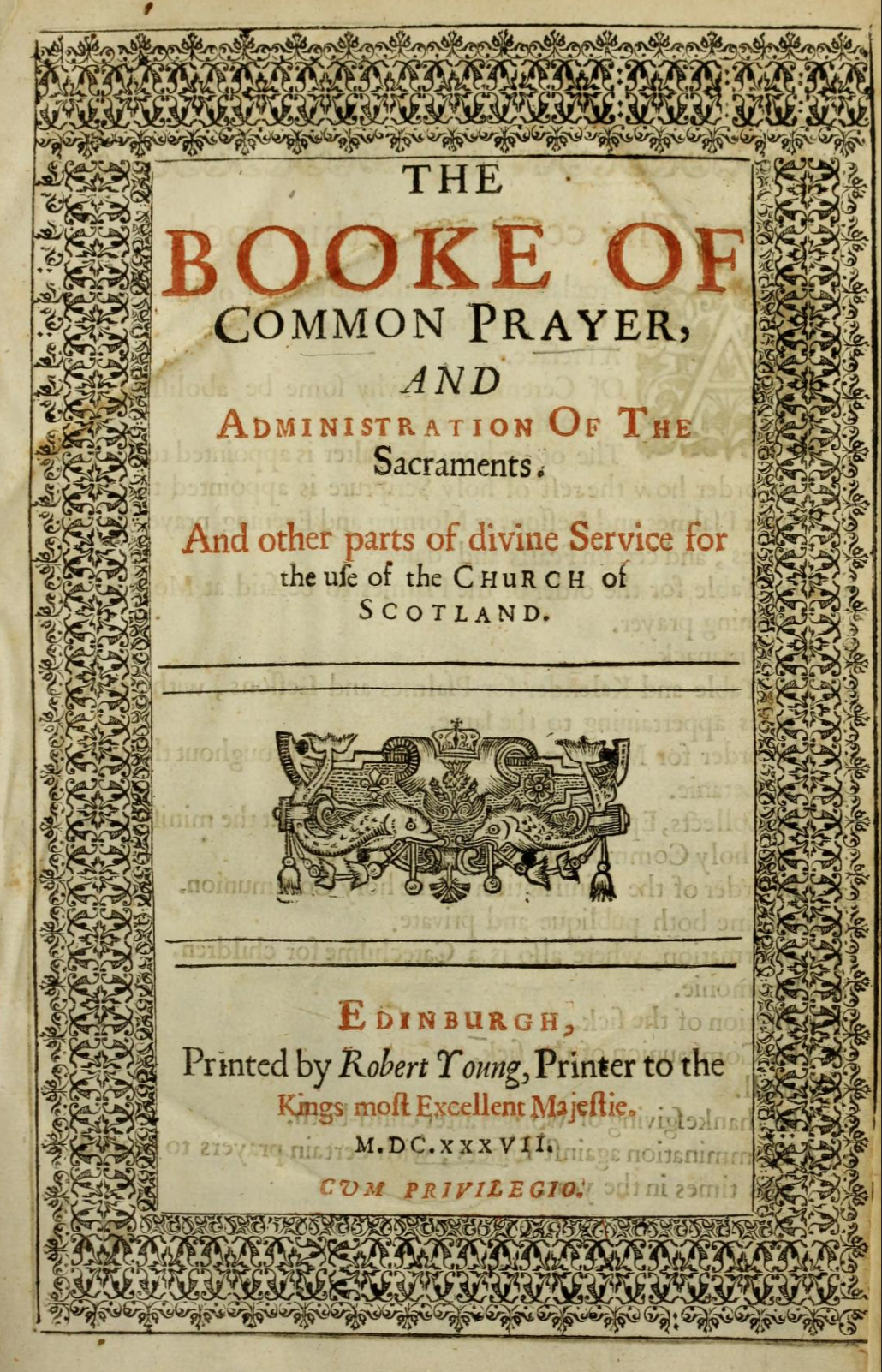
Title page of the 1637 Scottish Book of Common Prayer

The 1637 Book of Common Prayer, (Note: The full name of the 1637 Scottish prayer book, as given in a 1637 printing, was The Booke of Common Prayer, and Administration Of The Sacraments, And others parts of divine Service for the use of the Church of Scotland.) commonly known as the Scottish Prayer Book or Scottish liturgy, was a version of the English Book of Common Prayer revised for use by the Church of Scotland. The 1637 prayer book shared much with the 1549 English prayer book—rather than the later, more reformed English revisions—and contained Laudian liturgical preferences with some concessions to a Scottish and Presbyterian audience. Charles I, as King of Scotland and England had wished to impose the liturgical book to align Scottish worship with that of the Church of England. However, after a coordinated series of protests—including the legendary opposition by Jenny Geddes at St Giles' Cathedral—the 1637 prayer book was rejected.

== Background and introduction ==
=== Early Stuart English and Scottish liturgies ===
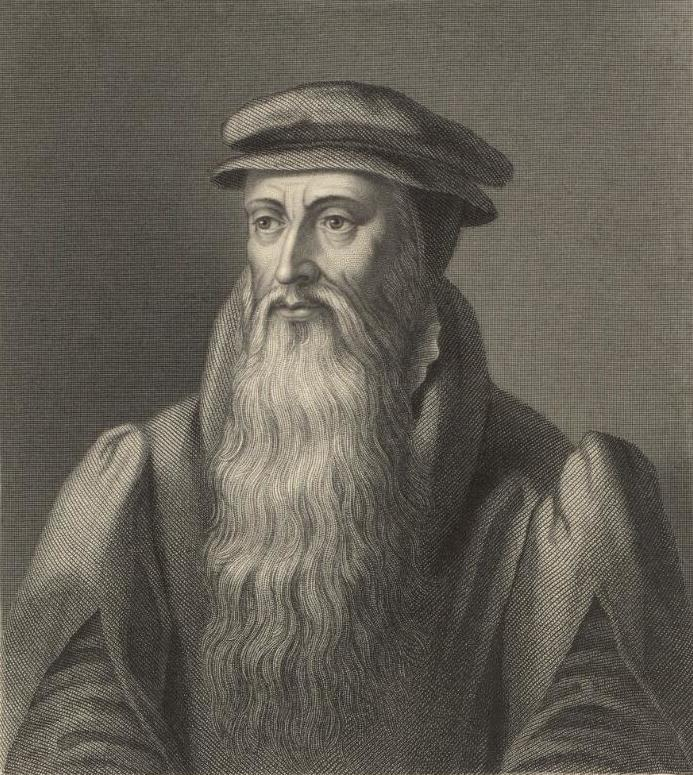
The Church of Scotland utilized the 1552 English prayer book until John Knox (pictured) introduced his Book of Common Order, a service book heavily influenced by John Calvin's liturgies in Geneva.

James VI, the King of Scotland, united the Scottish and English crowns in a personal union, but not the two countries, on the death of Queen Elizabeth I in 1603. During his procession from Scotland to London, Puritans presented James with the Millenary Petition in the hope that he would side with them on the religious controversies between the established Church of England and the more reformed Puritans that had embroiled England for the last five decades. The "godly" Puritans had hoped that their new Scottish king would conform English worship to that present in Presbyterian Scotland. However, James would come to back English liturgical norms and sponsor "Anglicization" efforts in the Church of Scotland (the Kirk).

In the Church of England at the time of the Millenary Petition, conservative and reformed parties had long been sparring over the a variety of liturgical matters. While the 1559 Act of Uniformity had established the Elizabethan Book of Common Prayer as the only approved basis of worship, the ceremonial in the prayer book's rituals varied widely dependent on the celebrants' personal theologies. In Scotland, John Knox had introduced a more radically Protestant liturgy in 1559: the Book of Common Order was derived from John Calvin's La Forme des Prières which had been used by English Marian exiles in Geneva. Knox's liturgy was also influenced to a lesser degree by the 1552 English Book of Common Prayer. The 1552 prayer book had been used until the Book of Common Order's introduction and the 1552 Communion office remained largely unchanged in English prayer books until the 1662 prayer book. The Scottish service book, also known as The Form of Prayers, was revised in 1564 to further approximate Calvin's liturgy.

The contemporary English prayer book was strongly opposed among many in Scotland. When rumours circulated in 1562 that Mary, Queen of Scots, had been persuaded to adopt the English rites by her uncle, the Cardinal of Lorraine, the supposed arrangement drew significant ire among the Scots, who felt English religion was "little better than when it was at the worst". Continental reformed worship became entrenched in Scotland but failed to make inroads in England during Elizabeth's reign, with the queen suppressing a formal effort to introduce modified versions of the Book of Common Order and celebration according to this pattern occurring in secret. At Elizabeth's death, both recusant Catholics and Puritans were repressed but still present. (Note: The first group of English Puritans to break from the Church of England did so in 1566, modeling their worship on the Knox's order for the Kirk. Their conventicle was disbanded on 4 March 1568, with some arrested and the others fleeing to Scotland.)

Rather than embracing the Millenary Petition's demands, James instead convened the Hampton Court Conference in January 1604. The established church side sent eight bishops, seven deans, and two doctors of divinity; the Puritans were permitted four representatives. James came to support the establishment's preference for only minor revisions to the prayer book, with the 1604 Book of Common Prayer ultimately favouring the bishops even more than the conference's conclusion had suggested. (Note: The Hampton Court Conference excluded two of the Millenary Petition's chief advocates, Stephen Egerton and Arthur Hildersham. The conference also produced a new set of canons, a revised catechism, and ultimately the 1611 King James Version of the Bible.) English Puritans resented the conference's outcome. A petition by ministers in the Diocese of Lincoln was published in 1605 and provided extensive reformed commentary on the 1604 prayer book. The anonymous 1606 Survey of the Book of Common Prayer critiqued the new prayer book and advocated for the English to adopt the Book of Common Order as a means of unifying English and Scottish worship.

However, James would press the Kirk to conform with the English church's episcopal polity and worship. After 1610, Scottish bishops were consecrated according to the English ordinal. By 1617, James began renovating his Scottish Chapel Royal at Holyrood Palace away from Presbyterian form towards the ceremonial needs of the English services. It was the King's pressure that saw the Five Articles of Perth passed by the Kirk's General Assembly in 1618 and the Scottish Parliament in 1621, which introduced English practices such as kneeling at Communion, episcopal confirmation, and certain festal observances. Revision to Scottish worship had been active since at least 1601, but James pressed for these efforts to be accelerated on the advice of the Archbishop of St Andrews, John Spottiswoode. Moderate bishop William Cowper, who was dean of the Scottish Chapel Royal, created two drafts dated 1616–1617 and 1618–1619, with the latter incorporating both elements of the Book of Common Order and 1604 prayer book in the Communion service. These drafts went unadopted as the Articles of Perth were met with significant opposition, particularly the kneeling requirements. (Note: Cowper's liturgy only survives in its final draft, with what were likely minor amendments suggested by the King.)

During the latter years of James's reign, William Laud was among a party of divines who had grown increasingly attached to ceremonial practices which aligned more with medieval Catholic rites rather than the legally mandated Protestant practices. These divines all showed a preference for theology derived from reflections of the Church Fathers over the teachings of the reformers. Known as the Durham House Group, these divines included then-Bishop of Durham Richard Neile and other protégés of Lancelot Andrewes. Andrewes had argued the Church of England should further distance itself from Continental European reformed worship, with his followers believing that the less-reformed 1549 Book of Common Prayer should be used as a model rather than the 1552-descended prayer books.

=== Revision ===
On James's death, Charles I became the new king of both Scotland and England. Little progress had been made on revision until Charles raised the matter in 1629. That year, the 1619 draft liturgy was ordered south where it was presented by John Maxwell in August or September. Maxwell returned to Scotland in November, possibly bringing with him a letter from the King to the Archbishop of St Andrews with instructions to introduce the English liturgy and ceremonial to Scotland; the certainty of such letter and its contents are not established, but the Kirk apparently received a respite from instituting these changes if such a command was given. Perhaps concerned that a new liturgy would disturb the peace, older Scottish bishops preferred to avoid further discussion on revision.

In 1633, Charles went to Scotland; the same year, Laud became the Archbishop of Canterbury and conversed with Scottish bishops. Maxwell, by then the Bishop of Ross, was among the Scottish clergy that were open to a new liturgy. However, other Scottish bishops continued viewing liturgical revision with hesitancy. Charles and Laud both preferred introducing the 1604 English prayer book but, relenting to pressure towards revision, the Scottish bishops expressed their desire than any new service book be revised specifically for the Kirk. The Scottish desire to adopt their own liturgy rather than that of England was not solely premised on national pride, as there were grievances with the English prayer book. Among these was the 1604 prayer book's use of an older bible translation instead of the 1611 King James Version and the inclusion of readings from the Apocrypha. (Note: During his visit to Scotland, the English prayer book had been used both in the Chapel Royal and in St Giles'; Charles later claimed that the English liturgy had also been used in every church in which he had worshipped during his visit.)

Due to the ten-day to two-week lag between Scottish bishops sending a message and them receiving the King's response, Charles entrusted others with authority to address problems as they arose. For this reason, Spottiswoode was granted the authority to make any changes to the new prayer book as printing was about to commence. Bishop Matthew Wren's involvement in the revision process is considered relatively limited. Wren had been invited to comment on proposals made by the Bishop of Dunblane, James Wedderburn, after printing had begun. Wren also had a penchant for obscure words, leading to speculation that he was involved in the language of the Offertory as it appeared in the Christ Church book—using the uncommon word "treatably" that was eventually replaced by "distinctly".

=== Reaction, rejection, and fallout ===
Vegetable-seller Jenny Geddes threw a stool at a bishop as he attempted to celebrate Communion according to the 1637 prayer book.

On Sunday, 23 July 1637, the new prayer book was almost immediately met with a coordinated set of demonstrations against it and its perceived Romanized liturgy. The protests were "carefully stage-managed"; the most famous episode was that of Jenny Geddes at St Giles' Cathedral on 23 July 1637. As the Communion office was being celebrated, Geddes is said to have thrown a stool at the Bishop of Edinburgh and yelled "Villian! Daur ye say Mass in my lug." (Note: The precise phrasing of Geddes's interjection also varies between sources. According to Bryan D. Spinks, Geddes exclamation was "Villian! Do you say Mass at my lug (ear)?") Walter Whitford, the Bishop of Brechin, was apparently aware of this and other violent reactions to the 1637 text: he celebrated his first service according to the new prayer book with two loaded pistols on the desk before him and visible to the congregation.

Charles trusted his Scottish Privy Council to respond to the riots and keep him informed on developments. Soon, though, the riot and movement behind it became a revolution.

According to Thomas Fuller, 1637 saw a "Scotch Nation full of discontents" and the prayer book's introduction was "as when the cup is brimfull before, the last (though least) superadded drop is charged alone to be the cause of all the running over." Gordon Donaldson, agreeing that the prayer book's introduction was the "'last' drop", would challenge the assertion that it was "least" in prompting opposition that had "already organised into something little short of conspiracy." George Gillespie's critique of the new liturgy was among the first, taking an apocalyptic tone in his disdain for the "disastrous mutation (to be bewailed with teares of blood)". Charles Firth would later credit the attempted imposition of the 1637 prayer book as a cause in the wars to soon follow.

== Later use and influence ==
=== Savoy and the 1662 prayer book ===
In 1660, the Stuart Restoration saw the release of Wren from the Tower of London and the return of King Charles II and John Cosin. Soon, the Presbyterian proposed that a new liturgy be composed "or at least to revise and effectually reform the old". Charles II issued a declaration in October for "divines of different persuasions" to revise and expand the Book of Common Prayer. Wren and Cosin would draw upon their experience with the 1637 prayer book in producing their alterations to the prayer book. Utilizing a 1619 folio copy of the English prayer book—now called the "Durham Book"—Wren and Cosin entered annotations of suggested changes. While neither directly referenced the 1637 prayer book in their papers on the revision, G. J. Cuming believed that they had "frequently borrowed its ideas". In their Durham Book annotations, they often borrowed verbatim from the 1637 prayer book. Cuming, considering that Wren was more lukewarm than Cosin towards the 1549 prayer book, posited that Wren had used the 1549-leaning Scottish liturgy as means of integrating Cosin's desired changes.

=== Nonjurors ===
The 1637 prayer book was revived for worship following the Nonjuring schism as part of a general liturgical revival in Scotland. George Seton, 5th Earl of Winton, helped get a new edition of the 1637 text published in Edinburgh in 1712. Booklets containing the 1637 Communion rite starting at the Offertory were published in 1722 and 1724 as pamphlets known as "wee bookies".

== Contents ==
While the 1637 Scottish Book of Common Prayer has historically been interpreted by liturgiologists as a revision of the English prayer book with Laudian or "Canterburian" deviations—"here, the Laudian programme is in full flower," according to G. J. Cuming—Donaldson and Spinks also found it to contain concessions for its Scottish intended audience. Among these are the substitution of presbyter instead of priest throughout. (Note: The Canterburians appear to have preferred the term priest over presbyter but found the latter unobjectionable and preferred by the Scots. In England, prayer books from 1604 until 1642 used the terms priest and minister interchangeably.) However, other changes were denied by Charles I, resulting some proposals intended to placate the Scots not making it to the final approved version. Ultimately, the 1637 prayer book leaned heavily upon the 1549 prayer book, with approval of the Durham House Group's sacramental theology.

The Scottish compilers involved in the 1637 prayer book had hoped its liturgical calendar would not emulate the English prayer book's larger number of feasts. However, Charles I won out and 29 feasts were included, which John Row identified as two more than that of the 1604 English prayer book. The Scottish Kalendar also included 15 Scots in the calendar of saints. At introduction, observance according to the 1637 Kalendar was not intended to be obligatory. Pasch is used instead of Easter and Yule supplants Christmas, both modified with an eye to Scottish preferences.

The Hampton Court Conference was responsible for the use of the King James Bible throughout and exclusion of much of the Apocrypha. The Scottish churchmen had hoped to fully remove the Apocrypha, but Charles I overrode these efforts and preserved 12 chapters of readings from the Book of Wisdom and Ecclesiasticus for use on six saints' days. Since celebrating these saints' days were not mandated in the Church of Scotland, the Scots evaded the King's goal of requiring these readings.

=== Communion office ===
The 1637 Communion office was modified towards that of the 1549 prayer book, with influence from both Lancelot Andrewes and John Overall. Six sentences from Andrewes's "Peculiar Sentences for the Offertory" were inserted, while ten of the English prayer book's preexisting—including those from the Book of Tobit—were deleted. Laud's agitation prevented the removal of all 20. In the prayer for the Church Militant, there was reference to the dead; this had been originally omitted in 1552, though the 1637 form did not restore reference to Mary, the patriarchs, prophets, apostles, and martyrs, nor does it commend the departed to God's mercy. The sursum corda, preface, and Sanctus were united with the Words of Institution and the 1549 prayer book's Epiclesis to form what was christened "The Prayer of Consecration". (Note: "The Prayer of Consecration" was named at Laud's suggestion.) The connection of the consecration to Words of Institution was contrary to the Scottish Book of Common Order's formulation and therefore subject to Gillespie's criticism.

=== Occasional offices ===
The 1637 marriage office was used sparingly by the Nonjurors. Thomas Cranmer had introduced the practice of placing the wedding ring on the left hand in the 1549 prayer book, deviating from pre-Reformation practice that maintained placement of the ring on the right hand. The subsequent English prayer books and the 1637 prayer followed Cranmer's direction, though a tradition mirrored by the pre-Reformation Sarum Use–wherein the ring was briefly placed on the other fingers of the hand in succession from the thumb to the ring finger–suggests that Scotland may have been among the few places that the ring was placed on the left hand during the Middle Ages.

== Appraisal ==
The validity of the accusations of popery that surrounded the 1637 prayer book's introduction have been a matter of academic discussion. Mark Kishlansky, referencing Donaldson, asserted that these claims "have not withstood the scrutiny of scholars." However, Joong-Lak Kim assessed the Scottish Prayer Book as "the Scottish liturgy inclined more towards Catholic practice than did the English [prayer book] liturgy", reflecting Laud's view. However, Kim credited Charles with a role "no smaller than that of any other individual" in the composition of the text. According to Kim, Charles may have intended to establish uniformity in worship across Britain under the 1637 prayer book; Spinks considered this latter assertion to be "intriguing" but also "merely a conjecture".

According to Kim, the 1637 prayer book was conceived by Laud as a localized project with the objective of moving British practice towards Laud's idealized view of a fully catholic church. Kim referenced John Morrill in this appraisal; Morrill interpreted Laud as finding "the Church of England came closest to that ideal, but it too had some way to go; the Churches of Scotland and Ireland had to abandon much false practice even before they began to join the English church in the final strivings after perfection". However, Kim found that Laud and Charles I fatally erred in believing that Scotland would provide them a "smaller and supposedly more manageable country" where they could push their changes first.

== See also ==
- Book of Common Prayer (Unitarian)
- Exhortation and Litany
