= Thomas Rattray =

Scottish Episcopal bishop

The Most Reverend Thomas Rattray D.D.
- Bishop of Dunkeld; Primus of the Scottish Episcopal Church
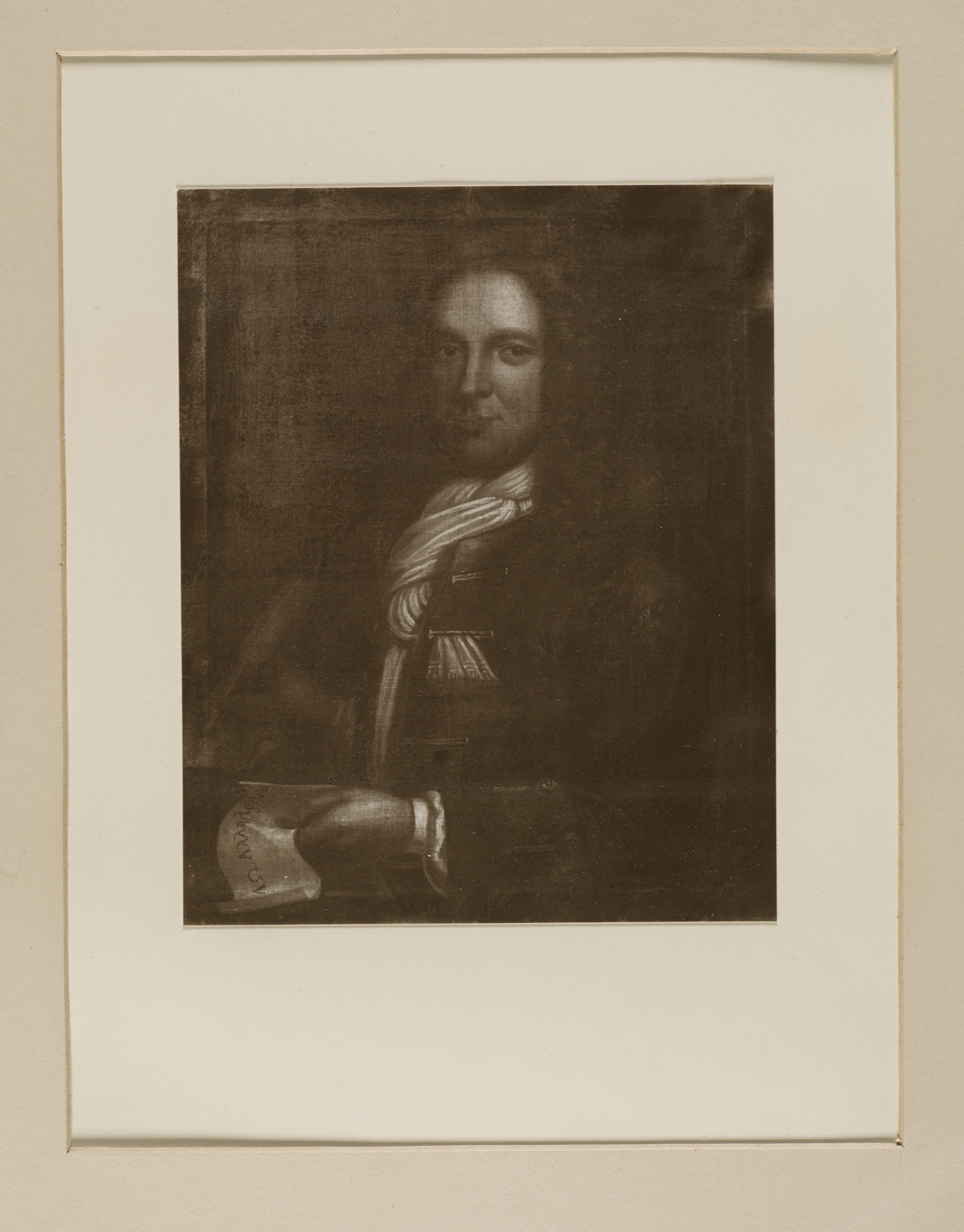
- Church: Scottish Episcopal Church
- In office: 1731-1743
- Predecessor: John Hamilton of Blair
- Successor: John Alexander
- Other post: Primus of the Scottish Episcopal Church (1738–1743)
- Previous post: Bishop of Brechin (1727–1731)

Orders
- Consecration: 4 June 1727 by Arthur Millar

Personal details
- Born: 1684
- Died: 12 May 1743 (aged 59)

Thomas Rattray (1684–1743) was a Scottish Episcopal bishop who served as the Primus of the Scottish Episcopal Church from 1738 to 1743.

He was chosen as Bishop of Brechin by the clergy of that diocese, in opposition to John Ochterlony who was the choice of the college of bishops. He was consecrated in Edinburgh on 4 June 1727 by Primus Millar and bishops Gadderar and Cant, but the college of bishops contended that Rattray's consecration had been irregular and uncanonical. The matter was not resolved until he was appointed Bishop of Dunkeld in 1731. He was also elected the Primus in July 1738.

He died in office on 12 May 1743, aged 59.

Scottish Episcopal Church titles
Preceded by Robert Norrie	Bishop of Brechin; 1727–1731	Succeeded by John Ochterlony
Preceded by John Hamilton	Bishop of Dunkeld; 1731–1743	Succeeded by John Alexander
Preceded by David Freebairn	Primus of the Scottish Episcopal Church; 1738–1743	Succeeded by Robert Keith
