= William Falconer (bishop) =

Scottish clergyman

The Right Reverend William Falconer
- Bishop of Edinburgh; Primus of the Scottish Episcopal Church
- Church: Scottish Episcopal Church
- Elected: 25 October 1776
- In office: 1776–1784
- Predecessor: David Freebairn
- Successor: William Abernethy Drummond
- Other post: Primus of the Scottish Episcopal Church (1762–1782)

Orders
- Ordination: 10 June 1728
- Consecration: 10 September 1741 by Thomas Rattray

Personal details
- Born: 1707
- Died: 15 June 1784 (aged 76–77)
- Denomination: Anglican
- Parents: Alexander Falconer & Jean King

Styles of William Falconer
- Reference style: The Most Reverend
- Spoken style: My Lord or Bishop

William Falconer (or Falconar) (1707–1784) was a Scottish clergyman who served as the Bishop of Moray (1742–1778), Primus of the Scottish Episcopal Church (1762–1782) and Bishop of Edinburgh (1776–1784).

== Life ==
He was the son of Alexander Falconer, an Elgin merchant, and Jean King. His grandfathers were the Reverend William Falconer (the son of Right Reverend Colin Falconer, Bishop of Argyll (1679–80) and Bishop of Moray (1680–86)), and William King of Newmill, Provost of Elgin (1690–1700).

After his ordination on 10 June 1728, he was the Chaplain of Balgowan (1728–35), Minister of Forres (1735–42), and Minister of Elgin (1740–46).

He was appointed coadjutor bishop of Caithness and Orkney and consecrated at Alloa on 10 September 1741 by Thomas Rattray, Primus of the Scottish Episcopal Church, with bishops Robert Keith and Robert White serving as co-consecrators.

He was elected the Bishop of Moray on 10 November 1742, and accepted the see on 12 January 1743. He left Elgin in 1746 and took up residence in Edinburgh. He was unanimously elected Primus of the Scottish Episcopal Church at Forfar on 24 June 1762, and also became the Bishop of Edinburgh on 25 October 1776. He resigned the see of Moray before May 1778 and the office of Primus in September 1782, but retained the see of Edinburgh.

Bishop Falconer died in office on 15 June 1784, aged 77.

== Styles ==
- 1707–1728: William Falconer, Esquire.
- 1728–1741: The Reverend William Falconer.
- 1741–1762: The Right Reverend William Falconer.
- 1762–1782: The Most Reverend Willam Falconer.
- 1782–1784: The Right Reverend William Falconer.

Scottish Episcopal Church titles
Vacant Title last held by George Hay	Bishop of Moray; 1742–1778	Succeeded by Arthur Petrie
Preceded by Robert White	Primus of the Scottish Episcopal Church; 1762–1782	Succeeded by Robert Kilgour
Vacant Title last held by David Freebairn	Bishop of Edinburgh; 1776–1784	Vacant Title last held by William Abernethy Drummond
