= Robert Keith (historian) =

Scottish Episcopal bishop and historian

The Most Reverend Robert Keith A.M.
- Primus of the Scottish Episcopal Church
- Church: Scottish Episcopal Church
- Installed: 1743
- Term ended: 1757
- Predecessor: Thomas Rattray
- Successor: Robert White

Orders
- Ordination: 16 August 1710 (Deacon), 26 May 1713 (Priest)
- Consecration: 18 June 1727 (Bishop) by James Gadderar

Personal details
- Born: 7 February 1681 Uras, Kincardineshire, Scotland
- Died: 20 January 1757 (aged 75) Leith, Edinburgh, Scotland
- Buried: Canongate Churchyard, Edinburgh, Scotland
- Denomination: Anglicanism
- Parents: Alexander Keith and Marjory Keith (née Arbuthnot)
- Spouse: Isobel Cameron
- Children: Two daughters

Bishop Robert Keith (7 February 1681 – 20 January 1757) was a Scottish Episcopal bishop and historian.

== Life ==
Born at Uras in Kincardineshire, Scotland, on 7 February 1681, he was the second son of Alexander Keith and Marjory Keith (née Arbuthnot). He was educated at Marischal College, Aberdeen between 1695 and 1699; graduating with an A.M. in about 1700.

He was preceptor to George, Lord Keith (afterward the last Earl Marischal) from July 1703 to July 1710, and to his brother, James Keith. He was ordained a deacon on 16 August 1710, and from November 1710 to February 1713, he was domestic chaplain to Charles Hay, 13th Earl of Erroll and his mother Anne, the Dowager Countess. Three years later, he was ordained to the priesthood on 26 May 1713. On the same day, he was appointed curate at Barrenger's Close meeting-house in Edinburgh, and in 1733 he became Incumbent of the meeting-house; a post he kept until his death.

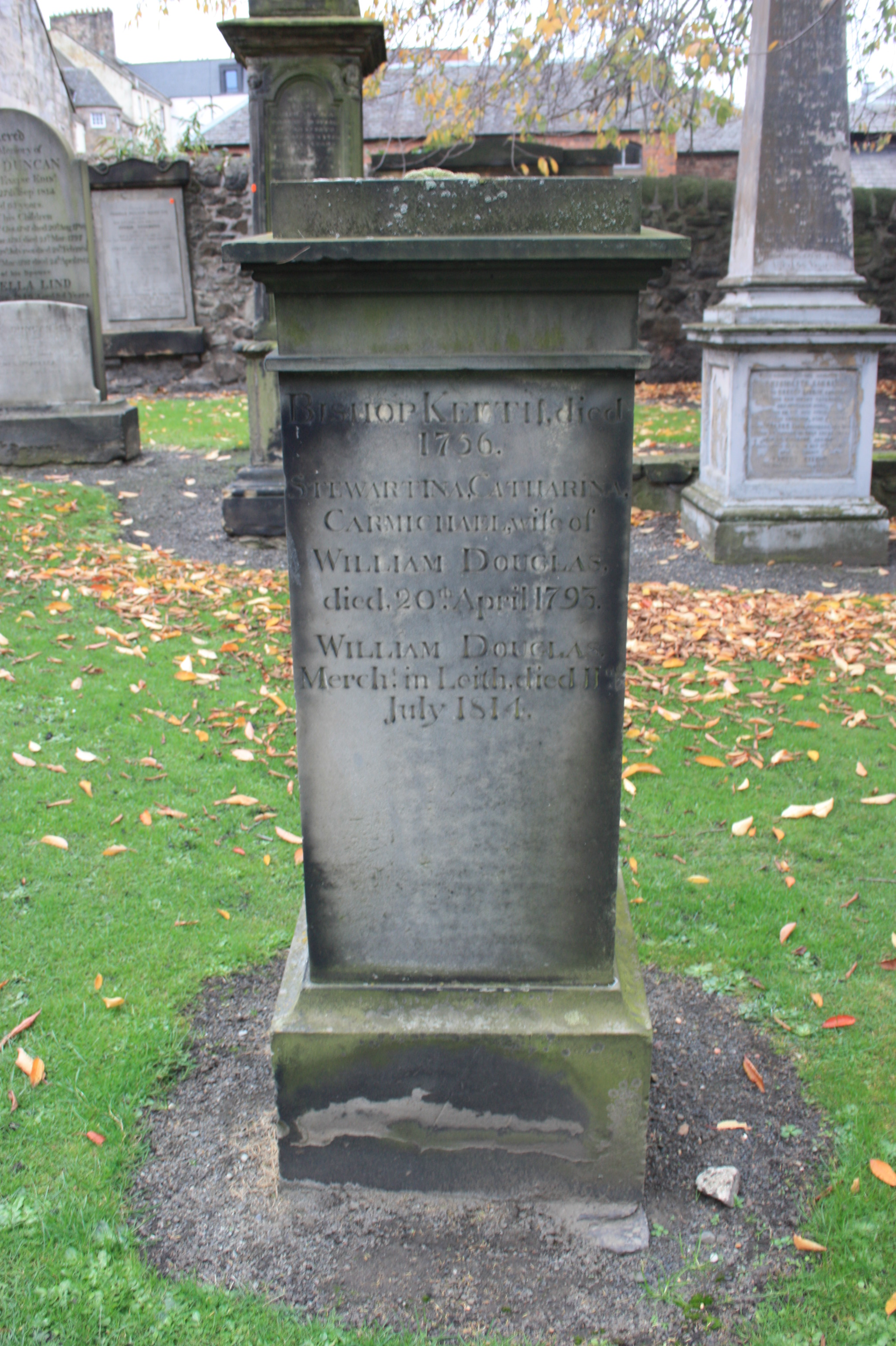
The grave of Bishop Robert Keith, Canongate Kirkyard, Edinburgh

In 1716, he and other clergy in Edinburgh were prosecuted by the Commission of the Justiciary for not praying for King George I. He was prohibited from the ministry and fined.

In 1719, he married Isobel Cameron, daughter of the Reverend John Cameron, Incumbent of Kincardine-in-Menteith. They had two children: an unnamed daughter (died before 1757), and Catharine who married Stewart Carmichael, an Edinburgh merchant, in 1752.

In March 1720, he was one of the clergy of Edinburgh who met to elect Arthur Ross's successor.

In 1727, he was appointed coadjutor to the Bishop of Edinburgh, and consecrated to the Episcopate at Edinburgh on 18 June 1727. His consecrators were bishops Arthur Millar and Thomas Rattray.

Four years later, he was appointed Bishop of Caithness, Orkney and The Isles in December 1731. Between 1733 and 1743, he was also Bishop of Fife. He was elected Primus of the Scottish Episcopal Church on 20 August 1743.

He was deeply versed in archeology, numismatics and Scottish antiquities. His published works include History of the Affairs of Church and State in Scotland and An Historical Catalogue of the Bishops of Scotland.

He died in Leith on 20 January 1757, aged 75. He is buried in Canongate Churchyard on the Royal Mile in Edinburgh. The grave lies slightly west of the church.

== See also ==
- Clan Keith
