= Daniel Sandford =

Daniel Sandford may refer to:

- Daniel Sandford (Bishop of Edinburgh) (1766–1830), Bishop of Edinburgh, 1806–1830
- Daniel Sandford (Bishop of Tasmania) (1831–1906), grandson of the Bishop of Edinburgh
- Daniel Sandford (British Army officer) (1882–1972), brigadier in the British army who became an advisor to Haile Selassie I of Ethiopia
- Daniel Sandford (journalist) (born 1966), BBC Home Affairs Correspondent
- Daniel Sandford (scholar) (1798–1838), Scottish politician and Greek scholar
