= Baron Sandford =

Extinct barony in the Peerage of the United Kingdom

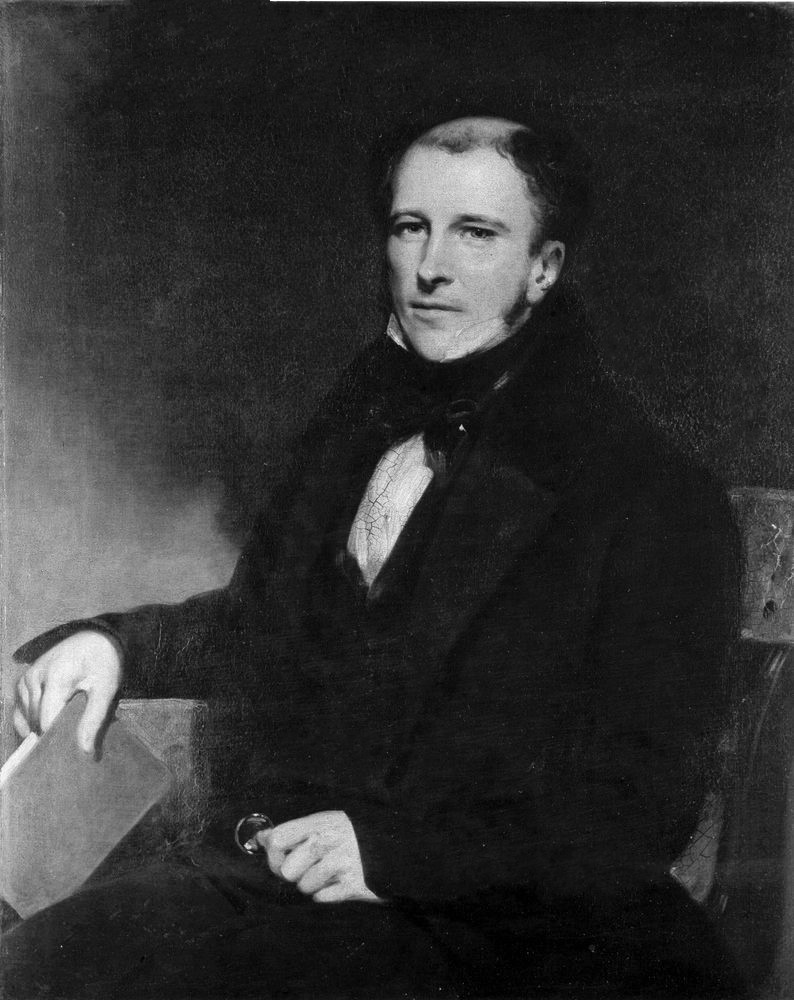
Sir Daniel Sandford, father of Francis Sandford, 1st Baron Sandford.

Baron Sandford is a title that has been created twice, both times in the Peerage of the United Kingdom. The first creation came in 1891 when Sir Francis Sandford, a civil servant who played an important role in the implementation of the Elementary Education Act 1870, was made Baron Sandford, of Sandford in the County of Salop. He was the son of Sir Daniel Sandford, politician and Greek scholar, the grandson of Daniel Sandford, Bishop of Edinburgh, the brother of Daniel Sandford, Bishop of Tasmania, and the first cousin of Charles Sandford, Bishop of Gibraltar. He was childless and the title became extinct on his death in 1893.

The second creation came in 1945 when the Conservative politician Sir James Edmondson was created Baron Sandford, of Banbury in the County of Oxford. Lord Sandford was son of James Edmondson who amassed a fortune building new communities in the London commuter belt. The family had originally been farmers in Cumbria. Lord Sandford had previously represented Banbury in the House of Commons and served as Vice-Chamberlain of the Household from 1939 to 1942 and as Treasurer of the Household from 1942 to 1945. He was succeeded by his son, the second Baron. He at first served in the Royal Navy but later became a priest. Lord Sandford also served in minor positions in the Conservative government of Edward Heath. As of 2012 the title is held by the latter's son, the third Baron, who succeeded in 2009.

== Barons Sandford; First Creation (1891) ==
- Francis Richard John Sandford, 1st Baron Sandford (1824–1893)

== Barons Sandford; Second Creation (1945) ==
- (Albert) James Edmondson, 1st Baron Sandford (1886–1959)
- John Cyril Edmondson, 2nd Baron Sandford (1920–2009)
- James John Mowbray Edmondson, 3rd Baron Sandford (b. 1949)

The heir apparent is the present holder's son the Hon. Devon John Edmondson (b. 1986)

== Arms ==
Coat of arms of Baron Sandford

Crest
In front of a portcullis Or a dexter arm embowed in armour fesswise the hand clenched Proper.
Escutcheon
Azure a cross couped and pointed between in chief two lions combatant and in base as many swans' wings elevated and addorsed respectant all Or.
Supporters
On either side a pikeman of the Honourable Artillery Company armed and accoutred supporting with the exterior hand a pike erect Proper the dexter charged with a portcullis chained Or and the sinister with an oak tree eradicated and fructed also Proper the trunk pierced by three arrows Or flighted Azure (the badge of the Edmonson family).
Motto
Cuicunque Ferienti Aperietur
