= 95th Siege Battery, Royal Garrison Artillery =

95th Siege Battery, RGA
- Cap Badge of the Royal Regiment of Artillery
- Active: 16 December 1915–1919
- Country: United Kingdom
- Branch: British Army
- Role: Siege Artillery
- Part of: Royal Garrison Artillery
- Garrison/HQ: Liverpool
- Engagements: Battle of the Somme; Battle of Vimy Ridge; Battle of Passchendaele; German Spring Offensive; Hundred Days Offensive

95th Siege Battery was a heavy howitzer unit of Britain's Royal Garrison Artillery (RGA) raised during World War I. It manned heavy howitzers on the Western Front from 1916 to 1918, beginning with the Attack on the Gommecourt Salient on the First day on the Somme. It then served at Vimy Ridge and Ypres, against the German Spring Offensive and in the final Allied Hundred Days Offensive.

== Mobilisation ==
On the outbreak of war in August 1914, units of the part-time Territorial Force (TF) were invited to volunteer for Overseas Service and most of the Lancashire and Cheshire Royal Garrison Artillery (L&CRGA) did so. This unit had mobilised as part of No 24 Coastal Fire Command, responsible for the defence of Liverpool, Barrow-in-Furness and the Mersey Estuary.

By October 1914, the campaign on the Western Front was bogging down into Trench warfare and there was an urgent need for batteries of siege artillery to be sent to France. The WO decided that the TF coastal gunners were well enough trained to take over many of the duties in the coastal defences, releasing Regular RGA gunners for service in the field, Soon the TF RGA companies that had volunteered for overseas service were also supplying trained gunners to RGA units serving overseas and providing cadres to form complete new units.

According to WO Instruction No 181 of 16 December 1915, 95th Siege Battery was to be formed at Portsmouth from a cadre of 3 officers and 78 other ranks (the equivalent of a TF Company) drawn from the L&CRGA. The L&CRGA cadre was assembled in January 1916 at Crosby Battery under the command of Captain J.E. Wheeler (No 3 Company) with lieutenants T.S. Paterson (No 5 Co) and R.W. Balfour (No 8 Co). After the battery was formed at Portsmouth, it moved to Horsham for training.

The battery went out to the Western Front on 25 May 1916 equipped with four 9.2-inch howitzers with Major Francis Twiss as officer commanding (OC). It joined VII Corps of Third Army to begin the bombardment for the Attack on the Gommecourt Salient in the forthcoming 'Bug Push' (the Battle of the Somme.

== Service ==
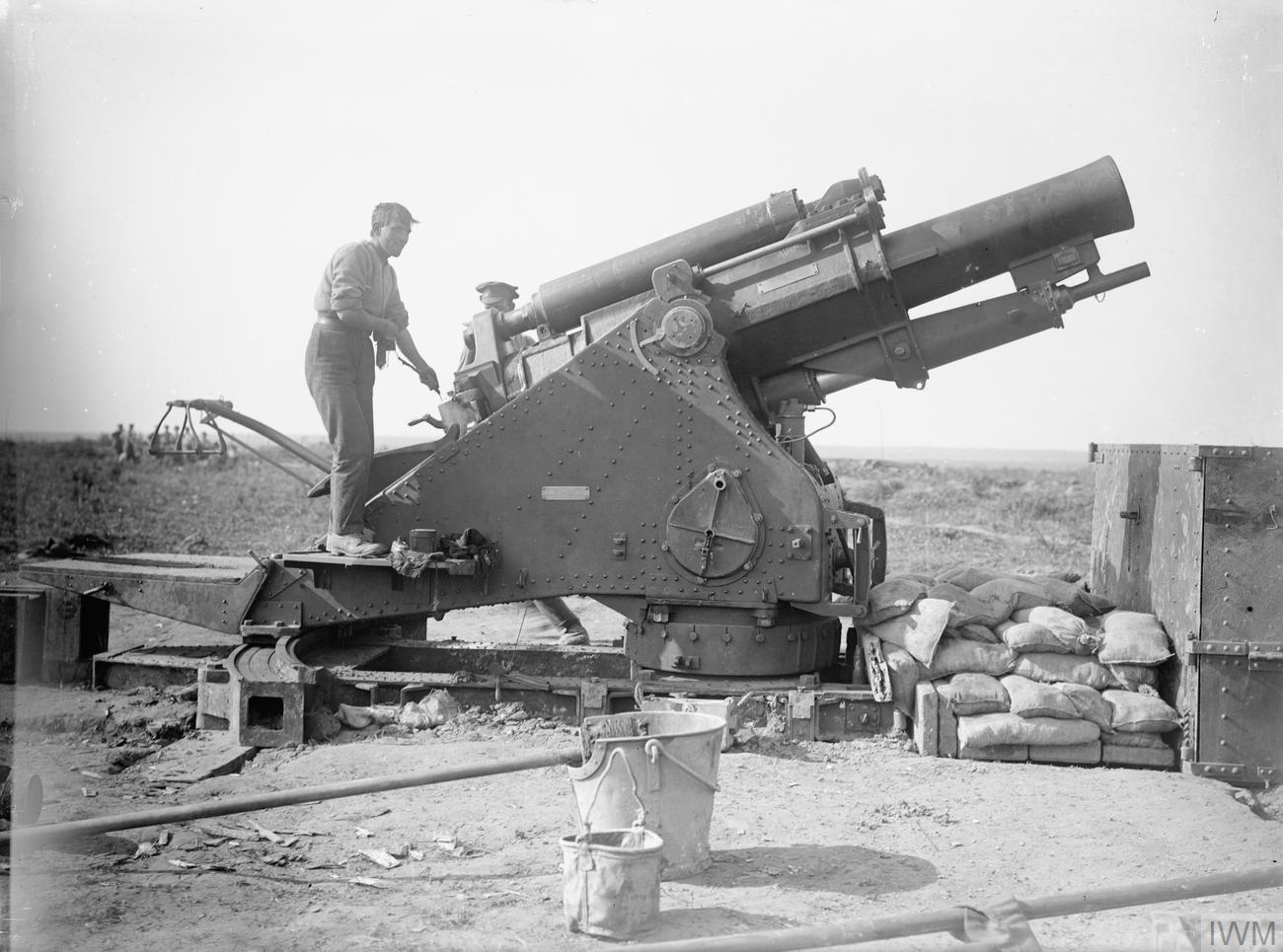
9.2-inch howitzer in action on the Somme, 1916.

=== Somme ===
The battery formed part of 35th Heavy Artillery Group (HAG), (Note: RGA brigades had recently been redesignated Heavy Artillery Groups, and did not have a fixed organisation, batteries being attached as required.) being grouped with 93rd and 94th Siege Btys to make up No 2 Sub-group of 12 x 9.2-inch howitzers at Bayencourt. The sub-group's main role was to use the high-angle fire of its howitzers to bombard German trenches and strongpoints facing 56th (1/1st London) Division's attack frontage on the south side of the Gommecourt salient. The specific targets assigned to 95th Siege Bty were around Gommecourt Village, Chateau and Park; 500 rounds per gun had been stockpiled.

The bombardment programme was planned to spread over five days, U, V, W, X and Y, before the assault was launched on Z day. 95th Siege Bty opened fire on V day (25 June) with an allowance of 50 shells per gun per day (70 for Y day). At all times during daylight, No 8 Squadron Royal Flying Corps had a BE2c observation aircraft in the air spotting fall of shot for the batteries. Because of poor weather for observation on Y day, the attack was postponed for two days, and the additional days (Y1 and Y2) were used for further bombardment, the ammunition having to be rationed accordingly. Overall, the damage caused to the German positions was insufficient to suppress the defenders.

On Z Day (1 July, the First day on the Somme), the entire artillery supporting 56th Division fired a 65-minute bombardment of the German front, starting at 06.25, with the 9.2-inch batteries firing as fast as was possible. At 07.30 the guns lifted onto their pre-arranged targets in the German support and reserve lines as the infantry got out of their forward trenches and advanced towards Gommecourt. At first all went well for 56th Division. Despite casualties from the German counter-bombardment on their jumping-off trenches, the smoke and morning mist helped the infantry. They reached the German front line with little loss and moved on towards the second and reserve lines. The Forward Observation Officers (FOOs) in their observation posts (OPs) reported the signboards erected by the leading waves to mark their progress. However, the OPs themselves came under fire from the German guns, which laid a barrage across No man's land preventing supplies and reinforcements from reaching the leading infantry waves who had entered the German trenches. The OPs' telephone lines were continually cut by shellfire. By midday, the Germans were launching concerted counter-attacks from all directions, and by mid-afternoon 56th Division's slight gains were being eroded; they all had to be abandoned after dark.

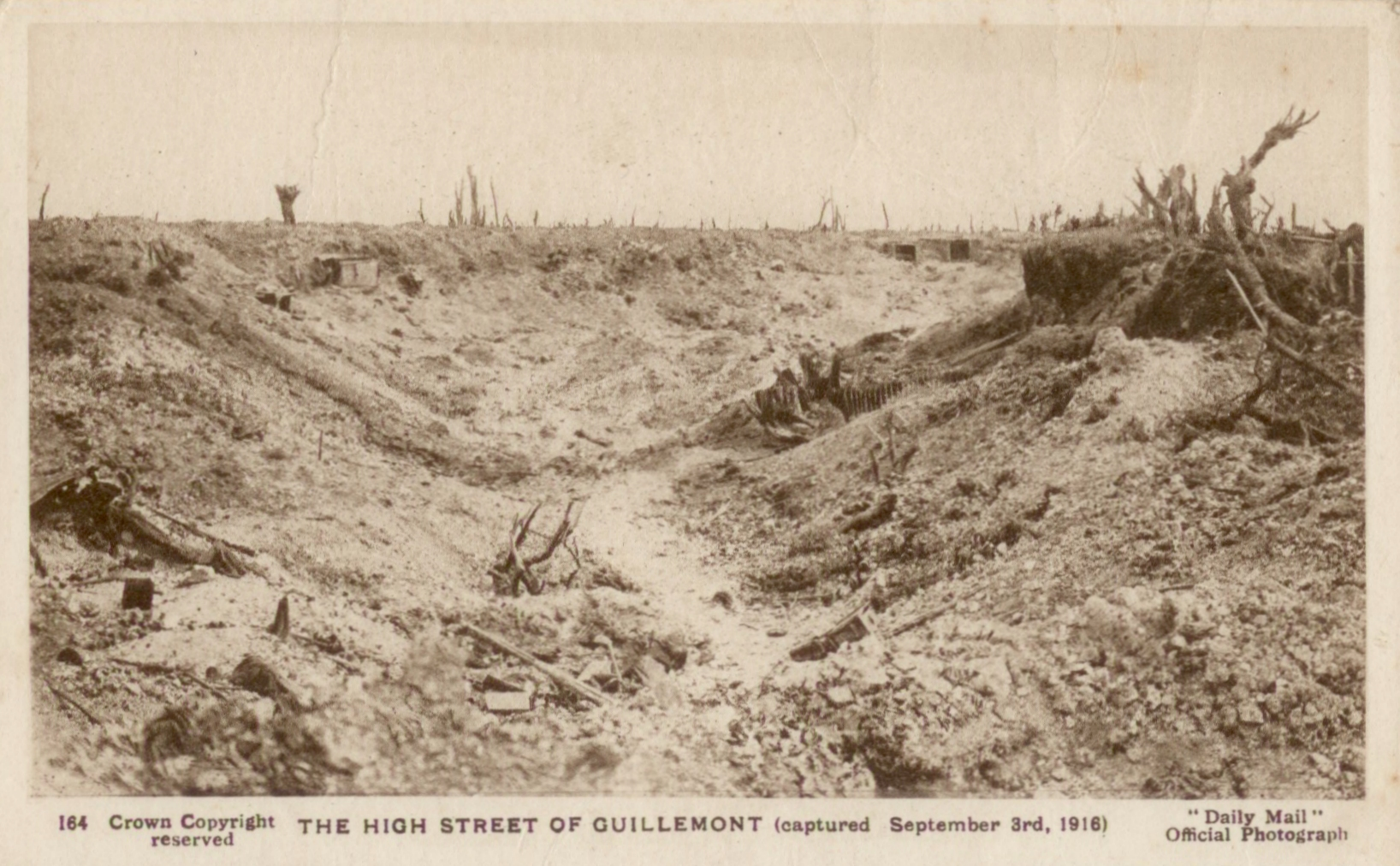
The ruins of Guillemont after its capture on 3 September 1916.

VII Corps' costly attack was only a diversion from the main BEF attack further south, and was not renewed after the first day. A truce was observed at Gommecourt on 2 July to allow both sides to collect their wounded. 95th Siege Bty transferred to the command of 46th HAG on 5 July, and then on 25 July it moved to 28th HAG, which was taking over at Maricourt in Fourth Army's sector for the continuation of the Somme offensive. The battery registered its guns in their new positions, and then from 31 July to 2 August it took part in a bombardment of Guillemont, where XIII Corps was attacking. Afterwards it carried out counter-battery (CB) fire with observation aircraft, and responded to SOS calls when German counter-attacks were reported. Another attempt on Guillemont was made on 8 August, with the heavy artillery bombarding the village once more and then providing protective barrages when the infantry attacked, but it was another failure. A 36-hour artillery preparation for a further attack on Guillemont by XIV Corps began on 17 August, but the smoke and dust continued to make observation difficult. The rate of fire did not quicken before Zero hour, so as not to warn the enemy of the attack, which went in at 14.45 on 18 August; XIV Corps advanced to the edge of the village and consolidated its gains next day.

28th HAG resumed CB fire and bombarding strongpoints. The final capture of Guillemont came on 3 September after 95th Siege Bty and other heavy artillery had spent the preceding days shelling the southern end of the village and trenches nearby. The troublesome Falfemont Farm strongpoint was taken early on 5 September. The batteries immediately began preparation for the next planned operation, the Battle of Flers–Courcelette on 15 September, even though no suitable positions could be found to move the guns forward and shorten the range. XIV Corps attacked at 06.20 with Guards and 56th (1/1st London) Divisions after the heavy artillery had maintained a continuous bombardment throughout the night of 14/15 September. Despite heavy casualties, the Guards reached their first and second objectives, but could not get on to the third. The 56th, tasked with forming a defensive flank, was mostly successful, but the Quadrilateral strongpoint held out against them.

Fighting continued in the area for several days. On 21 September 95th Siege Bty registered on Morval, and then took part in the bombardment for the Battle of Morval on 25–8 September, during which the Guards captured Lesbœufs. The last of the German main defences had been taken, and their batteries were seen to be pulling back to new positions. 95th Siege Bty then targeted Le Transloy for the Battle of the Transloy Ridges, beginning on 1 October. Fourth Army began a deliberate bombardment at 07.00, and there was no increase in the rate of fire until the infantry went over the top at 15.15, when an hour's intensive fire commenced. Bad weather then slowed progress. The battery was transferred to the command of to 31st HAG on 5 October but the targets did not change: Le Transloy cemetery, and specified strongpoints and trenches, such as Zenith Trench. Results were not good, because communications with the OPs were continually being cut (31st HAG reported on 27 October: 'Same Tasks and same results'). On 28 October 31st HAG HQ was relieved by 6th HAG, taking over command of 95th Siege Bty in position, as the Somme offensive died away in a series of attacks on the Butte de Warlencourt. By now the battery had been advanced to Maricourt and then to Guillemont. On 10 November a chance shell hit the officer's mess (a shack a couple of hundred yards behind the guns) killing Capt Wheeler, Lt Paterson, and 2/Lt F.W. Squires. (Note: All three are buried in Guillemont Road Cemetery.) The sole remaining L&CRGA officer, Capt Balfour, later became OC with the rank of major.

The front was rearranged at the end of the year. XV Corps took over part of the line from the French Army and 18th HAG HQ was brought in to command the heavy artillery moving into the French gun positions; 95th Siege Bty joined it on 3 December. Although the front was generally quiet, the battery still came under CB fire in its new positions on 14 December.

=== Vimy ===
95th Siege Bty was ordered to pull its guns out on the night of 6/7 February 1917, immediately after firing its allocation of shells in a scheduled bombardment. The gunners found the move extremely difficult because of the hard frost. The battery then moved via Amiens to join 70th HAG with First Army. However, it transferred to 50th (South African) HAG on 27 February, almost immediately after arriving.

First Army was preparing for the Battle of Vimy Ridge to open the Arras Offensive, with 50th (SA) HAG deployed at Marœuil Wood supporting Canadian Corps. 50th (SA) HAG's batteries carried out CB tasks and supported trench raids by Canadian troops. On 1 April they supported a raid by 34th Division, and silenced the hostile batteries around Bailleul-Sir-Berthoult. The artillery preparation for the battle was highly successful, with most German batteries destroyed or neutralised. The attack went in at 05.30 on 9 April with a heavy barrage and bombardment; the Canadians overran three lines of German trenches and seized the crest of the ridge where the battery established an OP for the following morning's shoot. Vimy village and other targets were bombarded over the days following the attack. On 14 April the gunners of 95th Siege Bty turned round two captured '8-inch howitzers' (probably 21 cm Mörser 16 or the equivalent) and fired them against the enemy.

50th (SA) HAG prepared to move forward, so on 15 April 95th Siege Bty reverted to the command of 70th HAG around nearby Anzin-Saint-Aubin. However, the offensive was now concentrated away from Vimy, so the battery was ordered to 87th HAG on 20 April and moved out on 24 April. 87th HAG was with XI Corps at Beuvry, in front of Aubers Ridge and Fromelles. On arrival the battery received the codename 'AGUN' and was emplaced as two 2-gun sections, north and south. However, this was a quiet sector, and on 30 May it was sent north to join Second Army, which was preparing for the Battle of Messines.

=== Ypres ===
95th Siege Bty joined 88th HAG supporting VIII Corps and its guns were positioned in the gardens of 'Goldfish Chateau' west of Ypres. Although VIII Corps was not scheduled to attack, its artillery assisted the preparations with CB fire north of the sector to be attacked. Once the assault had been delivered on 7 June, VIII Corps was withdrawn and on 13 June the battery transferred to 57th HAG with II Corps in the Ypres Salient under Fifth Army.

The newly-selected HQ and battery positions at St Jean, north-east of Ypres, were already under enemy CB fire. As troops and artillery were massed for the forthcoming Third Ypres Offensive, 95th Siege Bty transferred to XIX Corps, first with 90th HAG on 19 June and then on 26 June under 70th HAG which had just arrived. For this offensive the battery was assigned to C Subgroup of the Northern Counter-Battery Group, beginning the preparation on 1 July. The CB shoots were carried out with observation by aircraft or Kite balloon when German aircraft did not interfere, otherwise by 'map' shoots. German retaliation was fierce – the battery lost about 100 cartridges and fuzes burnt on 2 July after it came under fire. Firing continued through the month.

The delayed attack (the Battle of Pilckem Ridge) was launched on 31 July. The elaborate CB preparations had been largely effective, and the initial German defence barrage was weak, but more and more hostile batteries came into play as the action progressed. XIX Corps made a good start and reached its second objective, but the reserve brigades advancing towards the third objective were held up by field guns and machine guns in undestroyed emplacements. Counter-attacks in the afternoon took back some of the ground, and heavy rain in the evening halted any further moves. The batteries continued firing before the next major attack (the Battle of Langemarck). 95th Siege Bty suffered serious casualties during this period, with 14 men killed between 1 and 5 August. The assault went in on 16 August, but the weakened divisions of XIX Corps made almost no progress. Lower-intensity fighting continued throughout August before responsibility for continuing the offensive was shifted to Second Army

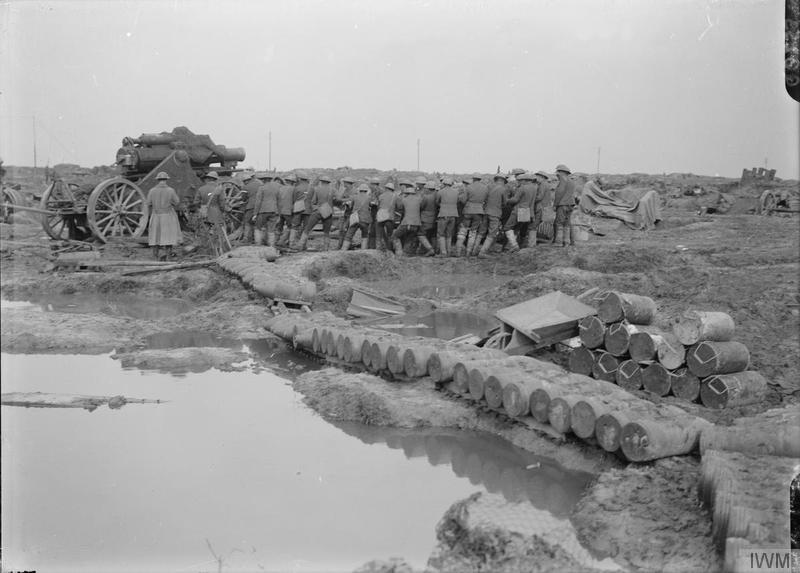
Positioning a 9.2-inch howitzer and its ammunition in the mud of the Ypres Salient, 1917.

95th Siege Bty was joined on 28 August by a section from 419th Siege Bty, preparatory to the battery being increased to six howitzers. However the extra guns did not arrive until the following January. (Note: 419th Siege Bty had been formed on 10 April 1917 at Prees Heath Camp and the personnel went out to the Western Front on 21 August. One section joined XIX Corps and was posted to 95th Siege Bty, the other went to II Corps and was posted to 118th Siege Bty.)

As part of the reorganisation of Fifth Army's front, the exhausted 95th Siege Bty was transferred to 59th HAG with VI Corps in Third Army, being replaced by personnel from a fresher battery. The first echelon of the battery arrived at the quiet area of Saint-Léger on 8 September. After taking over the guns in position the section began routine firing for Third Army, responding to SOS calls, covering trench raids etc. The rest of the battery arrived on 23 September. On 26 September, 59th HAG's HQ exchanged with that of 58th HAG from Fifth Army and moved into the headquarters at Ervillers. The batteries continued CB fire with aircraft observation. The howitzers that 95th Siege Bty had taken over were so worn that their firing had become erratic.

=== Winter 1917–18 ===
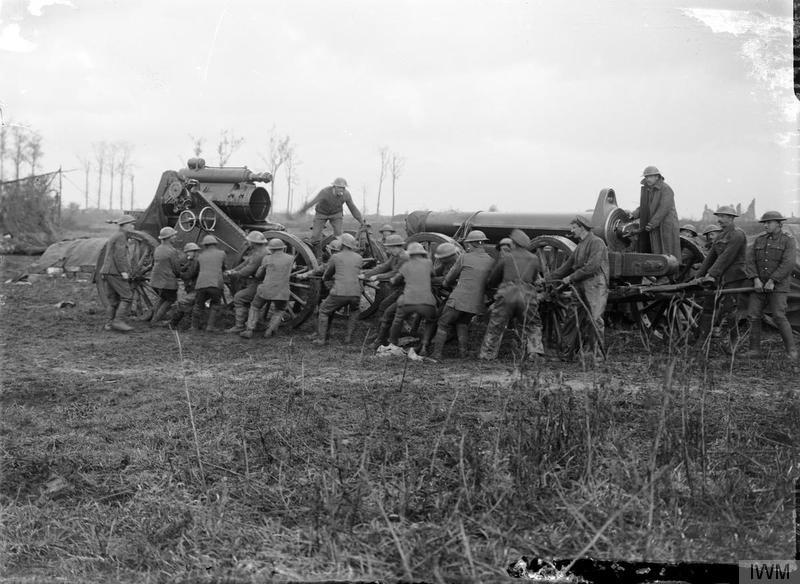
Moving a 9.2-inch howitzer on its travelling carriage, 1917.

On 24 October the battery returned to the command of 90th HAG. It passed to 71st HAG on 14 November while 90th HAG HQ moved to the Cambrai sector, and then followed to rejoin 90th HAG at Beugny and began to emplace its guns on 26 November. 71st HAG took it over again on 30 November when it went to Havrincourt to support the continuing operations of the Battle of Cambrai. It finally returned to 90th HAG's command on 3 December, coming under IV Corps on 15 December. After calibrating its guns, the battery took part in repelling some German attacks around Bullecourt. While the battery was completing a 300-round shoot, No 4 gun suffered a premature detonation in the barrel, destroying the gun and killing the gun detachment. It was not clear whether this had been caused by a dirty or faulty shell, or by the wear on the gun's bore. A week or so later, Maj Balfour died of pneumonia in hospital at Grévillers. (Note: Balfour is buried in Grévillers British Cemetery)

By now HAG allocations were becoming more fixed, and during the winter they were converted into permanent RGA brigades. 90th HAG became 90th (9.2-inch Howitzer) Bde, RGA, in January 1918, with 95th Siege Bty as the heavy component, along with three 6-inch howitzer batteries. The battery remained with 90th Bde for the rest of the war. Within the group the batteries were codenamed T1, T2 etc after the initial of Lieutenant-Colonel A.H. Thorp, the brigade commander. In contemporary signallers' phonetic code these were 'Toc 1', 'Toc 2', etc, with 95th Siege Bty assigned Toc 1. The battery's sign was a skull and crossbones. (Note: 90th Brigade's adjutant, Capt Arthur Behrend, was a member of a family prominent in the L&CRGA, and served with that unit postwar.)

On 5 January 1918 95th Siege Bty pulled its old 9.2-inch howitzers out and returned them to the base; on 12 January it was rearmed with six new Mark II howitzers. Major Robert Pargiter (Note: Later Major-General Anti-Aircraft at Allied Forces HQ under General Eisenhower in the North African Campaign of World War II. In January 1918 he was returning to active service after suffering a severe wound while commanding a mountain battery on the North-West Frontier of India.)arrived to take command of the battery on 20 January, and for the next month took over 90th Bde temporarily while the brigade commander was away. The new guns were pulled into position beginning on the night of 31 January/1 February. The rear section of three guns registered theirs, and the brigade reported that the section's first shoot on 5 February was 'very successful'. The battery got its sixth gun pulled in near Vaulx by 21 February, but at the end of the month it pulled two out again and parked them. Many of the gunners were engaged in digging reserve positions ahead of the expected German offensive. At this point 95th Siege Bty's six howitzers were the only 9.2s supporting the whole of IV Corps' 12,000 yards (11,000 m) defensive frontage.

=== Spring Offensive ===
The German Spring Offensive opened on 21 March with an intense bombardment on Third Army's gun positions. 95th Siege Bty's gun positions were deeply dug and offered good protection, so casualties were low. 90th Brigade's guns replied with pre-arranged SOS barrages to support IV Corps' infantry in front (their planned counter-preparation barrages were abandoned because the Germany infantry advanced so quickly in the morning mist). Telephone lines were soon cut, and the only guns in contact with 90th Bde HQ and the brigade OP ('Tusculum') were a detached section of 95th Siege Bty ('Toc 6') behind Vaulx-Vraucourt. The rest of the battery ('Toc 1') was also firing at SOS targets, but its wireless had been destroyed and Maj Pargiter could only communicate with Bde HQ by runner.

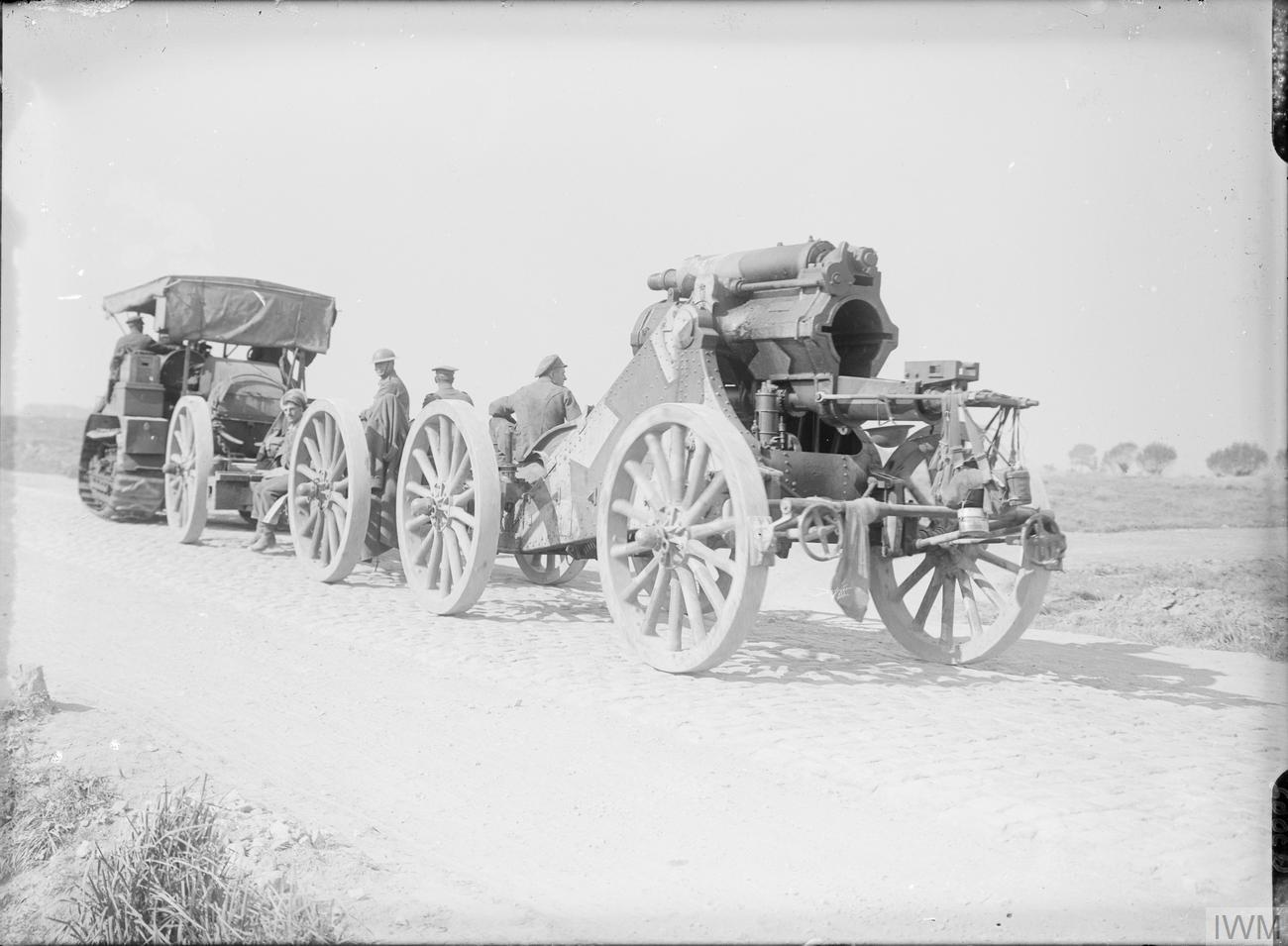
9.2-inch howitzer broken down into three loads for road movement.

By 12.10 the Tusculum OP was reporting that the enemy had broken through IV Corps' forward positions and was advancing through the Battle Zone past Lagnicourt. 25th Division, the corps reserve, manned the reserve line (the Brown Line) and the brigade (codenamed 'Dog') nearest to 95th Siege Bty reported that the Germans had already closed up to the wire in front of the Brown Line. At Dog's request 95th Siege Bty engaged two enemy batteries troubling the infantry. The battery then fired on Lagnicourt, where a brigade ('Dibs') of 6th Division reported German infantry massing. By 15.10 the enemy were in Vraucourt Copse, barely 2,000 yards (1,800 m) from Toc 6's guns, which were engaging them (the Germans thought that they were being fired on by their own guns).

Finally, just before nightfall, IV Corps Heavy Artillery ordered the batteries to retire. 95th Siege Bty began dismantling its 9.2s and hauling them onto the wagons, with the Holt 75 caterpillar tractors ('cats') standing by. They were sent off during the night to park the guns south-west of Arras. As 90th Bde's adjutant wrote, 'a moving battle was no place for such sluggish creatures as nine-twos: consequently Toc 1's and Toc 6's pieces were now crawling across the Somme en route for the very back of the front'. The new 9.2-inch howitzers were incomplete and the Army Service Corps (ASC) crews had to improvise couplings out of chains, consequently they towed erratically. While crossing Miraumont bridge on 22 March one of the carriages carrying a howitzer barrel ran over the side into the river. Despite their best efforts with a cat borrowed from an 8-inch battery that had lost its guns, the ASC could not recover it, finally abandoning it on 25 March when they came under machine gun fire from the advancing Germans. Major Pargiter was also refused permission to return to the battery positions to recover the steel firing beams.

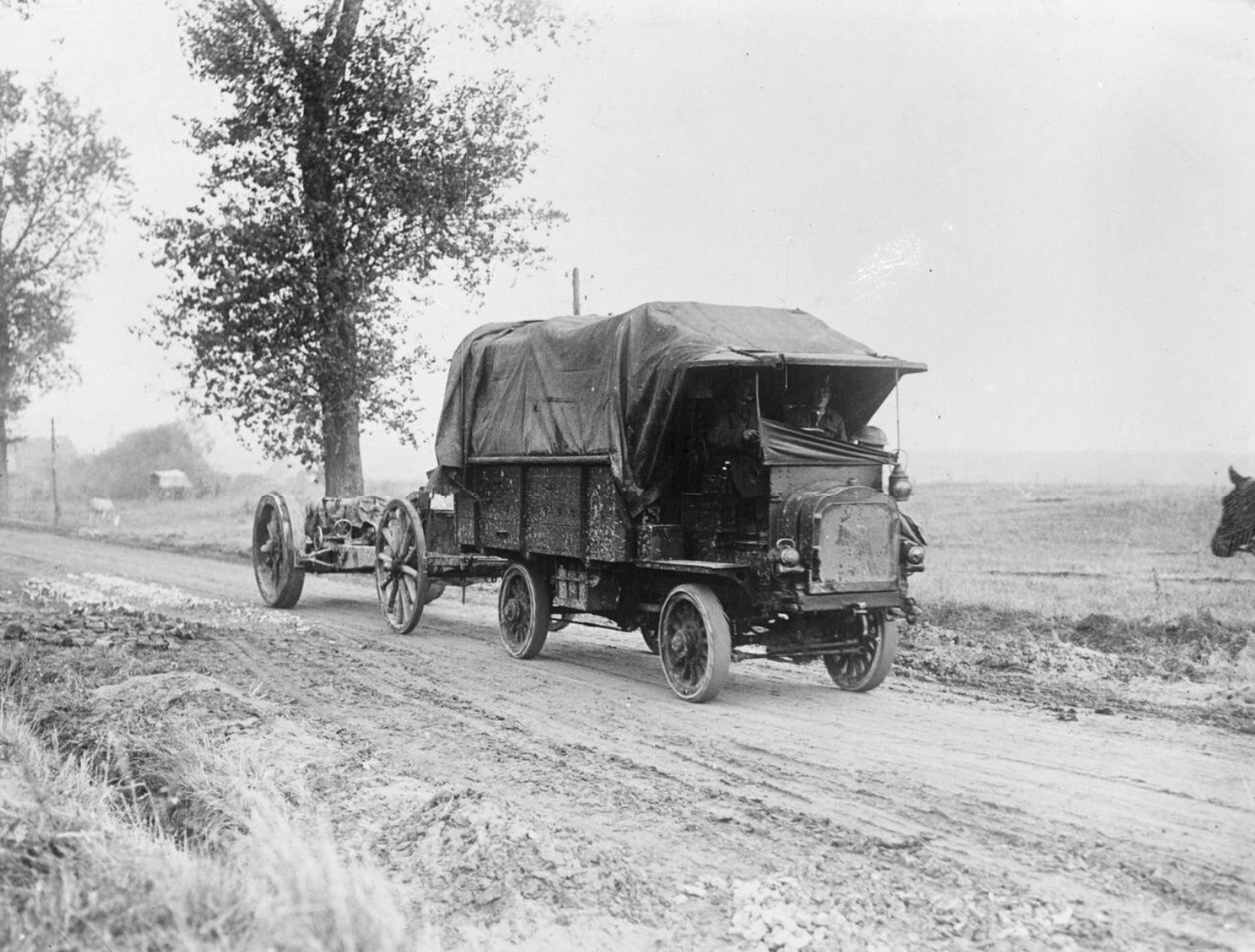
FWD Model B lorry towing a 6-inch 26 cwt howitzer, as used by 95th Sege Bty during the Great Retreat.

Meanwhile the officers and gunners of the battery were sent off to reinforce Toc 2, Toc 3 and Toc 4, all equipped with handier 6-inch howitzers that could move and fire during the retreat. Major Pargiter suggested that a better use of his men would be to detach one gun from each of the batteries and form a separate three-gun battery. This was done, and 95th Siege Bty manned 6-inch howitzers for the rest of the 'Great Retreat'. The three howitzers each had a FWD Model B four-wheel drive gun tractor, but at first there were no ammunition lorries. On 23 March the improvised battery was firing on Mory in support of Guards Division, but was down to 25 rounds per gun. During the retreat, all fuel, ammunition and rations had to be salvaged from supply dumps before they were destroyed to deny them to the advancing enemy. 90th Brigade retreated through Grévillers, Achiet-le-Petit, Bucquoy and Orville towards Doullens. 95th Siege Bty's FWDs were short of fuel so the men marched, but one of the howitzers had to be abandoned on 26 March when its tractor ran out of fuel and a single FWD could not tow two guns. (The abandoned howitzer was later collected by a horse-drawn battery.) On reaching Pas-en-Artois, the gunners were ordered to line the heights with their rifles to defend the town, where a corps HQ was pulling out. (The battery claimed that staff officers commandeered one of its few ammunition lorries to evacuate their personal kit.) The brigade was then ordered to Mézerolles, west of Doullens, to refit, where 95th Siege Bty rejoined. After two days Maj Pargiter requested permission to go out with one FWD carrying 30 rounds and towing a gun to rejoin the action, but was refused. On 1 April 95th Siege Bty was reunited with its 9.2s positioned among railway sidings at Beaussart. By now Third Army line had been stabilised. 90th Brigade moved out to Bertrancourt in front of Doullens and began emplacing its guns 'in action' once more.

By now Third Army's line had been stabilised. 90th Brigade moved out to Betrancourt in front of Doullens and began emplacing its guns 'in action' once more. On 5 April the Germans made a final attack against Third Army (the Battle of the Ancre), preceded by gas shelling of the British artillery, but were easily repulsed. Apart from occasional 'strafes' by German guns on the battery positions, 90th Bde's frontage quietened down. The batteries continued their CB fire, with 95th Siege Bty widely spread: while Battery HQ was at Bayencourt, Nos 5 and 6 guns served for much of June at Souastre under 81st Bde and later 48th Bde.

=== Hundred Days Offensive ===
On 21 August Third Army joined in the Allied Hundred Days Offensive by attacking across the old Somme battlefields (the Battle of Albert). 95th Siege Bty had moved three 9.2s to Hébuterne during the preparations. 90th Brigade moved forward after the successful attack, with 95th Siege Bty moving to Bienvillers and then pushing pairs of howitzers up through Achiet-le-Grand to Bihucourt and Avesnes-lès-Bapaume by 31 August, leaving two in reserve. In the Second Battle of Bapaume (31 August–2 September), 90th Bde's guns supported New Zealand Division's recapture of Bapaume.

The subsequent advance in September and October entailed 95th Siege Bty hauling its howitzers forward in twos and threes to successive new positions. 90th Brigade supported 42nd (East Lancashire) Division for the attack on the Canal du Nord on 27 September and was attached to New Zealand Division for the Second Battle of Cambrai on 8 October. It supported IV Corps' attack at the Battle of the Selle on 20 October. The battery then parked four of its guns at Solesmes and pushed forward with just two to Pont a Pierre. By 5 November the heavy howitzers had been left behind as IV Corps pushed through the Forêt de Mormal, and the men were in billets when the Armistice with Germany came into effect on 11 November.

== Disbandment ==
90th Brigade advanced into Belgium and eventually into Germany as part of British Army of the Rhine where it was disbanded in 1919. 95th Siege Bty was left at Flesselles, near Amiens, with 5th Bde, RGA. In the interim order of battle for the postwar army published in May 1919 the battery was intended to form 120th Bty in XXX Bde, RGA, but this was rescinded after the signing of the Treaty of Versailles, and 95th Siege Bty battery was disbanded later in 1919.

The Commonwealth War Graves Commission records 40 men of the battery who died in service, but there may have been others listed simply as RGA (as was Capt Wheeler).

== See also ==
- Newsreel film of a 9.2-inch howitzer being fired
