= Erskine Douglas Sandford =

Scottish advocate and author (1793–1861)

Erskine Douglas Sandford (31 July 1793 – 4 September 1861) was a 19th-century Scottish advocate and legal author.

== Life ==
Sandford was born at 22 South Frederick Street in Edinburgh's New Town, then a new house, on 31 July 1793 the son of Helen Frances Catherine Douglas and her husband, Bishop Daniel Sandford.

After studying law, Sandford passed the Scottish bar as an advocate in 1816.

In 1828 Sandford was elected a Fellow of the Royal Society of Edinburgh his proposer being George Augustus Borthwick. At this time he was living with his family at 25 Heriot Row.

In 1828 Sandford was involved in the trial of William Burke and Helen McDougal for the Burke and Hare Murders. When travelling on a mailcoach in 1829, he realised that one of his fellow passengers was in fact a disguised William Hare (who had been granted immunity from prosecution). This was one of the last reliable sightings of Hare, whose eventual fate is unknown.

In 1833 Sandford replaced Adam Urquhart as Sheriff of Wigtown.

In 1837 Sandford is listed as one of the few contributors to the Scottish Episcopal Fund, a fund begun in 1806 to establish the Scottish Episcopalian Church.

Sandford lived his later life at 11 Randolph Crescent on the edge of the Moray Estate in western Edinburgh.

Sandford died at Alvechurch Rectory on 4 September 1861.

== Family ==
Sandford's uncles were Daniel Keyte Sandford and Francis Sandford, 1st Baron Sandford.

In 1829 Sandford married Joanna Grace Graham (d.1890). They had two daughters and three sons.

Sandford was uncle to Daniel Sandford (Bishop of Tasmania)

== Publications ==
- A Treatise on the History and Law of Entails in Scotland
- A Treatise on the Law of Heritable Succession in Scotland
