= Grincourt-lès-Pas =

- Commune
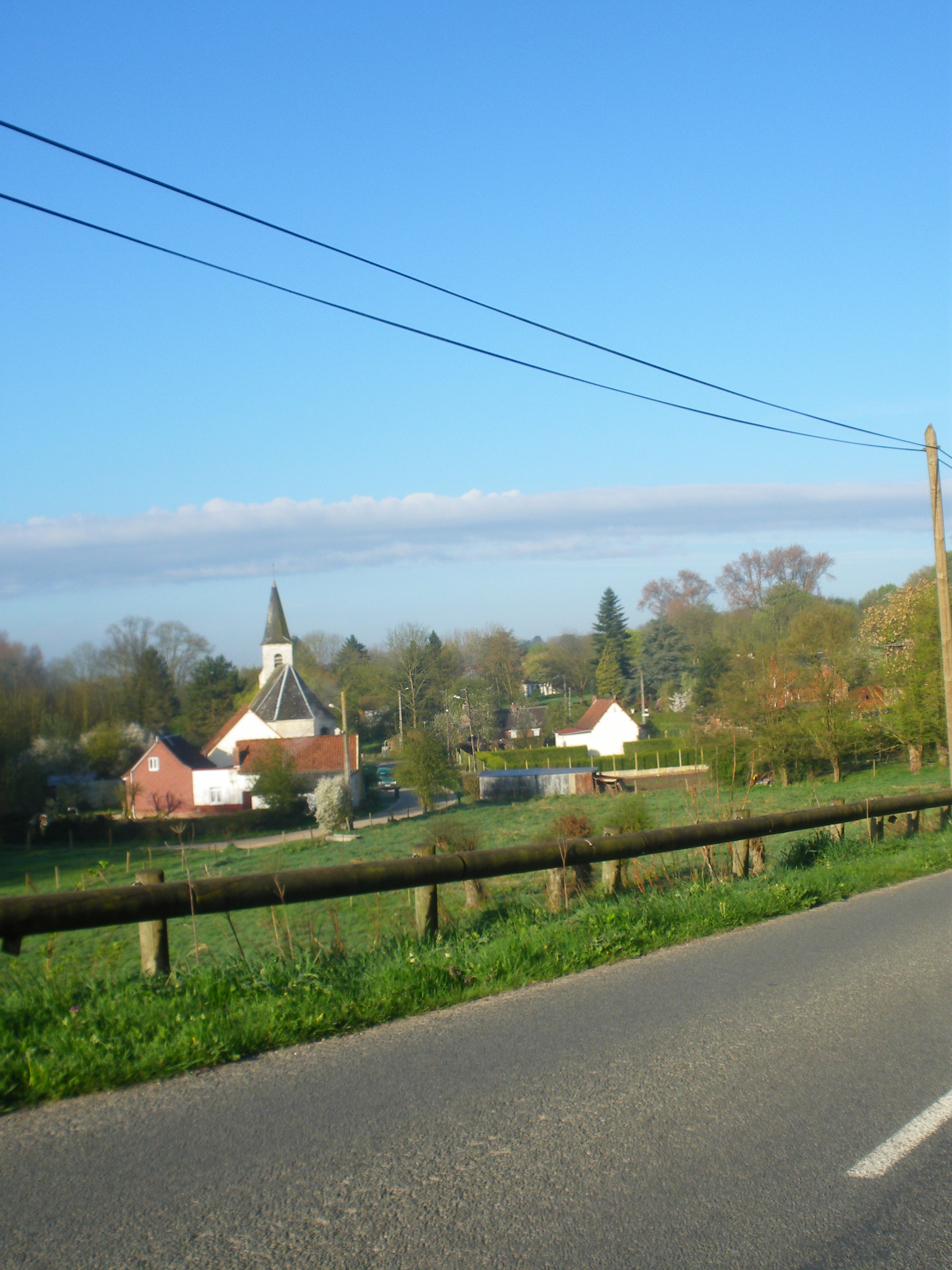
- A general view of Grincourt-lès-Pas

- Coat of arms
- Location of Grincourt-lès-Pas
- Location within France Location within Hauts-de-France
- Coordinates: 50°10′10″N 2°29′40″E
- Country: France
- Region: Hauts-de-France
- Department: Pas-de-Calais
- Arrondissement: Arras
- Canton: Avesnes-le-Comte
- Intercommunality: CC Campagnes de l'Artois

Government
  - Mayor (2020–2026): Benoît Francois
- Area^{1}: 2.79 km^{2} (1.08 sq mi)
- Elevation: 149 m (489 ft)
- Highest elevation: 166 m (545 ft)
- Lowest elevation: 100 m (330 ft)
- Population (2023): 32
  - Density: 11/km^{2} (30/sq mi)
- Time zone: UTC+01:00 (CET)
  - Summer (DST): UTC+02:00 (CEST)
- INSEE/Postal code: 62389 /62760
- ^{1} French Land Register data, which excludes lakes, ponds, glaciers > 1 km^{2} (0.386 sq mi or 247 acres) and river estuaries.

Grincourt-lès-Pas (French pronunciation: [ɡʁɛ̃kuʁ lɛ pa], literally Grincourt near Pas) is a commune in the Pas-de-Calais department in the Hauts-de-France region of France 2 kilometres (1.2 mi) north of Pas-en-Artois and 24 kilometres (15 mi) southwest of Arras.

== Population ==
Historical population
Year	Pop.	±% p.a.
1968	55	—
1975	45	−2.83%
1982	55	+2.91%
1990	55	+0.00%
1999	39	−3.75%
2007	42	+0.93%
2012	37	−2.50%
2017	30	−4.11%
2023	32	+1.08%
Source: INSEE

== See also ==
- Communes of the Pas-de-Calais department
