= Cecil White =

Cecil White may refer to:

- Cecil F. White (1900–1992), American politician
- Cecil White (footballer) (1860–1948), England international footballer
- Unk White (Cecil John White, 1900–1986), Australian cartoonist
