= Grix =

Grix is a surname. Notable people with this surname include:

- Francis Le Grix White (1819–1887), British vicar and geologist
- Scott Grix (born 1984), Irish rugby league footballer
- Simon Grix (born 1985), Irish rugby league footballer
