= Croxton, Staffordshire =

Village in Staffordshire, England

Coordinates: 52.885°N 2.317°W

Croxton is a village on the B5026 road, situated between Eccleshall and Loggerheads. Population details for the 2011 census can be found under Eccleshall. It is notable for having an old windmill. The village church is dedicated to St. Pauls.

== Notable residents ==
- Rev Francis Le Grix White (1819–1887) FRSE FGS geologist, was vicar of Croxton from 1857 to 1869.

== See also ==
- Listed buildings in Eccleshall
- Yarnfield
- Swynnerton
