= Francis Le Grix White =

British vicar and amateur geologist

Rev Francis Le Grix White FRSE FGS (1819–1887) was a 19th-century British vicar remembered as an amateur geologist.

== Life ==
He was descended from the Norman family of Le Grix de Neuville, and obtained a coat of arms to mark this.

He was born in 1819, the only son of John White of Culham Street in London. He was educated at Worcester College then studied law at Oxford University, becoming a barrister at the Middle Temple in 1844. He then took a change in direction, studying divinity at Oxford, and graduating BA in 1848 and MA in 1849.

In 1857 he became vicar of Croxton, Staffordshire remaining there to 1869. In 1872 he is listed as private chaplain to the Marquess of Drogheda.

In 1876 he was elected a Fellow of the Royal Society of Edinburgh. His proposers were Charles Neaves, Henry Cotterill, Daniel Sandford (his brother-in-law), and Andrew Wood.

He died on 17 May 1887 in Penrith.

== Family ==
In 1847, in Rothesay, he was married to Cecilia Catherine Charlotte Sandford (died 1898), daughter of Prof Daniel Sandford. They did not have any children. He was uncle to the footballer, Cecil Holden-White, who was an executor of his will.

== Publications ==
- Forgotten Seigneurs of the Alenconnais (1880)
