= Thomas McCulloch (sheriff) =

Early Sheriff of Wigtown

Sir Thomas McCulloch was an early Sheriff of Wigtown which was historically the office responsible for enforcing law and order in Wigtown, Scotland and bringing criminals to justice. Sir Thomas McCulloch was appointed Sheriff of Wigtown by 1305.

== Ragman Roll ==
Thomas' seal is one of 100s recorded on the Ragman Roll in 1296 which was an oath of fealty to Edward I of England at the start of the First War of Scottish Independence.

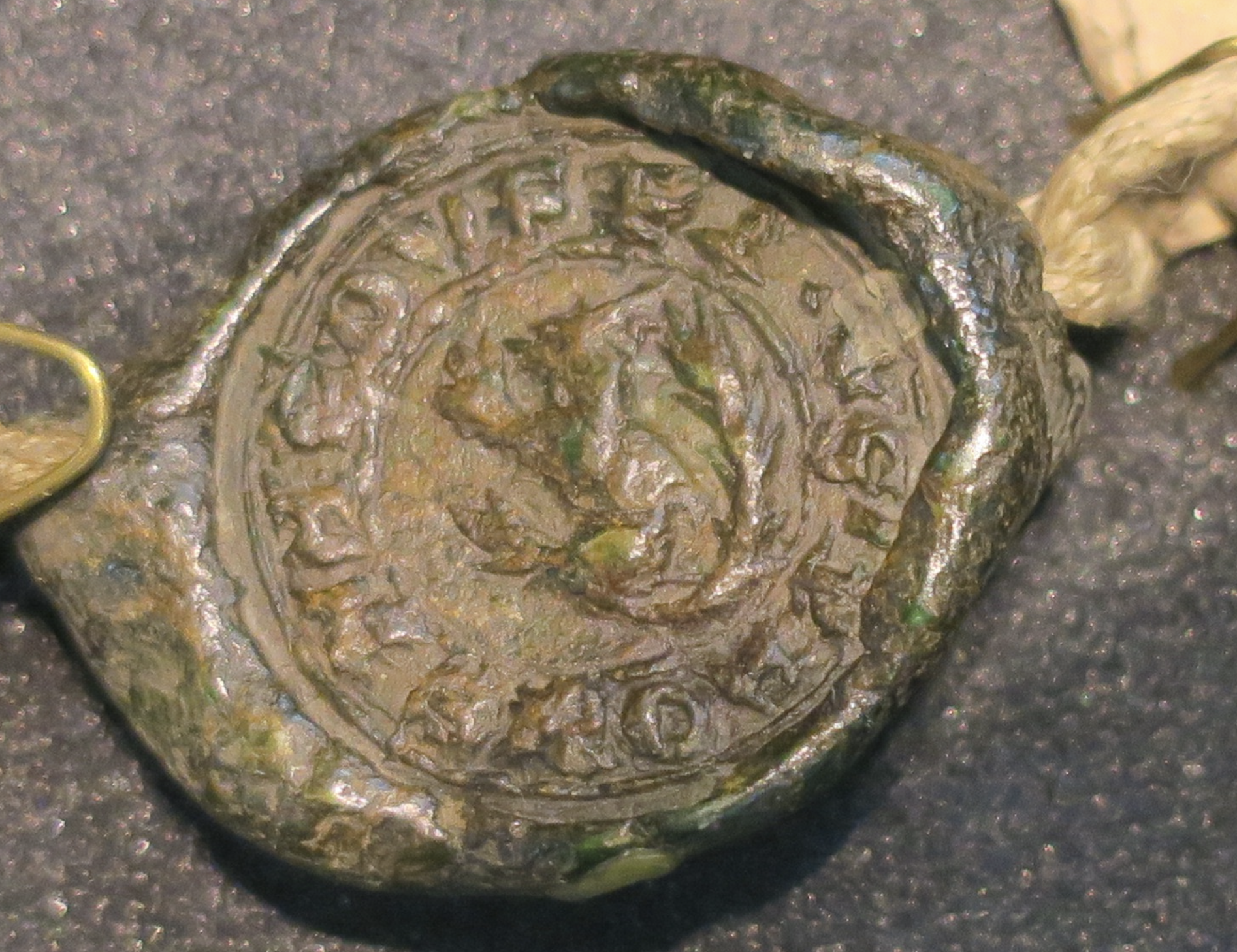
Sir Thomas McCulloch's seal on the Ragman Roll dated 1294.

The seal bears an image of a red squirrel.
