= Domhnall mac Cailein =

Domhnall mac Cailein or Donald Campbell was a 13th-14th century Scottish nobleman and the Sheriff of Wigtown.

== Life ==
According to Campbell tradition, Domhnall was the second son of Cailean Mór; however, contemporary evidence seems to suggest that Domhnall was the elder brother to Niall mac Cailein.

First mentioned in 1296, when he did homage to King Edward I of England at Dumbarton on 28 August 1296, his name is included on the Ragman Roll. He was on the side of the English in 1304 under the orders of John de Botetourt, Justiciar of Galloway, Annan, and the valley of the Nith. Domhnall was part of the jury that, on 31 August 1304, undertook an inquiry as to certain privileges claimed by Robert de Brus, Earl of Carrick. After switching over to the Scottish cause, Domhnall was a signatory to the Declaration of Arbroath. He received a grant of the half lands of Red Castle in the county of Forfar, and also lands of Benderloch in Lorne.

== Family and issue ==
Domhnall married Amabilla and had the following known issue;

- Duncan (d.1367), married the heiress Susanna Crawford of Loudon daughter of Reginald Crawford, and is the ancestor of the Campbells of Loudoun. Had issue.
