= Cecil Holden-White =

English footballer

Personal information
- Full name: Cecil Henry Holden-White
- Date of birth: 3 November 1860
- Place of birth: Kensington, London
- Date of death: 21 September 1934 (aged 73)
- Place of death: Kensington, London
- Position: Left half

Senior career*
Years	Team	Apps	(Gls)
- Corinthian

International career
1888	England	2	(0)
- * Club domestic league appearances and goals

Cecil Henry Holden-White (3 November 1860 – 21 September 1934) was an English international footballer, who played as a left half.

== Life ==
He was born in Harold House on Lansdown Road in Kensington, the son of Henry White (died 1900) and his Swiss wife, Eleanor D'Ouchy (died 1912). He attended Brentwood School. His father was a wine merchant, and founder of the rum merchants, Henry White & Company. Cecil originally trained as a wine merchant, and later took on his father's business.

As a footballer he first played for Clapham Rovers then Swifts.

White played for Corinthian F.C. from 1882 to 1891 and was their first captain. He earned two caps playing for England in 1888.

Later in his life, Cecil became a Master of the Worshipful Company of Vintners. At the time of his death, he was the proprietor of Henry White & Co., a rum importer.

== Family ==
He had a younger brother, Charles Henry Holden-White (1869–1948). He was nephew (or great nephew) of the geologist Rev Francis Le Grix White FRSE FGS, and was executor of his will.
