= Daniel Sandford (British Army officer) =

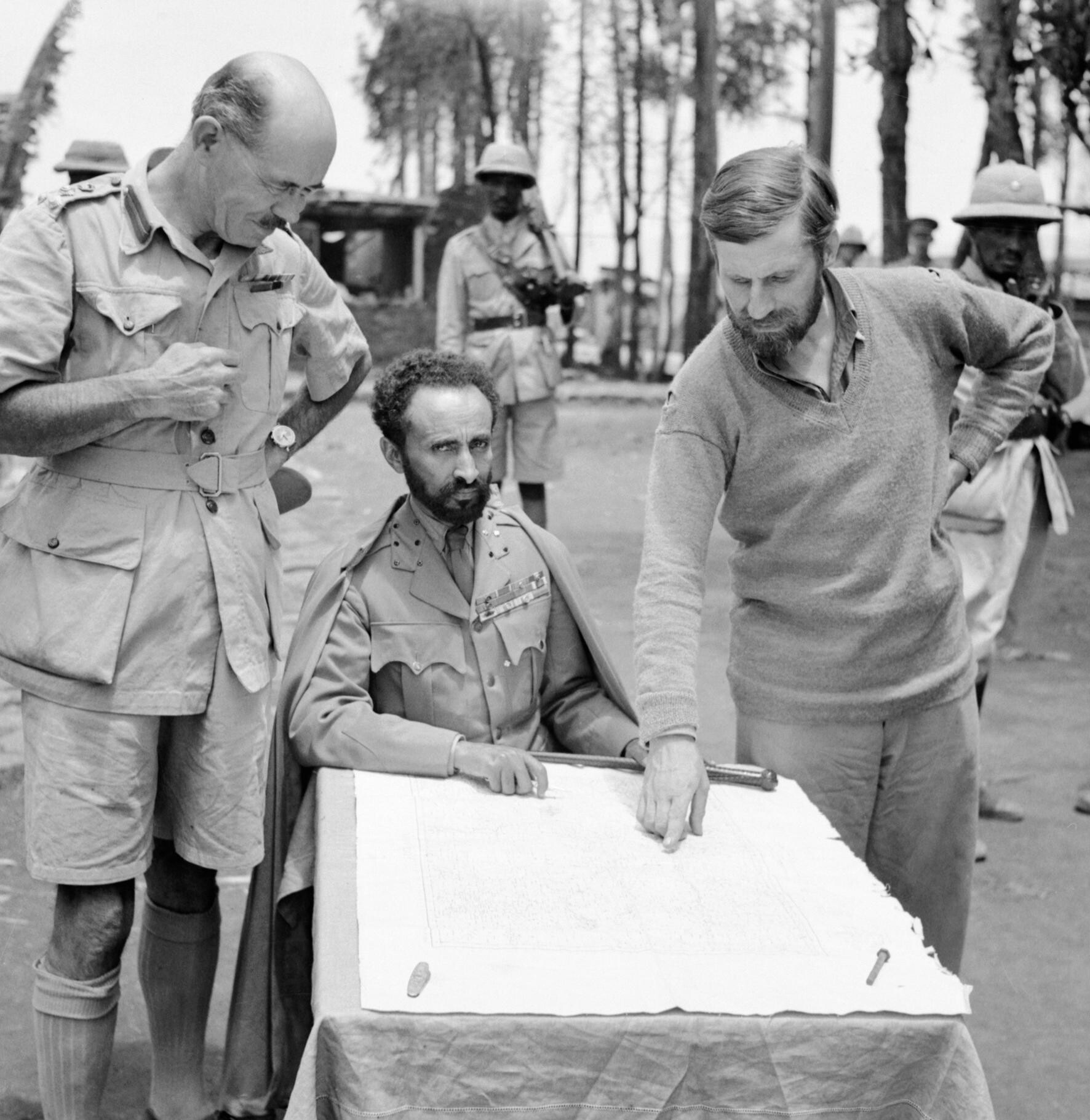
- Brigadier Sandford (left) with Haile Selassie, Emperor of Abyssinia, and Colonel Wingate in Dambacha Fort after it had been captured, 15 April 1941
- Born: 18 June 1882; Barnstaple, Devon, England
- Died: 22 January 1972 (aged 89); Mulo, Ethiopia
- Military career
- Allegiance: United Kingdom
- Branch: British Army
- Service years: 1900–1922; 1939–1942
- Rank: Brigadier
- Service number: 12438
- Commands: 355th Siege Battery; 94th Siege Battery, Royal Garrison Artillery
- Conflicts: First World War; Second World War
- Awards: Commander of the Order of the British Empire; Distinguished Service Order; Mentioned in dispatches Knight of the Legion of Honour (France); Haile Selassie I Military Medal (Ethiopia)

Brigadier Daniel Arthur Sandford, CBE, DSO (18 June 1882 – 22 January 1972) was a senior officer in the British Army during the Second World War, who served an advisor to Emperor Haile Selassie of Ethiopia.

== Early life ==
Sandford was born in Barnstaple, Devon, on 18 June 1882, the son of the Venerable Ernest Grey Sandford, Archdeacon of Exeter. His great-grandfather was Daniel Sandford and his brother was Lieutenant Richard Douglas Sandford, a recipient of the Victoria Cross.

Sandford was commissioned into the Royal Garrison Artillery (RGA) as a second lieutenant on 18 August 1900, and was promoted to lieutenant on 22 May 1902. He saw imperial service in both India and the Sudan. Significantly, he visited Ethiopia in 1907, and by 1914 was serving at the British Consulate in Addis Adaba.

== First World War ==
Sandford arrived on the Western Front in France as a captain in February 1915, and by May 1916 had been promoted to the rank of major and was Officer Commanding the 94th Siege Battery, Royal Garrison Artillery, leading it in action from the attack on the Gommecourt Salient on the First day on the Somme (1 July 1916) until he was posted to command the 355th Siege Battery in September 1918. During the 'Great Retreat' caused by the German spring offensive in March 1918, Sandford later wrote that the 94th Siege Battery "not only saved our guns from the forefront of our broken line, but, refusing to understand that 9.2's were not field guns, turned them again and again on the enemy along that never-to-be-forgotten road back to Amiens". Following the war, he resigned his commission and moved to Ethiopia in 1920, where he became an advisor to Ethiopian Emperor Haile Selassie.

== Role in the Ethiopian Revolt of the Second World War ==
Sandford fled Ethiopia in early 1936 once it became clear that the 1935 Italian invasion of Ethiopia would succeed. Once back in England, Sandford maintained contact with the exiled emperor, who was based in Bath.

In August 1939, the head of the Middle East Command in Cairo, General Sir Archibald Wavell, summoned Sandford for duty. Wavell made Sandford a colonel and put him in charge of the Ethiopian Section in Middle East intelligence. Sandford immediately began liaising with resistance groups in Ethiopia, and in January 1940 toured the French- and British-held territories bordering Ethiopia to solicit support for a planned Allied-backed Ethiopian revolt against the Italians. The British plan to foster and assist the Ethiopian revolt was called Mission 101.

Sandford's tour was relatively successful, and so upon his return to Cairo he selected the team he would use to implement Mission 101 and drew up two plans of action: Scheme A, which dealt with military preparations and the British role, and Scheme B, which focused on the propaganda methods to be used. As soon as Italy declared war on 10 June, Sandford and his team swung into action implementing his plan. Sandford oversaw Mission 101 until the arrival of Orde Wingate.

Later in the war and in its immediate aftermath, Sandford served again as advisor to Emperor Selassie, both in military and political roles.

== Post-war years and death ==
Sandford held various posts in the Ethiopian government, retiring as Director General of the Addis Ababa Municipality in 1951. Meanwhile, his wife, Christine, (née Lush, d. 1975) established the Sandford Community School in Addis Ababa. The school still exists and is considered to be one of the best International Schools in Ethiopia.

After his retirement, Sandford devoted all his energies to farming the plot of land leased to him by Haile Selassie at Mulo (sometimes spelled Mulu, but not to be confused with Mulu in Sitti Zone) near the town Derba, 60 km north of Addis Ababa, planting among others, coffee and plum trees, and building stables for cattle. Sandford died at the farm on 22 January 1972.

After Selassie was overthrown by the Derg regime in 1974, the farm was nationalized, and more stables were built to increase the number of cattle. Within a few years however, the farm had ceased to be operational. Today, the farm plot is leased by a Dutch horticulture farm. The summerhouse built by Sandford is being renovated to its original state. Some parts of the construction had to be replaced but efforts are being made to keep the original material in place. The walls still contain the original cedar wood.

== Bibliography ==
- Casbon, Eleanor (1993). The Incurable Optimists: Chris and Dan Sandford of Ethiopia. Cornwall: United Writers. p. 235. ISBN 978-1-85200-050-9.
- Shireff, David (2009) [First published 1995]. Bare Feet and Bandoliers: Wingate, Sandford, the Patriots and the Liberation of Ethiopia. Barnsley: Pen & Sword Military. p. 336. ISBN 978-1-84884-029-4.
- Profile
- Generals of World War II
- Maj Charles E. Berkeley Lowe, Siege Battery 94 During the World War 1914–1918, London: T. Werner Laurie, 1919/Uckfield, Naval & Military Press, 2004, ISBN 1-845740-88-2.
