= Sheriff of Wigtown =

The Sheriff of Wigtown was historically the office responsible for enforcing law and order in Wigtown, Scotland and bringing criminals to justice. Prior to 1748 most sheriffdoms were held on a hereditary basis. From that date, following the Jacobite uprising of 1745, the hereditary sheriffs were replaced by salaried sheriff-deputes, qualified advocates who were members of the Scottish Bar.

It became known as the Sheriff of Wigton & Kirkcudbright in 1860 and was dissolved and incorporated into the sheriffdom of Dumfries & Galloway in 1874.

The Stewartry of Kirkcudbright was created in 1369, when the area between the Rivers Nith and Cree was granted to Archibald the Grim. A steward was appointed by to administer the area which was known the "Stewartry".

== Sheriffs of Wigtown ==
- Robert FitzTrute (c.1200)
- Alexander Comyn (1263-1266)
- John Comyn, Master of Buchan (1288)
- Walter of Twynham (1296)
- Domhnall mac Cailein c.1298
- John Comyn, Earl of Buchan (1300)
- Thomas McCulloch (1305)
- William Douglas of Leawalt (1424)
- Andrew Agnew (1456)
- Thomas Boyd, Earl of Arran (1468)
- Andrew Agnew (1468)
- John Graham (1648)
- Andrew Agnew (?-1747)

Sheriffs-Depute

- Alexander Boswell, 1748–1750
- Andrew Pringle, 1750–1751 (Sheriff of Selkirk, 1751)
- Thomas Dundas, 1751–
- Alexander Spalding Gordon, –1794
- John Busby Maitland, 1794–1818
- James Walker, 1818–c.1840
- Adam Urquhart 1843–1860

== Stewards of Kirkcudbright ==
- Donald Maclellen of Gelston, 1456
- William Edmonstoune of Duntreath, 1462
- John Kennedy of Blairquhan, 1463
- Thomas Boyd, Earl of Arran, 1468
- Humphrey Colquhoun, 1468
- Patrick Hepburn, 1st Earl of Bothwell, 1489
- Robert Maxwell, 5th Lord Maxwell, 1526

== Sheriffs of Kirkcudbright ==
- Thomas Miller, Lord Glenlee, 1748–1755
- David Ross, 1756–1763
- Alexander Gordon, Lord Rockville, 1764–1784
- Sir Alexander Gordon, 1784–1830
- Alexander Wood of Woodcote, 1830–1841
- Erskine Douglas Sandford, 1841–1860

== Sheriffs of Wigton & Kirkcudbright (1860) ==
- Erskine Douglas Sandford, 1860–61
- David Hector, 1861-1874
- For sheriffs after 1874 see Sheriff of Dumfries and Galloway

== See also ==
- Historical development of Scottish sheriffdoms
