= Daniel Sandford (bishop of Edinburgh) =

Scottish bishop

The Right Reverend Daniel Sandford M.A., D.D.
- Bishop of Edinburgh
- Church: Scottish Episcopal Church
- Diocese: Edinburgh
- In office: 1806–1830
- Predecessor: William Abernethy Drummond
- Successor: James Walker

Orders
- Ordination: 1790 (Deacon); 1791 (Priest)
- Consecration: 9 February 1809 by Bishops Skinner, Watson, and Jolly

Personal details
- Born: 1766 Delville, near Dublin, Ireland
- Died: 14 January 1830 (aged c. 63-64) Edinburgh, Scotland
- Denomination: Anglican
- Parents: Reverend Daniel Sandford and Sarah Chapone
- Spouse: Helen Frances Catherine Douglas
- Children: seven children

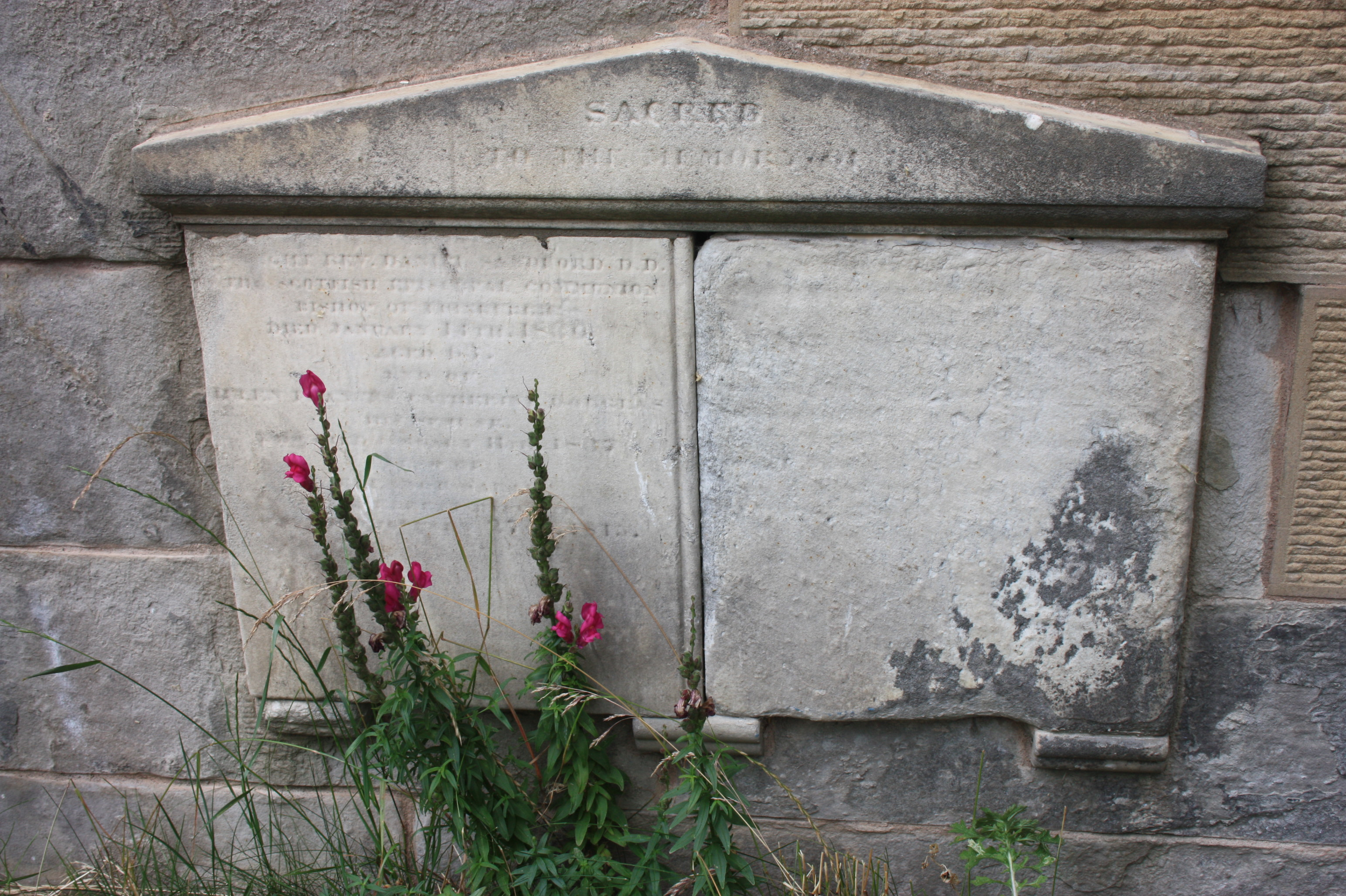
The grave of Rev Daniel Sandford, St John's Episcopal Church, Edinburgh

Daniel Sandford, M.A., D.D. (1766 – 14 January 1830) was an Irish-born Anglican clergyman who served in the Scottish Episcopal Church as the Bishop of Edinburgh from 1806 until 1830.

== Life ==
Sandford was born in 1766 at Delville House, Glasnevin, near Dublin, Ireland, the son of Reverend Daniel Sandford and Sarah Chapone. He was a great grandson of Francis Sandford. His mother Sarah was the goddaughter of Mary Delany and left Daniel a legacy in her will.

In 1792, he became minister of a Qualified Episcopal congregation in Edinburgh, for whom the Charlotte Chapel, Edinburgh was built in 1797. This congregation eventually became St John's Episcopal Church, a congregation of the Diocese of Edinburgh. At this period he was living at the newly built house at 22 South Frederick Street in Edinburgh's New Town.

He graduated from Oxford University in 1802 with a Doctor of Divinity (D.D). Together with his congregation, he joined the Episcopal Church of Scotland in 1803, and was ordained bishop of Edinburgh in 1806. He remained Rector of St John's and Bishop of Edinburgh congruently until his death.

Sandford died at home, 17 Melville Street on 14 January 1830 at Edinburgh. He is buried in the churchyard of St John's on Princes Street. The grave lies on the first terrace off Princes Street, east of the church. The marble tablet is heavily eroded.

== Family ==
Sandford married Helen Frances Catherine Douglas, on 11 October 1790. They had seven children, including:

- Erskine Douglas Sandford,(1793–1861), Advocate and Sheriff of Wigtown, who married, on 2 April 1829, Joanna Grace, daughter of William Graham of Mossknow, Dumfriesshire, and left children.
- Frances Catherine Sandford, married Revd Charles Lane
- Sir Daniel Sandford, a politician and scholar, married and had children including:
  - Francis Sandford, 1st Baron Sandford
  - Daniel Sandford, Bishop of Tasmania
- Ven John Sandford (Archdeacon of Coventry), married and had children including:
  - John Sandford, cricketer and judicial official in British India
  - Charles Sandford, Bishop of Gibraltar
  - Venerable Ernest Grey Sandford, Archdeacon of Exeter, married and had children including:
    - Daniel Sandford
    - Richard Sandford

Anglican Communion titles
Preceded by William Abernethy Drummond	Bishop of Edinburgh; 1806 –1830	Succeeded by James Walker
