= 94th Siege Battery, Royal Garrison Artillery =

94th Siege Battery, RGA
- Cap Badge of the Royal Regiment of Artillery
- Active: 16 December 1915 – 24 June 1919
- Country: United Kingdom
- Branch: British Army
- Role: Siege artillery
- Part of: Royal Garrison Artillery
- Garrison/HQ: Tynemouth
- Engagements: Battle of the Somme; Battle of Arras; Battle of Messines; Flanders Coast; German spring offensive Battle of Amiens; Battle of the St Quentin Canal; Battle of Épehy; Battle of the Sambre

Commanders
- Notable commanders: Major Daniel Sandford

94th Siege Battery, was a heavy howitzer unit of the Royal Garrison Artillery (RGA) formed in North East England during World War I. It saw active service on the Western Front at the Somme, Arras, and Messines, on the Flanders coast, against the German spring offensive, and in the final Hundred Days Offensive.

== Mobilisation ==
On the outbreak of war in 1914 the part-time Territorial Force (TF) was mobilised at its war stations, including the Durham Royal Garrison Artillery, a 'defended ports' unit at Hartlepool. Shortly afterwards TF units were invited to volunteer for Overseas Service and on 15 August 1914, the War Office (WO) issued instructions to separate those men who had signed up for Home Service only, and form these into reserve units. On 31 August, the formation of a reserve or 2nd Line unit was authorised for each 1st Line unit where 60 per cent or more of the men had volunteered for Overseas Service. In this way duplicate companies and batteries were created, releasing the 1st Line units to be sent overseas.

By the autumn of 1914, the campaign on the Western Front was bogging down into Trench warfare and the British Expeditionary Force (BEF) had an urgent need for batteries of siege artillery. The WO decided that the TF coastal gunners were well enough trained to take over many of the duties in the coastal defences, releasing Regular RGA gunners for service in the field, and 1st line TF RGA companies that had volunteered for overseas service had been authorised to increase their strength by 50 per cent.

During 1915 the WO began to form new RGA siege batteries based on cadres from TF coast defence units. 94th Siege Battery (unofficially known as 94th (Durham) Siege Battery) was formed at Tynemouth under WO Instruction 181 of 16 December 1915, with three officers and 78 other ranks (ORs) (the establishment of a TF company of the RGA) from the Durham RGA; the other 40 per cent of the personnel were regulars and New Army volunteers drawn from the Tynemouth Garrison. The battery was commanded by Captain Daniel Sandford, DSO, who was promoted to major.

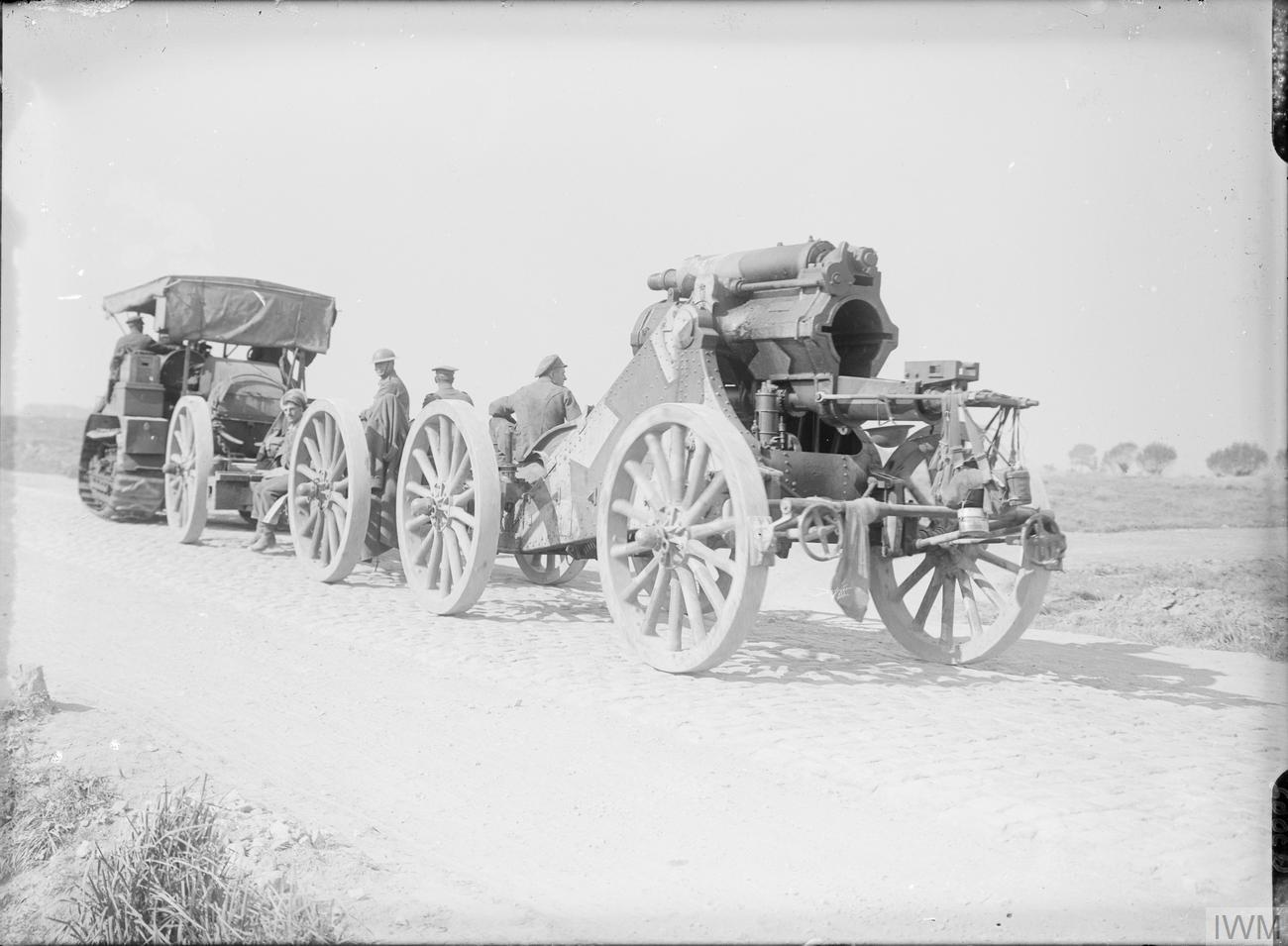
9.2-inch howitzer broken down into three loads for road movement, towed by a Holt tractor.

After basic training at Tynemouth, where Sandford laid special emphasis on signalling, the battery moved to Cooden Camp at Bexhill-on-Sea on 4 February 1916, where the gunners practised laying gun platforms and manhandling guns at night across country and over ditches. Then followed seven weeks from 8 March at Lydd Camp, where the battery practised shooting with 6-inch howitzers and was introduced to the BL 9.2-inch howitzer Mark I that it was to operate. Towards the end of April it went to Stockcross near Newbury, Berkshire, where it collected its four 9.2-inch howitzers and was joined by its ammunition column of the Army Service Corps (ASC), comprising four Holt 75 caterpillar tractors, 32 three-ton lorries and one Daimler car.

== Service ==
=== Gommecourt ===
The battery embarked at Folkestone and landed at Boulogne on 30 May. The following day the men began unloading their howitzers, tractors and lorries, which had arrived from Avonmouth Docks aboard the SS Hunsgate. On 5 June the battery moved out, the howitzers and tractors by rail, the personnel by lorry, to join Third Army on the Somme front. It began deploying 100 yards (91 m) north of Bayencourt Church on 7 June. After digging gun positions and assembling its howitzers, the guns were mounted on the night of 9/10 June and the battery began registering targets in preparation for the Attack on the Gommecourt Salient on the First day on the Somme. No 1 Sub-Section fired the battery's first round on 15 June.

The battery formed part of 35th Heavy Artillery Group (HAG), (Note: RGA brigades had recently been redesignated Heavy Artillery Groups, and did not have a fixed organisation, batteries being attached as required.) in VII Corps, being grouped with 93rd and 95th Siege Btys to make up No 2 Sub-group of 12 x 9.2-inch howitzers. The sub-group's main role was to use the high-angle fire of its howitzers to bombard German trenches and strongpoints facing 56th (1/1st London) Division's attack frontage on the south side of the Gommecourt salient. The specific targets assigned to 94th Siege Bty were the strongpoints at 'The Maze', the communication trenches codenamed Exe, Ems, and Epte, and the line of trenches codenamed Mess, Mere, Meed and Meet running along the top of the ridge into Rossignol Wood.

The bombardment programme was planned to spread over five days, U, V, W, X and Y, before the assault was launched on Z day. 94th Siege Bty opened fire on V day (25 June) with an allowance of 50 shells per gun per day (70 for Y day), but in practice it fell short of this allowance on all but one day of the bombardment. Because of poor weather on Y day, the attack was postponed for two days, and the additional days (Y1 and Y2) were used for further bombardment, but the battery failed to fire on Y1 and fired only 59 rounds on Y2. Overall, the damage caused to the German positions was insufficient to suppress the defenders.

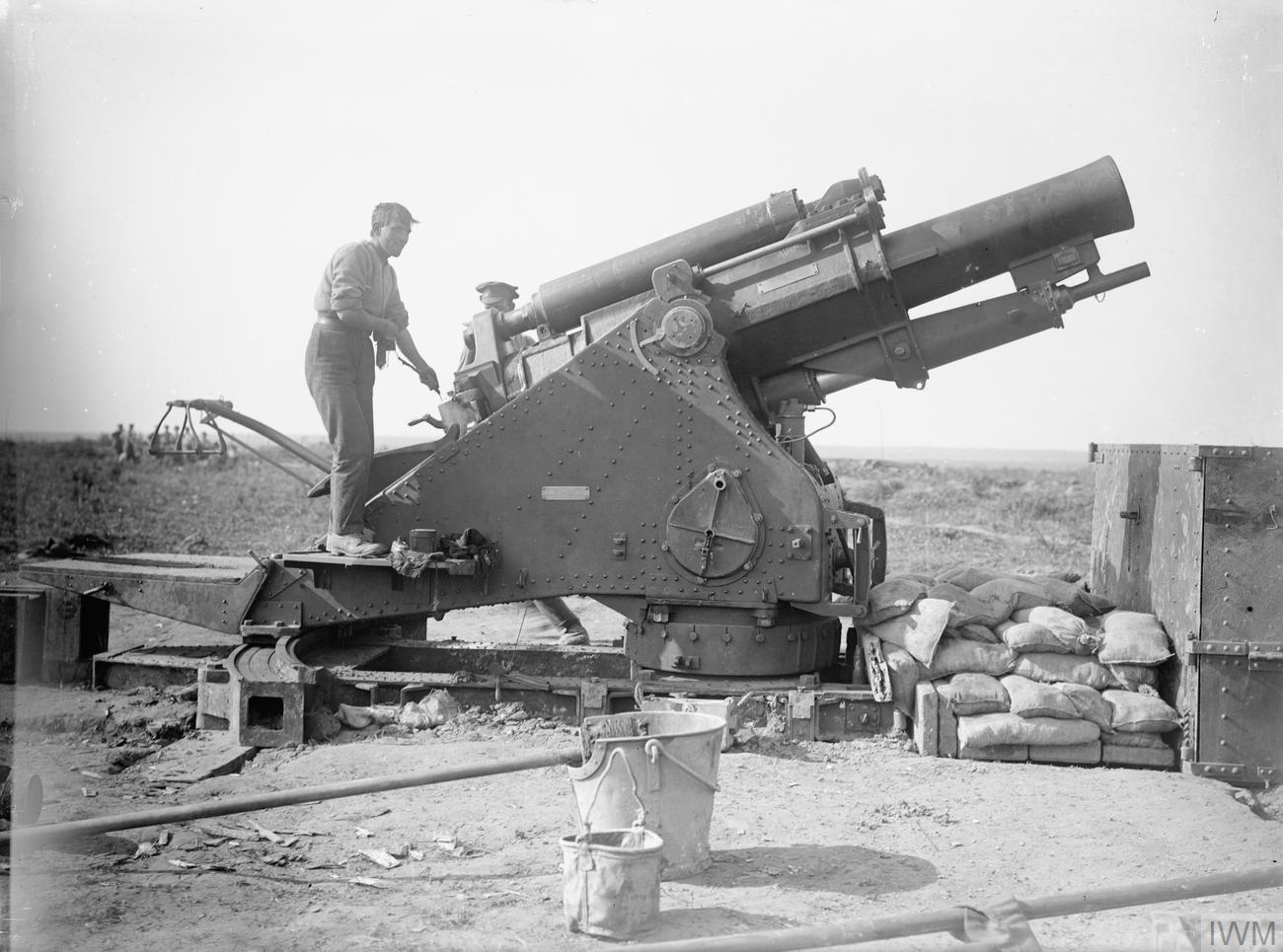
9.2-inch howitzer in action on the Somme, 1916.

On Z Day (1 July), the entire artillery supporting 56th Division fired a 65-minute bombardment of the German front, starting at 06.25. 94th Siege Bty succeeded in firing 100 rounds per gun in that time, a remarkable feat that caused significant damage to the howitzers' buffers and recuperators due to overheating. At 07.30 the guns lifted onto their pre-arranged targets in the German support and reserve lines as the infantry got out of their forward trenches and advanced towards Gommecourt.

At first all went well for 56th Division. Despite casualties from the German counter-bombardment on their jumping-off trenches, the smoke and morning mist helped the infantry, and they reached the German front line with little loss and moved on towards the second and reserve lines. The Forward Observation Officers (FOOs) in their observation posts (OPs) reported the signboards erected by the leading waves to mark their progress. However, the OPs themselves came under fire from the German guns, which laid a Barrage across No man's land preventing supplies and reinforcements from reaching the leading infantry waves who had entered the German trenches. The OPs' telephone lines were continually cut by shellfire. By midday, the Germans were launching concerted counter-attacks from all directions, including Epte, Ems and Etch trenches, and by mid-afternoon 56th Division's slight gains were being eroded. 94th Siege Bty's OP party were able to turn the guns onto some of these counter-attacks, but all the remaining gains had to be abandoned after dark.

VII Corps' costly attack was only a diversion from the main BEF attack further south, and was not renewed after the first day. A truce was observed at Gommecourt on 2 July to allow both sides to collect their wounded. 94th Siege Bty remained in position at Bayencourt, but was transferred to the command of 46th HAG on 4 July. The battery did not fire again for a month, overhauling its guns and digging new gun positions at Hébuterne to support a proposed attack at Serre. However, after three weeks' work on these positions, the battery was ordered on 14 August to hand the guns and emplacements over to 143rd Siege Bty and take over that battery's equipment at Doullens. The exchange was made on 23 August, and 94th Siege Bty was then ordered to move by road to Albert, where it came under 45th HAG in I ANZAC Corps of Reserve Army (later renamed Fifth Army).

=== Somme ===
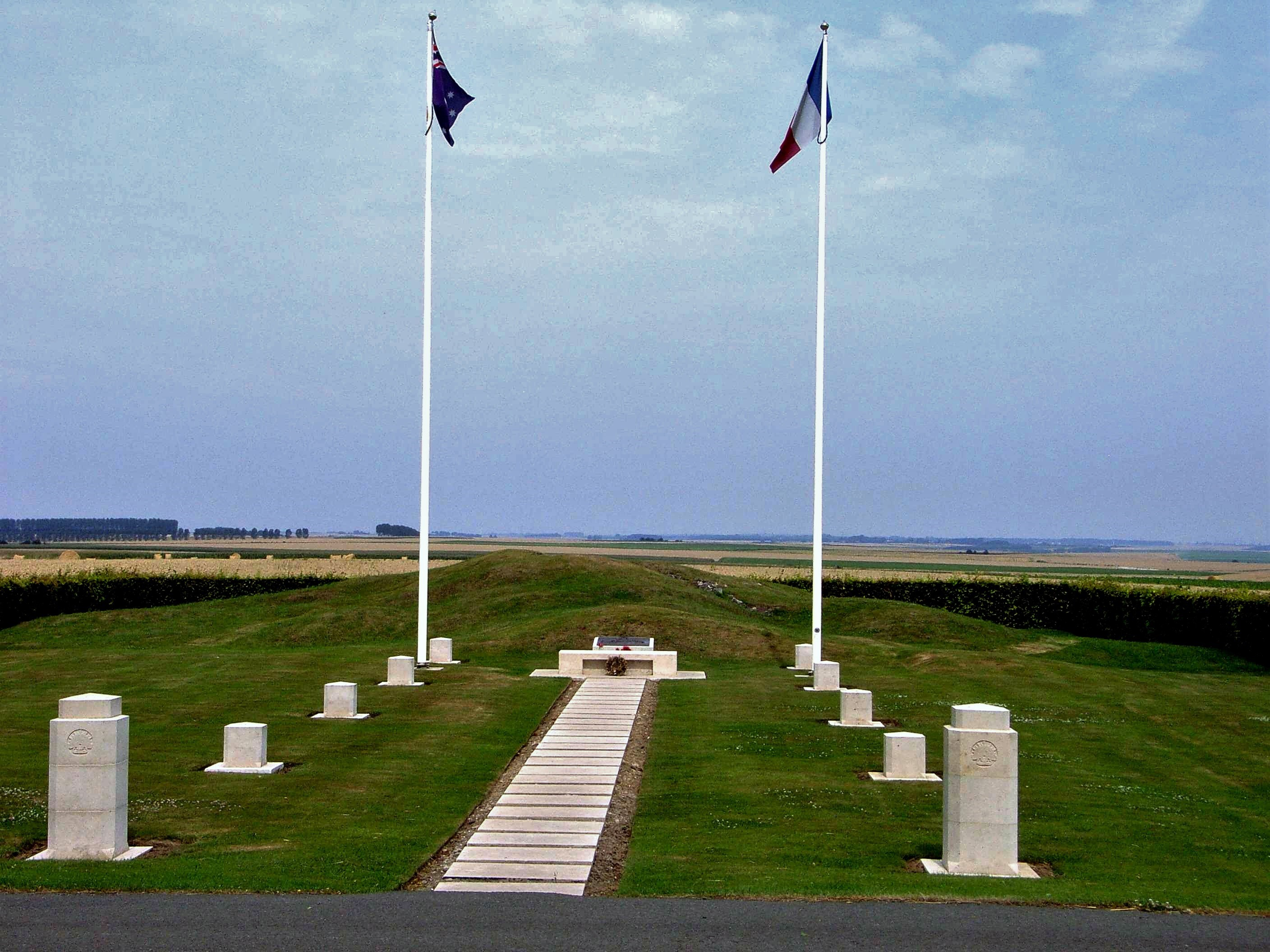
The ANZAC memorial at Pozières windmill, where 94th Siege Bty established an observation post.

45th HAG had been supporting the Anzacs in their attacks at Pozières, but the BEF was preparing for a new phase of the Somme offensive (the Battle of Flers-Courcelette). 94th Siege Bty was ordered to go 'into action' at once. It spent two days preparing a position on the western edge of Contalmaison, which had just been captured, but this was unsuitable, so the two guns of Right Section (RX) were mounted on 25 August behind the ruins of La Boisselle Church. On 3 September, Left Section (LX) moved into an exposed advanced position in 'Spring Gardens', a sunken road connecting Ovillers with the main Albert–Pozières road. It was while preparing these positions that the battery suffered its first casualties killed in action by shellfire.

On 10 September the ruins of Pozières windmill were finally captured. This small operation was accompanied by its own heavy bombardment, carried out by other batteries without prior registration. The 9.2-inch shells fell 100 yards (91 m) short, around 94th Siege Bty's OP in the British front trenches. Luckily, the battery signallers had a telephone line through to 45th HAG HQ, and the fire was redirected. The signallers then had to establish their OP in the ruins of the windmill, which gave clear observation down to Courcelette, but was under enemy fire. Having spent some days in registration, 94th Siege Bty joined in the methodical bombardment on 12 September. The whole German defence system between Morval and Le Sars was shelled, with LX of 94th Siege Bty, only 2,300 yards (2,100 m) behind the front line, concentrating on counter-battery (CB) fire, despite being under fire itself from gas shells. Directed by air observers, the CB fire in this battle was notably effective. At Zero hour (06.20) on 15 September, the guns began intense fire to support the infantry and (for the first time) tanks as they began their advance. Although there were some successes, the attack fell short of expectations, and fighting continued for several days. Bad weather hindered air observation and the roads began to collapse into mud.

A new attack was made on 26 September (the Battle of Thiepval Ridge). 94th Siege Bty bombarded the Hessian, Regina and Kenora trench systems, and the villages of Pys, Irles and Miraumont in support of II Corps and Canadian Corps. Once again, LX in its advanced position carried out CB shoots, though the weather prevented air observation. The battery's FOO party, observing from a trench with the attacking battalions, was buried by a German 5.9-inch shell and had to be dug out, the signallers being evacuated with Shell shock.

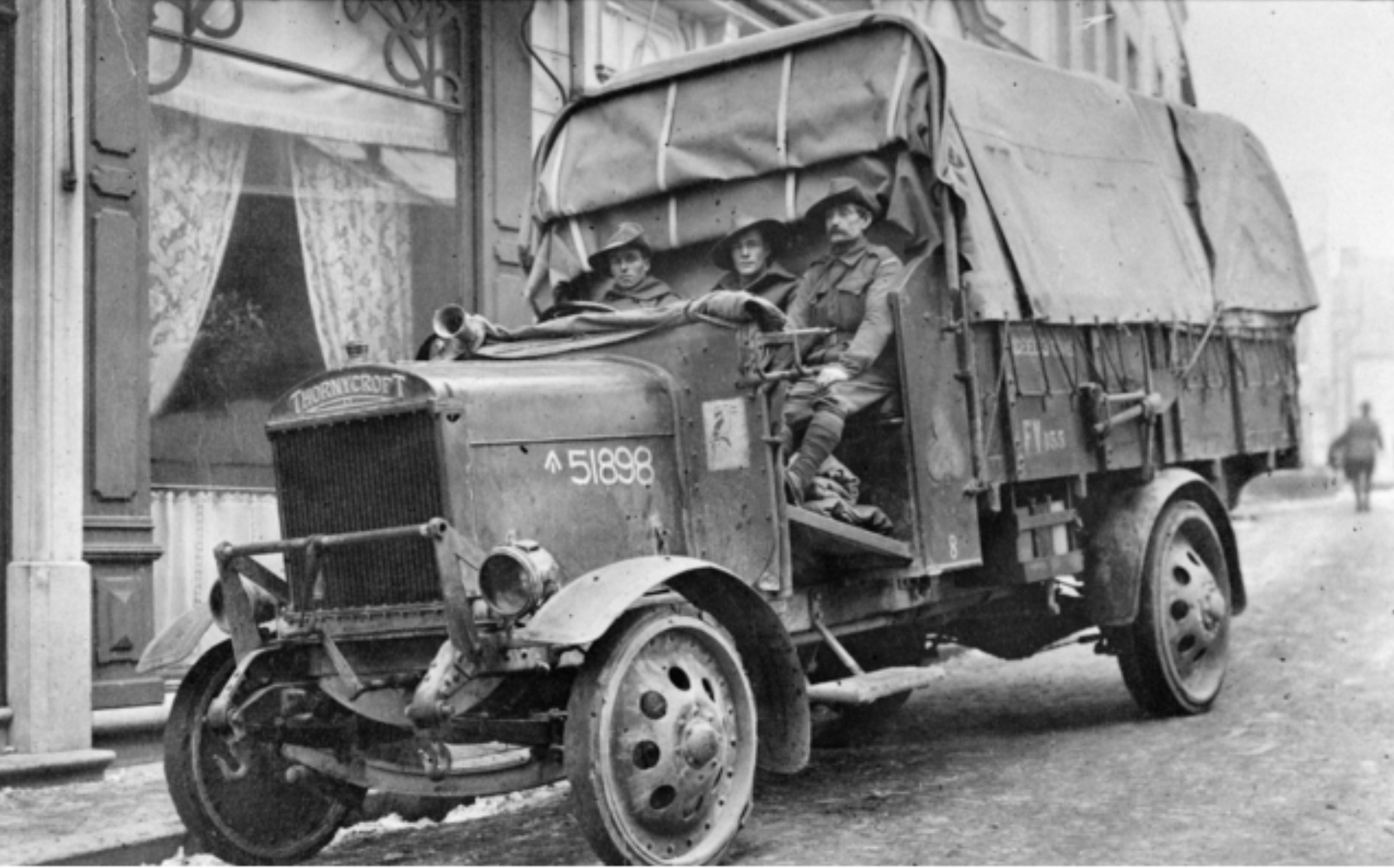
A Thornycroft J Type lorry (this one operated by Australian troops) of the type used to move 9.2-inch ammunition.

=== Winter 1916–17 ===
Apart from a minor operation to capture Regina Trench in October, active operations on this front were closed down for the winter except harassing fire. Between 13 and 16 November, Battery HQ and RX moved up to join LX at 'Spring Gardens' and the battery constructed deep dugouts and Nissen huts. Minor operations on the Ancre began in January 1917. On 3 February 94th Siege Bty transferred to 10th HAG and moved up to Thiepval village between 4 and 9 February, having to blast gun pits in the frozen ground with explosives and then move the guns through mud as the thaw set in. 10th HAG was assigned to CB fire for II Corps' attack on Miraumont on 17 February.

Shortly after the action at Miraumont the Germans began their planned withdrawal to the Hindenburg Line (Operation Alberich). Following up was especially difficult for the heavy artillery, with all the roads forwards having been destroyed. Sandford got permission to drag his guns cross-country. Between 25 February and 3 March the two guns of RX were hauled by five tractors across 2 miles (3.2 km) of open country, covered with shellholes full of water and intersected by numerous trenches, to reach a position near Grandcourt. Meanwhile LX built a light railway to bring ammunition to this site. Once RX arrived, it fired in support of the operations to take Irles and the Loupart Line, including a highly effective CB shoot with air observation on a hostile battery near Achiet-le-Grand. Left Section dismounted its guns and prepared new positions near Miraumont, but these were not occupied because the Germans retreated out of range.

Moving heavy guns across the devastated country in pursuit of the Germans was too difficult, so 94th Siege Bty was ordered to 'stand easy' and was out of action from 18 to 29 March, during which period it came under 40th HAG on 20 March, then moved to 25th HAG with V Corps on 26 March. However the CO and several battery officers went forward acting as artillery liaison officers with the infantry and as reconnaissance officers for II Corps, while the battery signallers laid 13 miles (21 km) of cable and provided the only heavy artillery communications with the front. Captain F. Grant (from North Scottish RGA, who had recently joined the battery) accompanied the advanced infantry patrols as they entered Achiet-le-Grand, and when they were held up at the exit of the village he took a Lewis gun up into the church ruins and drove off the enemy, for which he was awarded a Military Cross (MC).

=== Bullecourt ===
94th Siege Bty came back into action on 6 April, on the north-western outskirts of Vaulx-Vraucourt losing two lorries hit by shellfire and burnt out during the move in. The battery then began a steady bombardment of the Hindenburg Line for an attack on 11 April by V Corps and I Anzac Corps (the First attack on Bullecourt). Opening fire again at Zero (05.00) on 11 April the battery fired continuously for 24 hours, expending about 1200 rounds, with none of the guns out of action for more than 2 hours. However, the attack was a costly failure. The rest of the month and first half of May were spent by 94th Siege Bty in CB work while several further attempts were made to take Bullecourt and breach the Hindenburg Line. The heavy howitzers were occasionally used for 'sniping' enemy wagons and movements seen from the OP in the cemetery near Écoust-Saint-Mein.

=== Messines ===
The battery was pulled out of its positions on 19 May and withdrawn to Albert where it entrained for Second Army, in the Ypres sector. It was posted to 52nd HAG with II ANZAC Corps on 24 May. Next day it was 'in action' in prepared positions at Dou-Dou Farm near Ploegsteert ('Plug Street'). This was part of a huge artillery build-up for the forthcoming Battle of Messines, with 500 rounds supplied for each howitzer. The CB duel with the Germans guns was intense, with 94th Siege Bty amongst others receiving gas shelling almost every night, while nearby batteries had their ammunition dumps blown up, 'with awesome detonations that made one's blood run cold'. 94th Siege Bty's assigned targets were the trenches codenamed Ulna Switch and Ulrica Support, and once the assault went in on 7 June, following the explosion of huge mines, it supported the advance of the New Zealand Division, establishing an OP on Messines Ridge. The results of the limited attack were spectacular.

The British artillery was repositioned after the battle, 94th Siege Bty moving into Le Bizet, a suburb of Armentières, with the guns mounted on the banks of the River Lys by 10 June. The battery's camouflage was effective, the Germans persistently shelling an unoccupied position 200 yards (180 m) away, though some casualties were suffered from stray shells. The battery was withdrawn on 18 June for rest while the guns were overhauled in the workshops.

=== Flanders Coast ===
The BEF's next operation was the Flanders Offensive, aiming to break through at Ypres, with a follow-up attack along the coast supported by amphibious landings (Operation Hush). In preparation, Fourth Army was assembled on the coast at Nieuport. As part of this concentration 94th Siege Bty was sent to join XV Corps, first coming under 49th HAG on 26 June, changing to 1st HAG four days later. Three of the battery's guns were in action north-east of Oostduinkerke by 4 July, despite difficulties emplacing them in the sand dunes. Sandford was attached to the corps CB staff, so Grant took temporary command of the battery. British preparations were disrupted by a German spoiling attack on 10 July. 94th Siege Bty came under heavy neutralising fire, suffering a number of casualties, including 2/Lt De Beer and two gunners killed, but fired 586 HE shells on map references in response to SOS calls from the infantry. During the night the battery's ammunition dump was set on fire but was extinguished by a party of volunteers, several of whom were later decorated for gallantry. Next day the battery fired shorter SOS tasks, on Raven Trench and Deuce Trench, and suffered another seven wounded. On 12 July, while Nos 2 and 4 guns were firing on a target with air observation, the battery came under heavy and accurate CB fire. They continued for one and a half hours until No 4 gun was hit in the breech and four gunners wounded. A second aircraft going up to replace the first (damaged by anti-aircraft fire), No 2 gun renewed the shoot until it was also hit and put out of action. No 4 gun being repaired, a third aircraft was sent over to complete the shoot. The ammunition of both guns was also set on fire during the day. While at Nieuport the battery's 'casualties were never higher, and our shooting never better'. (Note: After the war, 2/Lt De Beer and the two gunners who died on 10 July were reburied in Ramscappelle Road Military Cemetery. A further 10 dead from the battery from 1917 are buried nearby in Coxyde Military Cemetery)

After 12 July, with one gun still damaged, the battery was pulled out of its exposed position and moved 600 yards (550 m) back; it also transferred to 36th HAG. The next six weeks saw continuous artillery exchanges and moves to fresh positions. During this period the 4-gun battery suffered the equivalent of 14 guns put out of action; at one point in early September it only had one serviceable gun. There was also a steady trickle of killed and wounded, including Capt Grant seriously wounded. Fourth Army having lost its bridgehead over the River Yser to the German spoiling attack, and the BEF having failed to break through at Ypres, Operation Hush was called off. 94th Siege Bty's personnel were finally sent to a rest camp on 24 September.

Sandford returned to the battery at the beginning of October, when reinforcements were received and the battery transferred to the command of 45th HAG when 36th HAG was withdrawn. The battery took up position near Oostduinkerke once more, under harassing fire from the enemy, until late November when it handed over to a French battery. 94th Siege Bty was then withdrawn to Womhoudt in the Ypres sector for rest and refit, having lost about 110 casualties during its five months at Nieuport.

=== Ypres ===
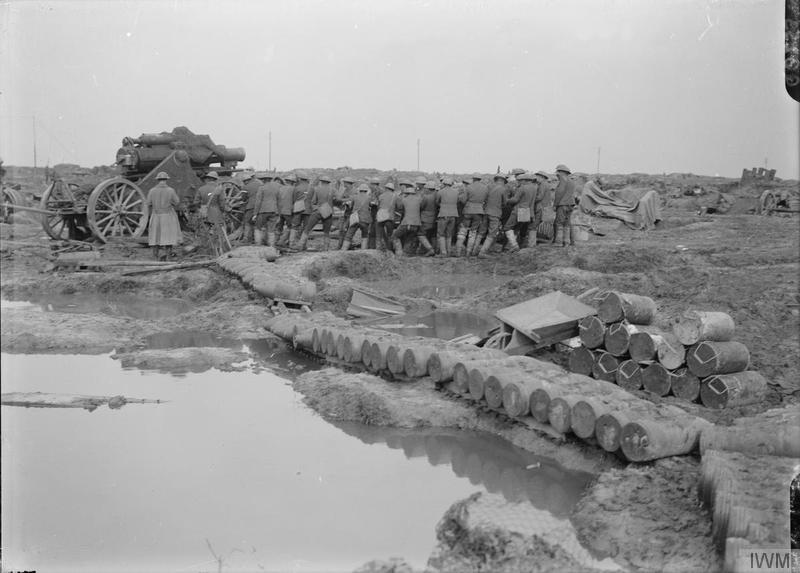
Positioning a 9.2-inch howitzer and its ammunition in the mud of the Ypres Salient, 1917.

At Wormhoudt the battery came under the command of 19th HAG and underwent training for the large number of reinforcements that had been posted. On 6 December 94th Siege Bty was ordered to 23rd HAG, and joined it on 11 December. By now HAG allocations had become more fixed, and from February 1918 they were converted into permanent RGA brigades. 23rd Brigade was designated as a 9.2-inch Howitzer Brigade, with 94th Siege Bty as its centrepiece, accompanied by three batteries of 6-inch howitzers. 94th Siege Bty remained with this brigade until the Armistice. The battery was also increased to six guns when a section joined on 15 January 1918 from 190th Siege Bty, an experienced unit that had been on the Western Front since November 1916. The newcomers became Left Section (LX) while the existing Left Section became Centre Section (CX).

From 6 January the battery was preparing fresh positions about 100 yards (91 m) from the Yser Canal locks near Boesinghe. This involved constructing gun platforms in the chaos of the old German front line and laying a light railway to bring ammunition up over the shellholes. The battery was officially back in action on 22 January, but shortly afterwards 23rd Brigade moved south to join Fifth Army, with 94th Siege Bty entraining at Poperinghe on 9 February.

=== Spring Offensive ===
23rd Brigade initially came under Cavalry Corps, then XIX Corps when that moved in to reinforce Fifth Army. 94th Siege Bty prepared positions on the southern outskirts of Roisel, with LX and RX deeply dug into a bank on the Roisel–Bernes road and CX in camouflaged positions on the Roisel–Hancourt road. These positions were defensive: the guns could only reach the German front line. The policy was then changed and the guns moved further forwards to disrupt the obvious German offensive preparations. About 29 February, LX moved to Cologne Valley, followed by RX to Bois Haut north of Hesbécourt, then CX into a nearby quarry: CX began dismount their guns at 16.00 on 13 March and by 11.00 next day had already fried 100 shells at bridge over the St Quentin Canal. Counter-preparation shoots against likely enemy assembly positions were carried out each night. Meanwhile the battery selected reserve positions to fall back to if the Germans broke through.

The expected German offensive (Operation Michael) opened at 04.30 on 21 March, when 94th Siege Bty came under gas and high explosive (HE) shelling. Morning mist assisted the attackers and visual signalling was impossible, while telephone lines were cut by shellfire. However, in the absence of orders 94th Siege Bty began firing on its pre-arranged targets. The Germans quickly overran XIX Corps' forward battalions, and when the mist cleared about 11.30 could be seen streaming forward. At 12.30 orders arrived from 23rd Brigade for the battery to prepare to pull out, followed by the order to withdraw at 14.00. The ASC brought up four lorries and one Holt tractor per gun, and the gunners began dismantling the guns. LX and RX were on the road towards their reserve positions at Roisel by 19.00, under direct fire from machine guns and a German field gun; CX followed two hours later. The battery had only lost a few firing beams and a baseplate, but that night the drivers tried to pull out some neighbouring 6-inch howitzers and lost a tractor.

By the end of 21 March, 94th Siege Bty was concentrated at Roisel, with the intention of covering XIX Corps' Brown Line. But this trench system was only half dug, and the Germans had broken through it by 08.00 on 22 March and were only a few hundred yards from Roisel. The battery was ordered to move on to Cartigny (having to abandon another tractor and baseplate), and then on to Mons-en-Chaussée, where the gunners began preparing positions. However, at 22.00, orders came from 23rd Bde that all the heavy artillery had to be across the Somme by dawn on 23 March. The guns were hauled across the bridge at Brie before it was blown. Before the gunners could prepare positions they were ordered further back to Estrées-Deniécourt, from where the guns could cover the bridges from a safer distance. While turning the column round in a roadside field, the battery was machine-gunned by German aircraft without result. The battery then re-entered the stream of retreating vehicles. One of the tractors broke down while negotiating a crowded crossroads, and the driver won a Military Medal (MM) for repairing it under fire. The battery reached Estrées at 18.00 and had one gun mounted by midnight. Elsewhere in XIX Corps, a number of the heavy guns were overrun and captured.

Next morning the Germans forced a crossing of the Somme, and the battery was ordered to move again. The night of 24 March saw the gunners digging positions, but were then ordered to move on to Wiencourt; on the way they picked up a new 9.2-inch howitzer from the workshop, giving the battery seven instead of six guns. On 26 March 94th Siege Bty was sent to Villers-Bretonneux to give fire support. By now it seemed that the German breakthrough had been halted, and the battery was actually ordered to advance to Bayonvillers, where it mounted three guns, but the retreat continued and it went back to Villers-Bretonneux. Although three guns began firing, there were now only stragglers and scratch forces in front to slow the Germans, and exhausted 94th moved back to Boves, nearer to Amiens. Yet the scratch force (Carey's Force) held the German advance at Villers-Bretonneux, and on 29 March the battery returned to set up two guns and an OP. On 4 April the battery supported the Australians in the First Battle of Villers-Bretonneux. Even though the two guns later had to fall back, the OPs reported the Germans being 'mown down' by British artillery fire. The battle ended Operation Michael. Two guns of 94th Siege Bty had been established at Petit Blangy, outside Amiens, and they kept up heavy fire until 14 April, when the section and stores were handed over to 265th Siege Bty and 94th was sent to the Abbeville area for rest. During the 'Great Retreat' the battery had moved 85 miles (137 km) by road, prepared 13 positions, firing from nine of them, and had fired over 1500 rounds. Casualties had been light. The battery commander later proudly wrote that the battery 'not only saved our guns from the forefront of our broken line, but, refusing to understand that 9.2's were not field guns, turned them again and again on the enemy along that never-to-be-forgotten road back to Amiens'.

=== Summer 1918 ===
Having completed their refits, the batteries of 23rd Bde were ordered back into the line on 1 May. They were now under Australian Corps of Third Army on the Somme. Left Section of 94th Siege Bty was emplaced on the western edge of Bresle Wood by 3 May, RX on the NE outskirts of Franvillers by 7 May, and CX at the chalk pit 1,000 yards (910 m) N of Ribemont-sur-Ancre by 9 May. May, June and July were spent in vigorous harassing and CB fire on German positions, aided by survey parties to aid calibration and observation by aircraft and balloons. On 19 May the battery supported an attack by 2nd Australian Division on Ville-sur-Ancre by neutralising enemy batteries, and supported a more ambitious surprise attack by Australian Corps on Hamel on 4 July. The battery suffered a number of casualties at Bresle Wood from German night bombers. To increase its effective range, RX was moved up to join CX at Ribemont on 12 July, but shortly afterwards 23rd Bde passed to III Corps' Heavy Artillery with Fourth Army, involving a change of positions. The two sections at Ribemont moved into positions on the outskirts of Hénencourt and Baizieux on 20 July, and later the Bresle Wood position was abandoned and the guns moved to a valley 1,500 yards (1,400 m) NE of Franvillers. The gunsite at Baizieux was a 'silent' one, not to open fire until required, so the crews were rotated around the other sites.

=== Amiens ===
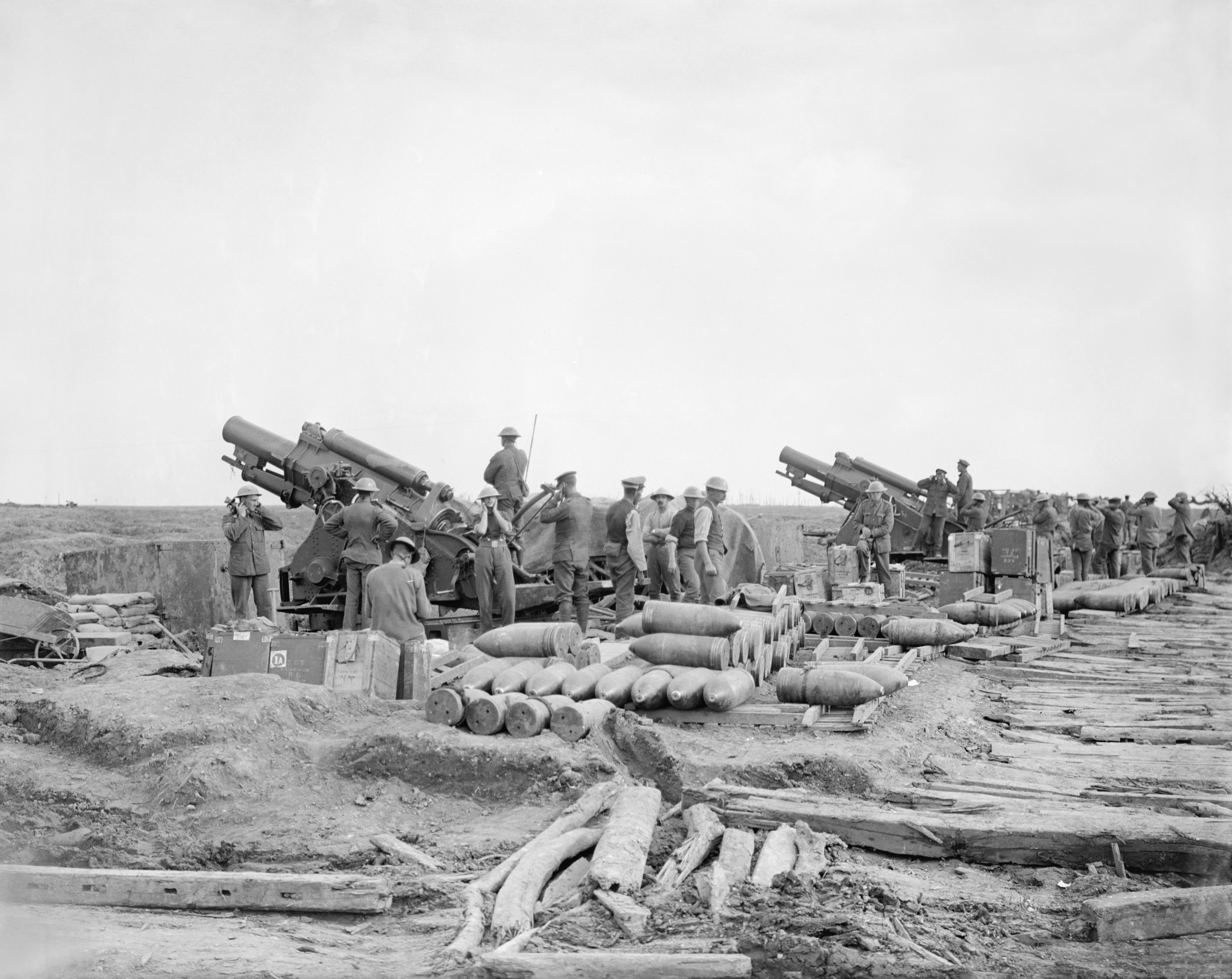
Section of 9.2-inch howitzers in action.

The Allies launched their counter-offensive at the Battle of Amiens on 8 August 1918. III Corps' role was subsidiary, to form a flank guard to Fourth Army's main attack. Its guns were pushed well forward before the attack, with LX and CX of 94th Siege Bty in an advanced position in the village of Ribemont and RX about 2,000 yards (1,800 m) N of Buire-sur-l'Ancre. In order to exploit any advances, mobile sub-groups of 6-inch howitzers and 60-pounder guns were formed, with Maj Sandford commanding one group; the battery captain fell sick, so Lieutenant R.A.E Somerville was promoted to command 94th Bty during the battle. The attack was a resounding success, the CB fire being most effective on III Corps' front, and although that Corps had some harder fighting than others, the guns were moved up at once. In 94th Siege Bty, CX and LX were moved up from Ribemont on 11 August and concealed in the ruins of Ville-sur-Ancre. After 10 days' heavy firing, CX was sent further forward to Dernancourt on 23 August and next day RX advanced to Méaulte, but did not fire a shot because the Germans had retreated out of range before the guns were mounted.

The battery was concentrated at Méaulte to overhaul its guns and equipment, while some gunners were loaned to the lighter batteries still advancing. In late August 1918, acting as the battery's forward observation officer, Capt Somerville found two abandoned German 7.7 cm field guns near Maricourt. With the assistance of his telephonists, he turned one gun round and fired over 100 rounds at the retreating enemy, for which he was awarded an MC. The two guns were sent home as trophies, one to the Durham RGA and one to the town of Sunderland.

=== Hundred Days Offensive ===
On 31 August, his mobile sub-group having completed its work, Maj Sandford was transferred to command one of the 6-inch howitzer batteries and Maj Charles Berkeley Lowe of the North Scottish RGA arrived from 143rd Siege Bty to command 94th Siege Bty. On 9 September the battery was ordered to join 23rd Bde HQ at Templeux-la-Fosse, and gun positions were prepared at Villers-Faucon. Because of the semi-mobile nature of the fighting during the Hundred Days Offensive, the 9.2-inch howitzers had to be sited well forward amongst the field gun lines to keep the enemy in range for as long as possible. The tractors dragged the guns over 20 miles (32 km) in a day to reach these positions, and they were mounted under shellfire by reduced crews (the gunners loaned o other batteries not yet having returned). Two guns were taken even further forward but still arrived by midnight.

From Villers-Faucon, 94th Siege Bty supported the minor operations by which Fourth Army closed up to the Hindenburg Line, followed by the Battle of Épehy and the capture of Ronssoy (18 September). The battery was then ordered into the ruins of Ronssoy, which involved hauling the guns across shell-holed country by night and cramming the guns into limited space at the west end of the ruins. The village was under constant harassing fire with gas and HE, and casualties were heavy. Getting ammunition up the terrible roads was a serious problem. From these positions the battery supported Australian Corps (with II US Corps under command) in its attack on the Hindenburg Line at the Battle of the St Quentin Canal (29 September), for which the bombardment began on 26 September. The US troops had to attempt to gain some preliminary objectives before the main attack went in. Despite some shortcomings, the Australian–US attack was a success.

During the subsequent advance the 9.2-inch howitzers were ordered to stand fast: their vehicles made too many demands on the inadequate road system. 23rd Brigade therefore advanced (under XIII Corps) without 94th Siege Bty, which remained at Ronssoy, repairing damage and undergoing training. The gunners also salvaged abandoned German guns from the surrounding battlefields, collecting over 20 in a couple of weeks. The battery also provided reconnaissance parties under Capt Somerville to 23rd Bde (temporarily commanded by Maj Sandford) during the swift-moving battles, while Maj Lowe acted as FOO for a 6-inch howitzer battery during the Battle of the Selle. During this battle, on 23 October, Lowe also led a party from 94th Siege Bty close behind the infantry attacking through Pommereuil, with the role of turning captured guns on the enemy. They succeeded in repairing one 7.7 cm gun of a captured battery and firing 200 rounds.

94th Siege Bty was brought into the line once more for the Battle of the Sambre, which proved to be the BEF's last set-piece attack. On 29 October it came into action with Nos 1, 3, 4 and 6 guns at Bousies, just 1,500 yards (1,400 m) from the German lines. XIII attacked across the Sambre Canal at Landrecies and through the Forêt de Mormal on 4 November and advanced out of range on 5 November. 94th Siege Bty was still at Bousies when the Armistice with Germany came into force on 11 November.

== Disbandment ==
23rd Brigade, RGA was selected to go to Germany to form part of the Army of Occupation, without its 9.2-inch howitzer battery. 94th Siege Bty transferred to 47th Bde, RGA, and proceeded with its ASC column to billets in Beauvois, between Le Cateau and Cambrai. Demobilisation began in early 1919, and by February the battery was down to cadre strength, while 60 men were transferred to the Army of Occupation. 94th Siege Bty was intended to form 144th Bty RGA in the interim order of battle for the postwar army, but this was rescinded after the signing of the Treaty of Versailles. The cadre crossed to Dover on 24 June 1919 and the battery was disbanded.

During its service 94th Siege Bty lost one officer and 39 ORs (including attached ASC) killed in action, died of wounds, in accidents, or of sickness.

== See also ==
- Newsreel film of a 9.2-inch howitzer being fired.
