= Francis Sandford, 1st Baron Sandford =

British civil servant

Francis Richard John Sandford, 1st Baron Sandford, KCB, PC (14 May 1824 – 31 December 1893), known as Sir Francis Sandford between 1863 and 1891, was a British civil servant. He was Permanent Under-Secretary of State for the Committee of Council on Education between 1870 and 1884, in which role he was instrumental in implementing the Elementary Education Act 1870 (33 & 34 Vict. c. 75).

== Background and education ==
The member of an old Shropshire family, Sandford was the son of Sir Daniel Sandford by Cecilia Catherine Charnock, daughter of John Charnock. He was the grandson of the Right Reverend Daniel Sandford, Bishop of Edinburgh, and the brother of Sir Herbert Sandford, Executive Commissioner to the Melbourne Exhibition of 1880, and the Right Reverend Daniel Sandford, Bishop of Tasmania. He was educated at the Glasgow High School, the Grange School at Sunderland, the University of Glasgow and as a Snell exhibitioner at Balliol College, Oxford, where he obtained a first class in Literae Humaniores.

== Career ==
Sandford entered the Education office in 1848, where he was to remain except for short interludes until 1884. In 1862 he was organising secretary for the International Exhibition of that year and from 1868 to 1870 he was Assistant Under-Secretary at the Colonial Office. In 1870 he was made Permanent Under-Secretary of State for the Committee of Council on Education. He played an important role in the implementation of the Elementary Education Act 1870 (33 & 34 Vict. c. 75) introduced by William Edward Forster. Sandford combined this role with that of secretary to the Scottish Education department and to the science and art department, offices which were later split between separate individuals. According to the Dictionary of National Biography the "...work he performed in these capacities was appreciated by statesmen of all political parties".

In 1884 Sandford was made a charity commissioner under the London Parochial Charities Act and in 1885 he was vice-chairman of the commissioners under the Redistribution of Seats Act. From 1885 to 1887 he was Under-Secretary for Scotland. He was knighted in 1863, made a Companion of the Order of the Bath (CB) in 1871 and a Knight Commander of the Order of the Bath (KCB) in 1879 and sworn of the Privy Council in 1885. In 1891 he was raised to the peerage as Baron Sandford, of Sandford in the County of Salop.

== Personal life ==
Lord Sandford married Margaret Findlay, daughter of Robert Findlay, of Botwich Castle, Dunbartonshire, in 1849. They had no children. He died in December 1893, aged 69, when the barony became extinct. He was buried in the churchyard at his ancestral parish of Prees, Shropshire. Lady Sandford died in April 1905.

Political offices
Preceded by Ralph Lingen	Under-Secretary of State for the Committee of Council on Education; 1870–1884	Succeeded by Patrick Cumin
Peerage of the United Kingdom
New creation	Baron Sandford; 1891–1893	Extinct
