= Pas-en-Artois =

- Commune
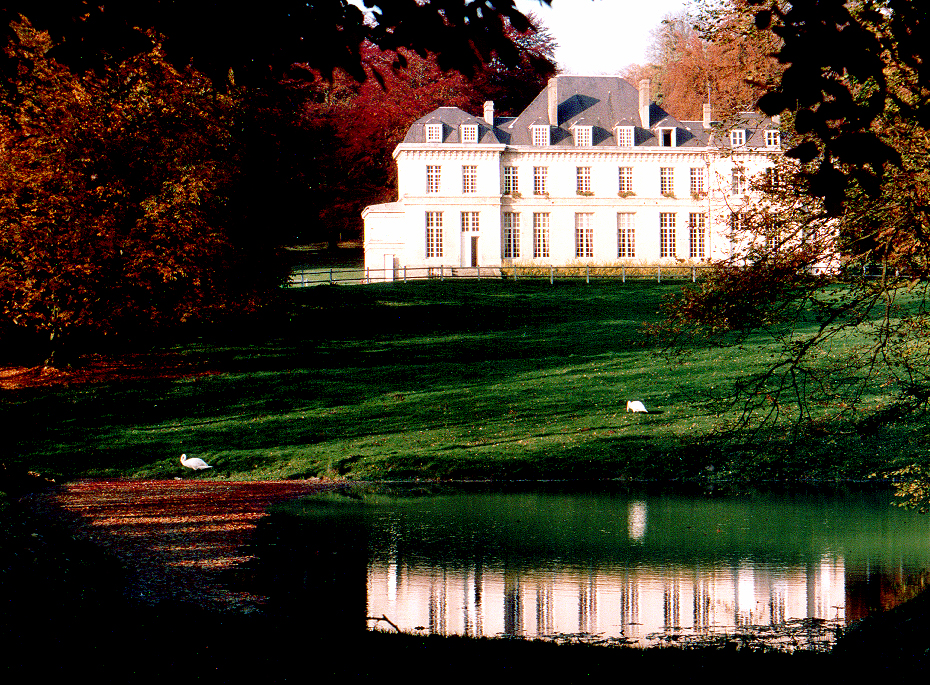
- Chateau
- Location of Pas-en-Artois
- Location within France Location within Hauts-de-France
- Coordinates: 50°09′20″N 2°29′24″E
- Country: France
- Region: Hauts-de-France
- Department: Pas-de-Calais
- Arrondissement: Arras
- Canton: Avesnes-le-Comte
- Intercommunality: CC Campagnes de l'Artois

Government
  - Mayor (2020–2026): Arnaud Douchet
- Area^{1}: 10.88 km^{2} (4.20 sq mi)
- Elevation: 98 m (322 ft)
- Highest elevation: 158 m (518 ft)
- Lowest elevation: 80 m (260 ft)
- Population (2023): 768
  - Density: 70.6/km^{2} (183/sq mi)
- Time zone: UTC+01:00 (CET)
  - Summer (DST): UTC+02:00 (CEST)
- INSEE/Postal code: 62649 /62760
- ^{1} French Land Register data, which excludes lakes, ponds, glaciers > 1 km^{2} (0.386 sq mi or 247 acres) and river estuaries.

Pas-en-Artois (French pronunciation: [pa ɑ̃.n‿aʁtwa], literally Pas in Artois; Picard: Pos-in-Artoé) is a commune in the Pas-de-Calais department in the Hauts-de-France region of France.

== Geography ==
Pas-en-Artois is situated 16 miles (26 km) southwest of Arras, at the junction of the D1, D6 and D25 roads, in the valley of the river Kilienne, a small tributary of the Authie.

== Population ==
Historical population
Year	Pop.	±% p.a.
1968	913	—
1975	959	+0.70%
1982	948	−0.16%
1990	925	−0.31%
1999	938	+0.16%
2007	810	−1.82%
2012	807	−0.07%
2017	762	−1.14%
2023	768	+0.13%
Source: INSEE

== Places of interest ==
- The church of St.Martin, dating from the seventeenth century.
- The seventeenth-century chateau.

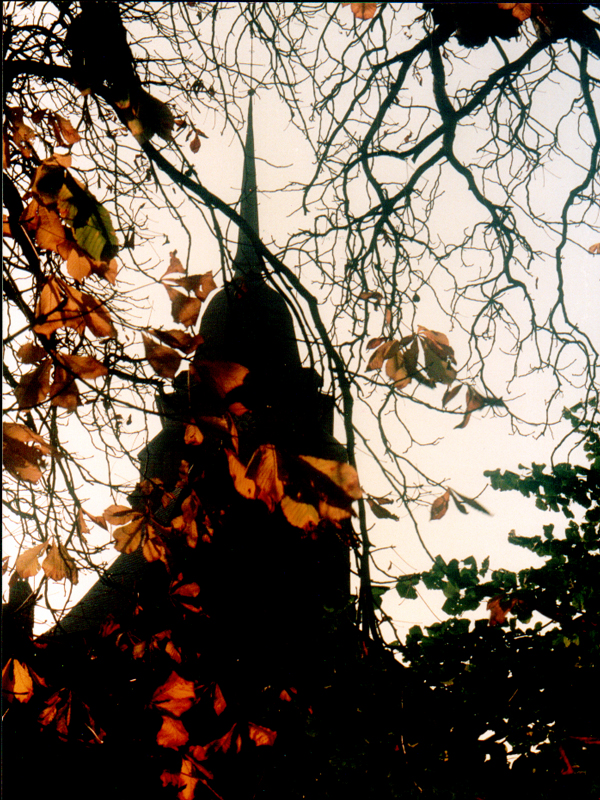
The church

== See also ==
- Communes of the Pas-de-Calais department
