= Daniel Sandford (bishop of Tasmania) =

Australian Anglican bishop

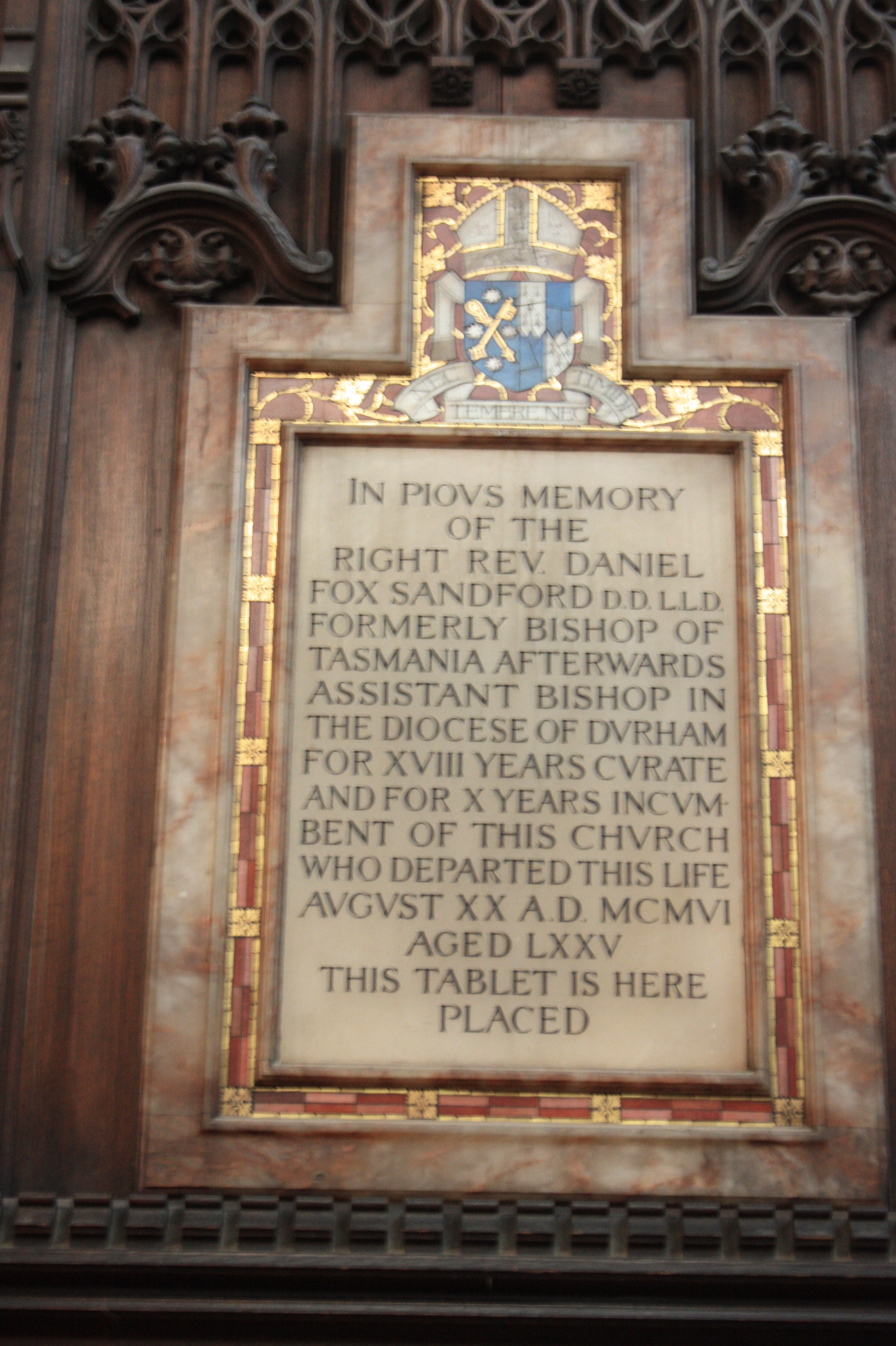
Memorial to Rev Daniel Fox Sandford, St John's, Edinburgh

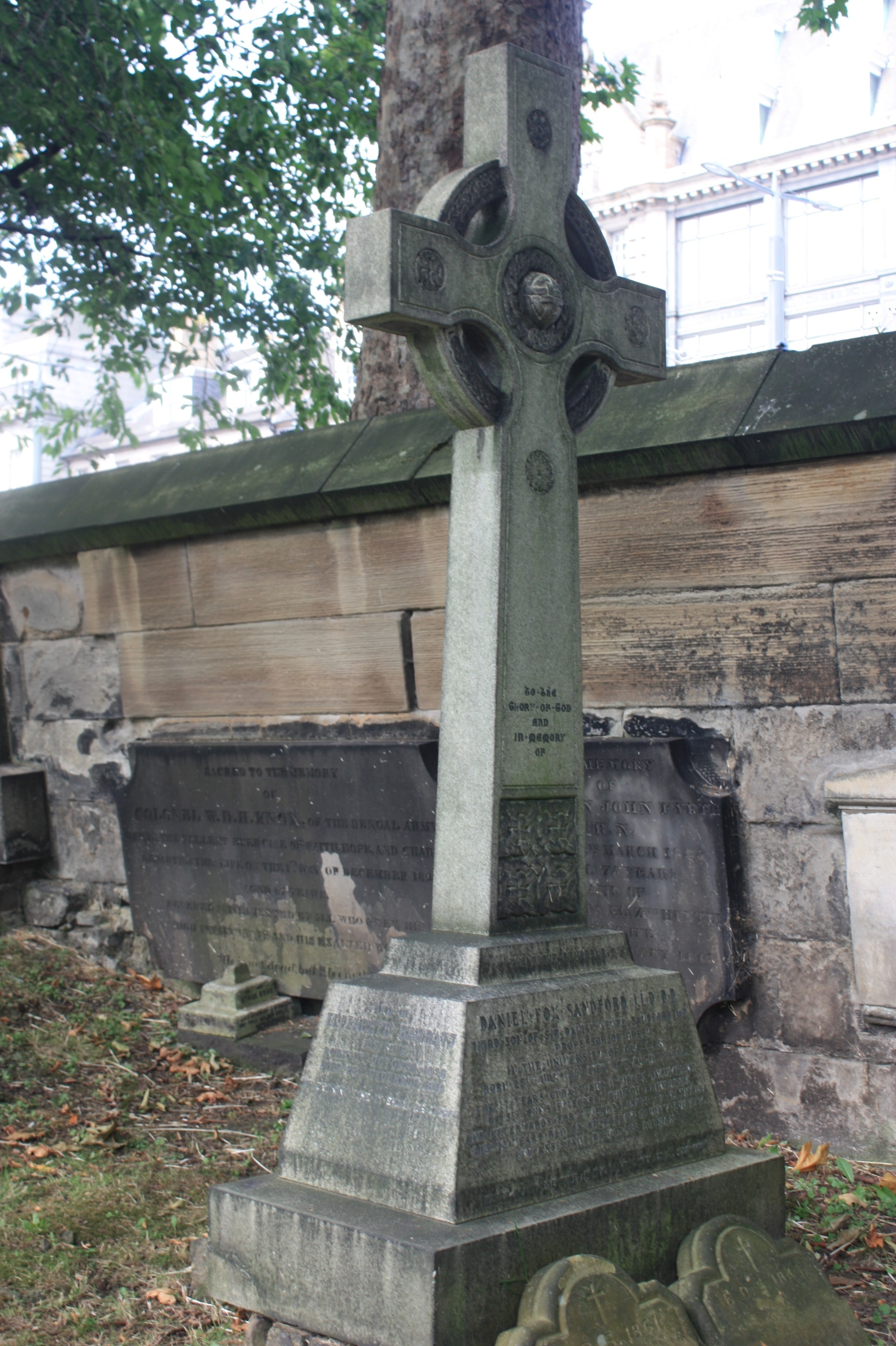
Daniel Fox Sandford's grave, St Johns, Princes Street, Edinburgh

Daniel Fox Sandford, FRSE (25 July 1831 – 20 August 1906) was the Anglican Bishop of Tasmania from 1883 until 1889.

== Life ==
Sandford was born in Glasgow on 25 July 1831 the son of Professor (later Sir) Daniel Kyte Sandford, professor of Greek at Glasgow University, and his wife "Miss Charnock". His paternal grandfather was Daniel Sandford, Bishop of Edinburgh.

He studied divinity at Glasgow University and was ordained in 1854.

He was Chaplain to the Bishop of Edinburgh. During this time he lived at Ashfield Cottage on Greenhill Gardens in western Edinburgh. In 1864 he was elected a Fellow of the Royal Society of Edinburgh. His proposer was Peter Guthrie Tait.

Subsequently, a vicar, then canon within the Edinburgh area he was elevated to the colonial episcopate in 1883, with the title of Bishop of Tasmania. Returning to Great Britain six years later he became Rector of Boldon and coadjutor bishop to Joseph Lightfoot and Brooke Foss Westcott, two successive Bishops of Durham for thirteen years. He retired as Rector of Boldon and as assistant bishop in late 1902, owing to his poor health.

Sandford is buried in the upper terrace of St John's Church at the west end of Princes Street in Edinburgh.

== Family ==
His brothers were the 1st Baron Sandford and Sir Herbert Sandford.

His uncle was the legal author Erskine Douglas Sandford, FRSE.
