= Daniel Sandford (scholar) =

Scottish classical scholar (1798–1838)

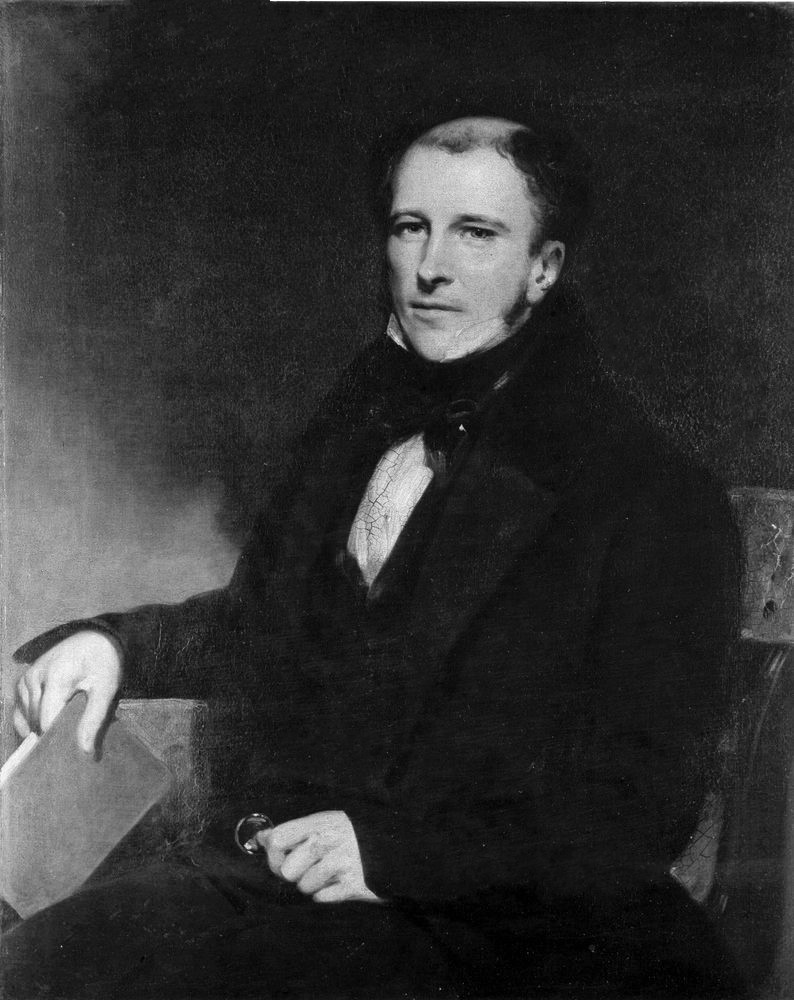
Sir Daniel Sandford.

Sir Daniel Keyte Sandford MP DCL (3 February 1798 – 4 February 1838) was a Scottish scholar who studied Greek. He stood twice for parliament and briefly sat in the House of Commons from 1834 to 1835.

== Early life ==
Sandford was born at 3 North Castle Street in Edinburgh, the second son of the Right Reverend Daniel Sandford, Bishop of Edinburgh. After receiving the rudiments of his education under the superintendence of his father, who died in January 1830, he was sent to the Edinburgh High School, and afterwards to the University of Edinburgh, where he distinguished himself by his progress in classical learning. In 1813 he was placed under the care and tuition of his godfather, Mr. Keyte, at Runcorn, Cheshire, and remained there for two or three years, pursuing his studies with enthusiasm and success.

In 1817 Sandford was entered as a commoner of Christ Church, Oxford. At the public examination in Easter term, 1820, he was placed in the first class, in Literae Humaniores, and on 20 October, the same year, he took his degree of B.A. In 1821 he gained the Chancellor’s prize for an English essay on "The Study of Modern History" and on 25 May 1825 he proceeded to the degree of M.A., as a grand compounder.

Sandford was a Freemason, and in 1818 while at Oxford he became one of the founders of the Apollo University Lodge, the principal masonic lodge for members of Oxford University.

== Professor of Greek ==
The Greek chair in the University of Glasgow having become vacant, by the death of Professor James Young, Sandford, although an Episcopalian, was, on the recommendation of men of all parties, elected his successor in September 1821, at the early age of 23. In the beginning of the session of that year he entered on the duties, and by his unrivalled skill as a teacher, and the enthusiasm of his classic genius, he soon awakened a love for the study of Greek literature, not only in the University of Glasgow, but throughout Scotland.

During the Catholic emancipation struggle in 1829, Professor Sandford hastened to Oxford, and gave his vote, as a member of that university, for Sir Robert Peel. In 1830, the honour of knighthood was conferred on him by King William IV, in consideration of his literary eminence.

== Member of Parliament ==
Ambitious of political distinction, on the first election under the Reform Act 1832 of members for Glasgow, in 1832, Sandford was one of six candidates for the representation of that city, on which occasion he was defeated, his name being third on the poll. In 1834 he was elected member for Paisley, and in June that year he took the degree of doctor of civil law. After sitting one session in parliament, ill health induced him to resign his seat, and in the beginning of the following winter he resumed his academic duties.

== Death ==
He died of typhus fever, at Glasgow, on 4 February 1838, aged forty, and was buried at Rothesay.

== Family ==
In 1823 Sandford married Henrietta Cecilia Charnock, by whom he had three sons and seven daughters.

Sandford’s eldest son, Francis (born 1824), became a clerk in the Education Committee of the Privy Council and in 1862 was appointed by the Commissioners, first as secretary, and then as general manager, of the 1862 International Exhibition. He rose to be Permanent Under-Secretary for Education and in 1891 was given a seat in the House of Lords.

Sandford’s other sons were Sir Herbert Sandford (born 1826), Executive Commissioner to the Melbourne Exhibition of 1880 and Daniel Sandford (1831–1906), Bishop of Tasmania.

In 1847, Sandford’s daughter Cecilia Catherine Charlotte Sandford, married the Rev. Francis Le Grix White.

== Bibliography ==
Sandford published several elementary works for the use of his class, such as:

- A translation from the German of Thiersch's Greek Grammar;
- Greek Extracts;
- Introduction to the Writing of Greek;
- Exercises in Homeric and Attic Greek, &c.

Sandford also contributed various articles to the Edinburgh Review and Blackwood's Magazine. In the latter periodical appeared some of his occasional translations of Greek poetry, as well as several eloquent and interesting papers from his pen, entitled 'Alcibiades.'

Sandford's most notable production, was an "Essay on the Rise and Progress of Literature", Glasgow, 1847, 8vo., originally written for The Popular Encyclopedia; or, Conversations Lexicon.

== Notes ==
Parliament of the United Kingdom
Preceded by Sir John Maxwell, Bt	Member of Parliament for Paisley; 1834–1835	Succeeded by Alexander Graham Speirs
