= History of the Episcopal Church (United States) =

In the United States, the history of the Episcopal Church has its origins in the Church of England, a church which stresses its continuity with the ancient Western church and claims to maintain apostolic succession. Its close links to the Crown led to its reorganization on an independent basis in the 1780s. In the nineteenth and early twentieth centuries, it was characterized sociologically by a disproportionately large number of high status Americans as well as English immigrants; for example, more than a quarter of all presidents of the United States have been Episcopalians (see List of United States Presidential religious affiliations). Although it was not among the leading participants of the abolitionist movement in the early 19th century, by the early 20th century its social engagement had increased to the point that it was an important participant in the Social Gospel movement, though it never provided much support for the Prohibitionist movement. Like other mainline churches in the United States, its membership decreased from the 1960s. This was also a period in which the church took a more open attitude on the role of women and toward homosexuality, while engaging in liturgical revision parallel to that of the Roman Catholic Church in the post Vatican II era.

== Splits and mergers of North American Anglican churches ==
Chart of splits and mergers of North American North American Anglican churches

Splits and mergers of North American Anglican churches

CoE in British America (1607)
Scottish Episcopal Church
Ordained bishops in apostolic succession
PECUSA (1785)	CoE in British North America (1783)
PECCSA (1861)	CoE in Canada (1861)
PECUSA (1865)
Diocese of Newfoundland (1867)
Church of Hawaii	REC (1873)
ACB (1879)
TEC (1898)
Anglican Church of Canada (1949)
SEC (1953)
AOC (1964)
AEC (1968)
APCK (1977)	ACC (1977)
ACCC (1979)
UECNA (1981)
TPEC (1991)	ACA (1991)
EMC (1992)
APA (1995)
AMiA (2000)
DHC (2003)
RAC (2009)	ACNA (2009)
AOC (2011)	PEARUSA (2011)
EPDS (2012)
ACNA (2016)
ACNA (2017)
ACC (2021)
ACC (2025)

== Colonial origins (1607–1775) ==
Interior of the First Church in Jamestown, Virginia

The Church of England in the American colonies began with the founding of Jamestown, Virginia, in 1607 under the charter of the Virginia Company of London. It grew slowly throughout the colonies along the east coast becoming the established church in Virginia in 1609, the lower four counties of New York in 1693, Maryland in 1702, South Carolina in 1706, North Carolina in 1730, and Georgia in 1758. By 1700, the Church of England's greatest strength was in Virginia and Maryland.

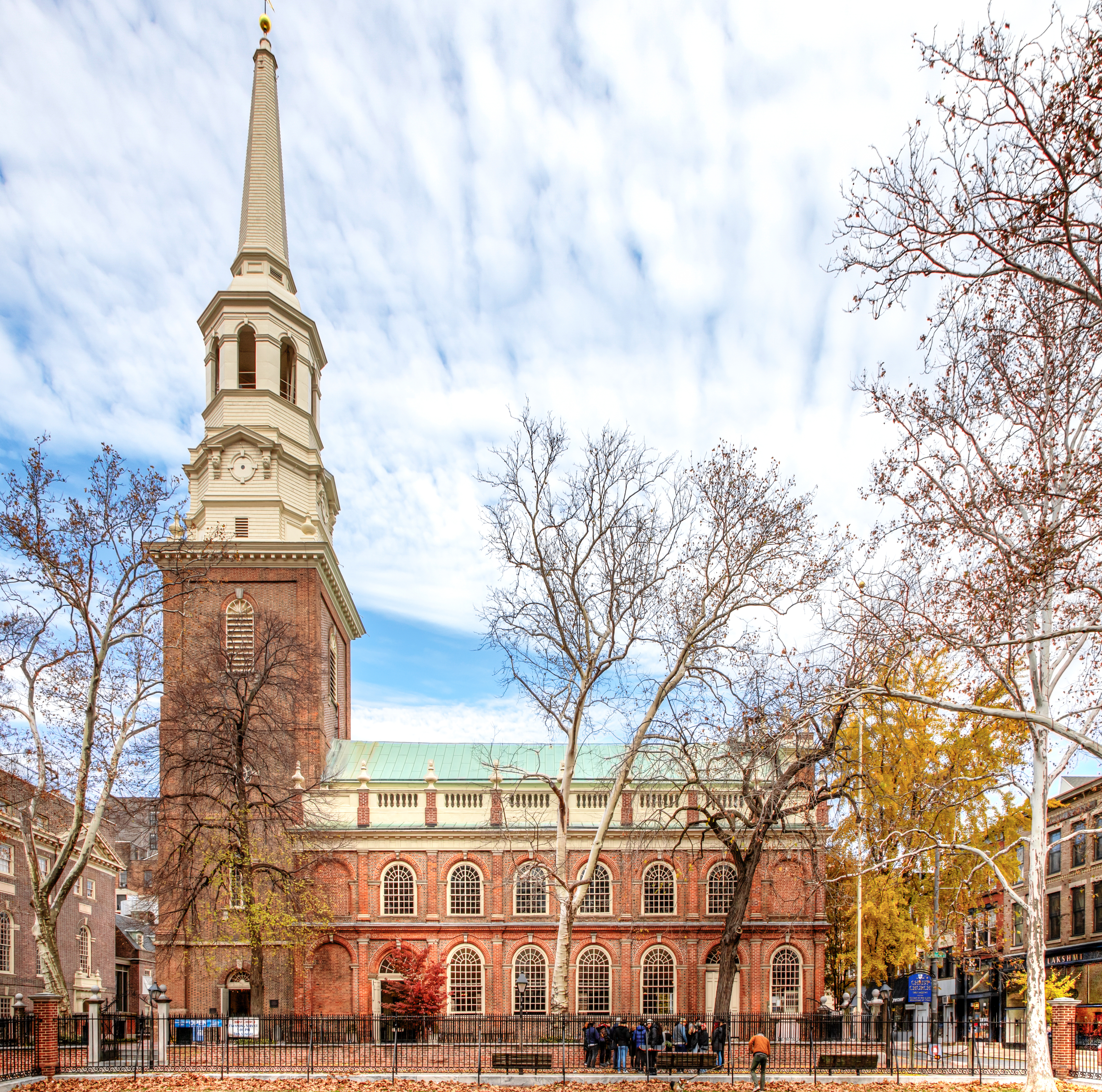
Christ Church, Philadelphia (1727)

The overseas development of the Church of England in British North America challenged the insular view of the church at home. The editors of the 1662 Book of Common Prayer found that they had to address the spiritual concerns of the contemporary adventurer. In the 1662 Preface, the editors note:

... that it was thought convenient, that some Prayers and Thanksgivings, fitted to special occasions, should be added in their due places; particularly for those at Sea, together with an office for the Baptism of such as are of Riper Years: which, although not so necessary when the former Book was compiled, ... is now become necessary, and may be always useful for the baptizing of Natives in our Plantations, and others converted to the Faith.

In 1649, Parliament granted a charter to found a missionary organization called the "Society for the Propagation of the Gospel in New England" or the "New England Society", for short. After 1702, the Society for the Propagation of the Gospel in Foreign Parts (SPG) began missionary activity throughout the colonies.

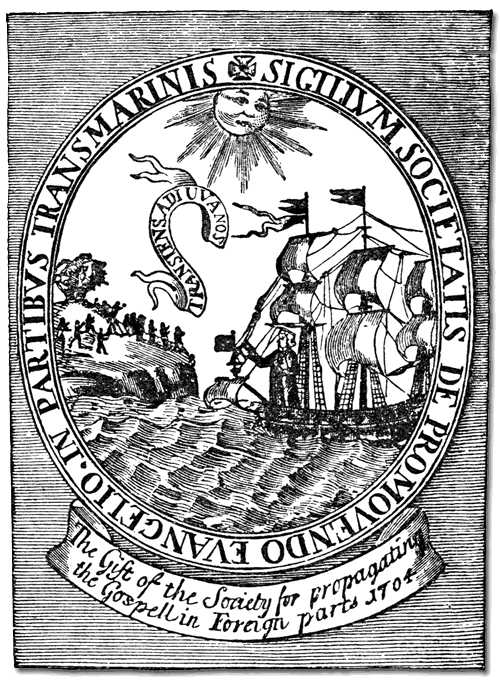
Seal of the Society for the Propagation of the Gospel in Foreign Parts

Where the Church of England was established, parishes received financial support from local taxes. With these funds, vestries controlled by local elites were able to build and operate churches as well as to conduct poor relief, maintain the roads, and other civic functions. The ministers were few, the glebes small, the salaries inadequate, and the people quite uninterested in religion, as the vestry became in effect a kind of local government. One historian has explained the workings of the parish:

The parish was a local unit concerned with such matters as the conduct and support of the parish church, the supervision of morals, and the care of the poor. Its officers, who made up the vestry, were ordinarily influential and wealthy property holders chosen by a majority of the parishioners. They appointed the parish ministers, made local assessments, and investigated cases of moral offense for referral to the county court, the next higher judicatory. They also selected the church wardens, who audited the parish accounts and prosecuted morals cases. For several decades the system worked in a democratic fashion, but by the 1660s, the vestries had generally become self-perpetuating units made up of well-to-do landowners. This condition was sharply resented by the small farmers and servants.

— Clifton Olmstead, History of Religion in the United States

From 1635, the vestries and the clergy were loosely under the diocesan authority of the Bishop of London. During the English Civil War, the episcopate was under attack, and the Archbishop of Canterbury, William Laud, was beheaded in 1645. Thus, the formation of a North American diocesan structure was hampered and hindered. In 1660, the clergy of Virginia petitioned for a bishop to be appointed to the colony; the proposal was vigorously opposed by powerful vestrymen, wealthy planters, who foresaw their interests being curtailed. Subsequent proposals from successive Bishops of London for the appointment of a resident suffragan bishop, or another form of office with delegated authority to perform episcopal functions, met with equally robust local opposition. No bishop was ever appointed.

The Society for the Propagation of the Gospel, with the support of the Bishop of London, wanted a bishop for the colonies. Strong opposition arose in the South, where a bishop would threaten the privileges of the lay vestry. Opponents conjured up visions of "episcopal palaces, or pontifical revenues, of spiritual courts, and all the pomp, grandeur, luxury and regalia of an American Lambeth". According to Patricia Bonomi, 'John Adams would later claim that "the apprehension of Episcopacy" contributed as much as any other cause to the American Revolution, capturing the attention "not only of the inquiring mind, but of the common people... . The objection was not merely to the office of a bishop, though even that was dreaded, but to the authority of parliament, on which it must be founded"'.

== Revolution and reorganization (1775–1800) ==
=== American Revolution (1775–1783) ===
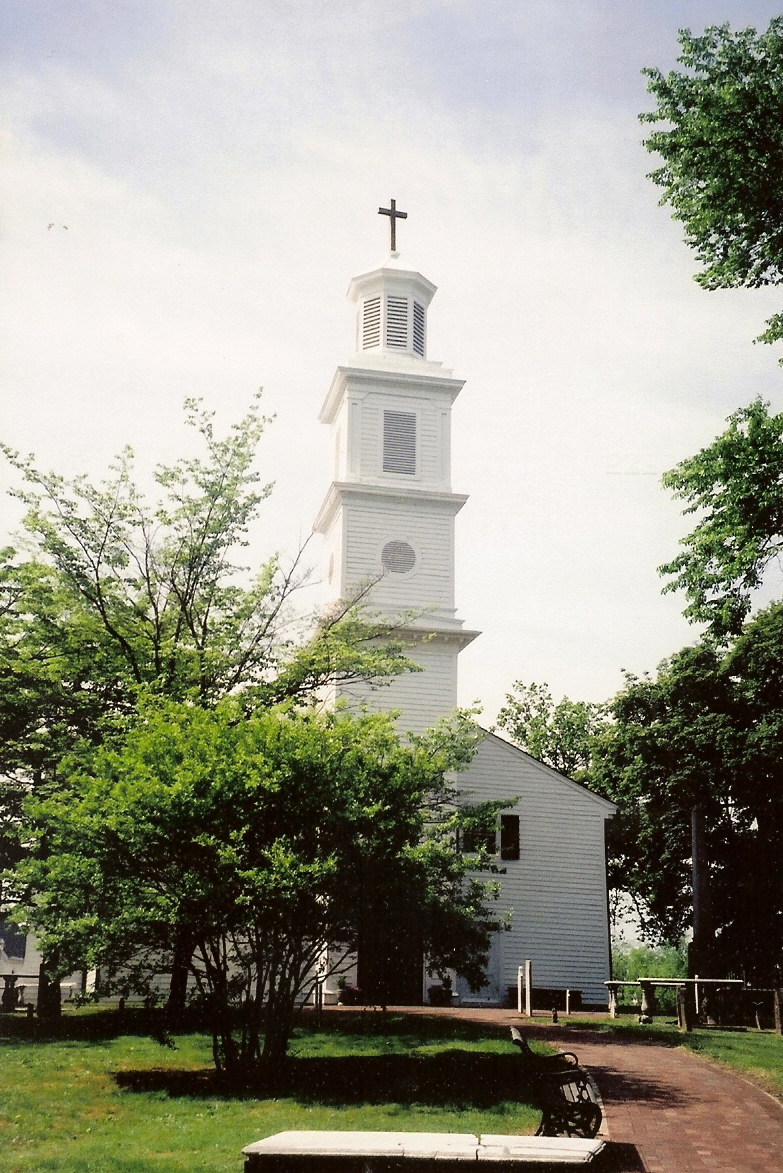
St. John's Episcopal Church is the oldest church in Richmond, Virginia, and the site of the Second Virginia Convention where Patrick Henry delivered his 1775 "Give me liberty or give me death!" speech.

Embracing the symbols of the British presence in the American colonies, such as the monarchy, the episcopate, and even the language of the Book of Common Prayer, the Church of England almost drove itself to extinction during the upheaval of the American Revolution. Anglicans leaders realized, in the words of William Smith's 1762 report to the Bishop of London that, "The Church is the firmest Basis of Monarchy and the English Constitution." The danger he saw was that if dissenters of "more Republican ... Principles [with] little affinity to the established Religion and manners" of England ever gained the upper hand, the colonists might begin to think of "Independency and separate Government". Thus "in a Political as well as religious view", Smith stated emphatically, the church should be strengthened by an American bishop and the appointment of "prudent Governors who are friends of our Establishment". However, republicanism was rapidly gaining strength and opposition to an Anglican bishop in America was fierce.

More than any other denomination, the American Revolution divided both clergy and laity of the Church of England in America, and opinions covered a wide spectrum of political views: Patriots, conciliators, and Loyalists. On one hand, Patriots saw the Church of England as synonymous with "Tory" and "redcoat". On the other hand, about three-quarters of the signers of the Declaration of Independence were nominally Anglican laymen, including Thomas Jefferson, William Paca, and George Wythe, not to mention commander-in-chief George Washington. A large fraction of prominent merchants and royal appointees were Anglicans and loyalists. About 27 percent of Anglican priests nationwide supported independence, especially in Virginia. Almost 40 percent (approaching 90 percent in New York and New England) were Loyalists. Out of 55 Anglican clergy in New York and New England, only three were Patriots, two of those being from Massachusetts. In Maryland, of the 54 clergy in 1775, only 16 remained to take oaths of allegiance to the new government.

Amongst the clergy, more or less, the northern clergy were Loyalist and the southern clergy were Patriot. Partly, their pocketbook can explain clergy sympathies, as the New England colonies did not establish the Church of England and clergy depended on their SPG stipend rather than their parishioners' gifts, so that when war broke out in 1775, these clergy looked to England for both their paycheck and their direction. Where the Church of England was established, mainly the southern colonies, financial support was local and loyalties were local. Of the approximately three hundred clergy in the Church of England in America between 1776 and 1783, over 80 percent in New England, New York, and New Jersey were Loyalists. This is in contrast to the less than 23 percent Loyalist clergy in the four southern colonies. In two northern colonies, only one priest was a Patriot—Samuel Provoost, who would become a bishop, in New York and Robert Blackwell, who would serve as a chaplain in the Continental Army, in New Jersey.

Many Church of England clergy remained Loyalists because they took their two ordination oaths very seriously. The first oath arises from the Church of England canons of 1604 where Anglican clergy must affirm that the king,

within his realms of England Scotland, and Ireland, and all other his dominions and countries, is the highest power under God; to whom all men ... do by God's laws owe most loyalty and obedience, afore and above all other powers and potentates in earth.

Thus, all Anglican clergy were obliged to swear publicly allegiance to the king. The second oath arose out of the Act of Uniformity of 1662 where clergy were bound to use the official liturgy as found in the Book of Common Prayer and to read it verbatim. This included prayers for the king and the royal family and for the British Parliament. These two oaths and problems worried the consciences of clergy. Some were clever in their avoidance of these problems. Samuel Tingley, a priest in Delaware and Maryland, rather than praying "O Lord, save the King" opted for evasion and said "O Lord, save those whom thou hast made it our especial Duty to pray for."

Charles Inglis. Rector of Trinity Church, New York. Loyalist clergy who preached to George Washington and defied a patriot militia company.

In general, Loyalist clergy stayed by their oaths and prayed for the king or else suspended services. By the end of 1776, Anglican churches were closing. An SPG missionary would report that of the colonies of Pennsylvania, New Jersey, New York, and Connecticut which he had intelligence of, only the Anglican churches in Philadelphia, a couple in rural Pennsylvania, those in British-controlled New York, and two parishes in Connecticut were open. Anglican priests held services in private homes or lay readers who were not bound by the oaths held Morning and Evening Prayer.

Nevertheless, some Loyalist clergy were defiant. In Connecticut, John Beach conducted worship throughout the war and swore that he would continue praying for the king. In Maryland, Jonathan Boucher took two pistols into the pulpit and even pointed a pistol at the head of a group of Patriots while he preached on loyalism. Charles Inglis, rector of Trinity Church in New York, persisted in reading the royal prayers even when George Washington was seated in his congregation and a Patriot militia company stood by observing the service. The consequences of such bravado were very serious. During 1775 and 1776, the Continental Congress had issued decrees ordering churches to fast and pray on behalf of the Patriots. After Congress adopted the Declaration of Independence on July 4, 1776, several states passed laws making prayers for the king and British Parliament acts of treason.

The Patriot clergy in the south were quick to find reasons to transfer their oaths to the American cause and prayed for the success of the Revolution. One precedent was the transfer of oaths during the Glorious Revolution in England. Most of the Patriot clergy in the south were able to keep their churches open and services continued.

By the end of the Revolution, the Anglican Church was disestablished in all states where it had previously been a privileged religion. Thomas Buckley examines the debates in the Virginia legislature and local governments that culminated in the repeal of laws granting government property to the Episcopal Church (during the war Anglicans began using the terms "Episcopal" and "Episcopalian" to identify themselves). The Baptists took the lead in disestablishment, with support from Thomas Jefferson and, especially, James Madison. Virginia was the only state to seize property belonging to the established Episcopal Church. The fight over the sale of the glebes, or church lands, demonstrated the strength of certain Protestant groups in the political arena when united for a course of action.

=== Post-Revolution re-organization (1783–1789) ===
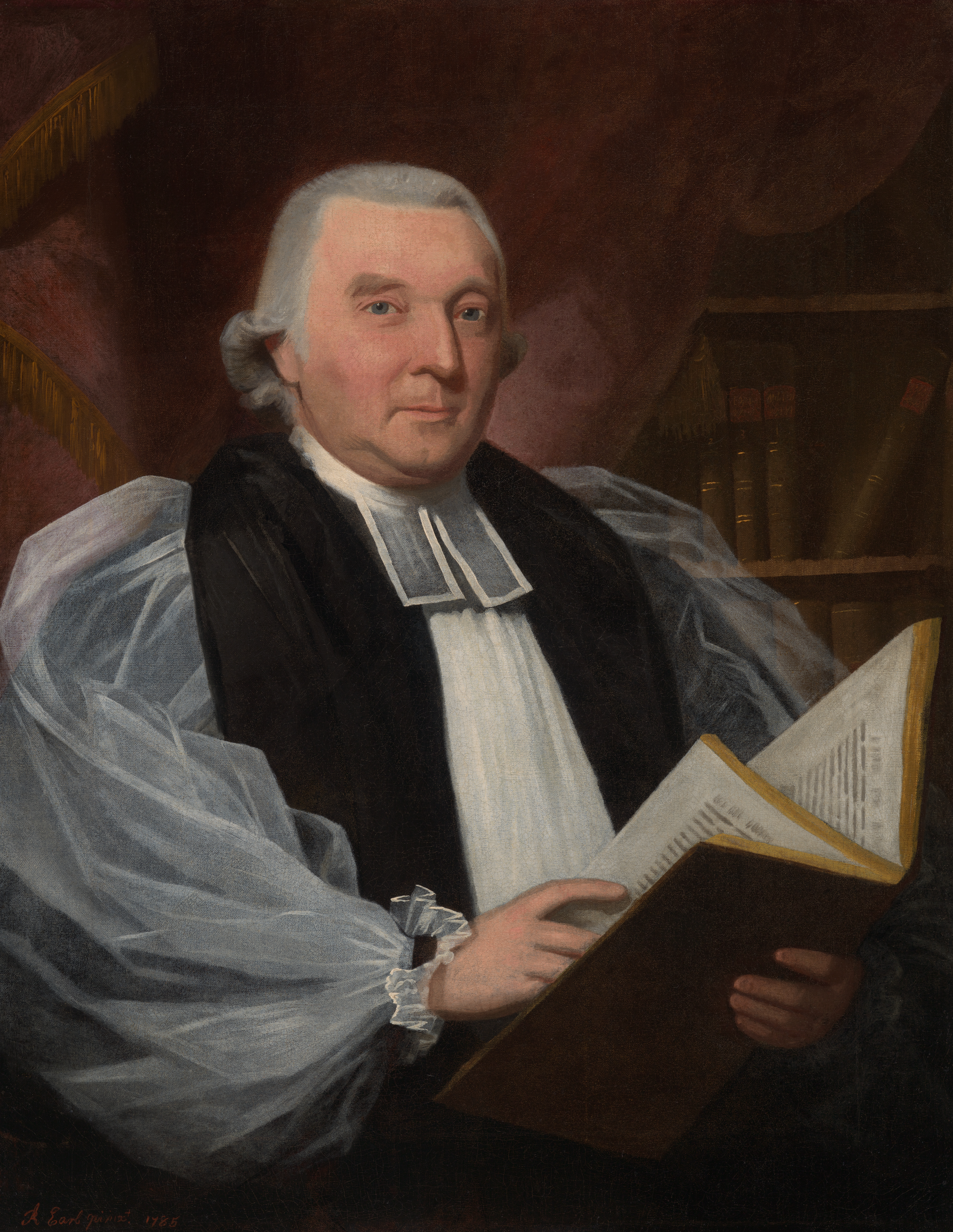
Samuel Seabury, portrait by Ralph Earl, c. 1785

When peace returned in 1783, with the ratification of the new Treaty of Paris by the Confederation Congress meeting in Annapolis, Maryland, about 80,000 Loyalists (15 percent of the then American population) went into exile. About 50,000 headed for Canada, including Charles Inglis, who became the first colonial bishop there. By 1790, in a nation of four million, Anglicans were reduced to about 10 thousand. In Virginia, out of 107 parishes before the war only 42 survived. In Georgia, Christ Church, Savannah was the only active parish in 1790. In Maryland, half of the parishes remained vacant by 1800. For a period after 1816, North Carolina had no clergy when its last priest died. Samuel Provoost, Bishop of New York, one of the first three Episcopal bishops, was so disheartened that he resigned his position in 1801 and retired to the country to study botany having given up on the Episcopal Church, which he was convinced would die out with the old colonial families.

Having lost their connection with the Church of England, Anglicans were left without organization and an episcopacy. They turned to rebuilding and reorganizing, but not everyone was in agreement on how to proceed. In the wake of the Revolution, American Episcopalians faced the task of preserving a hierarchical church structure in a society infused with republican values. Episcopacy continued to be feared after the Revolution and caused division between the low church, anti-bishop South and the high church, pro-bishop New England. Anglicans in Maryland held a convention in 1780 where the name "Protestant Episcopal Church" was first used. Conventions were organized in other states as well. In 1782, William White published an outline for organizing a national church that included both clergy and laity in its governance.

On March 25, 1783, 10 Connecticut clergy met in Woodbury, Connecticut, and elected Samuel Seabury as their prospective bishop. Seabury sought consecration in England. The Oath of Supremacy prevented Seabury's consecration in England, so he went to Scotland where the non-juring Scottish bishops consecrated him in Aberdeen on November 14, 1784. He became, in the words of scholar Arthur Carl Piepkorn, "the first Anglican bishop appointed to minister outside the British Isles". In return, the Scottish bishops requested that the Episcopal Church use the longer Scottish prayer of consecration during the Eucharist, instead of the English prayer. Seabury promised that he would endeavor to make it so. Seabury returned to Connecticut in 1785. At an August 2, 1785, reception at Christ Church on the South Green in Middletown, his letters of consecration were requested, read, and accepted. The next day the first ordinations on American soil took place when Henry Van Dyke, Philo Shelton, Ashbel Baldwin, and Colin Ferguson were ordained deacons. On August 7, 1785, Collin Ferguson was advanced to the priesthood, and Thomas Fitch Oliver was admitted to the diaconate.

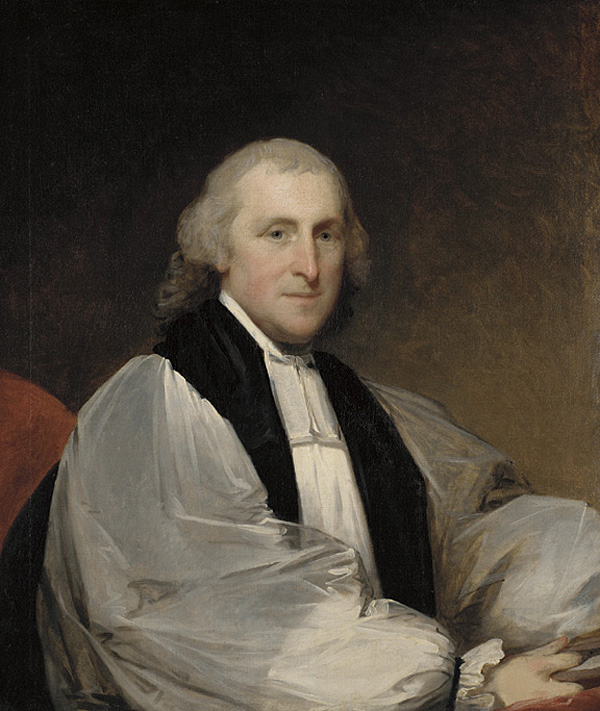
William White (Bishop of Pennsylvania)

That same year, clerical and lay representatives from seven of the nine states south of Connecticut held the first General Convention of the Protestant Episcopal Church in the United States of America. They drafted a constitution, an American Book of Common Prayer, and planned for the consecration of additional bishops. In 1787, two priests—William White of Pennsylvania and Samuel Provoost of New York—were consecrated as bishops by the Archbishop of Canterbury, the Archbishop of York, and the Bishop of Bath and Wells, the legal obstacles having been removed by the passage through Parliament of the Consecration of Bishops Abroad Act 1786. Thus, there are two branches of Apostolic succession for American bishops:

1. Through the non-juring bishops of Scotland that consecrated Samuel Seabury.
2. Through the English church that consecrated William White and Samuel Provoost.

All bishops in the Episcopal Church are ordained by at least three bishops; one can trace the succession of each back to Seabury, White and Provoost (see Succession of Bishops of the Episcopal Church). The fourth bishop of the Episcopal Church was James Madison, the first Bishop of Virginia. Madison was consecrated in 1790 under the Archbishop of Canterbury and two other English bishops. This third American bishop consecrated within the English line of succession occurred because of continuing unease within the Church of England over Seabury's nonjuring Scottish orders.

In 1789, representative clergy from nine original dioceses met in Philadelphia to ratify the church's initial constitution. The Episcopal Church was formally separated from the Church of England in 1789 so that American clergy would not be required to accept the supremacy of the British monarch. A revised American version of the Book of Common Prayer was produced for the new Church in 1789.

=== Federalist Era (1789–1800) ===
American bishops such as William White (1748–1836) provided a model of civic involvement.

== 19th century ==
=== Antebellum Church (1800–1861) ===
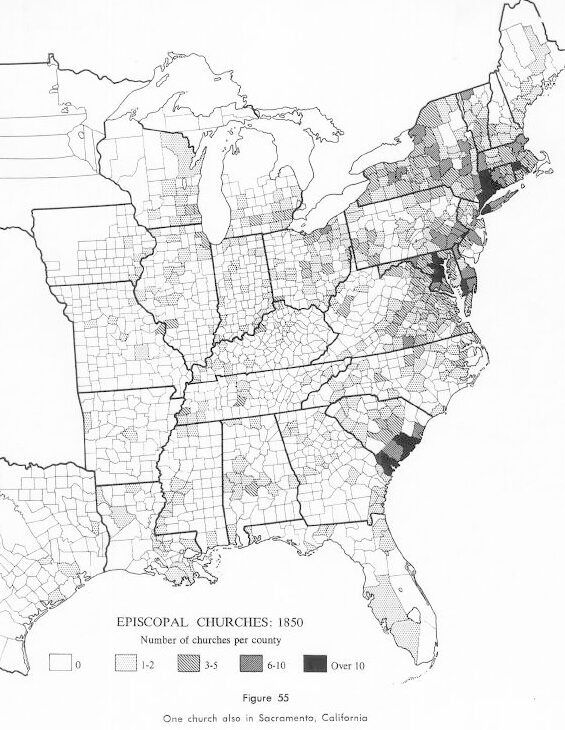
Location of churches in 1850; note strength along Atlantic coast and weakness inland; from U.S. Census.

American bishops such as William White (1748–1836) continued to provide models of civic involvement, while newly consecrated bishops such as John Henry Hobart (1775–1830), and Philander Chase (1775–1852) began to provide models of pastoral dedication and evangelism, respectively, as well.

During the first four decades of the church's existence, Episcopalians were more interested in organizing and expanding the church within their own states than in establishing centralized structures or attempting to spread their faith in other places. However, in 1821, the General Convention created a General Seminary for the whole church and established the Domestic and Foreign Missionary Society of the Protestant Episcopal Church. In 1835, the General Convention declared that all members of the Episcopal Church were to constitute the membership of the Domestic and Foreign Missionary Society and elected the first domestic missionary bishop, Jackson Kemper, for Missouri and Indiana. The first two foreign missionary bishops, William Boone for China and Horatio Southgate for Constantinople, were elected in 1844. The church would later establish a presence in Japan and Liberia. On both the domestic and foreign fields, the Episcopal Church's missions could be characterized as "good schools, good hospitals and right ordered worship".

The first society for African Americans in the Episcopal Church was founded before the American Civil War in 1856 by James Theodore Holly. Named The Protestant Episcopal Society for Promoting the Extension of the Church Among Colored People, the society argued that blacks should be allowed to participate in seminaries and diocesan conventions. The group lost its focus when Holly emigrated to Haiti, but other groups followed after the Civil War. The current Union of Black Episcopalians traces its history to the society.

=== Civil War era (1861–1865) ===
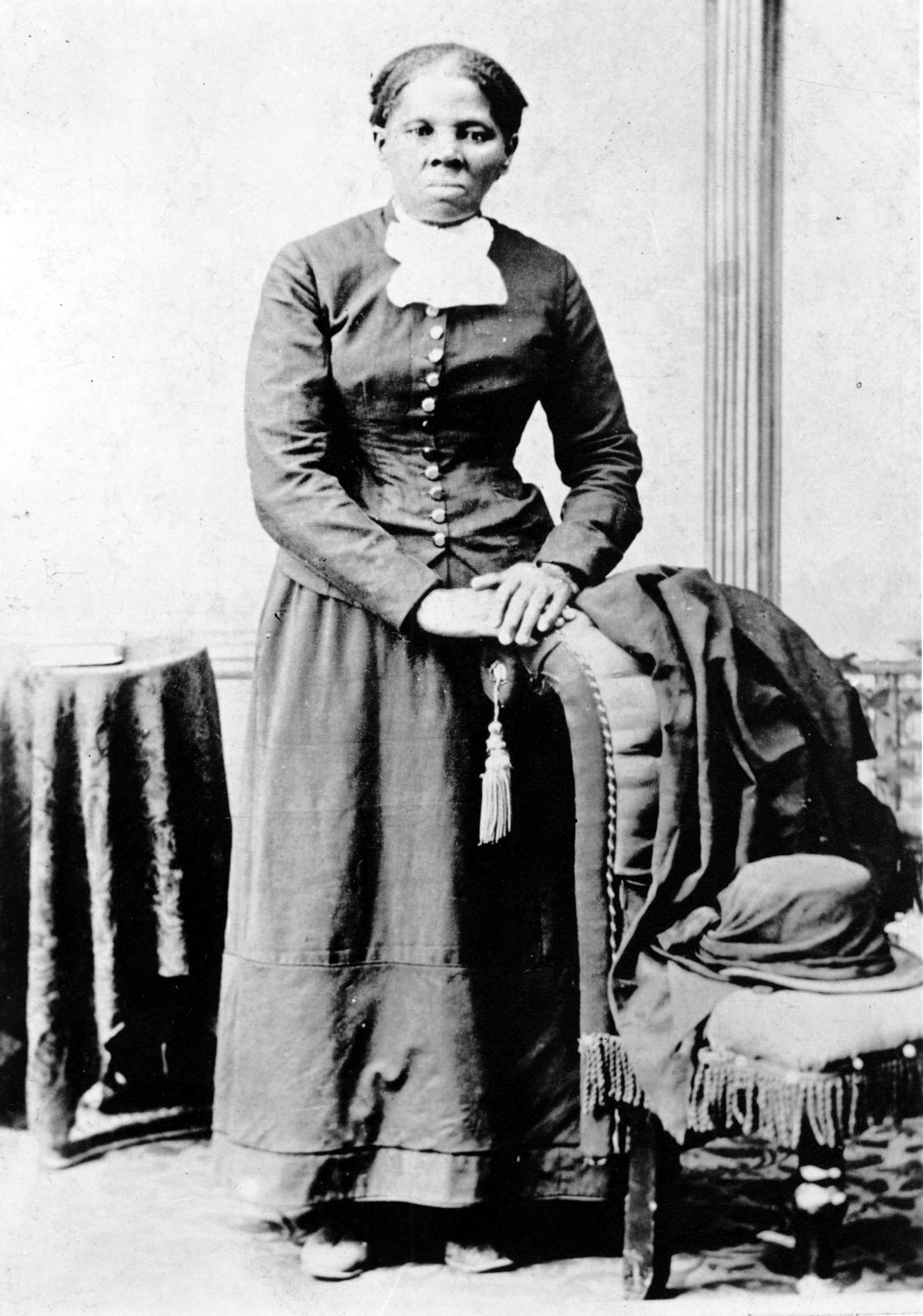
Harriet Tubman is included in the Episcopal Calendar of Saints. Picture is from 1880.

When the Civil War began in 1861, Episcopalians in the South formed its own Protestant Episcopal Church. However, in the North the separation was never officially recognized. After the war, the Presiding Bishop, John Henry Hopkins, Bishop of Vermont, wrote to every Southern bishop to attend the convocation in Philadelphia in October 1865 to pull the church back together again. Only Thomas Atkinson of North Carolina and Henry C. Lay of Arkansas attended from the South. Atkinson, whose opinions represented his own diocese better than it did his fellow Southern bishops, did much nonetheless to represent the South while at the same time paving the way for reunion. A General Council of the Southern Church meeting in Atlanta in November permitted dioceses to withdraw from the church. All withdrew by 16 May 1866, rejoining the national church.

It was also during the American Civil War that James Theodore Holly emigrated to Haiti, where he founded the Anglican Church in Haiti, which later became the largest diocese of the Episcopal Church.

=== Post-Civil War (1865–1900) ===
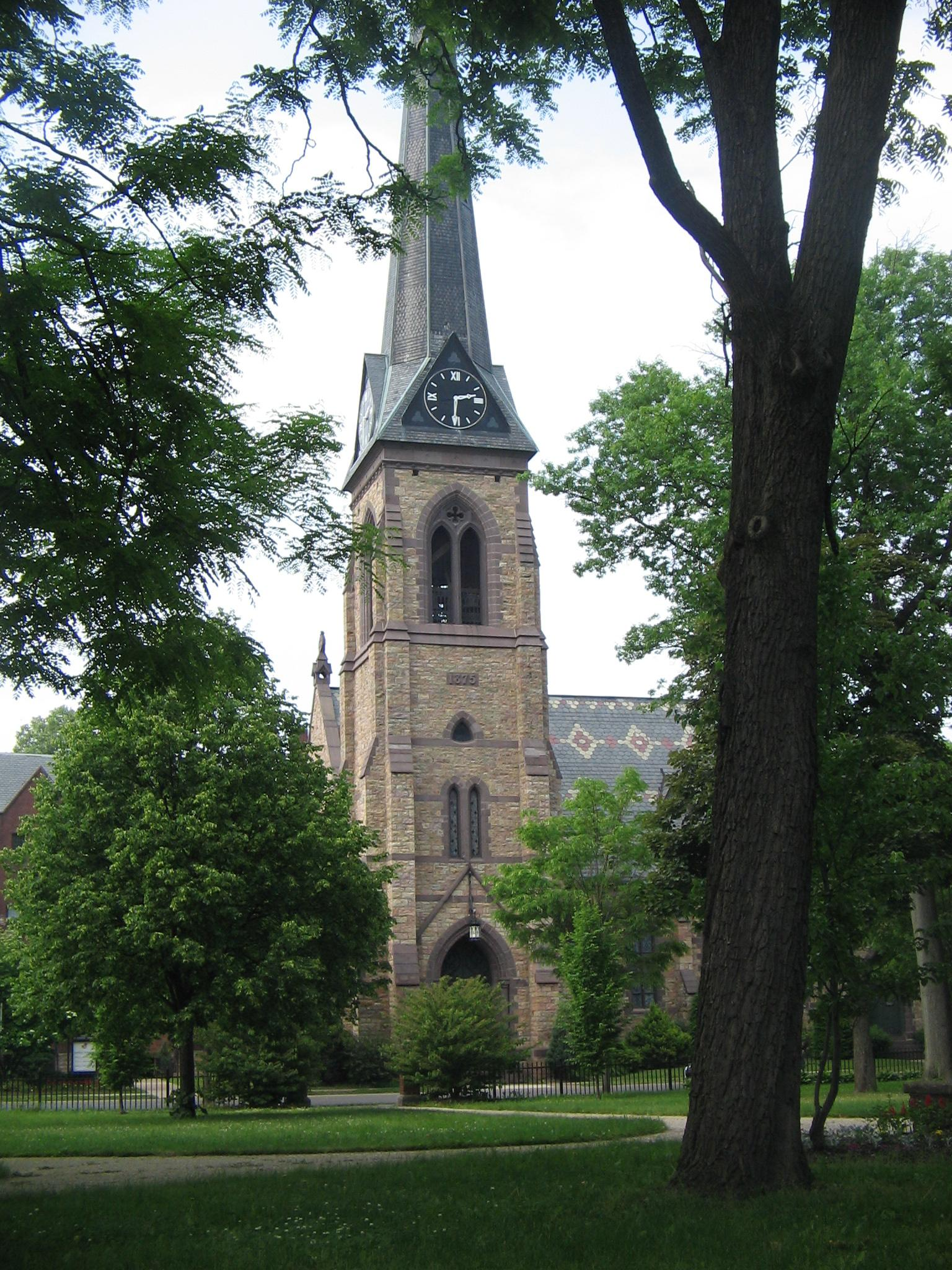
Trinity Episcopal Church in Williamsport, Pennsylvania, was built in 1875.

Women missionaries, while excluded from ordained ministry, staffed the schools and hospitals. The Woman's Auxiliary was established in 1871 and eventually became the major source of funding and personnel for the church's mission work.

James Theodore Holly became the first African-American bishop on November 8, 1874. As Bishop of Haiti, Holly was the first African American to attend the Lambeth Conference. However, he was consecrated by the American Church Missionary Society, an Evangelical Episcopal branch of the Church. In 1875, the Haitian church became a diocese of the Episcopal Church.

Samuel David Ferguson was the first black bishop consecrated by the Episcopal Church, the first to practice in the U.S. and the first black person to sit in the House of Bishops. Ferguson was consecrated on June 24, 1885, with the then-Presiding Bishop of the Episcopal Church acting as a consecrator.

By the middle of the 19th century, evangelical Episcopalians disturbed by High Church Tractarianism, while continuing to work in interdenominational agencies, formed their own voluntary societies, and eventually, in 1874, a faction objecting to the revival of ritual practices established the Reformed Episcopal Church.

== 20th century ==
In 1919, the church's structure underwent greater centralization. Constitutional changes transformed the presiding bishop into an elected executive officer (formerly, the presiding bishop was simply the most senior bishop and only presided over House of Bishops meetings) and created a national council to coordinate the church's missionary, educational, and social work. It was during this period that the Book of Common Prayer was revised, first in 1892 and later in 1928.

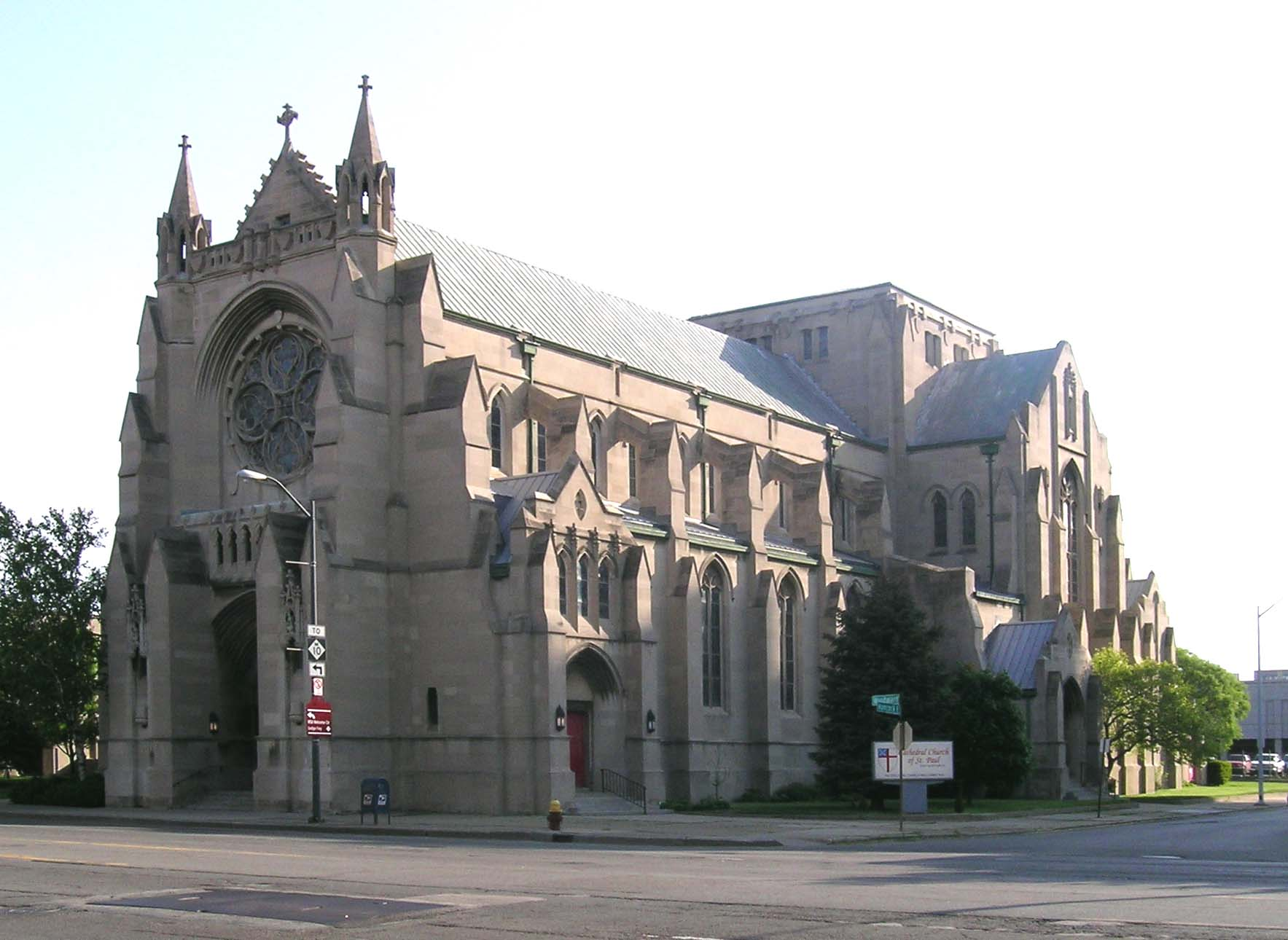
Cathedral Church of St. Paul (Detroit) (Episcopal), by Ralph Adams Cram (1907). Location of the funeral of American industrialist Henry Ford in 1947.

In 1940, the Episcopal Church's coat-of-arms was adopted. This is based on the St George's Cross, a symbol of England (mother of world Anglicanism), with a saltire reminiscent of the Cross of St Andrew in the canton, in reference to the historical origins of the American episcopate in the Scottish Episcopal Church.

After the Revolution of 1949 and the expulsion of missionaries from China, the Episcopal Church focused its efforts in Latin America.

=== Social issues and sociology ===
In the early 20th century, the Episcopal Church was shaped by the Social Gospel movement and a revived sense of being a "national church" in the Anglican tradition. A mostly female labor force formed the backbone of the church's urban outreach providing health care, education, and economic assistance to the disabled and disadvantaged. These activities made the Episcopal Church a leader in the Social Gospel movement. In its missionary work, the church saw as its responsibility to "spread the riches of American society and the richness of Anglican tradition at home and overseas". Spurred by American imperialism, the church expanded into Alaska, Cuba, Mexico, Brazil, Haiti, Honolulu, Puerto Rico, the Philippines, and the Panama Canal Zone.

Highly prominent laity such as banker J. P. Morgan, industrialist Henry Ford, and art collector Isabella Stewart Gardner played a central role in shaping a distinctive upper-class Episcopalian ethos, especially with regard to preserving the arts and history. Moreover, despite the relationship between Anglo-Catholicism and Episcopalian involvement in the arts, most of these laypeople were not inordinately influenced by religious thought. These philanthropists propelled the Episcopal Church into a quasi-national position of importance while at the same time giving the church a central role in the cultural transformation of the country. Another mark of influence is the fact that more than a quarter of all presidents of the United States have been Episcopalians (see List of United States Presidential religious affiliations).

=== Modernization ===
The modernization of the church has included both controversial and non-controversial moves related to racism, theology, worship, homosexuality, the ordination of women, the institution of marriage, and the adoption of a new prayer book, which can be dated to the General Convention of 1976.

The first women were admitted as delegates to General Convention in 1970. In 1975, Vaughan Booker, who confessed to the murder of his wife and was sentenced to life in prison, was ordained to the diaconate in Graterford State Prison's chapel in Pennsylvania, after having repented of his sins, becoming a symbol of redemption and atonement.

Regarding racism the 1976 General Convention passed a resolution calling for an end to apartheid in South Africa and in 1985 called for "dioceses, institutions, and agencies" to create equal employment opportunity and affirmative action policies to address any potential "racial inequities" in clergy placement. In 1991 the General Convention declared "the practice of racism is sin" and in 2006 a unanimous House of Bishops endorsed Resolution A123 apologizing for complicity in the institution of slavery and silence over "Jim Crow" laws, segregation, and racial discrimination.

==== Liturgical reform ====
The 1976 General Convention also approved a new prayer book, which was a substantial revision and modernization of the previous 1928 edition. It incorporated many principles of the Roman Catholic Church's liturgical movement, which had been discussed at Vatican II. This version was adopted as the official prayer book in 1979 after an initial three-year trial use. A number of conservative parishes, however, continued to use the 1928 version.

==== Women's ordination ====
Initially, the priesthood in the Episcopal Church was restricted to men only, as was true of most other Christian denominations prior to the mid-20th century and still true for some. Objections to the ordination of women have been different from time to time and place to place. Some believe that it is fundamentally impossible for a woman to be validly ordained, while others believe it is possible but inappropriate. Considerations cited include local social conditions, ecumenical implications, or the symbolic character of the priesthood, an ancient tradition including an all-male priesthood, as well as certain biblical texts.

Following upon years of discussion in the Episcopal Church and elsewhere, in 1976, the General Convention amended canon law to permit the ordination of women to the priesthood. The first women were canonically ordained to the priesthood in 1977. (Previously, the "Philadelphia Eleven" were uncanonically ordained on July 29, 1974, in Philadelphia. Another four "irregular" ordinations (the "Washington Four") also occurred in 1975 in Washington, D.C. These "irregular" ordinations were also reconciled at the 1976 GC.) Many other churches in the Anglican Communion, including the Church of England, now ordain women as deacons or priests, but only a few have women serving as bishops.

The first woman to become a bishop, Barbara Harris, was consecrated on February 11, 1989. The General Convention reaffirmed in 1994 that both men and women may enter into the ordination process, but also recognized that there is value to the theological position of those who oppose women's ordination. It was not until 1997 that the GC declared that "the ordination, licensing and deployment of women are mandatory" and that dioceses that have not ordained women by 1997 "shall give status reports on their implementation".

==== Homosexuality ====
The Episcopal Church affirmed at the 1976 General Convention that homosexuals are "children of God" who deserve acceptance and pastoral care from the church. It also called for homosexual persons to have equal protection under the law. This was reaffirmed in 1982. Despite these affirmations of gay rights, the General Convention affirmed in 1991 that "physical sexual expression" is only appropriate within the monogamous, lifelong "union of husband and wife". In 1994, the GC determined that church membership would not be determined on "marital status, sex, or sexual orientation".

The first openly gay priest, Robert Williams, was ordained by John Shelby Spong in 1989. The ordination provoked a furor. The next year Barry Stopfel was ordained a deacon by Spong's assistant, Walter Righter. Because Stopfel was not celibate, this resulted in a trial under canon law. The church court dismissed the charges on May 15, 1996, stating that "no clear doctrine" prohibits ordaining a gay or lesbian person in a committed relationship.

== 21st century Anglican issues ==
=== Gay and lesbian access to marriage and the episcopate ===
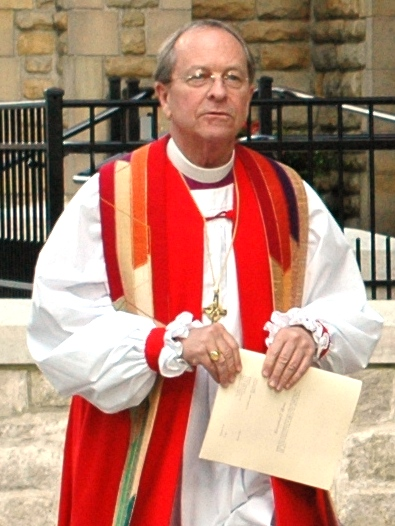
Gene Robinson, Bishop of New Hampshire

The first openly homosexual bishop, Gene Robinson, was elected on June 7, 2003, at St. Paul's Church in Concord, New Hampshire. Thirty-nine clergy votes and 83 lay votes was the threshold necessary to elect a bishop in the Episcopal Diocese of New Hampshire at that time. The clergy voted 58 votes for Robinson and the laity voted 96 for Robinson on the second ballot. Consent to the election of Robinson was given at the 2003 General Convention. The House of Bishops voted in the affirmative, with 62 in favor, 43 opposed, and 2 abstaining. The House of Deputies, which consists of laypersons and priests, also voted in the affirmative: the laity voted 63 in favor, 32 opposed, and 13 divided; the clergy voted 65 in favor, 31 opposed, and 12 divided.

In response, a meeting of the Anglican primates (the heads of the Anglican Communion's 38 member churches) was convened in October 2003, which warned that if Robinson's consecration proceeded, it could "tear the fabric of the communion at its deepest level." The primates also appointed a commission to study these issues, which issued the Windsor Report the following year. At the request of the commission issuing the Windsor Report, the Episcopal Church released To Set Our Hope on Christ on June 21, 2005, which explains "how a person living in a same gender union may be considered eligible to lead the flock of Christ."

Robinson was consecrated on November 2, 2003, in the presence of Frank Griswold, the Presiding Bishop, and 47 bishops.

The General Convention of 2003 also passed a resolution discouraging the use of conversion therapy to attempt to change homosexuals into heterosexuals.

In 2009, the General Convention responded to societal, political and legal changes in the status of civil marriage for same-sex couples by giving bishops an option to provide "generous pastoral support" especially where civil authorities have legalized same-gender marriage, civil unions, or domestic partnerships. It also charged the Standing Commission on Liturgy and Music to develop theological and liturgical resources for same-sex blessings and report back to the General Convention in 2012.

The same General Convention also voted that "any ordained ministry" is open to gay men and lesbians. The New York Times said the move was "likely to send shockwaves through the Anglican Communion." This vote ended a moratorium on ordaining gay bishops passed in 2006 and passed in spite of Archbishop Rowan Williams's personal call at the start of the convention that, "I hope and pray that there won't be decisions in the coming days that will push us further apart." A noted Evangelical scholar of the New Testament, N. T. Wright, who is also Bishop of Durham in the Church of England, wrote in The Times (London) that the vote "marks a clear break with the rest of the Anglican Communion" and formalizes the Anglican schism. However, in another resolution the Convention voted to "reaffirm the continued participation" and "reaffirm the abiding commitment" of the Episcopal Church with Anglican Communion.

=== A woman as Presiding Bishop ===
The 2006 election of The Rev. Katharine Jefferts Schori as the Church's 26th presiding bishop was controversial in the wider Anglican Communion because she is a woman and the full Anglican communion does not recognize the ordination of women. She is the only national leader of a church in the Anglican Communion who is a woman. Prior to her election she was Bishop of Nevada. She was elected at the 75th General Convention on June 18, 2006, and invested at the Washington National Cathedral on November 4, 2006.

Jefferts Schori generated controversy when she voted to confirm openly gay Gene Robinson as a bishop and for allowing blessings of same-sex unions in her diocese of Nevada.

During her time as Presiding Bishop, ten primates of the Anglican communion stated that they did not recognize Jefferts Schori as a primate. In addition, eight American dioceses rejected her authority and asked Archbishop of Canterbury Rowan Williams to assign them another national leader.

=== Conservative reactions to these developments ===
These innovations have been responded to in various ways. The opposition to Ritualism produced the Reformed Episcopal Church in 1873. Opposition to the ordination of women priests and to theological revisions incorporated into the Episcopal Church's 1979 Book of Common Prayer led to the formation of the Continuing Anglican movement in 1977; and opposition to the consecration of the first ever openly homosexual bishop led to the creation of the Anglican Church in North America. It officially organized in 2009, forming yet another ecclesiastical structure apart from the Episcopal Church. This grouping, which reported at its founding that it represented approximately 100,000 Christians through its over 700 parishes, elected former Episcopal priest Robert Duncan as its primate. The ACNA has not been received as an official member of the Anglican Communion by the Church of England, and is not in communion with the see of Canterbury, but many Anglican churches of the Global South, such as the Church of Nigeria and Church of Uganda, together representing approximately 1/3 of the worldwide Anglican Communion, have declared themselves to be in full communion with it.

The two main movements in opposition to the developments within the Episcopal Church are generally referred to as the Continuing Anglican movement and Anglican realignment.

==== Secession and realignment ====
In 1977, 1,600 bishops, clergy and lay people met in St. Louis and formed the Congress of St. Louis under the leadership of retired Episcopal bishop Albert Chambers. This began the Continuing Anglican Movement with the adoption of the Affirmation of St. Louis. Many other conservative groups have continued to break away out of frustration over the Church's position on homosexuality, the ordination of openly homosexual priests and bishops, and abortion — or rather, the way the Episcopal Church has viewed the place of Scripture in determining doctrine on those issues. In addition to those which have affiliated with one of the Continuing Anglican churches or the Anglican Church in North America, there are also congregations that have joined one of the Eastern Orthodox jurisdictions, Old Catholicism, or the Roman Catholic Church.

Five diocesan conventions have voted to withdraw from the Episcopal Church: the Diocese of San Joaquin, the Diocese of Fort Worth, the Diocese of Quincy, the Diocese of Pittsburgh, and the Diocese of South Carolina. This does not include individual congregations that have also withdrawn, as in the Diocese of Virginia where members of eight parishes voted to leave the Episcopal Church. Included were the historic Falls Church and Truro Church. These congregations then formed the Anglican District of Virginia, which became part of the Convocation of Anglicans in North America (CANA).

The first diocesan convention to vote to break with the Episcopal Church (which has 110 dioceses) was the Episcopal Diocese of San Joaquin. On December 8, 2007, the convention of the Episcopal Diocese of San Joaquin voted to secede from the Episcopal Church and join the Anglican Province of the Southern Cone, a more conservative and traditional member of the Anglican Communion located in South America. The diocese had 48 parishes. A minority of parishes and individuals reorganized the diocese and remained in the Episcopal Church. On July 21, 2009, the Superior Court of California ruled that the diocese cannot leave the Episcopal Church and that these acts were void, however, not until 2016 was litigation fully resolved and did those who remained in the Episcopal Church gain control of the property. On October 4, 2008, the convention of the Episcopal Diocese of Pittsburgh also voted to leave the Episcopal Church and join the Province of the Southern Cone. This split occurred after the House of Bishops, deposed Robert Duncan from office in September 2008. Duncan had led the diocese for 11 years. One third of the parishes and members of the Pittsburgh Diocese remained in the Episcopal Church and had received recognition as the Episcopal Diocese within a week of the convention vote.

The conventions of the Diocese of Quincy in Illinois and the Diocese of Fort Worth voted in November 2008 to leave the Episcopal Church. On November 15, 2008, the convention of the Diocese of Fort Worth, under the leadership of Jack Leo Iker and with the vote of 80 percent of the voting clergy and laity, also voted to align with the Province of the Southern Cone. As in the earlier cases, the remaining Episcopalians reorganized as a diocese. In response to the departure of Iker and the Fort Worth diocese, Jefferts Schori declared that Iker had "abandoned the communion" and joined with the local diocese in suing Iker and followers, seeking to reclaim church buildings and property. On November 16, 2009, the appellate court issued an order staying the litigation while certain procedural issues were decided by the appellate court. On April 27, 2010, the Second Court of Appeals in Fort Worth heard oral argument on issues that may determine whether the litigation will be allowed to proceed at the trial level.

Two years later the Episcopal Diocese of South Carolina declared that an earlier vote by their Standing Committee was now in effect and that they had left the Episcopal Church. The Diocese then held a special convention in November 2012 to affirm that action. However, Bishop Lawrence and his followers did not immediately join the Anglican Church of North America and remained a free standing diocese. They almost immediately sued in South Carolina Courts, claiming they were doing so to protect their property. The court ordered those staying in the Episcopal Church to refrain from calling themselves the Diocese of South Carolina. That group then sued in federal court to recover their name. Both the state court case and the federal case remain in litigation.

Jefferts Schori has criticized these moves and stated that schism is not an "honored tradition within Anglicanism" and claims schism has "frequently been seen as a more egregious error than charges of heresy." In Pittsburgh one member of the Standing Committee remained in the Episcopal Church and some members of each of the other governing bodies also remained. Those remaining in the Episcopal Church were recognized immediately by the Presiding Bishop and executive Council of the Episcopal Church as the continuation of the old diocese and began rebuilding without further help from the church. A lawsuit filed in 2003, settled in 2005, reopened in 2007 and decided 2009 with final appeals in 2010 awarded the name and diocesan property to those who remained in the Episcopal Church in Pittsburgh. In the other four dioceses where parishioners have voted to leave, the Presiding Bishop provided interim listeners and presided at an organizing convention. In all four cases, both those who left the Episcopal Church and those who remained claimed that their organizations were the "real" Episcopal Diocese. In 2016 the California Supreme Court refused to review lower court rulings recognizing those who had remained in the Episcopal Church as the legal owners of the property and name. Courts in Illinois ruled against the Episcopalians and awarded the property to the ACNA diocese.

==== Church property litigation ====
In 1993, the Connecticut Supreme Court concluded that former parishioners of a local Episcopal church could not keep the property held in the name of that parish because it found that a relationship existed between the local and general church such that a legally enforceable trust existed in favor of the general church over the local church's property.

On December 19, 2008, a Virginia trial court ruled that eleven congregations of former Episcopalians could keep parish property when the members of these congregations split from the Episcopal church to form the Anglican District of Virginia (ADV). The Episcopal Church claimed that the property belonged to it under the canon law of the Episcopal Church after appeals reached the Virginia Supreme Court, a new trial was ordered which resulted in a decision returning the property to the Episcopal Church. Subsequent appeals by those who had left the Episcopal Church were unsuccessful including an appeal by one parish to the U.S. Supreme Court in 2014.

Other rulings in Colorado and California have ordered congregations that have voted to change their associations within the Anglican Communion to return their properties to the Episcopal Church. On January 5, 2009, the California Supreme Court ruled that St. James Anglican Church in Newport Beach could not keep property held in the name of an Episcopal parish. The court concluded that even though the local church's names were on the property deeds for many years, the local churches had agreed to be part of the general church.

Property litigation in Pittsburgh began before the split when Calvary Episcopal Church filed suit against Duncan in 2003 in order to ensure diocesan property remained in the Episcopal Church. A second parish, St. Stephen's in Wilkinsburg later joined Calvary as a plaintiff. This resulted in a signed stipulation specifying that diocesan property would remain the property of the Episcopal Diocese of Pittsburgh in the Episcopal Church U.S.A., In 2009, the Judge of the Court of Common Pleas ruled that the 2005 agreement signed by Duncan to settle the Lawsuit brought by Calvary Church meant that diocesan property belonged to those remaining in the Episcopal Church. This was confirmed in January 2010 with a decision including a schedule of property to be returned. The group that left changed its name to the Anglican Diocese of Pittsburgh, but appealed the decision. In 2011, a panel of judges from the appellate court in Pennsylvania affirmed that ruling, and the full appellate court declined to review the ruling. The state supreme court also declined to hear an appeal. The Anglican Diocese of Pittsburgh announced that it would not pursue further appeals.

== See also ==
- Historical Society of the Episcopal Church
- National Episcopal Historians and Archivists
