= The Farmer Refuted =

1775 pamphlet by Alexander Hamilton

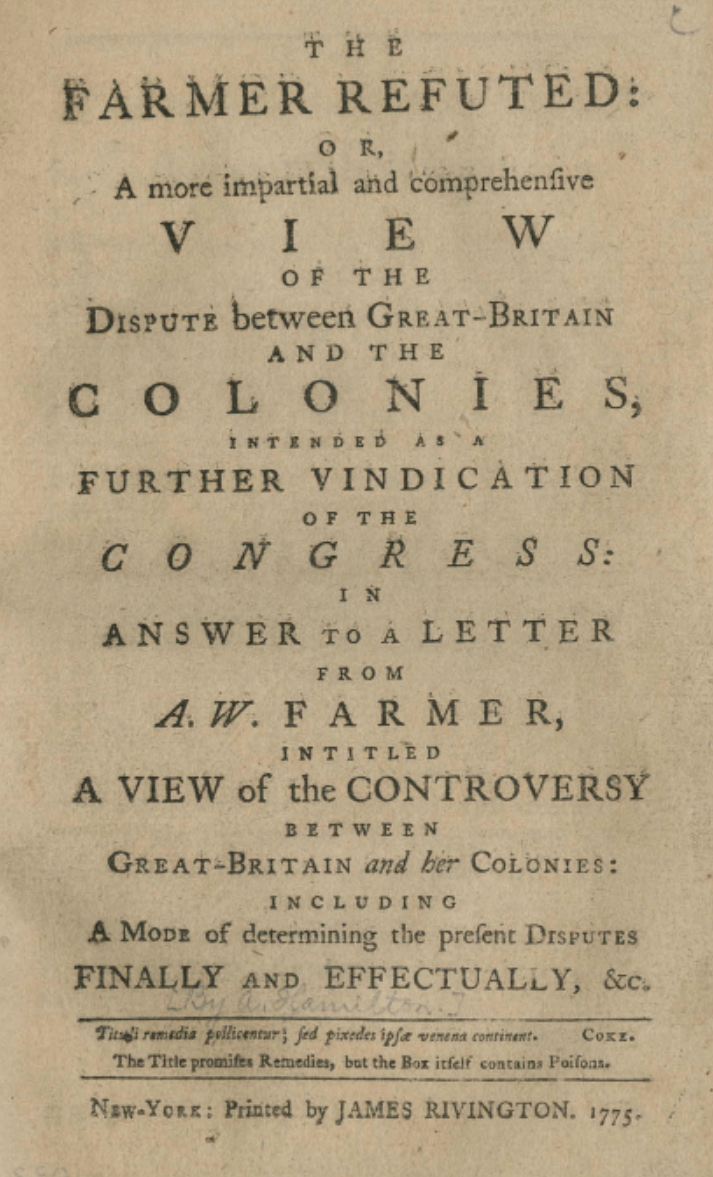
- Author: Alexander Hamilton
- Language: English
- Publication date: February 1775
- Preceded by: A Full Vindication of the Measures of Congress
- Followed by: Remarks on the Quebec Bill

The Farmer Refuted, published in February 1775, was Alexander Hamilton's second published work, a follow-up to his 1774 A Full Vindication of the Measures of Congress.

== Summary ==
In The Farmer Refuted, Alexander Hamilton addresses directly the main person to whom he was writing in opposition with his first work, Samuel Seabury. Seabury wrote under the name "A. W. Farmer", a pen name and abbreviation for 'a Westchester farmer'. Calling the writing a less than imposed "labyrinth of subtilty", Hamilton once again rebuts Seabury's claim that the Congress in Philadelphia deserved to be condemned for its conduct.

He also critiques the writings of Seabury stating that the Colonies can exist in their advocacy against British Parliament's acts while remaining loyal to the King of Great Britain, stating that it is only by "occasion" that Parliament's acts give authority to the King, Hamilton asserts his belief that, "He is king of America by virtue of a compact between us and the kings of Great Britain", and suggests that the perpetuation of his tyranny would only break the bonds of America's union.

== In popular culture ==
The Farmer Refuted is addressed in the 2015 Broadway musical Hamilton by Lin-Manuel Miranda in the song "Farmer Refuted", which is about Hamilton's arguments with Seabury.
