= A Full Vindication of the Measures of Congress =

1774 pamphlet written by Alexander Hamilton

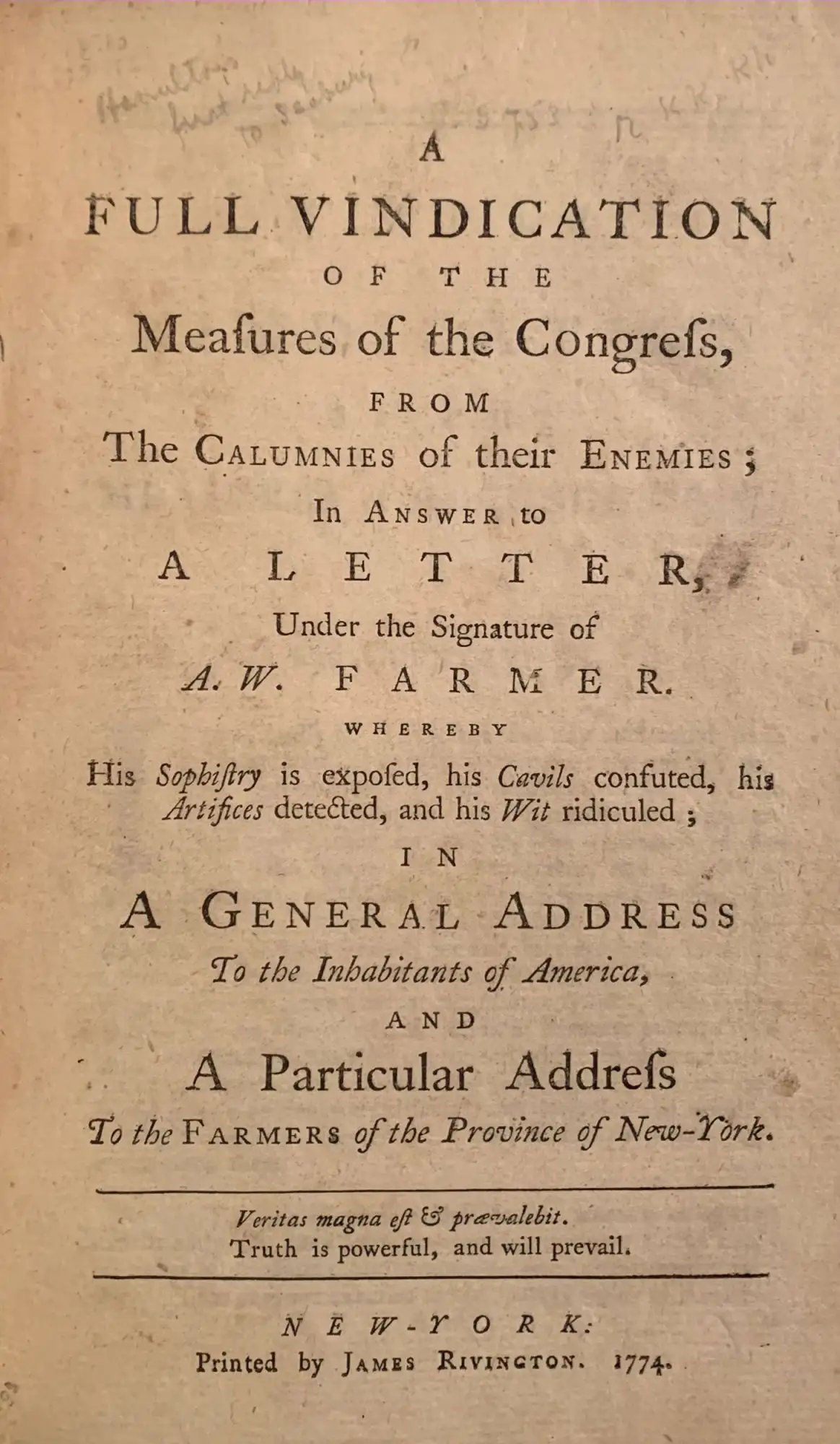
- Author: Alexander Hamilton
- Language: English
- Publication date: December 1774
- Followed by: The Farmer Refuted

A Full Vindication of the Measures of Congress was one of Alexander Hamilton's first published works, published in December 1774, while Hamilton was either a 19- or a 17-year-old student at King's College, later renamed Columbia University, in New York City.

In this pamphlet, dated December 15, 1774, Hamilton defended the actions of the First Continental Congress in Philadelphia against the accusations of author A.W. Farmer ("A Westchester Farmer"), a pseudonym of Samuel Seabury, Episcopal rector in Westchester County, New York, who wrote an incendiary loyalist pamphlet attacking the First Continental Congress, Free Thoughts on the Proceedings of the Continental Congress, dated November 16, 1774.

Most political essays of the time were written under pen names. The identity of Farmer was not known at the time Hamilton wrote his reply, although it was generally thought that the author was among the Anglican ministers who were among the most articulate Loyalists. Hamilton might have believed, as others did at the time, that the author of Free Thoughts was the president of his own college, the Reverend Myles Cooper. Cooper was indeed part of a "Loyalist literary clique" that included Seabury and Charles Inglis (later rector of Trinity Church in New York), and was aware that Seabury had written the pamphlet.

Hamilton's 35-page reply to Farmer, addressed to "Friends and Countrymen," took two to three weeks to write and is signed "A Friend to America"; it responds systematically to Farmer's argument. Hamilton warns against "the men who advise you to forsake the plain path, marked out for you by the congress" and states that "our representatives in general assembly cannot take any wise or better course to settle our differences, than our representatives in the continental congress have taken."

After A Full Vindication was published, "Farmer" (Seabury) responded with another pamphlet, A View of the Controversy, dated December 24, 1774, but not announced until January 5, 1775. Hamilton then responded with another pamphlet, The Farmer Refuted, on February 23, 1775. With these two pamphlets, Hamilton "embraced wholeheartedly the 'radical' American side" of the growing conflict with the Kingdom of Great Britain.

== Links to original sources ==
- Hamilton, Alexander (1774). A full vindication of the measures of the Congress. New York: James Rivington.
- Seabury, Samuel (1774). Free thoughts on the proceedings of the Continental Congress. London: Richardson and Urquhart.
