= Bishop Seabury Academy =

Location
- 4120 Clinton Parkway; Lawrence, Kansas 66047; United States; 38.9435°N 95.2927°W

Information
- School type: Private, Middle & High School
- Founded: 1997
- CEEB code: 171680
- Headmaster: Don Schawang
- Grades: 6 to 12
- Gender: coed
- Enrollment: 212 (2020)
- Colors: Blue; Green
- Mascot: Sammy the Seahawk, Sadie the Seahawk
- Affiliation: Episcopal
- Website: SeaburyAcademy.org

Bishop Seabury Academy is a private, co-educational, Episcopal middle school and high school (grades 6–12) in Lawrence, Kansas. The school is accredited by ISACS (Independent Schools Association of the Central States) and is a member of KSHSAA. It is named for Samuel Seabury, first bishop of the Episcopal Church in the United States and a British Loyalist during the American Revolution. It is currently one of two private middle/high schools in Lawrence.

== History ==
Bishop Seabury Academy was founded in 1997. The Academy opened with about 32 students at 1411 E. 1850 Road, east of Lawrence in what used to be the Kaw Valley School. Kris Pueschel was the head of school until February 2001. Chris Carter was installed as the new head of school in the 2001–02 school year. In the spring of 2002, Brendan Mark became the school's first graduate.

In 2003, the school purchased the Alvamar Raquetball & Tennis Club and renovated the space to create a new campus that opened its doors on August 20 to 113 students. In December 2006, the school announced a $1.5 million 10th Anniversary Capital Campaign to add Reese Hall, a building to house fine arts and languages.

In 2007, Carter resigned and Don Schawang, who had taught at the school since 2000, was appointed Headmaster. In 2012, with the addition of a 6th grade, the school raised $1.18 million to expand the campus and add a FEMA emergency shelter. In 2016, the Academy was named #1 Private School in Kansas by Niche, and the school has retained that position for almost every year since.

In 2018, the student population had nearly doubled since moving to the Clinton Parkway campus in 2003, and the school launched a new capital campaign to fund its most significant campus expansion, which was completed for fall of 2020.
