= St. James Episcopal Church (New London, Connecticut) =

Historic church in Connecticut, United States

St James Church
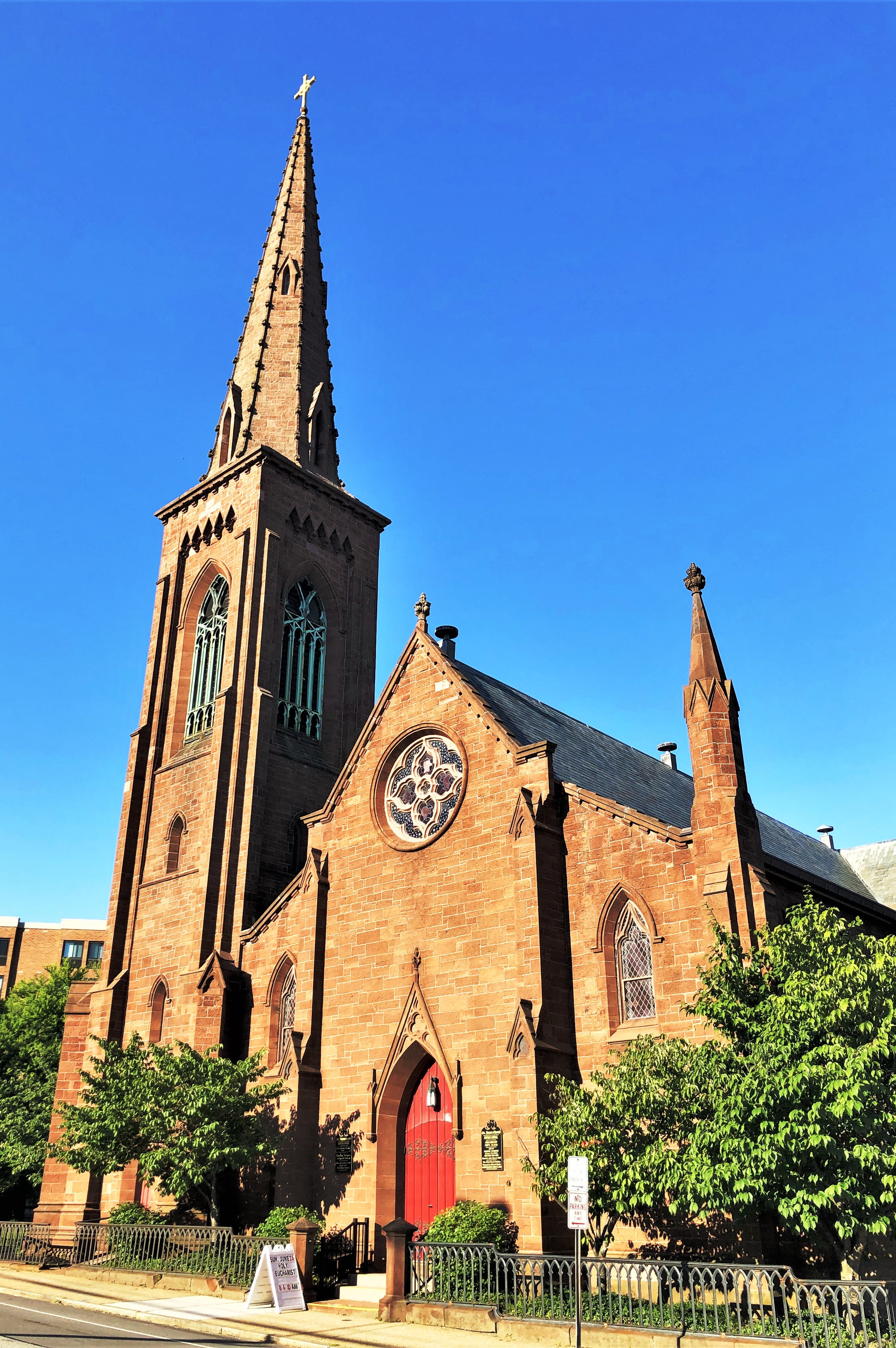
- (2022)

- Location within Connecticut
- 41°21.3′N 72°5.9′W
- Country: United States
- Denomination: Episcopal Church
- Website: St James Church New London

History
- Status: Parish Church
- Founded: June 6, 1725
- Dedication: James, son of Zebedee
- Consecrated: June 11, 1850
- Events: Burned on September 6, 1781 during the Battle of Groton Heights

Architecture
- Heritage designation: National Register of Historic Places
- Designated: July 21, 2004
- Architect: Richard Upjohn
- Style: Gothic Revival
- Groundbreaking: November 3, 1847
- Construction cost: $60,000

Specifications
- Materials: New Jersey Red Sandstone

Administration
- Province: Province 1: New England
- Diocese: Episcopal Diocese of Connecticut
- Deanery: Seabury

Clergy
- Abbot: , Eastern Connecticut Children's Choir.
- Rector: vacant
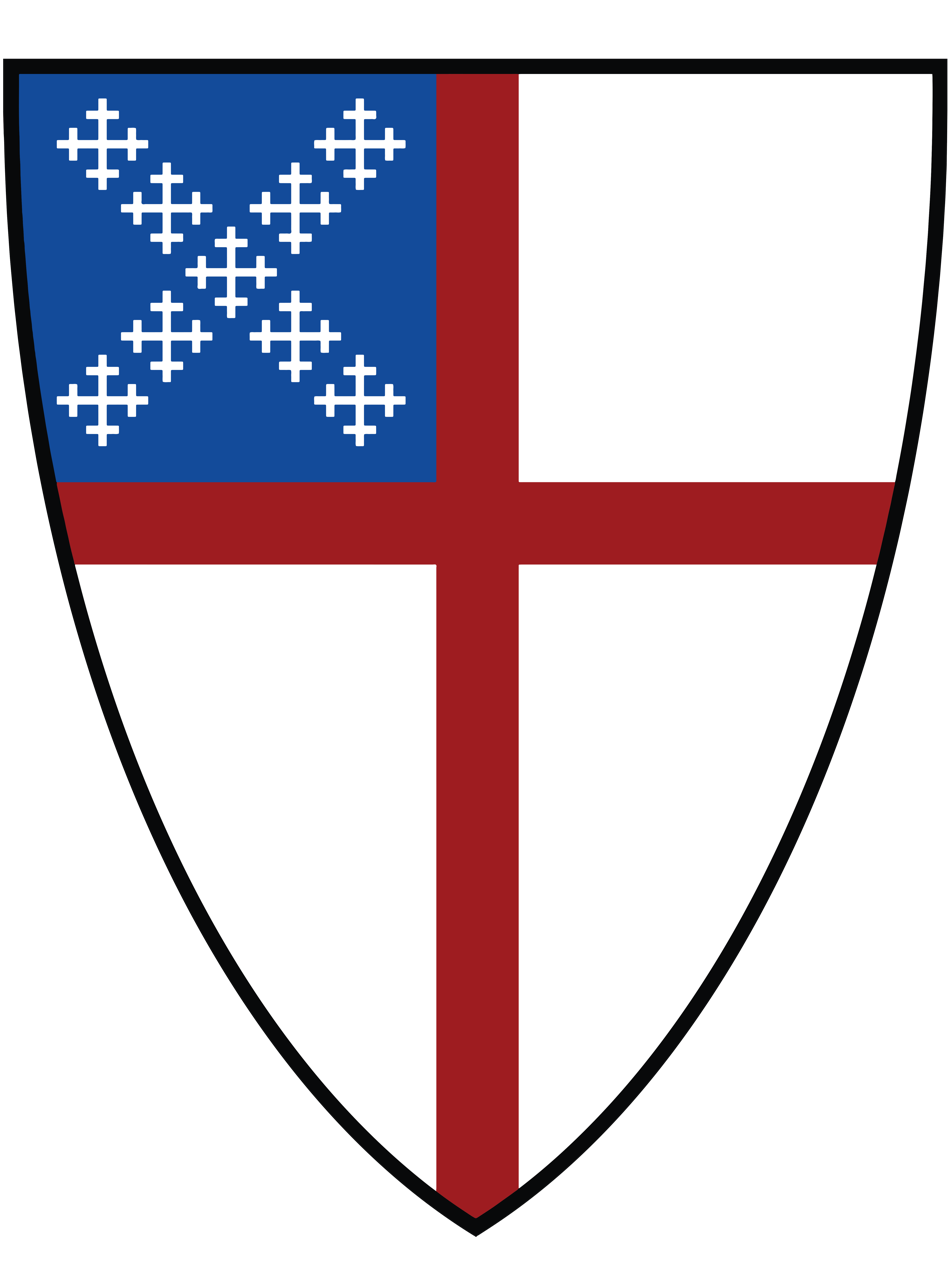

St. James Episcopal Church at 76 Federal Street at the corner of Huntington Street in New London, Connecticut is a historic church in the Episcopal Diocese of Connecticut. The congregation was founded in 1725, and the current church – the congregation's third – was built from 1847 to 1850 to designs in the Gothic Revival style by Richard Upjohn. The church reported 326 members in 2019 and 166 members in 2025. Plate and pledge income reported for the congregation in 2025 was $216,362. Average Sunday attendance (ASA) in 2025 was 77 persons, down from a reported 118 in 2020.

The building was added to the National Register of Historic Places in 2004.

== History and architecture ==
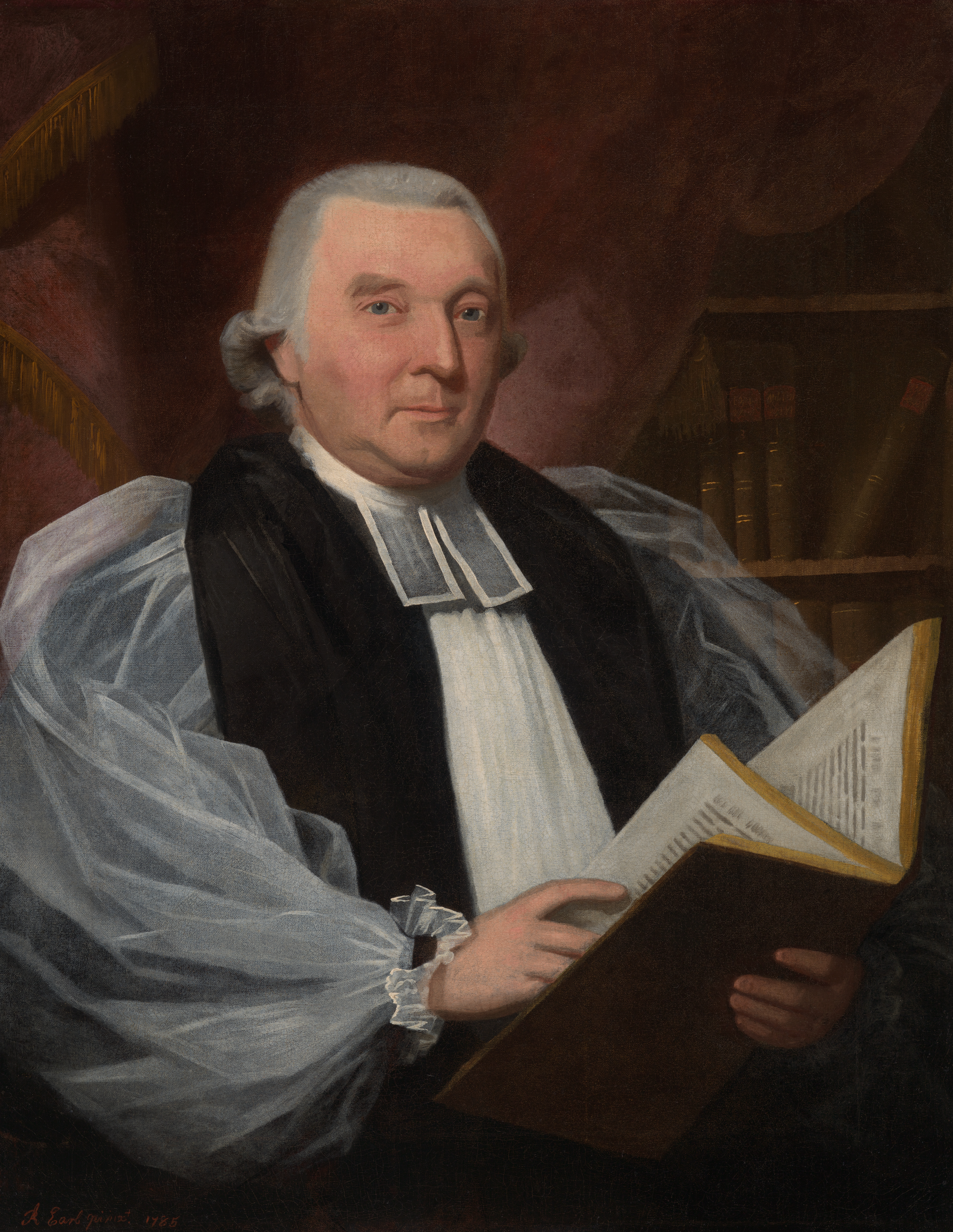
Samuel Seabury, First Bishop of the Episcopal Church and Rector of St. James

=== First church ===
St. James was formed on June 6, 1725, and the first building, a wooden structure located on New London's Parade, was opened in 1732. An arrow was shot into the gilt wooden ball at the top of the steeple by the chief of a visiting Native American delegation. The arrow hung there until the church was destroyed in 1781.

During the American Revolution, a number of the Parish members were loyalists. Services stopped between mid-1775 and the fall of 1778 since tensions were high regarding the use of prayers for the King and Royal Family, and in 1778, the Parish voted "that no person be permitted to...act as a pastor...unless he openly prays for Congress...." The church was destroyed by a fire set in New London on September 6, 1781 during the Battle of Groton Heights. British forces in New London during that engagement were under the command of Brigadier General Benedict Arnold, a native of nearby Norwich.

=== Samuel Seabury ===
After his consecration in Aberdeen on November 14, 1784, as the first bishop of the Episcopal Church (United States), Bishop Samuel Seabury (1729–1796) returned to New London in 1785 as rector of St. James. He died in New London on February 25, 1796, and is now buried in Hallam Chapel located in the undercroft of St. James. A cenotaph designed by architect Richard Upjohn is located on the north side of the sanctuary, and his original grave slab is located outdoors on the north side of the church, now covered by a duplicate.

=== Second church ===
A new church was consecrated on September 20, 1787, near the current site of the Salvation Army building in New London. This was the building that served Bishop Seabury. As the parish began to grow during the mid-1800s, it was clear that a larger building was needed.

=== Third church ===
This building, the congregation's current one, was designed by English-born architect Richard Upjohn in the Gothic Revival style. The cornerstone was laid November 3, 1847, and the church was consecrated on June 11, 1850. It was built in a cruciform style with north and south transepts. There is a very prominent bell tower on the northwest corner. St. James is an excellent example of Upjohn's architectural style. It is notable that St. James was started the year after Upjohn completed Trinity Church (Manhattan). The New York Ecclesiological Society criticized Upjohn for the "moorish" design of the roof bracing in St. James, however, it was well received locally.

=== Rectory ===
The rectory is located on Huntington St. in one of four Greek Revival houses built between 1835 and 1845 known as Whale Oil Row. This row of buildings is unique in Connecticut, and possibly the United States, and documents the lifestyle of their wealthy owners who worked in the whaling industry of that time.

== Stained glass windows ==
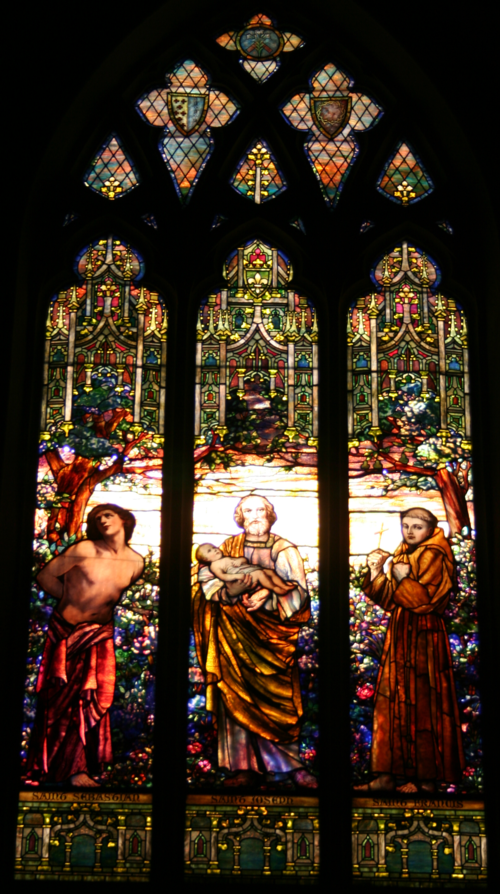
Lawrence Memorial Window by Tiffany Studios, New York

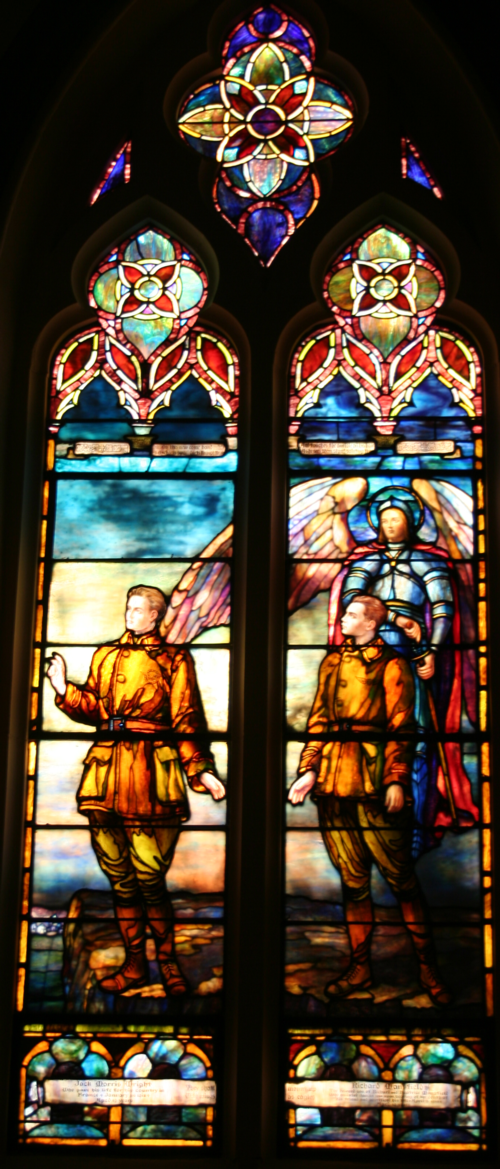
Mansfield Memorial Window by J&R Lamb Studios

=== Henry E. Sharp windows ===
The original stained glass windows (including the Altar window) were installed in 1850 and are believed to have been designed by the Henry E. Sharp Studio in New York. Many of them have been replaced over the years, but several grisaille style windows remain.

=== Louis Comfort Tiffany windows ===
Starting in 1910, six of the original windows were replaced with memorial windows made by Tiffany Studios in New York. The large Tiffany windows in the north and south transepts are magnificent examples of the art form. The south transept window depicts three saints; Sebastian, Joseph (holding the infant Jesus), and Francis. It commemorates three members of the Lawrence family: father Joseph and his two sons, Francis and Sabastian. The north transept window shows the Holy Family and was donated in memory of Lyman Allyn. The wealth that made these and the other Tiffany windows possible was derived largely from the whaling trade.

=== J&R Lamb Studios window ===
The Mansfield Memorial Window was installed in 1922 by J&R Lamb Studios and commemorates two friends who died during World War I. Nineteen-year-old Jack Morris Wright was killed while flying in France January 24, 1918. His friend, Richard Mansfield 2nd, also nineteen, enlisted after hearing of Jack's death, and died in an Army training camp a little over three months later on April 3, 1918. Richard was the son of famed actors Richard and Beatrice Mansfield. The window depicts the Archangel Michael unsheathing his sword behind two aviators. The lower window is inscribed with a quote from Isaiah 40.31: "They shall mount up with wings as eagles."

Jack Morris Wright's letters from France were published by his mother in "Poet of the Air". In Jack's letter to Richard on September 17, 1917, he said: "Therefore, in urging you, I also am warning you; but once in the game, you'll find that usually death serves as a stimulant to the vitality of life and daring of flying."

=== Bishop Seabury window ===
Installed in 1962, this window depicts scenes from the life of the Rt. Rev. Samuel Seabury. The top panel contains seals of the Episcopal Church, the Diocese of Connecticut, and the two Scottish Diocese of Aberdeen, and Moray that provided Seabury's consecrators. Medallions picture Seabury's election at Glebe House in Woodbury, Connecticut; his consecration as bishop by Scottish Bishops Robert Kilgour, John Skinner and Arthur Petrie in Aberdeen, Scotland, his first confirmation, a typical sailing vessel of the time, and the second St. James Church, in which he served as rector.

== Organ ==
The church has an Ernest M. Skinner Organ, Opus 220, made in 1913. It was donated to the Parish by philanthropist and railroad magnate, Commodore Morton Freeman Plant, son of Henry B. Plant, in memory of his wife Nellie. The instrument has 43 ranks of pipes with four divisions and pedals, and contains 2680 pipes. Major tonal changes were made in 1952 and it was reconditioned in 2002. The modern console is mobile and is placed at the center of the choir for organ concerts. Silent film showings featuring live accompaniment on this organ are an annual event at St. James.

== Mission and services ==
Among the services that the St. James congregation provides to the community of New London are a homeless shelter, a free community meal in rotation with other local churches, and The Jumble Shoppe which offers low cost clothing and household goods. In addition, its music program is one of its core ministries. Artists in residence include The Anglican Singers and the Eastern Connecticut Children's Choir.

St. James has a companion parish relationship with St. Margaret's of Scotland, Aberdeen in the Diocese of Aberdeen and Orkney.

== See also ==
- National Register of Historic Places listings in New London County, Connecticut
