= Thayne Jasperson =

American actor, singer, and choreographer (born 1980)

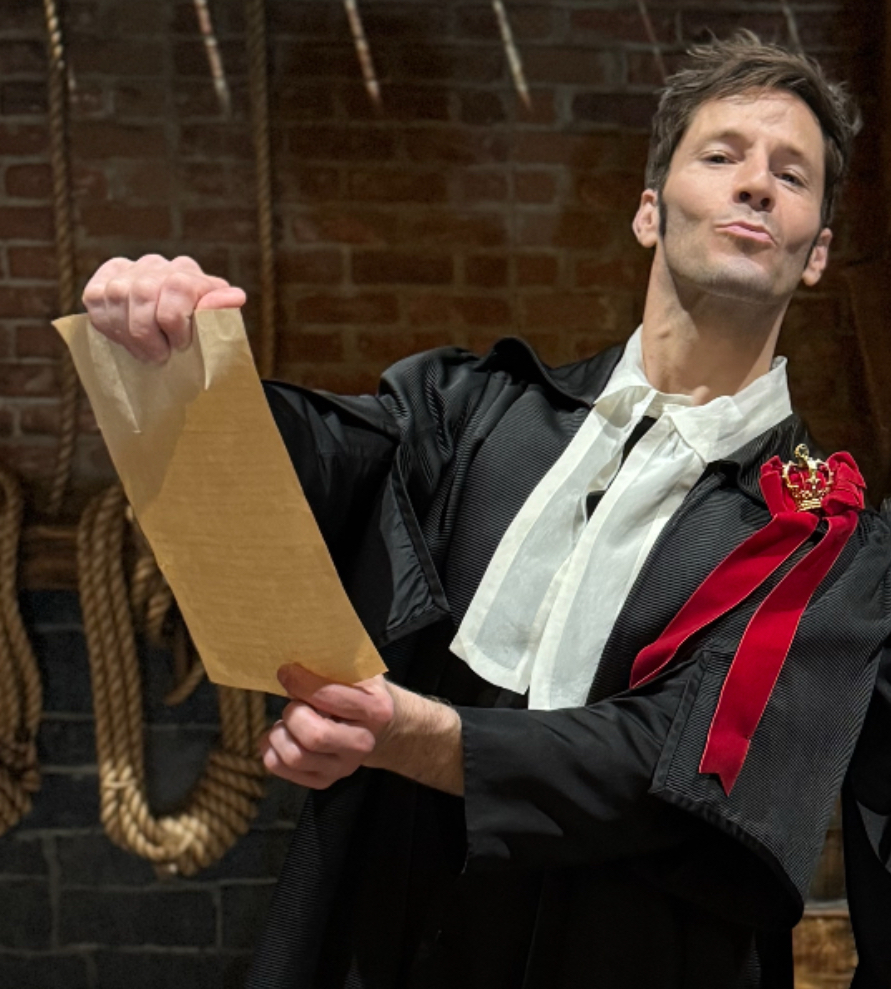
- Jasperson in Seabury costume in 2025.
- Born: July 27, 1980 (age 46); Provo, Utah, U.S.
- Education: Utah Valley State College
- Occupations: Actor; singer
- Years active: 2001–present

Thayne Riley Jasperson (born July 27, 1980) is an American actor, singer, and choreographer, best known for his role in the Broadway musical Hamilton.

== Early life and education ==
Jasperson was born in Provo, Utah before moving to Green River, Wyoming, where he grew up for the first several years of his life. By the age of nine, he had taken up piano, musicals, and clog dancing. When he was younger, he wrote in his journal, "I'm going to be an actor when I grow up." However, his friends mocked him for this, telling him "it was for girls," which led him to temporarily quit his theatre career. Although he wanted to be in an art school when he was younger, he refrained from doing so since he was "fearful of not being cool." He moved to Evanston for a while before moving back to Utah during high school.

Jasperson graduated from Springville High School. When he was 19, Jasperson went on a two-year Mormon mission in Argentina. He later called his time on the mission to be "hard ... but worth it." During his mission, his passion for theatre reignited, and he got back into theatre full-time around July 2001, his 21st birthday. He graduated from Utah Valley University.

== Career ==
=== Film and television ===
Jasperson appeared in the 2006 movie High School Musical as a brainiac dancer. He returned as ensemble for the 2007 sequel, High School Musical 2. In 2008, Jasperson competed in season 4 of the show So You Think You Can Dance, being the fifth male contestant and in gender, the fifth overall contestant eliminated. The same year, he performed in MTV's The American Mall. Jasperson was a dancer in the 2012 Pilot of Smash. He was briefly in the Season 2 finale of Submissions Only as a dancer.

=== Theatre ===
==== 2004–2012: Local and touring shows ====
In 2004, Jasperson performed in 1776 in Hale Center Theatre, playing the role of George Washington's courier. Two years later, in 2006, he performed as Mungojerrie in the Tuacahn Amphitheatre's production of Cats. He returned to Tuacahn as a Swing in Annie. The same year, he played the lead role of Ren in Footloose in 2009. The next year, in 2010, he was in the amphitheater's production of Tarzan as an understudy for both the titular role of Tarzan and for the role of Terk. He was in the First US National Tour of West Side Story from 2010 to 2012. In the tour, Jasperson was a Swing for the ensemble, as well as an understudy for the roles of A-Rab, Baby John, and Big Deal.

==== 2012–2014: Broadway and regional ====
Jasperson made his Broadway debut in 2012 with the roles of Darcy, JoJo, and ensemble in the original cast of Newsies. He performed alongside the rest of the company of Newsies in the 66th Annual Tony Awards. In 2013, he was cast as an ensemble member in the original cast of Matilda on Broadway. Along with his main role as ensemble, Jasperson understudied the roles of the Doctor and Michael Wormwood. He took part in the musical's 2013 Tony Awards Performance, alongside the rest of his fellow cast members. In 2014, he played the dog Porthos in the American Repertory Theatre's production of Finding Neverland.

==== 2014–present: Hamilton on Broadway ====
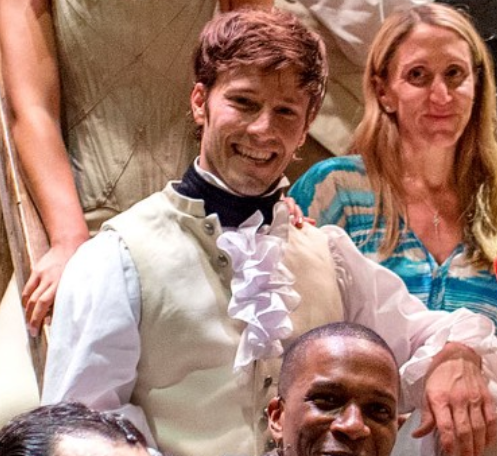
Jasperson in ensemble costume in 2015.

In January 2014, Jasperson participated in the first workshop of the musical Hamilton, written by Lin-Manuel Miranda. From the rest of the workshops to the Off-Broadway and Broadway openings in 2015, he originated the role of Samuel Seabury and performed in the ensemble. Along with being cast as Seabury, he is the understudy for John Laurens / Philip Hamilton and for King George III. In June 2016, Jasperson performed alongside the rest of the Broadway cast in the 70th Tony Awards. The musical received 16 Tony nominations and won 11 awards, setting a record for the most Tony nominations in history, as well as winning second most Tony Awards for a single production in history. In the professional recording of the show, recorded shortly after the Tony Awards, he is seen as the role he originated, Seabury.

Jasperson is the only original cast member still performing the show onstage at Richard Rogers Theatre, having been there for over ten years. He temporarily left the show one time in late 2022 to join the Off-Broadway production of Only Gold. Because he has been in the Richard Rodgers Theatre so long, there was a miniseries called “At Home (The Richard Rodgers)”, (Note: Titled that, as it is a running joke in the Hamilton fandom that he lives there.) featuring Jasperson as the main subject. Episodes were posted on official Hamilton social media accounts. It was originally announced in March 2025, and the series ended around June 2025.

On June 8, 2025, Jasperson performed with the original Broadway cast members of Hamilton at the 78th Annual Tony Awards.

=== Additional projects ===
In the middle of December 2024, Jasperson choreographed a performance for Hamilton's performance at Red Bucket Follies. Shortly after, he provided the lead vocals for the song "Give Santa The Sack" by Utsav Bhargava.

In April 2026, Jasperson hosted the first ever Broadway Ensemble Awards.

== Upcoming projects ==
As of August 2020, Jasperson was writing a show that he planned to choreograph and appear in.

== Educator / movement director ==
Jasperson teaches Hamilton choreography in New York City, where participants can learn a dance combination from the musical. He has also offered online classes for the same purposes, as well as teaching students in a middle school of the town where he grew up.

== Awards and recognitions ==
Year	Award	Category	Work	Result
2012	Tony Awards	Best Musical	Newsies	Nominated
2012	Drama Desk Awards	Outstanding Musical	Newsies	Nominated
2012	Astaire Awards	Outstanding Male Dancer in a Broadway Musical	Newsies	Nominated
2012	Drama League Awards	Distinguished Production of a Musical	Newsies	Nominated
2012	Outer Critics Circle Awards	Outstanding New Broadway Musical	Newsies	Nominated
2013	Grammy Awards	Best Musical Theater Album	Newsies	Nominated
2013	Tony Awards	Best Musical	Matilda	Nominated
2013	Drama League Awards	Outstanding Production of a Broadway or Off-Broadway Musical	Matilda	Nominated
2013	Outer Critics Circle Awards	Outstanding New Broadway Musical	Matilda	Nominated
2013	Drama Desk Awards	Outstanding Musical	Matilda	Won
2013	New York Drama Critics' Circle Award	Best Musical	Matilda	Won
2014	Grammy Awards	Best Musical Theater Album	Matilda	Nominated
2015	Lucille Lortel Awards	Outstanding Musical	Hamilton	Won
2015	Outer Critics Circle Awards	Outstanding New Off-Broadway Musical	Hamilton	Won
2015	Drama League Awards	Outstanding Production of a Broadway or Off-Broadway Musical	Hamilton	Nominated
2015	Drama Desk Awards	Outstanding Musical	Hamilton	Won
2015	New York Drama Critics' Circle Award	Best Musical	Hamilton	Won
2015	Off Broadway Alliance Awards	Best New Musical	Hamilton	Won
2015	Edgerton Foundation	Edgerton Foundation New Play Awards	Hamilton	Won
2016	Tony Awards	Best Musical	Hamilton	Won
2016	Drama League Awards	Outstanding Production of a Broadway or Off-Broadway Musical	Hamilton	Won
2016	Grammy Awards	Best Musical Theater Album	Hamilton	Won
2016	Astaire Awards	Outstanding Ensemble in a Broadway Show	Hamilton	Nominated
2016	NAACP Image Awards	Outstanding Duo, Group, or Collaboration	Hamilton	Nominated
2017	Billboard Music Award	Top Soundtrack/Cast Album	Hamilton	Won

== Personal life ==
Jasperson is a Mormon and a member of the LDS Church. He is bisexual. He currently lives in uptown New York.

He has a close relationship with his family, describing it as "beautiful" when he was able to spend time with them during the COVID-19 pandemic.

== Performance credits ==
=== Theatrical performances ===
==== Broadway ====
Title	Role	Details	Notes
Newsies	Darcy and Ensemble (2012)	Nederlander Theatre	Actor
Matilda	Ensemble (2013–2014)	Tim Minchin, Shubert Theatre	Actor
Hamilton	Samuel Seabury and Ensemble; John Laurens / Philip Hamilton (u/s); King George III (u/s)	Richard Rodgers Theatre, Thomas Kail, Andy Blankenbuehler	Actor, Choreographer

==== Off-Broadway ====
Title	Role	Details	Notes
Only Gold	Ensemble	New York City Center, John Rando	Actor
Hamilton	Samuel Seabury / Ensemble	Public Theatre, Thomas Kail	Actor

==== Regional ====
Title	Role	Details	Notes
Finding Neverland	Porthos	A.R.T	Actor
West Side Story	Ensemble		Actor

=== Film ===
Title	Role	Details	Notes
Hamilton	Samuel Seabury / Ensemble	Directed by Thomas Kail	Actor
High School Musical	Brainiac Dancer	Directed by Kenny Ortega	Actor
High School Musical 2	East High Dancer	Directed by Kenny Ortega	Actor

=== Television ===
Title	Role	Details	Notes
The American Mall	Principal Dancer	Shawn Ku	Actor, Choreographer
So You Think You Can Dance	Self	Matthew Diamond, Bruce Gowers, Nigel Lythgoe	Contestant
Smash	Dancer	Michael Mayer	Dancer
