= Traditional Protestant Episcopal Church =

Continuing Anglican denomination in the Reformed tradition

- Abbreviation: TPEC
- Classification: Continuing Anglican
- Orientation: Reformed Anglican
- Polity: Episcopal
- Separated from: Anglican Catholic Church (1991)
- Separations: Reformed Anglican Church (2009)
- Merged into: Anglican Orthodox Church (2011)

The Traditional Protestant Episcopal Church (TPEC) was a jurisdiction of the Continuing Anglican movement in the Reformed Anglican tradition. It was founded in 1991 by Richard G. Melli, formerly a priest of the Anglican Catholic Church, Diocese of the South. This Christian church body saw itself as maintaining the original doctrine, discipline, and worship of the Protestant Episcopal Church in the United States of America and the evangelical, Protestant, and Reformed faith of historic Anglicanism.

The TPEC, which had one diocese that was named Diocese of the Advent, subscribed to the authority of Holy Scripture and the Thirty-nine Articles of Religion. The 1928 Book of Common Prayer was used and assent was given to the 1954 revision of the Constitution and Canons of the PECUSA. At its inception, the church consisted of twelve congregations, primarily low church "Morning Prayer" parishes, and as many clergy.

In September 2011, TPEC's Presiding Bishop, Charles E. Morley, and Canterbury Chapel in Fairhope, Alabama, were received by Presiding Bishop Jerry L. Ogles into the Anglican Orthodox Church.
