= Remarks on the Quebec Bill =

Remarks on the Quebec Bill is an essay written by Alexander Hamilton in 1775, criticizing the British Parliament's passage of the Quebec Act of 1774. This work reflects Hamilton’s early political philosophy and his concerns regarding British policies in North America.

== Background ==
The Quebec Act of 1774 was a law enacted by the British Parliament that expanded the territory of Quebec and granted religious freedom to French Catholics. While it was intended to secure the loyalty of French Canadians, it was widely opposed by American colonists, who saw it as a threat to their own liberties and territorial claims. The act was one of the so-called Intolerable Acts, which fueled colonial resentment against British rule and contributed to the outbreak of the American Revolutionary War.

Alexander Hamilton wrote Remarks on the Quebec Bill as a critique of the British government’s policies. The essay was part of the broader colonial resistance against British authority, expressing fears that the act set a dangerous precedent for governance in British America.

== Summary ==
In Remarks on the Quebec Bill, Hamilton argues that the Quebec Act undermines fundamental English liberties and establishes a dangerous model of government that could be imposed on the American colonies. His key arguments include:

Criticism of Arbitrary Rule: Hamilton viewed the act as an imposition of arbitrary power, as it lacked representative government and concentrated authority in the hands of British-appointed officials.

Religious Concerns: While Hamilton did not oppose religious tolerance outright, he feared that the British government’s concessions to Catholicism in Quebec could undermine Protestant political influence in North America.

Threat to Colonial Rights: He warned that the act could serve as a precedent for imposing similar restrictive governance on the American colonies, diminishing self-rule and legal protections.

Geopolitical Ramifications: Hamilton also criticized the territorial expansion of Quebec, which limited the westward expansion of the American colonies and placed more land under direct British control.

== Significance ==
Hamilton’s Remarks on the Quebec Bill demonstrated his early commitment to constitutional government and opposition to centralized authoritarian rule. His concerns about arbitrary governance and the erosion of colonial rights aligned with broader revolutionary sentiments of the time. While the essay did not gain the same prominence as some of his later writings, it contributed to his reputation as a political thinker and advocate for colonial resistance.

The Quebec Act remained a source of tension leading up to the American Revolution, reinforcing colonial fears that the British government intended to rule North America through coercion rather than consent.

== Legacy ==
Although Remarks on the Quebec Bill is not as well-known as Hamilton’s later works, it provides insight into his evolving political ideology. His arguments against arbitrary power and for representative government foreshadowed the principles he would later champion in The Federalist Papers and as a key architect of the U.S. Constitution.

== See also ==
- Bibliography of Alexander Hamilton
