= Reformed Anglican Church =

Continuing Anglican denomination in the Reformed tradition

- Abbreviation: RAC
- Classification: Continuing Anglican
- Orientation: Reformed Anglican
- Polity: Episcopal
- Presiding Bishop: Delbert Murray
- Separated from: Traditional Protestant Episcopal Church
- Official website: reformedanglican.us

The Reformed Anglican Church (formerly named the Protestant Episcopal Church, USA) is a Continuing Anglican denomination of the Reformed Anglican tradition. It has an episcopal polity and is based in the United States. It was founded as a split in 2009 from the Traditional Protestant Episcopal Church, another Continuing Anglican body. The church is strongly confessional, Reformed and evangelical. It uses the 1928 Book of Common Prayer.

The current bishop is the Rt. Rev. Robert S. Biermann.

== History ==
The Reformed Anglican Church is a Continuing Anglican denomination that was created in 2009 as a result of a schism with the Traditional Protestant Episcopal Church, another Continuing Anglican denomination with origins in the Anglican Catholic Church that merged into the Anglican Orthodox Church in 2011. As with its parent denomination, the Reformed Anglican Church aims at upholding the Reformed Anglican tradition.

== Theology ==
=== Creeds ===
- Athanasian Creed
- Nicene Creed
- Apostles Creed

=== Catechisms ===
- Nowell's Catechism
- Heidelberg Catechism
- Anglican Catechism
- 39 Articles of Faith

=== Solas ===
- Sola Scriptura
- Solus Christus
- Sola Gratia
- Sola Fide
- Soli Deo Gloria
