= Samuel Seabury =

American Episcopal Bishop (1729–1796)

The Most Reverend Samuel Seabury
- 2nd Presiding Bishop of the Episcopal Church
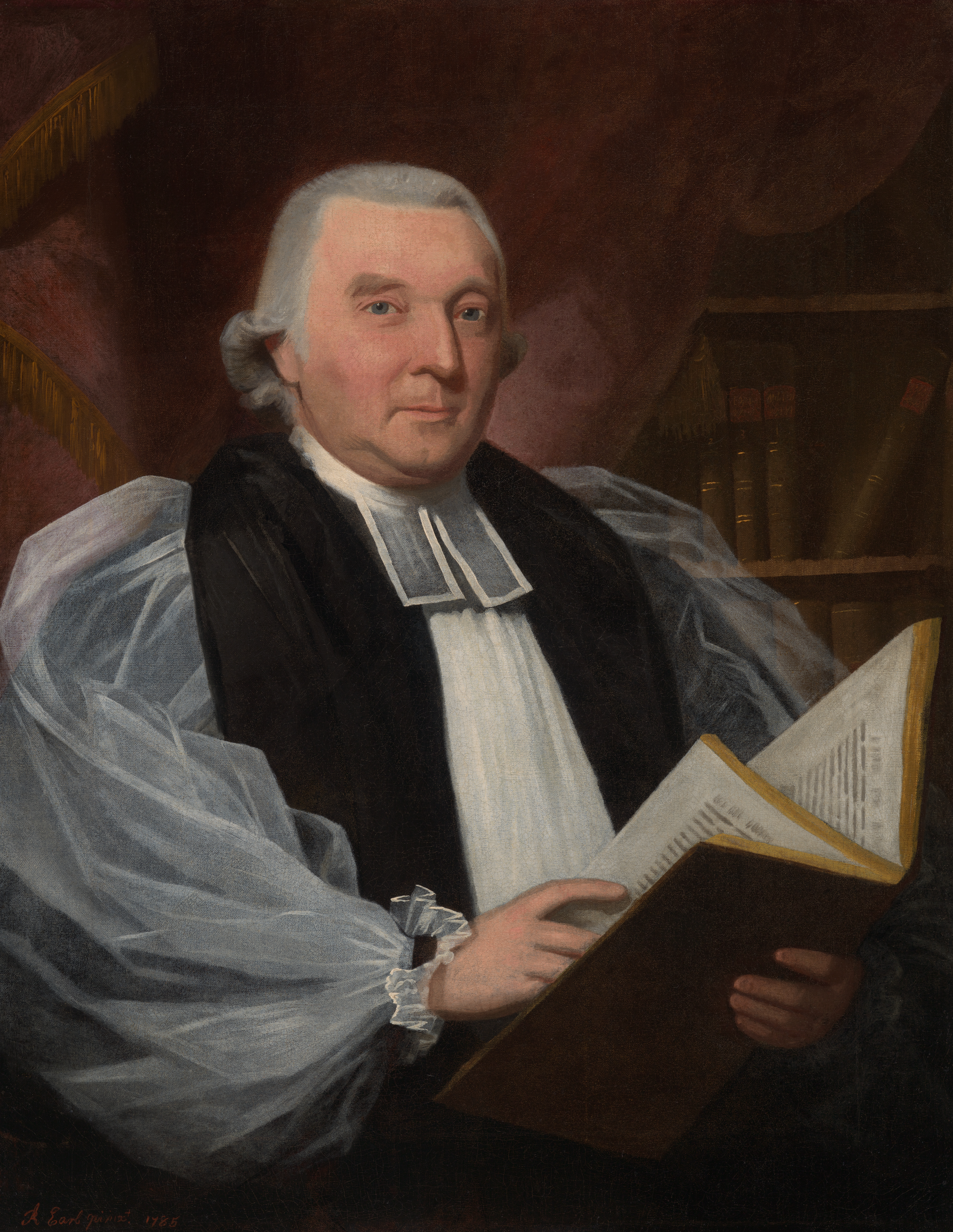
- Portrait by Ralph Earl, c. 1785
- Church: Episcopal Church
- In office: 1789–1792
- Predecessor: William White
- Successor: Samuel Provoost
- Other posts: Bishop of Connecticut (1784–1796); Bishop of Rhode Island (1790–1796)

Orders
- Ordination: December 23, 1753 by Richard Osbaldeston
- Consecration: November 14, 1784 by Robert Kilgour

Personal details
- Born: November 30, 1729 North Groton, Connecticut, British America
- Died: February 25, 1796 (aged 66) New London, Connecticut, U.S.
- Buried: St. James Episcopal Church (New London, Connecticut)
- Denomination: Anglican
- Parents: Samuel Seabury & Abigail Mumford
- Spouse: Mary Hicks
- Children: 5
- Education: Yale College; University of Edinburgh

Sainthood
- Feast day: November 14
- Venerated in: Church of England Episcopal Church Anglican Church in North America

Ordination history of Samuel Seabury
History
Diaconal ordination
- Ordained by: John Thomas, (Lincoln)
- Date: 21 December 1753
- Place: Fulham Palace
Priestly ordination
- Ordained by: Richard Osbaldeston, (Carlisle)
- Date: 23 December 1753
- Place: Fulham Palace
Episcopal consecration
- Principal consecrator: Robert Kilgour, (Aberdeen)
- Co-consecrators: Arthur Petrie (Moray, Ross and Caithness); John Skinner (Aberdeen)
- Date: 14 November 1784
- Place: Bishop John Skinner's house, Longacre, Aberdeen

Samuel Seabury (November 30, 1729 – February 25, 1796) was the first American Episcopal bishop, the second Presiding Bishop of the Episcopal Church in the United States of America, and the first Bishop of Connecticut. He was a leading Loyalist in the Province of New York and Connecticut Colony at the time of the American Revolution and a known rival of Alexander Hamilton.

== Early life and education ==
He was born in North Groton (since renamed Ledyard), Connecticut, in 1729 in a home that still stands as a Historic Landmark on the corner of Church Hill Road and Spicer Hill Road in Ledyard, Connecticut. His father, also Samuel Seabury (1706–1764), was originally a Congregationalist minister in Groton but was ordained deacon and priest in the Church of England in 1730. Seabury, the father, was a rector in New London, Connecticut, from 1732 to 1743, and of St George's, Hempstead, New York on Long Island from 1743 until his death. Samuel Seabury, the father, claimed as property a slave named Newport, who is documented in his will.

Samuel Seabury, his son, graduated from Yale College in 1748, and studied theology with his father. He studied medicine in Edinburgh Medical School from 1752 to 1753 and was ordained deacon by John Thomas, Bishop of Lincoln, and priest by Richard Osbaldeston, Bishop of Carlisle, on December 21 and 23 respectively, 1753. Seabury was rector of Christ Church, New Brunswick, New Jersey, from 1754 to 1757, rector in Jamaica, New York, from 1757 to 1766, and of St. Peter's, Westchester (now the Westchester Square neighborhood of The Bronx) from 1766 to 1775.

== Seabury and slavery ==
Samuel Seabury grew up in an economy based on slavery, and in a slaveholding family. His father legally owned at least one slave, Newport, who is marked in his will. Samuel Seabury became a slaveholder when he married Mary Hicks on October 12, 1756. Seabury's father-in-law, Edward Hicks, gifted his daughter with an enslaved woman. Edward Hicks promised the Seaburys a certain level of financial assistance and his failure to do so soon became part of a legal dispute. As part of the ongoing dispute in the 1760s, Hicks transferred the ownership of four slaves to Samuel Seabury. Hicks and the four enslaved people later moved into the Seabury home. After Hicks died, Seabury transferred three of the slaves back to the Hicks estate. Seabury continued to legally own one slave, Charles, as his property.

According to the 1790 census, the Seabury household in New London had three slaves. After the Bishop died, a probate inventory of his estate listed a 38-year-old woman, Nell, and a 9-year-old girl, Rose. Seabury's journal notes that Nell worked in the parsonage house at St. James's Episcopal Church in New London, where he and his daughter Maria lived.

== American Revolution and dispute with Alexander Hamilton ==
Seabury was one of the signatories of the White Plains Protest of April 1775 against all unlawful congresses and committees and, in many other ways, he proved himself a devoted Loyalist. He wrote "Free Thoughts on the Proceedings of the Continental Congress" (1774) under the pen name A. W. Farmer (standing for "a Westchester farmer"), which was followed by "The Congress Canvassed" (1774). Alexander Hamilton responded to these open letters in "A Full Vindication of the Measures of Congress, from the Calumnies of their Enemies". Seabury wrote a third "Farmer's Letter" entitled "A View of the Controversy between Great Britain and her Colonies" to answer Hamilton, and Hamilton completed the exchange by writing "The Farmer Refuted" (1775).

The three "Farmer's Letters" are forceful presentations of the Loyalist claim, written in a plain, hard-headed style. Their authorship was long in question, but it is certain that Seabury claimed them in England in 1783, when he was seeking episcopal consecration. At the same time, he claimed authorship of a letter entitled "An Alarm to the Legislature of the Province of New York" (1775), not signed by the Westchester farmer, which discussed the power of what he viewed as the only legal political body in the colony. Seabury's clarity of style and general ease of reading set him apart from his ecclesiastical colleagues throughout his life.

The pieces Seabury wrote under the pen name A.W. Farmer in the Letters to a Westchester Farmer display not only Seabury’s Loyalism, but a particular view of social hierarchy and slavery. In “A View of the Controversy,” Seabury wrote that “liberty is a very good thing, and slavery a very bad thing” and later notes that “abject slavery” equated in some way with “cruel oppression.” In his Revolutionary writings, he indicated that slavery was a state that individuals, namely white Loyalists, must avoid. In this Seabury aligned with his rebel American counterparts, such as Thomas Jefferson and George Washington, though he was on the opposite side of the conflict.

Seabury was arrested in November 1775 by local Patriots and was kept in prison in Connecticut for six weeks. He was prevented from carrying out his ministry; after some time in Long Island, he took refuge in New York City where he was appointed chaplain to the King's American Regiment in 1778. At the end of the war, he moved to Connecticut and was loyal to the new government.

== Ecclesial career ==
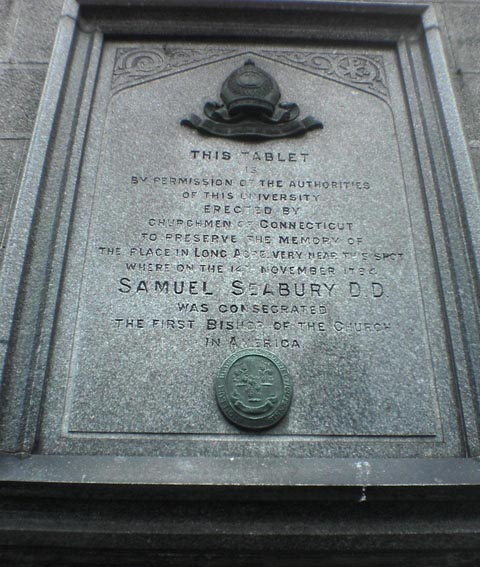
Tablet marking Seabury's consecration at Marischal College, Aberdeen

On March 25, 1783, a meeting of ten Episcopal clergy at the Glebe House in Woodbury, Connecticut, elected Seabury bishop as their second choice (a favorite son was elected first but declined for health reasons). There were no Anglican bishops in America to consecrate him and so he sailed to London on July 7. In England, however, his consecration was considered to be impossible because, as an American citizen, he could no longer take the oath of allegiance to the King. He then turned to the Scottish Episcopal Church, although he had also approached the surviving non-juring bishops in England, William Cartwright of Shrewsbury and Kenrick Price of Manchester. The Episcopalians in Scotland were and are not the established church; they were a legally recognized but oppressed church which refused to recognize the Hanoverian kings. Earlier scandal had been caused by the presence of two non-juring bishops in America in the 1720s (John Talbot and Robert Welton) (Note: Talbot was the rector of St. Mary's Episcopal Church, Burlington, New Jersey) who were removed from their positions after being accused of schism in the Church of England in America.

Seabury was consecrated in Aberdeen on November 14, 1784, on the condition that he study the Scottish rite of Holy Communion and work for its adoption, rather than that of the 1662 English prayer book. To the present day, the American liturgy adheres to the main features of this rite in one of its Holy Eucharist Liturgies. Seabury was consecrated bishop by Robert Kilgour, Bishop of Aberdeen and Primus of Scotland; Arthur Petrie, Bishop of Ross and Moray; and John Skinner, coadjutor bishop of Aberdeen. The consecration took place in Skinner's house in Longacre, approximately 500 metres from the present St Andrew's Cathedral, Aberdeen. The chair on which Kilgour sat to perform the consecration is preserved in Holy Trinity Episcopal Church, Keith, Moray. The anniversary of his consecration is now a lesser feast day on the calendars of the Episcopal Church (United States) and the Anglican Church of Canada and other churches of the Anglican Communion.

Seabury's consecration by the non-juring Scots caused alarm in the British government who feared an entirely Jacobite church in the United States, and Parliament was persuaded to make provision for the ordination of foreign bishops. Seabury's tenacity in the matter had the effect of making possible a continued relationship between the American and English churches. The problem was revealed not to be one of liturgical restrictions (the oath) but of political plans.

Seabury returned to Connecticut in 1785 and made New London his home, becoming rector of St James Church there. A meeting of his Connecticut clergy was held during the first week of August 1785 at Christ Church on the South Green in Middletown. On August 3, the first Anglican ordinations on American soil took place at Christ Church in Middletown, and Henry Van Dyke, Philo Shelton, Ashbel Baldwin, and Colin Ferguson were ordained to the Holy Order of Deacons that day, with Ferguson being ordained priest on the 7th. Seabury said of Christ Church, Middletown, "Long may this birthplace be remembered, and may the number of faithful stewards who follow this succession increase and multiply till time shall be no more."

In 1790, Seabury also took charge of the Diocese of Rhode Island. In 1792, he joined with Bishops William White, Samuel Provoost, and James Madison who had all received English consecration, thus uniting the Scottish and the English apostolic successions.

=== Contribution to liturgy ===
Coat of Arms of Samuel Seabury

Seabury played a decisive role in the evolution of Anglican liturgy in North America after the Revolution. His "Communion Office," published in New London in 1786, was based on the Scottish Liturgy of 1764 rather than the 1662 Book of Common Prayer in use in the Church of England. Seabury's defense of the Scottish service—especially its restoration of oblationary language and the epiklesis or invocation of the Holy Spirit in the Prayer of Consecration was adopted into the Book of Common Prayer with minor change by the Episcopal Church in 1789. The English 1552, 1559, 1604 and 1662 Books of Common Prayers of Consecration ended with the Words of Institution; but the Scottish Rite Prayer continued with an oblation, anamnesis, epiclesis, intercessions and doxology based on the ancient classical models of consecration prayers. The Prayer was a mix of Roman and Orthodox doctrines with some Calvinist elements. The English Rites focused on the memorial to the exclusion of sacrificial language in the Prayer of Consecration. Such sacrificial language as remained was placed at the end of the service in an optional Prayer of Oblation at which point the congregation made a self-offering beseeching God "to accept our sacrifice of praise and thanksgiving." The removal of oblation from the prayer of consecration was done in order to avoid the suggestion that the Holy Eucharist was a material Peace Offering to God made by his Church in and with Christ with the very same sacrifice he had offered once for all and now made present as a sacrament. The restoration of the full Eucharistic Prayer taken from the Scottish Rite included the words, "which we now offer unto thee," after "with these thy holy gifts." The prayer continued after the oblationary words with, "the memorial thy Son hath commanded us to make," in the American Prayer Book, thereby restoring the connection between "prayers and supplications" and the self-offering of the congregation with and through the consecrated elements. The changes undid Cranmer's intentions of 1549 and 1552. The adoption of the Scottish Rite brought the Episcopal Church's eucharistic doctrine closer to the tradition of the Catholic and Orthodox Churches. The adoption of the Scottish Prayer of Consecration restored to the liturgy of the new Church the ancient doctrine from the mid-second century that the eucharist is the Church's sacrifice.

Seabury also argued for the restoration of another ancient custom, the weekly celebration of Holy Communion on Sunday rather than the infrequent observance that became customary in most Protestant churches after the Reformation. In "An Earnest Persuasive to Frequent Communion", published in 1789 in New Haven, he wrote that "when I consider its importance, both on account of the positive command of Christ, and of the many and great benefits we receive from it, I cannot but regret that it does not make a part of every Sunday's solemnity." Seabury was ahead of his time, but within a century the custom of weekly 8 am Eucharist even in 'Low Church' parishes (in addition to the monthly 1st Sunday of the month Holy Communion) was rapidly spreading through many Anglican congregations under the impact of the Liturgical Movement. By the end of the 20th century, many other Protestant denominations had adopted weekly communion if this had not already been their practice (as with the Disciples of Christ).

=== Later life ===
In Cheshire in 1794, he established the Episcopal Academy of Connecticut, which later became Cheshire Academy.

He died in New London on 25 February 1796, where his remains lie in a small chapel at St. James. The church also features a stained glass window depicting his consecration in Scotland. Seabury's portrait by Ralph Earl is in the collection of the National Portrait Gallery in Washington, D.C. A notable portrait hangs at the General Theological Seminary, and a smaller painting is to be found at the College of Preachers on the grounds of the Washington National Cathedral.

Seabury was a superior organizer and a strict churchman. Seabury's "Farmer's Letters" rank him as the most vigorous American loyalist controversialist and, along with his prayers and devotional writings, one of the greatest masters of style of his period. His printed sermons and essays enjoyed wide readership well after his death.

=== Consecrators ===
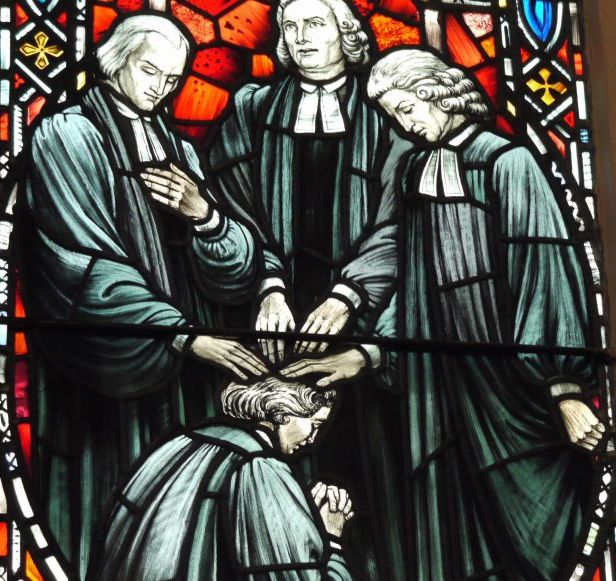
The consecration of Seabury depicted in stained glass at All Saints Church, Jordanhill, Glasgow

- Robert Kilgour, 39th Bishop of Aberdeen
- Arthur Petrie, 37th Bishop of Moray, Ross and Caithness
- John Skinner, coadjutor Bishop of Aberdeen

Samuel Seabury was the first bishop consecrated for the Episcopal Church (United States).

== Family ==
His brother David Seabury was a Loyalist who moved to Nova Scotia. He returned to the United States in 1806.

Seabury married Mary Hicks in 1756. His father-in-law Edward Hicks provided financial assistance to Seabury.

His son Charles (1770–1844) was rector in various Long Island churches.

A nephew, Seabury Tredwell, was the owner of the Old Merchant's House in Manhattan, now a museum.

A grandson, Samuel Seabury (1801–1872) was an American Episcopal clergyman, as was that Seabury's son, William Jones Seabury.

== Veneration ==
On September 12, 1849, the relics of Samuel Seabury were translated to the Church of St. James the Great in New London, Connecticut, and buried under the chancel. The service was conducted like any other funeral from the Prayerbook, but with particular solemnity. Wisdom 5:1–17 was read along with the Psalm Exurgat Deus as a Thanksgiving. After the recitation of the Nicene Creed, the Rev. Dr. Jarvis gave the benediction. The Colonial Church Chronicle and Missionary Journal wrote about the service: "The venerable relics consisted of the entire skeleton of the departed Prelate, from which every other portion of the body had disappeared. The bones were in a good state of preservation; the head was uncommonly large, and not without some distinguishing characteristics, resembling those of the portraits. The sight of such a sacred memorial deeply affected the little circle of spectators who beheld in silence, and with heads instinctively uncovered. A company of brethren in the Priesthood were standing together over the dust of him to whom they felt in common the obligations of children, and the deeper reverence of spiritual sons for a patriarch of the Church, and a sore-tried confessor of the truth of God." The Seabury Society gives September 12 as an additional day of commemoration: The Translation of Samuel Seabury's Relics.

Seabury is celebrated with a commemoration in the Church of England on November 14, and his consecration is honored with a feast in the Episcopal Church (USA) and the Anglican Church in North America on the same date. The observance is also found in other Anglican churches including the Anglican Church of Canada Book of Alternative Services and the Scottish Episcopal Church Revised Scottish Calendar, 1991. The Rt. Rev. Arthur Cleveland Coxe, the Bishop of Western New York, composed a poem –Seabury's Mitre– for his commemoration. This poem has since been set to music by the Seabury Society to be sung as an anthem on Seabury's Feast Day.

There have been several Anglican Devotional Societies which have borne Bishop Seabury's name committed to his veneration, the earliest dating to 1844 and the most recent being reestablished in 2019 by members of the Anglican Church in North America.

== Honors ==
Seabury Hall, at Trinity College in Hartford, Connecticut, is named after Samuel Seabury. An Episcopal seminary, Seabury-Western Theological Seminary, memorializes his honored position in the church. Bishop Seabury Academy in Lawrence, Kansas, and Seabury Hall in Makawao, Hawaii, are private schools, affiliated with the Episcopal Church, that also honor Seabury in the naming of their schools. Bishop Seabury Anglican Church – founded in 1875 in the Episcopal Diocese of Connecticut and now a member of the Anglican Church in North America – is likewise named in Seabury's memory.

== Publications ==
- Letters of a Westchester Farmer (1774–75)
- The Communion-Office, or Order for the Administration of the Holy Eucharist or Supper of the Lord with Private Devotions (1786)
- An Earnest Persuasive to Frequent Communion (1789)
- Hamilton's View of the Controversy between Great Britain and her Colonies as "A. W. Farmer"
- The Errors of Calvinism n.p. 1766 ST2
- A View of the Controversy between Great-Britain and Her Colonies. New York 1774
- Free Thoughts on the Proceedings of the Continental Congress New York 1774
- The Congress Canvassed. New York 1774
- An Alarm to the Legislature of the Province of New-York, Occasioned by the Present Political Disturbances. New York 1775
- A Discourse on Brotherly Love, Preached before the Honorable Fraternity of Free and Accepted Masons, of Zion Lodge, at St. Paul’s Chapel, in New York, on the Festival of St. John the Baptist, One Thousand Seven Hundred and Seventy-Seven. New York 1777 SUI
- A Discourse on II Tim. III. 16. Delivered in St. Paul’s and St. George’s Chapels, in New-York, on Sunday the 11th of May, 1777. New York 1777 SUI
- St. Peter’s Exhortation to Fear God and Honor the King, Explained and Inculcated: in a Discourse Addressed to His Majesty’s Provincial Troops, in Camp at King’s Bridge, on Sunday the 28th Sept. 1777. New York 1777 Attributed although doubtful. SUI
- A Sermon Preached before the Grand Lodge, and the Other Lodges of Ancient Freemasons, in New-York, at St. Paul’s Chapel, on the Anniversary of St. John the Evangelist, 1782. New York 1783 SUI
- Samuel, by Divine Permission, Bishop of the Episcopal Church in the State of Connecticut [injunction regarding political prayers] n.p. 1785 Broad-side SUI, ST2
- Bishop Seabury’s Second Charge, to the Clergy of His Diocess [sic], Delivered at Derby, in the State of Connecticut, on the 22d of September, 1786. New Haven 1786 SUI
- Forms of prayer for the United States in Congress Assembled 1786 Only a fragment survives
- The Address of the Episcopal Clergy of Connecticut, to the Right Reverend Bishop Seabury, with the Bishop’s Answer and, a Sermon, Before the Convention at Middletown, August 3d, 1785...Also Bishop Seabury’s first Charge, to the Clergy of his Diocess [sic], Delivered at Middletown, August 4, 1785. With a List of the Succession of Scot’s Bishops, from the Revolution 1688, to the present Time. New Haven 1786 The Charge is paginated separately.
- The Communion-Office, or Order for the Administration of the Holy Eucharist or Supper of the Lord. With Private Devotions. Recommended to the Episcopal Congregations in Connecticut. New London 1786
- A Sermon Delivered before the Boston Episcopal Charitable Society in Trinity Church; at Their Anniversary Meeting on Easter Tuesday March 25, 1788. Boston 1788 SUI
- A Sermon Preached in Christ Church, Philadelphia, Before the Corporation for the Relief of the Widows and Children of Clergymen at their Anniversary Meeting, October 7, 1789. Philadelphia 1789 SUI
- An Earnest Persuasive to Frequent Communion; Addressed to Those Professors of the Church of England, in Connecticut, Who Neglect That Holy Ordinance. New Haven 1789 SUI
- The Duty of Considering our Ways. A Sermon Preached in Saint James Church, New-London, on Ashwednesday, 1789. New London 1789
- An Address to the Ministers and Congregations of the Presbyterian and Independent Persuasions in the United States of America, by a Member of the Episcopal Church New Haven 1790 SUI
- A Discourse, Delivered in St. John’s Church, in Portsmouth, New Hampshire, at the Conferring the Order of Priesthood on the Rev. Robert Fowle, A.M. of Holderness, on the Festival of St. Peter, 1791. SUI
- A Discourse Delivered before the Triennial Convention of the Protestant Episcopal Church at Trinity Church, New York, on the Twelfth Day of September, One Thousand Seven Hundred and Ninety-Two. New York 1792 SUI
- Discourses on Several Subjects. New York 1793
- Samuel, by Divine Permission, Bishop of Connecticut and Rhode Island [regarding the deposition of James Sayre] n.p. 1793 Broad-side SUI
- A Discourse Delivered in St. James’ Church, in New-London, on Tuesday the 23d of December, 1794, Before an Assembly of Free and Accepted Masons, Convened for the Purpose of Installing a Lodge in that City New London 1794
- A Burial Office for Infants Who Depart this Life before they have Polluted their Baptism by Actual Sin n.p. 1795 SUI
- A Discourse Delivered Before an Assembly of Free and Accepted Masons, Convened for the Purpose of Installing a Lodge in the City of Norwich, in Connecticut, on the Festival of St. John the Baptist, 1795. Norwich
- Samuel, By Divine Permission, Bishop of Connecticut and Rhode-Island... [charitable fund] New London 1795 SUI
- Samuel, By Divine Permission, Bishop of Connecticut and Rhode-Island...[Algerian Captives] New London 1795 ST2
- The Psalter or Psalms of David, Pointed as They are to be Sung or Said in Churches. With the Order for Morning and Evening Prayer Daily Throughout the Year. [Also containing the Athanasian Creed, the Litany, Prayers for special occasions, Thanksgivings, and a Catechism] New London 1795
- Discourses on Several Important Subjects. New York 1798

== In popular culture ==
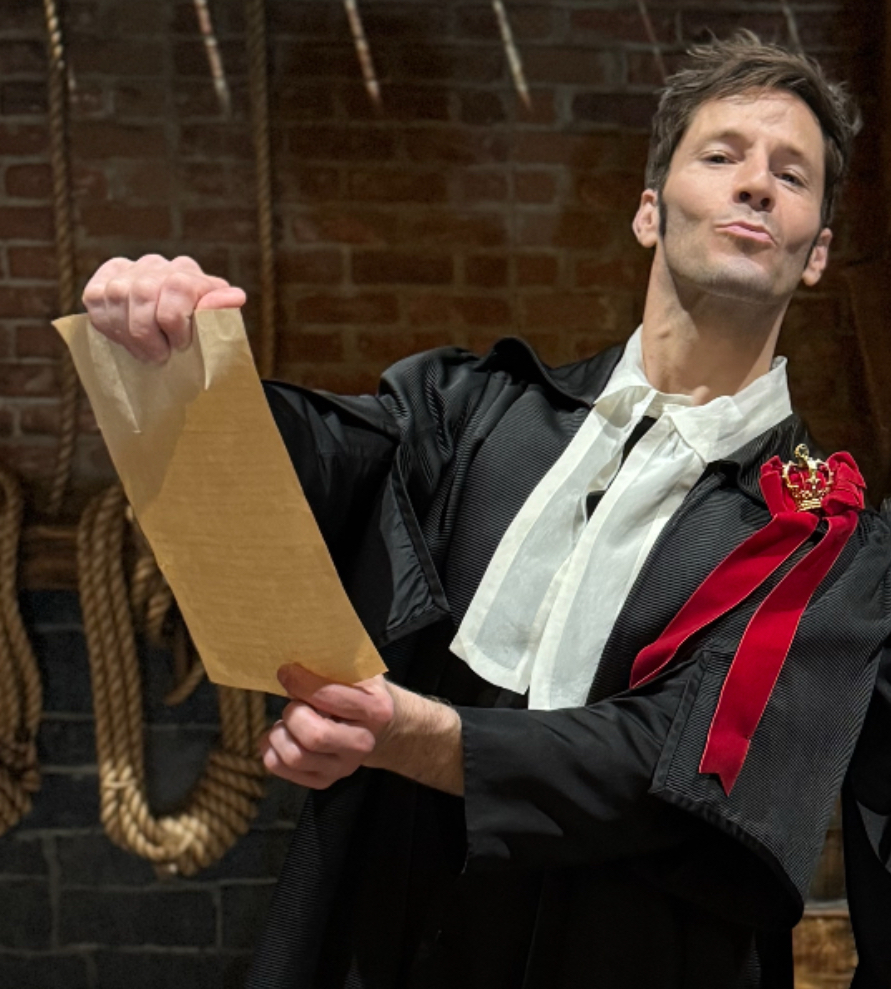
Seabury is portrayed in the 2015 Broadway musical Hamilton and the 2020 film Hamilton by Thayne Jasperson.

In the 2015 musical Hamilton written by Lin-Manuel Miranda, Seabury appears as the lead vocalist in the song "Farmer Refuted", named after Hamilton's letter to Seabury and detailing their notable feud regarding the American Revolution. Seabury was portrayed by Thayne Jasperson in the original cast. Jasperson is still performing as Seabury in Richard Rodgers Theatre.

== See also ==
- List of presiding bishops of the Episcopal Church in the United States of America
- List of Episcopal bishops of the United States
- Historical list of the Episcopal bishops of the United States
- William Jones Seabury

== Sources ==
- McBride, Spencer W. (2016). Pulpit and Nation: Clergymen and the Politics of Revolutionary America. Charlottesville: University of Virginia Press.
- Hebb, Ross N. (2010). Samuel Seabury and Charles Inglis: Two Bishops, Two Churches. Fairleigh Dickinson University Press.
- Beardsley, Eben Edwards (1881). Life and Correspondence of the Right Reverend Samuel Seabury, D.D.: First Bishop of Connecticut, and of the Episcopal Church in the United States of America. Boston: Houghton, Mifflin.
- The Primus Project (2023), The Founding of Trinity College, Part I: The Slave Economy, Retrieved December 6, 2024.
- Steiner, Bruce (1972). Samuel Seabury, 1729–1796: a study in the High Church tradition. Ohio University Press. ISBN 9780821400982.
- Seabury, William Jones (1908). "Memoir of Samuel Seabury". anglicanhistory.org.
- Marshall, Paul V. (2004). One, Catholic, and Apostolic – Samuel Seabury and the Early Episcopal Church. New York: Church Publishing Incorporated.
- Wilkinson, Todd. "The Scottish Roots of the Episcopal Church". Scots History Online.

Episcopal Church (USA) titles
New title	Bishop of Connecticut; 1784–1796	Succeeded by Abraham Jarvis
Preceded by William White	Presiding Bishop; 1789–1792	Succeeded by Samuel Provoost
