= Ashbel Baldwin =

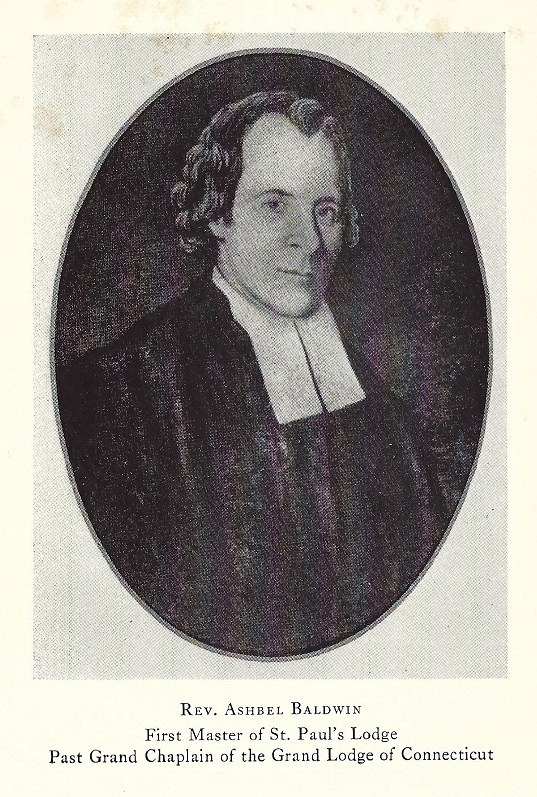
- Born: March 7, 1757; Litchfield
- Died: February 8, 1846 (aged 88); Rochester

Ashbel Baldwin (March 7, 1757 – February 8, 1846) was an American Episcopalian clergyman.

Ashbel Baldwin was born on March 7, 1757 in Litchfield, Connecticut. He graduated from Yale College in 1776, and was a quartermaster in the Continental Army. On 3 Aug., 1785, he was ordained to the diaconate by Bishop Seabury in Middletown. This was the first Episcopal ordination in the United States. He was ordained priest in September following, and became rector of St. Michael's Church, Litchfield, where he remained until 1793. From 1793 to 1824 he was rector of Christ Church, Stratford. He then held parishes in Wallingford, Meriden, North Haven, and Oxford, until in 1832 he became disabled by age. His records show that he had preached 10,000 times, and baptized 3,010 persons. He was secretary of the General Convention, and also of the diocesan convention of Connecticut. Ashbel Baldwin died on 8 February 1846 in Rochester, New York.
