= David Moir (bishop) =

The Right Reverend David Moir D.D.
- Bishop of Brechin
- Church: Scottish Episcopal Church
- Diocese: Brechin
- In office: 1840-1847
- Predecessor: George Gleig
- Successor: Alexander Forbes
- Other post: Coadjutor bishop of Brechin (1837-1840)

Orders
- Consecration: 8 October 1837 by James Walker

Personal details
- Died: 21 August 1847
- Denomination: Anglican

Styles of David Moir, D.D.
- Reference style: The Right Reverend
- Spoken style: My Lord or Bishop

David Moir, D.D. (died 1847) was an Anglican clergyman who served in the Scottish Episcopal Church as the Bishop of Brechin from 1840 to 1847.

== Biography ==
He was the minister of St Andrew's Church, Brechin when he was elected by the clergy of the Diocese of Brechin to be the Coadjutor Bishop to the aged Diocesan Bishop George Gleig in 1837. He was consecrated to the Episcopate at Edinburgh on 8 October 1837 by bishops Walker, Skinner and Low. In August 1839, he was conferred a Doctorate of Divinity by Washington College (now Trinity College), Hartford, Connecticut "as a token of friendly recognition and intercommunion between the Scottish Episcopal Church, and her daughter Church in America." On the death of Bishop Gleig on 9 March 1840, he succeeded as the Diocesan Bishop of Brechin.

He died in office on 21 August 1847.

Scottish Episcopal Church titles
Preceded by George Gleig	Bishop of Brechin; 1840–1847	Succeeded by Alexander Forbes
