= Admiral Fraser =

Admiral Fraser may refer to:

- Alexander Fraser (Royal Navy officer) (1747–1829), British Royal Navy vice admiral
- Bruce Fraser, 1st Baron Fraser of North Cape (1888–1981), British Royal Navy admiral
- Thomas Fraser (Royal Navy officer) (1796–1870), British Royal Navy vice admiral
- Tim Fraser (fl. 1980s–2020s), British Royal Navy admiral
