= Alexander Jolly =

The Right Reverend Alexander Jolly D.D.
- Bishop of Moray
- Church: Scottish Episcopal Church
- Diocese: Moray
- Elected: 14 February 1798
- In office: 1798-1838
- Predecessor: Andrew Macfarlane
- Successor: David Low
- Previous posts: Coadjutor Bishop of Moray, Ross, and Argyll (1796-1798)

Orders
- Ordination: 19 March 1777 by Robert Kilgour
- Consecration: 24 June 1796 by William Abernethy Drummond

Personal details
- Born: 3 April 1756 Stonehaven, Kincardineshire, Scotland
- Died: 29 June 1838 (aged 82) Fraserburgh, Aberdeenshire, Scotland
- Buried: St Congan's Churchyard, Turriff
- Denomination: Anglican

Sainthood
- Feast day: 27 June
- Venerated in: Scottish Episcopal Church

Alexander Jolly (3 April 1756 – 29 June 1838) was bishop of Moray, Ross and Caithness in the Scottish Episcopal Church.

== Life ==
He was born on 3 April 1756, at Stonehaven, Kincardineshire, he was educated at Marischal College, Aberdeen, was ordained deacon in the Scottish episcopal church on 1 July 1776, and admitted priest on 19 March 1777. He was appointed to the congregation at Turriff, Aberdeenshire, taking at the same time occasional duty at Parkdargue (Forgue), and then at Banff and Portsoy.

At the desire of Robert Kilgour, Bishop of Aberdeen, Jolly in April 1788 left Turriff for Fraserburgh. 24 June 1796 he was chosen coadjutor to Andrew MacFarlane, bishop of Moray and Ross. After two years of nominal coadjutorship, he was collated (22 February 1798) to the sole episcopal charge of the lowland diocese of Moray, which the bishops had in Jolly's interest disjoined from the highland dioceses of Ross and Argyll, in spite of the opposition of the primus William Skinner. Jolly continued to discharge at the same time the duties of an ordinary pastor in Fraserburgh, where he lived by himself in a plain two-story house in Cross Street. He kept no regular servant, and preferred seclusion. He read daily a fixed number of pages of the Hebrew bible and the Greek New Testament, and portions of the Church Fathers, especially John Chrysostom and Augustine of Hippo. He spent his savings from his income in charity or on books.

He declined in 1819 the offer of the see of Ross and Argyll. In 1826 he received the degree of D.D. from Washington College, Connecticut now Trinity College. He died at Fraserburgh on 29 June 1838, and was buried on 5 July beside his brother James in Turriff churchyard. A mural tablet was erected to his memory in the church. His library, which he left to the church, was deposited in the institute in Hill Street, Edinburgh. In his lectures on the church of Scotland, delivered in Edinburgh in 1872, Arthur Penrhyn Stanley selected Jolly ‘as a choice specimen of the old episcopalian clergy.’

== Works ==
In 1783 he published at Edinburgh ‘Instructions concerning the Nature and Constitution of the Christian Church, the Divine Appointment of its Governors and Pastors, and the nature and guilt of Schism’ (reprinted at Oxford in 1840 and by the Scottish Tract Society in 1849). During 1826 he published a short treatise entitled ‘A Friendly Address to the Episcopalians of Scotland on Baptismal Regeneration,’ a reply to the attacks made on Scottish episcopal teaching by the Rev. Edward Craig of Edinburgh. Later editions issued in 1840, 1841, and 1850 contain a memoir of the bishop by Patrick Cheyne.

Jolly's most popular work was ‘Observations upon the several Sunday Services and principal Holydays prescribed by the Liturgy throughout the Year,’ 1828; 3rd edit., Edinburgh, 1840, with memoir by James Walker, bishop and primus. His last work was ‘The Christian Sacrifice in the Eucharist considered, as it is, the Doctrine of Holy Scripture,’ 1831.
