= Andrew McFarlane =

Andrew McFarlane may refer to:

- Andrew McFarlane (Australian actor) (born 1951), Australian actor
- Andrew McFarlane (judge) (born 1954), British judge
- Andrew McFarlane (motorcyclist) (1977–2010), Australian motocross racer
- Andy McFarlane (born 1966), English footballer
- Andy McFarlane (cricketer) (1899–1972), Irish cricketer

== See also ==
- Andrew Macfarlane (d.1819), Anglican clergyman
