= Charles Terrot (bishop) =

Scottish Episcopalian minister, theologian and mathematician (1790–1872)

The Right Reverend Charles Terrot
- Bishop of Edinburgh; Primus of the Scottish Episcopal Church
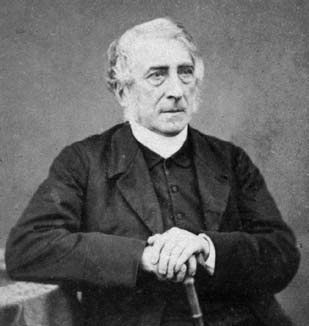
- Church: Scottish Episcopal Church
- Elected: 1841
- In office: 1830–1841
- Predecessor: James Walker
- Successor: Henry Cotterill
- Other post: Primus of the Scottish Episcopal Church (1857–1862)

Orders
- Ordination: 1814
- Consecration: 2 June 1841 by William Skinner

Personal details
- Born: 19 September 1790 Cuddalore, India
- Died: 2 April 1872 (aged 81) Edinburgh, Scotland
- Buried: New Calton Burial Ground
- Denomination: Anglican
- Parents: Elias Terrot & Mary Fonteneau
- Spouse: Sarah Ingram Wood (1815–1855); Charlotte Madden (1859–1862)
- Children: 1
- Education: Trinity College, Cambridge

Charles Hughes Terrot FRSE (19 September 1790 – 2 April 1872) was a Scottish Episcopalian minister, theologian and mathematician. He served as Primus of the Scottish Episcopal Church from 1857 to 1862.

== Life ==
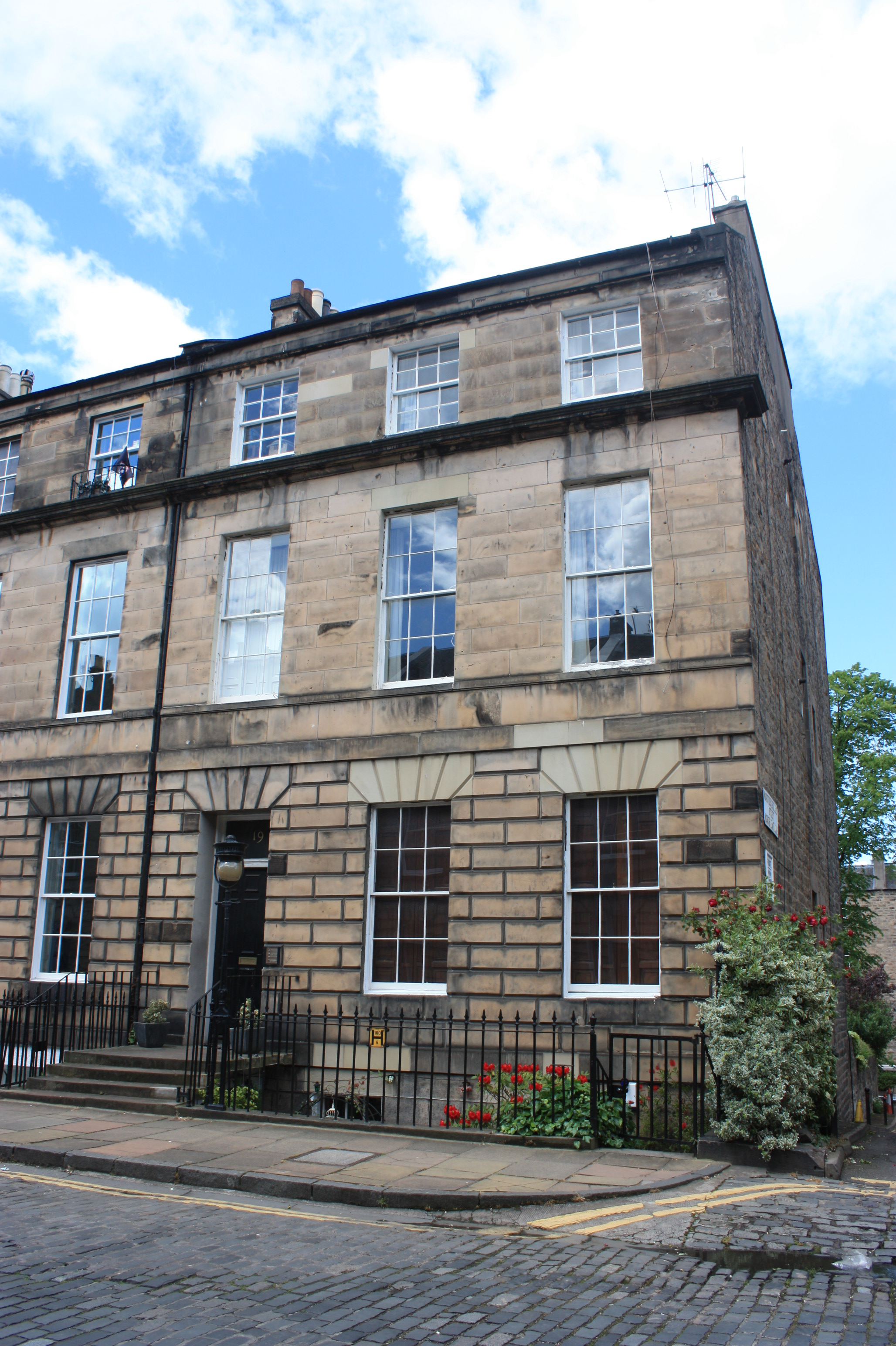
Terrot's home at 19 Northumberland Street, Edinburgh

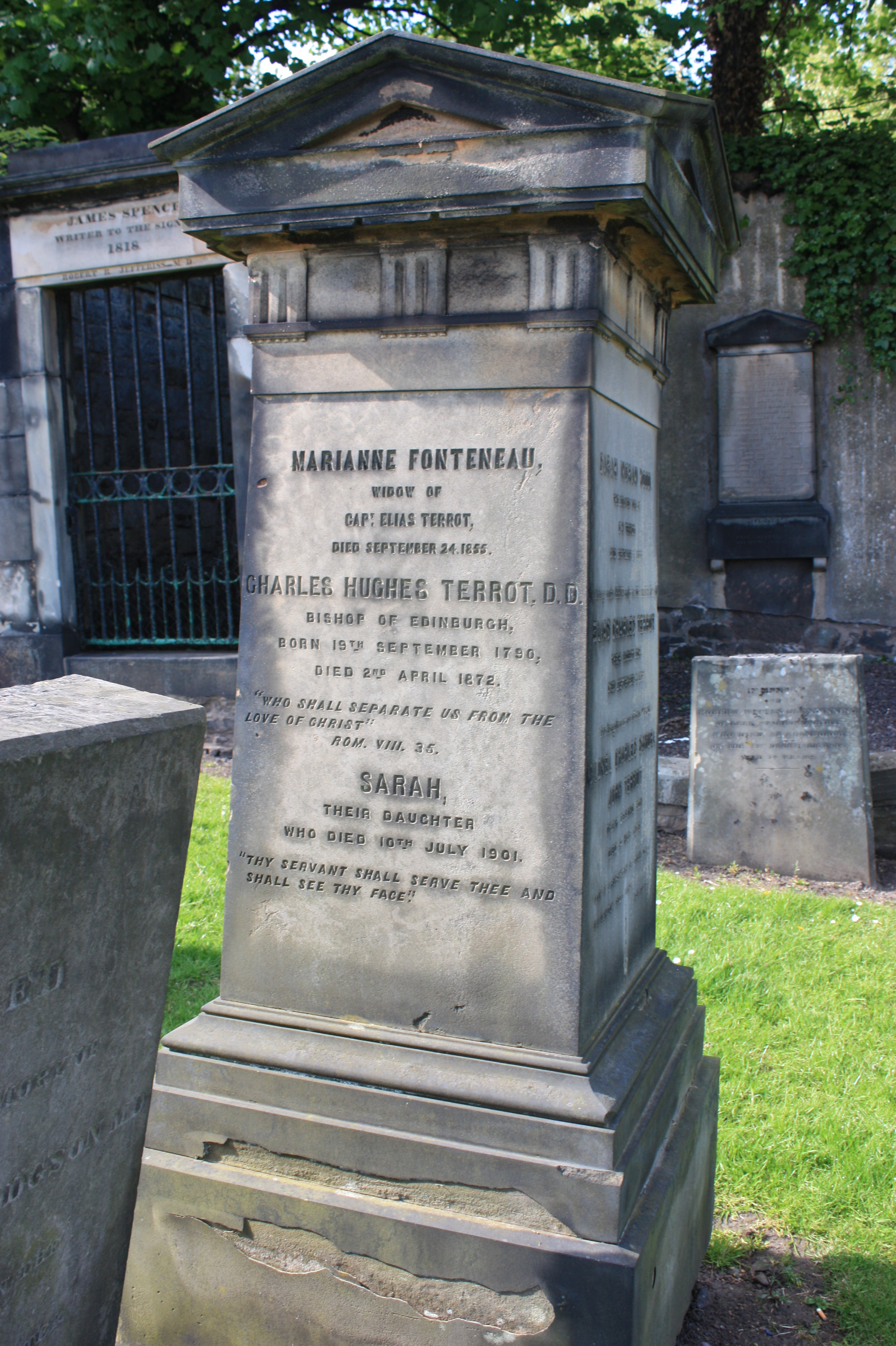
The grave of Charles Terrot, New Calton Cemetery

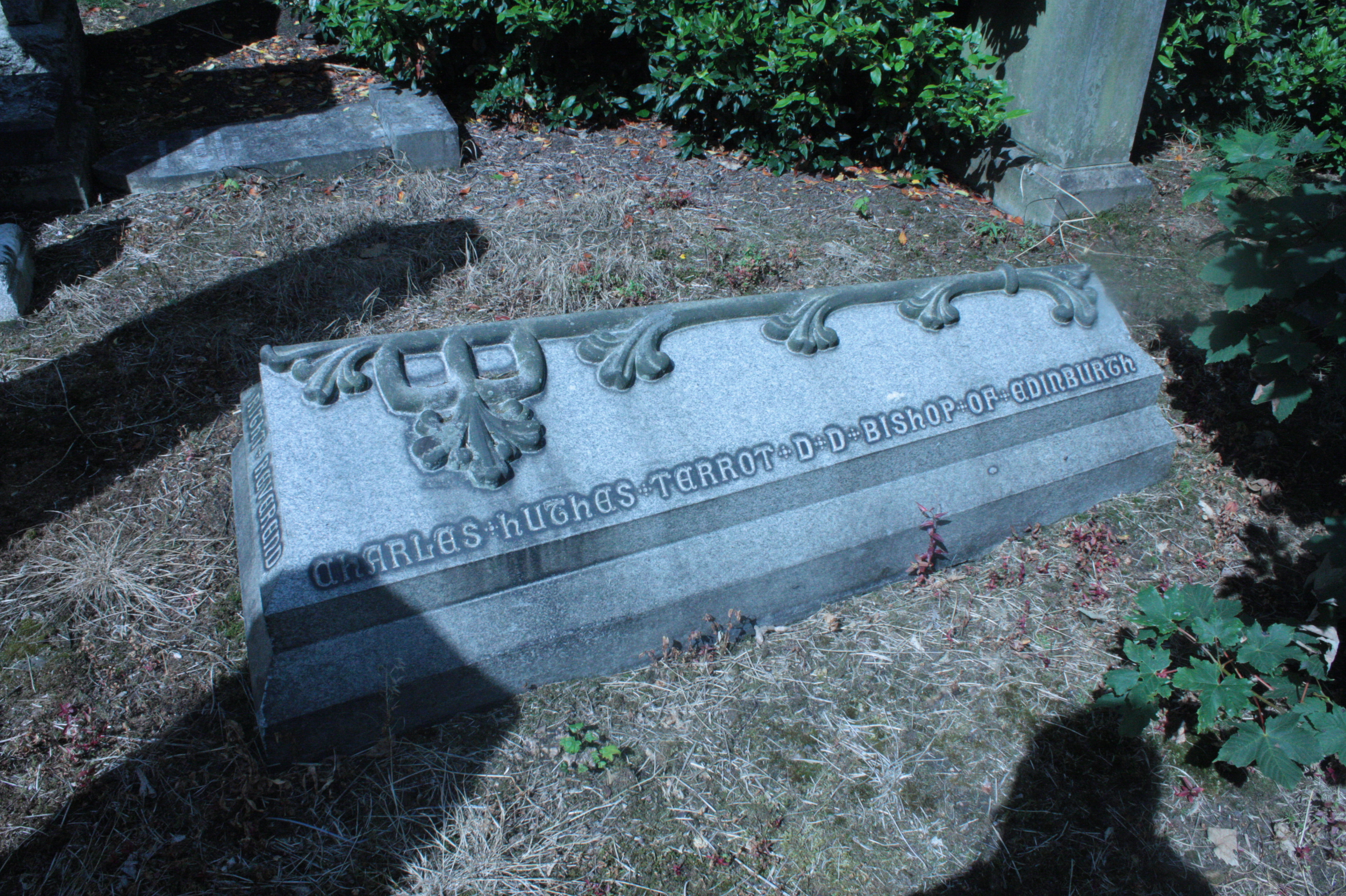
Grave of Charlotte Maddon, Charles Hughes Terrot's wife, Warriston Cemetery

Charles Terrot was born on 19 September 1790 at Cuddalore in southern India, the son of Captain Elias Terrot of the Indian Army who was killed at the siege of Bangalore a few weeks after Charles' birth. His mother, Mary Fonteneau, returned to England soon after, and raised Charles in Berwick-upon-Tweed.

He was educated at Carlisle Grammar School and Trinity College, Cambridge, where he graduated BA in 1812. He became a Fellow of Trinity in 1813.

In 1813 he served as a Deacon in Bristol before moving to Chester as a priest. He returned to Scotland in 1814 to serve as an Incumbent in Haddington. In 1833 he served in St Pauls in Edinburgh leading to his rise to Dean in 1837 and Bishop in 1841. During this time he lived at 19 Northumberland Street in Edinburgh's New Town.

He was elected a Fellow of the Royal Society of Edinburgh in 1840, his proposer being James David Forbes, and served as their vice president from 1844 to 1860. He was also a member of the Architectural Society of Scotland.

From 1856 until 1872 he was assisted in his role as Bishop by his chaplain Charles Richard Teape; Thomas Baker Morrell was his coadjutor-bishop from 1863 until 1869, shortly after Terrot's retirement.

He died at home at 9 Carlton Street in Edinburgh on 2 April 1872 and is buried in New Calton Burial Ground with his daughter.

His second wife died before him and is buried separately in Warriston Cemetery.

== Family ==
He married twice, firstly in 1815 to Sarah Ingram Wood (d.1855), secondly, and briefly, in 1859 to Charlotte Madden (d.1862). He had a daughter, Sarah Terrot (d.1901) by his first marriage.

== Publications ==
- The Epistle of Paul to the Romans (1828)
- Principles of Biblical Interpretation (1832)
