= David Low (bishop) =

David Low (November 1768 – 26 January 1855) was an Anglican clergyman who served in the Scottish Episcopal Church as the Bishop of Ross (1819–1850), Bishop of Argyll (1819–1846) and Bishop of Moray (1838–1850).

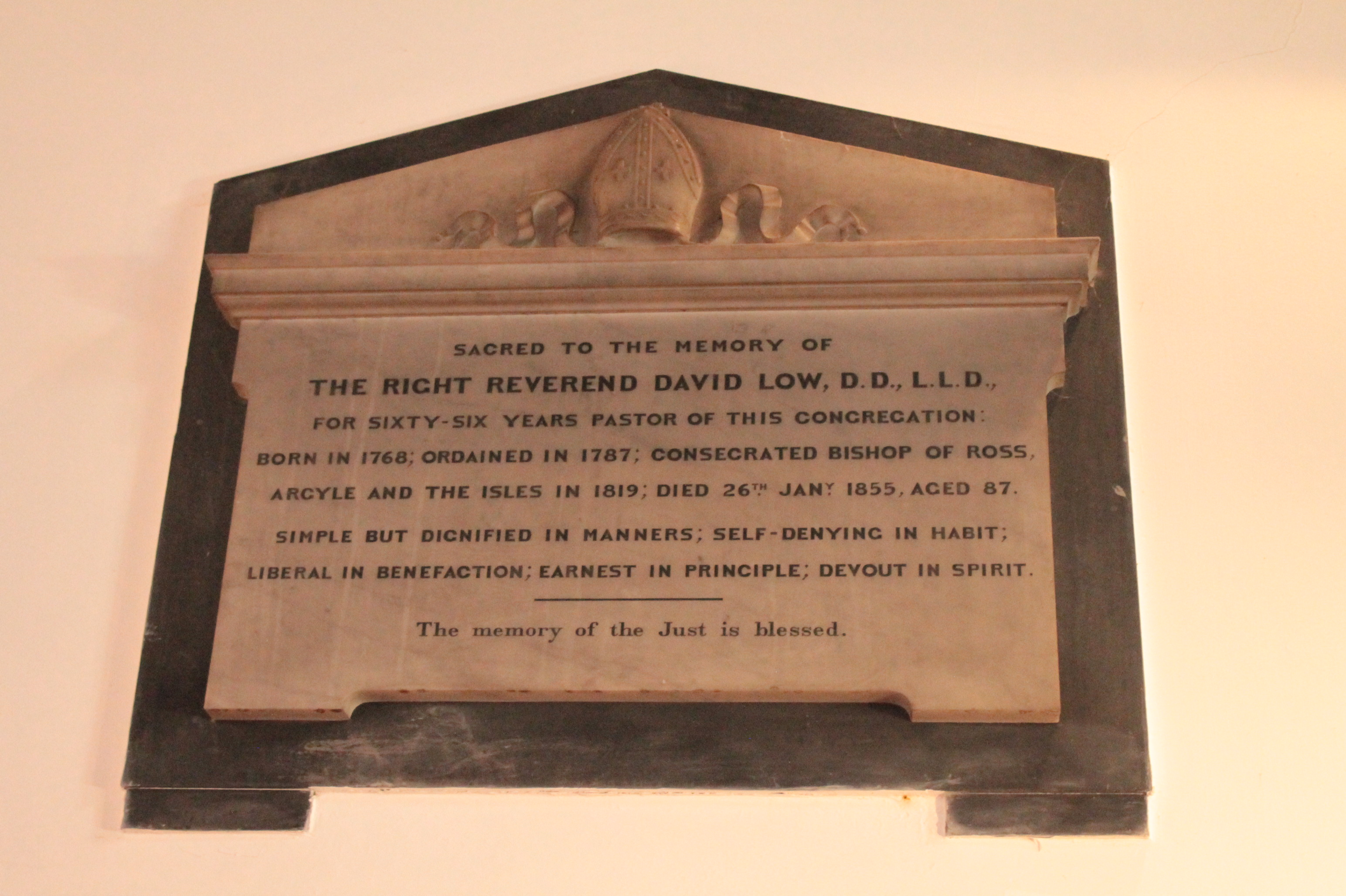
Memorial to Bishop David Low, Pittenweem Episcopal Church

Born in Brechin, Scotland in November 1768, he was educated at Marischal College, Aberdeen. He was ordained a deacon and priest in 1789 by John Strachan, Bishop of Brechin. Low, presbyter of St John's Episcopal Church, Pittenweem, was unanimously elected Bishop of Ross and of Argyll by the clergy of those dioceses in 1819. He was consecrated at Stirling on 14 November 1819 by George Gleig, Bishop of Brechin and Primus; Alexander Jolly, Bishop of Moray; and Patrick Torry, Bishop of Dunkeld and of Dunblane. On the death of Jolly in 1838, Low also became the Bishop of Moray. He resigned the See of Argyll in 1846, and four years later, resigned the Sees of Moray and Ross on 19 December 1850.

Low died at Pittenweem on 26 January 1855, aged 86, and was buried in a grave on the south-side of St John's Episcopal Church, Pittenweem on 1 February 1855.

== Bibliography ==
- Dowden, John (1912). Thomson, J. Maitland (ed.). The Bishops of Scotland. Glasgow: James Maclehose and Son.
- Keith, Robert (1824). Russel, Michael (ed.). An Historical Catalogue of the Scottish Bishops: Down To The Year 1688. Edinburgh: Printed for Bell and Bradfute.

Scottish Episcopal Church titles
Preceded by Andrew Macfarlane	Bishop of Argyll; 1819–1846	Succeeded by Alexander Ewing (Bishop of Argyll & The Isles)
Preceded by Andrew Macfarlane	Bishop of Ross; 1819–1850	Succeeded by Robert Eden
Preceded by Alexander Jolly	Bishop of Moray; 1838–1850	Succeeded by Robert Eden
