= James Walker (bishop) =

Scottish bishop

The Most Reverend James Walker
- Bishop of Edinburgh; Primus of the Scottish Episcopal Church
- Church: Scottish Episcopal Church
- Elected: 10 February 1830
- In office: 1830-1841
- Predecessor: Daniel Sandford
- Successor: Charles Terrot
- Other post: Primus of the Scottish Episcopal Church (1837–1841)

Orders
- Ordination: 5 May 1805
- Consecration: 7 March 1830 by George Gleig

Personal details
- Born: January 24, 1770 Fraserburgh, Aberdeenshire, Scotland
- Died: March 5, 1841 (aged 71) Edinburgh, Scotland
- Buried: St John's, Edinburgh
- Denomination: Anglican
- Parents: Alexander Walker & Jane Ramsey
- Spouse: Madeline Erskine

Styles of James Walker
- Reference style: The Most Reverend
- Spoken style: Your Grace

James Walker FRSE (24 January 1770 – 5 March 1841) was an Episcopalian bishop who served as the Bishop of Edinburgh (1830–1841) and Primus of the Scottish Episcopal Church (1837–1841).

== Early life and education ==
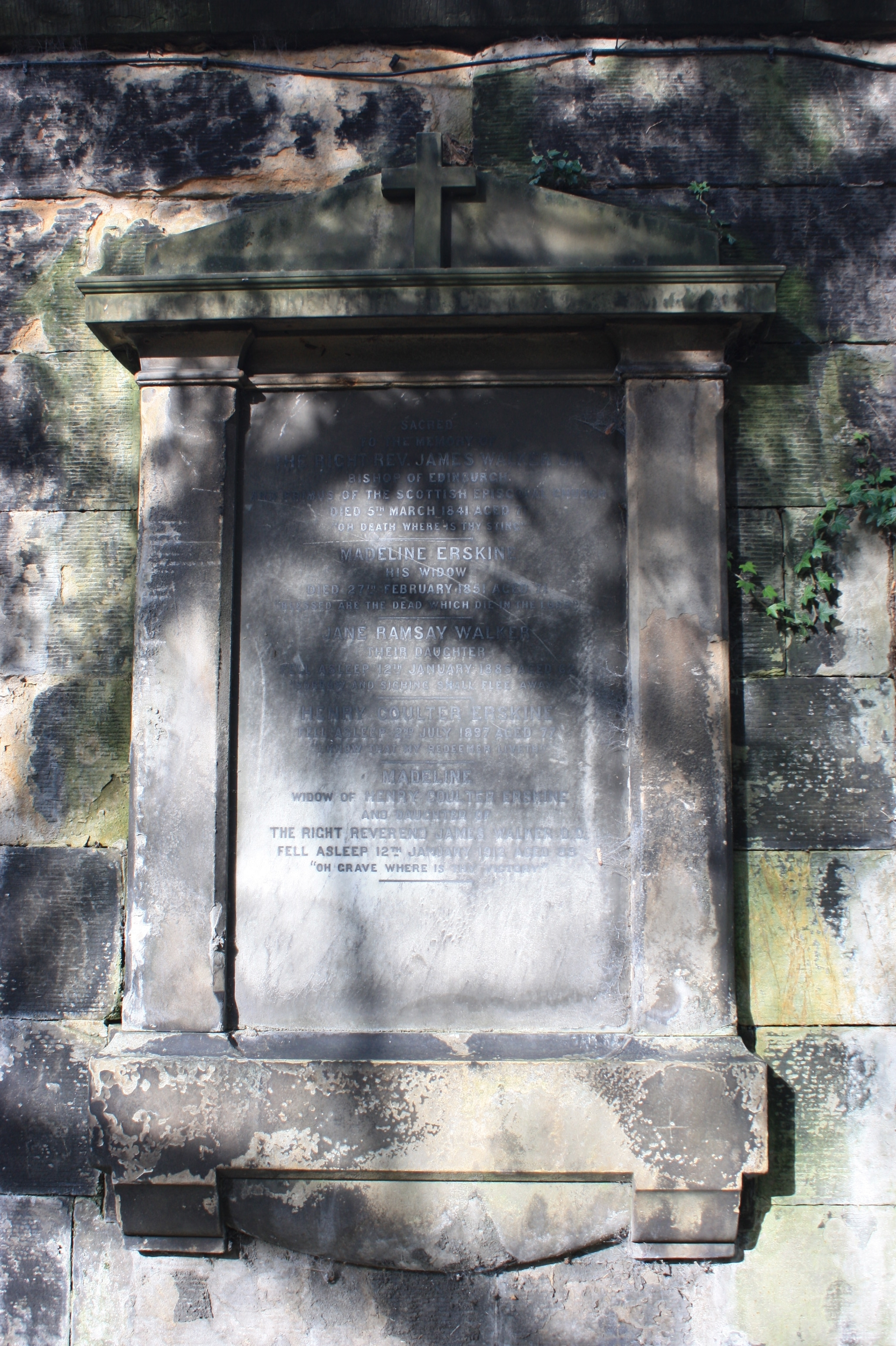
Walker's grave at St John's Edinburgh

He was born in Fraserburgh on 24 January 1770, son of Alexander Walker and Jane Ramsey. He was educated at Marischal College, Aberdeen from 1785 to 1789, where he was awarded a Master of Arts degree in 1789. He continued his education at St John's College, Cambridge, where awarded a Bachelor of Arts in 1793, another Master of Arts in 1796, and a Doctor of Divinity in 1826.

== Ecclesiastical career ==
He was ordained in the Anglican ministry a deacon on 3 April 1793 and a priest on 5 May 1805. During that period, he was tutor to Sir John Hope, 11th Baronet, of Craighall, from 1793 to 1805. Walker's first pastoral appointment was the Incumbent of St Peter's Church, Edinburgh (1807–29) and Old St Paul's Church, Edinburgh (1821–22). He was also the Dean of Edinburgh (1810–18) and Pantonian Professor of Theology at the Edinburgh Theological College (1824–41).

He was elected Episcopalian Bishop of Edinburgh on 10 February 1830 and consecrated at Stirling on 7 March 1830 by George Gleig, with bishops Jolly, Skinner and Low serving as co-consecrators. Walker also administered the sees of Fife, Galloway and Glasgow from 1830 to 1837. Following the resignation of George Gleig in February 1837, he was elected Primus of the Scottish Episcopal Church on 24 May 1837.

Walker died in office at 22 Stafford Street, Edinburgh on 5 March 1841, aged 71, and was buried on a south-facing wall in the centre of St John's Churchyard, Edinburgh.

== Family ==
He married Madeline Erskine (1780-1851) on 20 February 1821.

They had twin daughters, Madeline Walker (1822-1912) and Jane Ramsay Walker (1822-1885). Madeline married Henry Coulter Erskine (1820-1897).

== Bibliography ==
- Bertie, David M. (2000). Scottish Episcopal Clergy, 1689–2000. Edinburgh: T & T Clark. ISBN 0567087468.
- Gordon, J. F. S. (1867). Scotichronicon: Comprising Bishop Keith's Catalogue of Scottish Bishops. Vol. 2. Glasgow: John Tweed.

Scottish Episcopal Church titles
Preceded by Daniel Sandford	Bishop of Edinburgh; 1830–1841	Succeeded by Charles Hughes Terrot
Preceded by George Gleig	Primus of the Scottish Episcopal Church; 1837–1841	Succeeded by William Skinner
