= James Boyd (schoolmaster) =

James Boyd (24 December 1795 – 18 August 1856) was a schoolmaster and author.

== Life ==
Boyd was born on in Paisley on 24 December 1795, the son of a glover. After receiving his early education partly in Paisley and partly in Glasgow, he attended the University of Glasgow where he gained honours in humanities, Greek, and philosophy classes. After completing his BA and MA degrees, he went on to study medicine for two years; however, he abandoned his medical studies to study divinity at the Divinity Hall of the university. He was licensed to preach the gospel by the presbytery of Dumbarton in May 1822. Towards the close of that year he moved to Edinburgh, where for three years he was a private tuition. In 1825 he was unanimously chosen house governor in George Heriot's Hospital, Edinburgh. The University of Glasgow awarded him the honorary degree, Doctor of law.

Boyd became classical master in the High School of Edinburgh on 19 August 1829. The largely attended classes which he always had decisively proved the public estimate of his merits. In 1833 he is listed as living at 11 Castle Street, just off Princes Street.

For many years before his death, he held the office of secretary to the Edinburgh Society of Teachers. He died at his house in George Square, Edinburgh, on 18 August 1856, having nearly completed an incumbency of 27 years in the High School. He was interred at New Calton Burial Ground on 21 August 1856.

On 24 December 1829 he married Jane Reid, eldest daughter of John Easton, an Edinburgh merchant. Together they had nine children.

== Recognition and remembrance ==
The affectionate respect which all his pupils entertained towards Boyd is evinced by the number of clubs formed in his honour by his classes. In the Crimea, during the Russian war, two ‘Boyd clubs’ were formed by British officers in acknowledgment of their common relation to him as their preceptor. Within two months after his death a medal, to be named the Boyd medal, and to be annually presented to the ‘dux’ of the class in the high school taught by Boyd's successor, was subscribed for at a meeting held in Edinburgh by his friends and pupils.

== Works ==
Boyd's literary talents were confined to the editing of classical and other school books. They include:

1. Roman Antiquities by A. Adams, 1834, which was reprinted fifteen times during the editor's lifetime
2. Q. Horatii Flacci Poemata by C. Anthon, 1835, which passed through three editions
3. Archæologia Græca by J. Potter, Bishop of Oxford, 1837
4. Sallustii Opera by C. Anthon, 1839
5. Select Orations of Cicero by C. Anthon, 1842
6. A Greek Reader by C. Anthon, 1844
7. A Summary of the Principal Evidences of the Christian Religion by B. Porteus, Bishop of London, 1850
8. The First Greek Reader by Frederic Jacobs, 1851
