= John Skinner (poet) =

Scottish Episcopalian minister, historian, poet and songwriter

- Born: 31 October 1721; Balfour, Aberdeenshire
- Died: 16 June 1807 (aged 85)
- Education: Marischal College, Aberdeen
- Occupation(s): Episcopalian minister, historian, poet, songwriter

John Skinner (31 October 1721 – 16 June 1807) was a Scottish Episcopalian minister, historian, poet and songwriter.

Born in Balfour, Aberdeenshire, he was a son of a schoolmaster at Birse, and was educated at Marischal College, Aberdeen.

Brought up as a Presbyterian, he became an Episcopalian and ministered to a congregation at Longside, near Peterhead, for 65 years. After the failure of the Jacobite Rising, his congregation was subject to persecution and in May 1746 the Episcopalian chapel at Tiffery was burned by Government soldiers with the active participation of the local landowner, Lady Kinmundy. His house was also plundered.

For some years he had to minister to his congregation by stealth; and in 1753 he suffered six months' imprisonment for having officiated to more than four persons besides his own family. After 1760 the penal laws were less strictly enforced, but throughout the century the lot of the Episcopalian ministers in Scotland was far from comfortable, and only the humblest provisions for church services were tolerated.

Skinner wrote The Ecclesiastical History of Scotland from the Episcopal point of view, published in 1788, and several songs of which The Reel of Tullochgorum and The Ewie wi' the Crookit Horn are the best known, and he also rendered some of the Psalms into Latin. He kept up a rhyming correspondence with Robert Burns, who considered his Tullochgorum "the best Scotch song Scotland ever saw," and procured his collaboration for the Scots Musical Museum. Other of his lyrics are: "The Monymusk Christmas Ba'ing," a football idyll; and "John o' Badenyon." His best songs had been printed, but a collection was not published till 1809, under the title of Amusements of Leisure Hours.

He died at the home of his son, John Skinner, Bishop Coadjutor of Aberdeen on 16 June 1807.

In 2005, a collection of Skinner's poems edited by David M. Bertie was published by the Buchan Field Club.

== Sources ==
- Author and Bookinfo.com

== See also ==
- Scottish literature
