= David Peat (Royal Navy officer) =

David Peat (1793–1879) was a Scottish officer in the Royal Navy who attained the rank of admiral after his retirement.

He was born in Kirkcaldy on 21 June 1793. He was the son of Robert Peat (1773–1848) and Isobell Coushat.

He became a junior officer in the Royal Navy in April 1810 on HMS Archer, a 12-gun gun-brig under Admiral Sir Philip Durham. The ship saw action against Danish gun-boats in the North Sea. In January 1812, he transferred at the rank of midshipman to HMS Musquito under Captains Christopher Bell and James Tomkinson, travelling to Brazil and the West Indies. In the summer of 1814, he joined HMS Dunira under Captain Edward Boys in the Leeward Islands for three months before joining HMS Cracker. From December 1815 to June 1816, he was on board HMS Ajax, a 74-gun ship of the line under Captain George Mundy.

He saw action on HMS Ganymede and HMS Severn, both under Captain Wm M'Culloch, with smugglers at Deal in Kent in the winter of 1816/1817, being promoted to lieutenant on 24 November 1817. Reappointed to the Severn, they were posted to Dungeness, again dealing with smugglers. On one occasion, he killed a man with his naval cutlass. In the ensuing months, he was shot twice in the thigh at Folkestone and in June 1821, with only three other men, was attacked by 60 men, suffering 18 firearm wounds, while his quartermaster was killed. For his conduct and injuries, Peat was promoted to commander on 9 June 1821 and given a lifelong pension.

From 1836 to 1840, he was given gentler duties as an Inspecting Commander with the Coast Guard. On 2 August 1843, he married a woman named Elizabeth (née Ballingall), widow of David Pratt. He was promoted to captain on 1 January 1847.

He retired to Viewforth House in south-west Edinburgh. He was subsequently promoted to "Retired Rear-Admiral", as of 13 April 1865, vice-admiral on 1 October 1871, and full admiral.

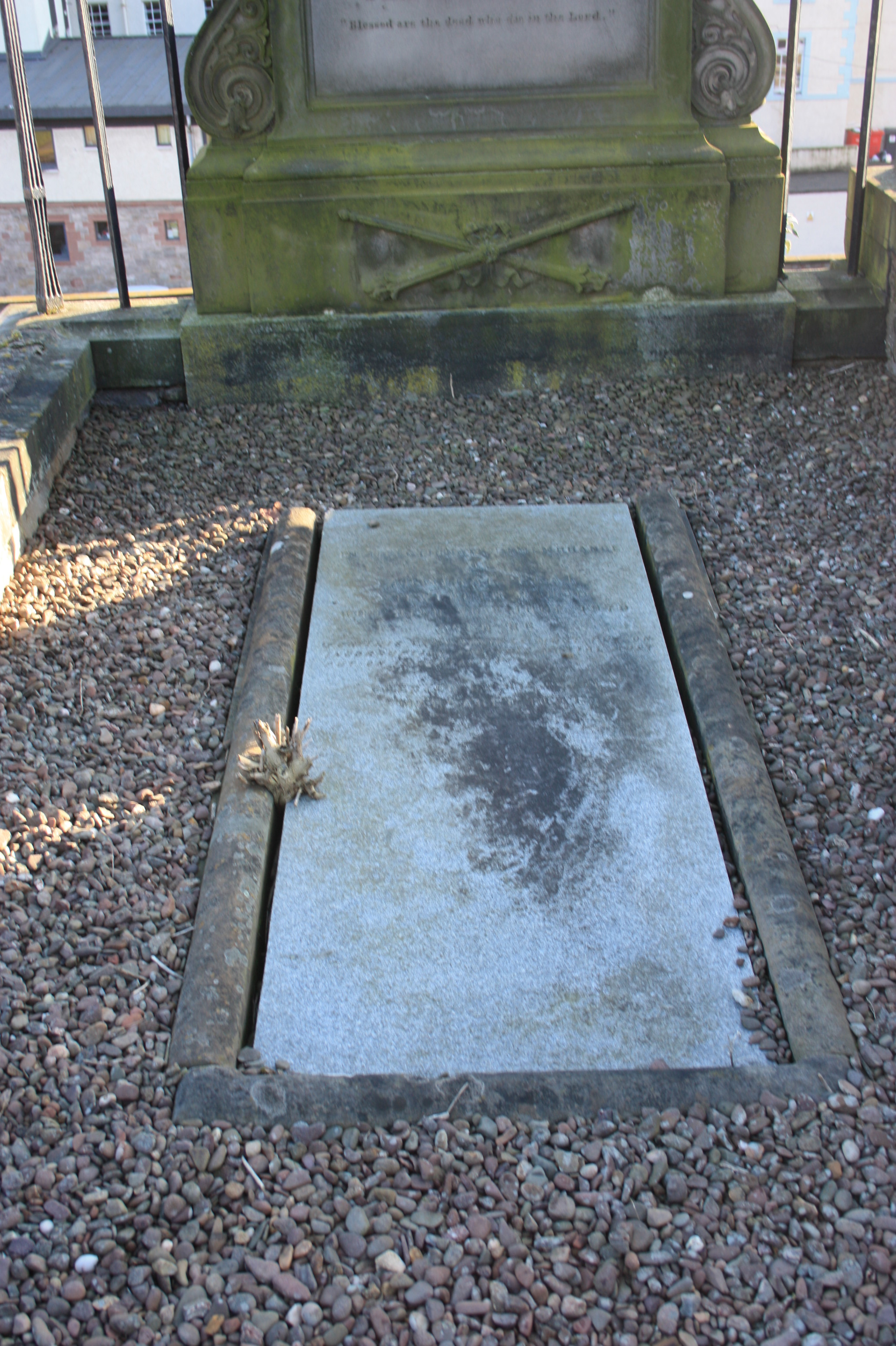
Memorial to Admiral David Peat, New Calton Burial Ground

He died on 20 June 1879 at Viewforth House, Edinburgh was buried in New Calton Burial Ground in Edinburgh on 25th June. There is a memorial in Northhall Cemetery at Markinch Church.

Viewforth House was demolished around 1900 in order to build Boroughmuir High School.

Admiral Terrace in the Tollcross area of Edinburgh (near Viewforth House) was named after Admiral Peat.
