= Charles Richard Teape =

Scottish Episcopalian priest and historian

Charles Richard Teape FRSE (1830–1905) was a Scottish Episcopalian priest and historian.

== Life ==
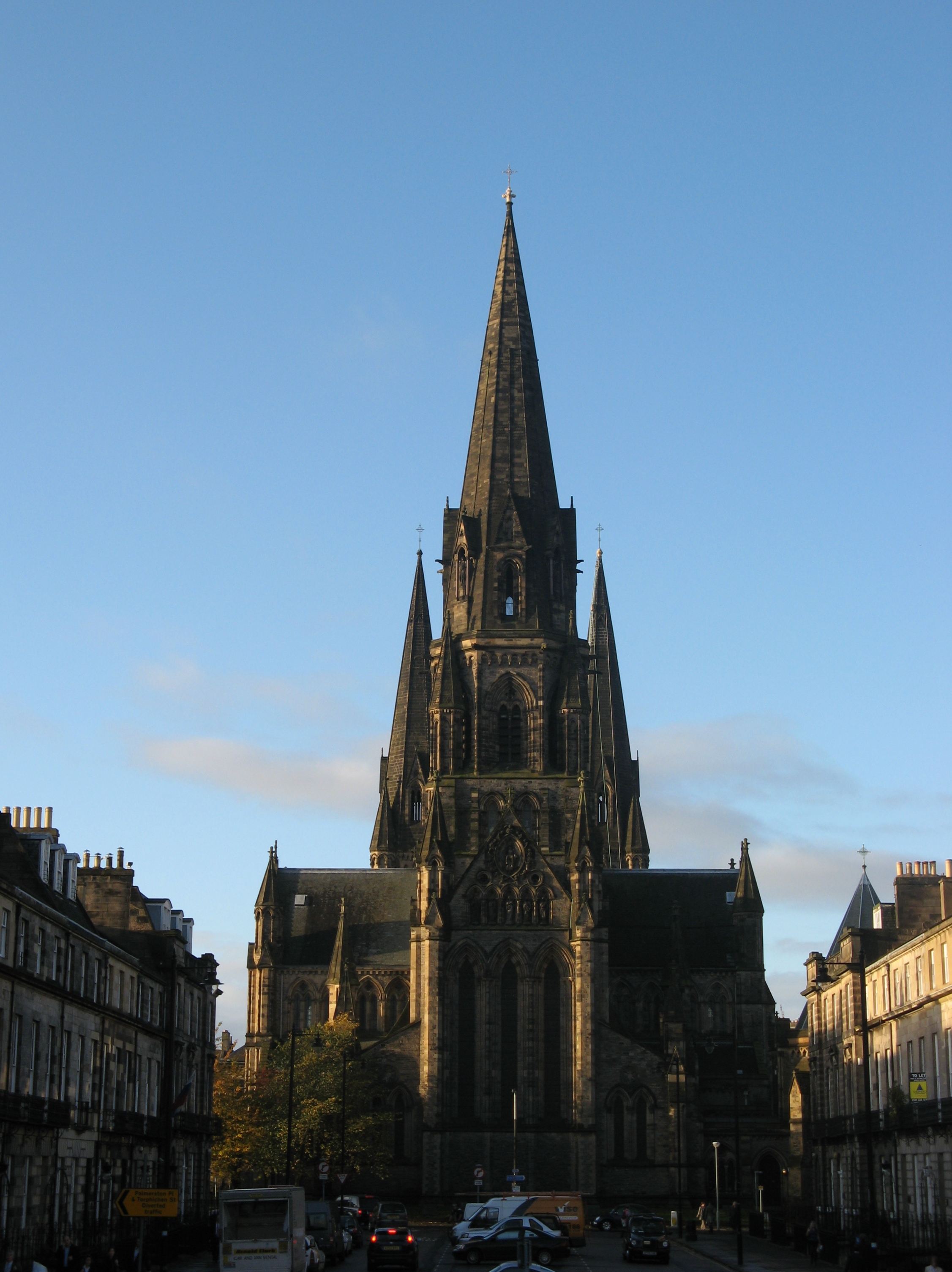
St Marys Edinburgh from Melville St

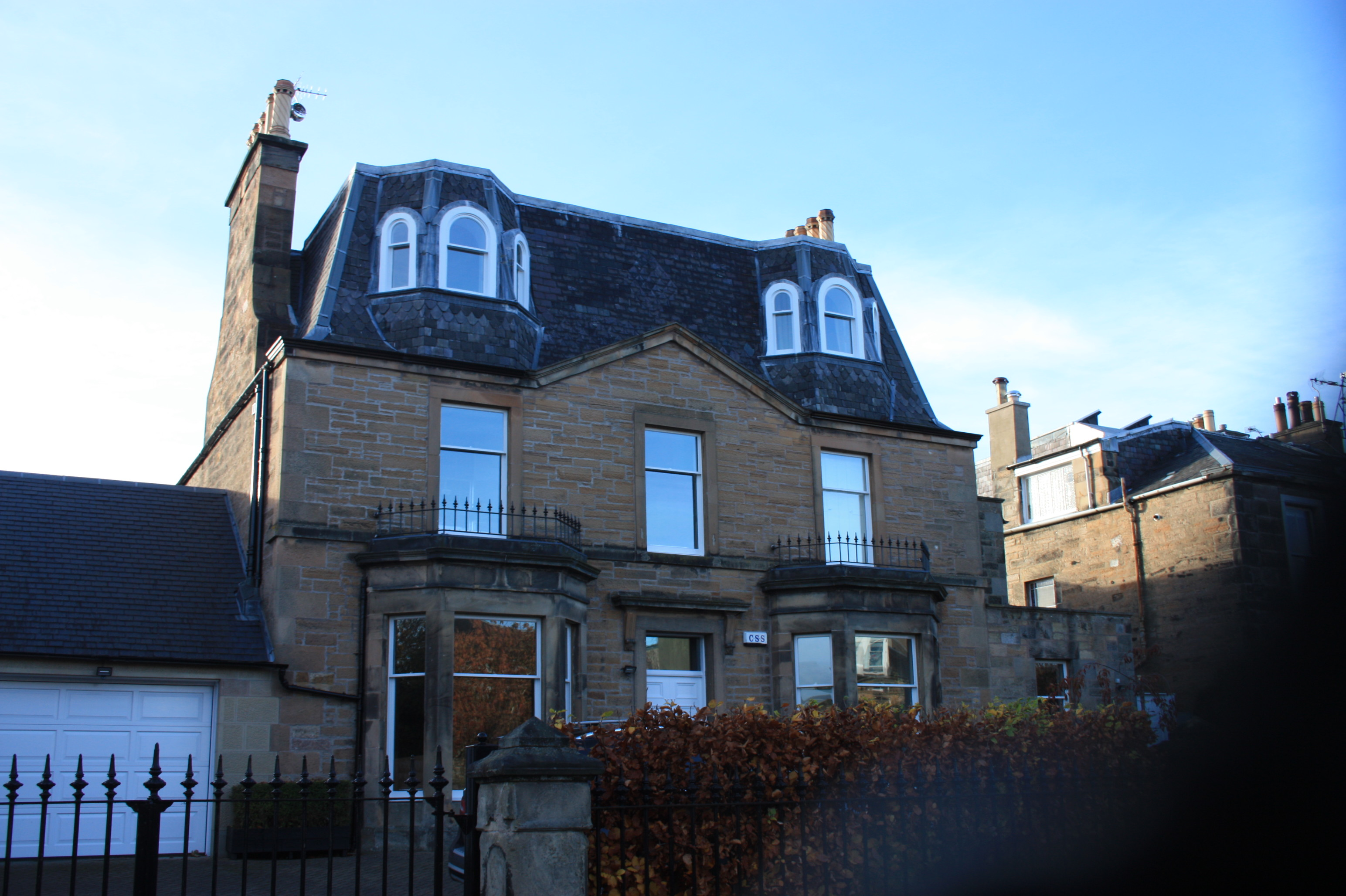
15 Findhorn Place, Edinburgh

His father is unclear. His mother was Elizabeth Douglas Teape (1782–1858).

He was born on 7 March 1830. He was educated at Glenalmond College in Perthshire. He then studied divinity at Trinity College, Dublin. He did postgraduate studies at Edinburgh Theological College and at Göttingen University in Germany.

He returned to Edinburgh as a deacon in 1853 but soon after went to Stirling to serve as a curate. He was ordained as a priest in 1854 and returned to Edinburgh in 1856 as chaplain to the Bishop of Edinburgh, Charles Terrot, based at St Mary's Episcopal Cathedral. His role as chaplain to the bishop ended on Terrot's death in 1872. Dean Montgomery did not continue the relationship. From 1857 till death he was incumbent at St Paul's Church at St John's Hill in the Canongate.

In 1866 he was living with his young family at 15 Findhorn Place in The Grange district in south Edinburgh. He appears to have remodelled the house in the later 19th century, greatly altering the attic level to add more rooms.

In 1872 he was elected a Fellow of the Royal Society of Edinburgh. His proposer was Philip Kelland.

From 1885 onwards he lectured at the Institute for Complete Training of Lady Nurses.

He died at 15 Findhorn Place on 14 February 1905 and is buried with his wife and mother in New Calton Cemetery in Edinburgh, close to his mentor, Bishop Terrot.

== Family ==
He married Mary Calder Marshall around 1865.

His son was Charles Richard Teape (1866–1919). He was also a minister. Charles Richard sometimes is listed as Charles Stanley. He died in Ilfracombe in Devon. A further son, Edward James Teape (1879–1955) died in Lincolnshire.

== Publications ==
- The Indian Crisis (1857)
- Prayers of Scripture (1866)
- Teaching of the Scottish Episcopal Church on the Lord's Supper (1868)
- The Alt-Katholic Movement in Germany (1873)
- Ritualism Exposed (1882)
- Pope's Pastoral (1886)
- The Post-Pentecostal Church (1886)
- The True History of the Scottish Communion Office (1889)
- The Queen's Diamond Jubilee: A Sermon (1897)
- Berkeleian Philosophy
