= New Calton Burial Ground =

Cemetery in Edinburgh, Scotland

Coordinates: 55°57′13″N 3°10′34″W

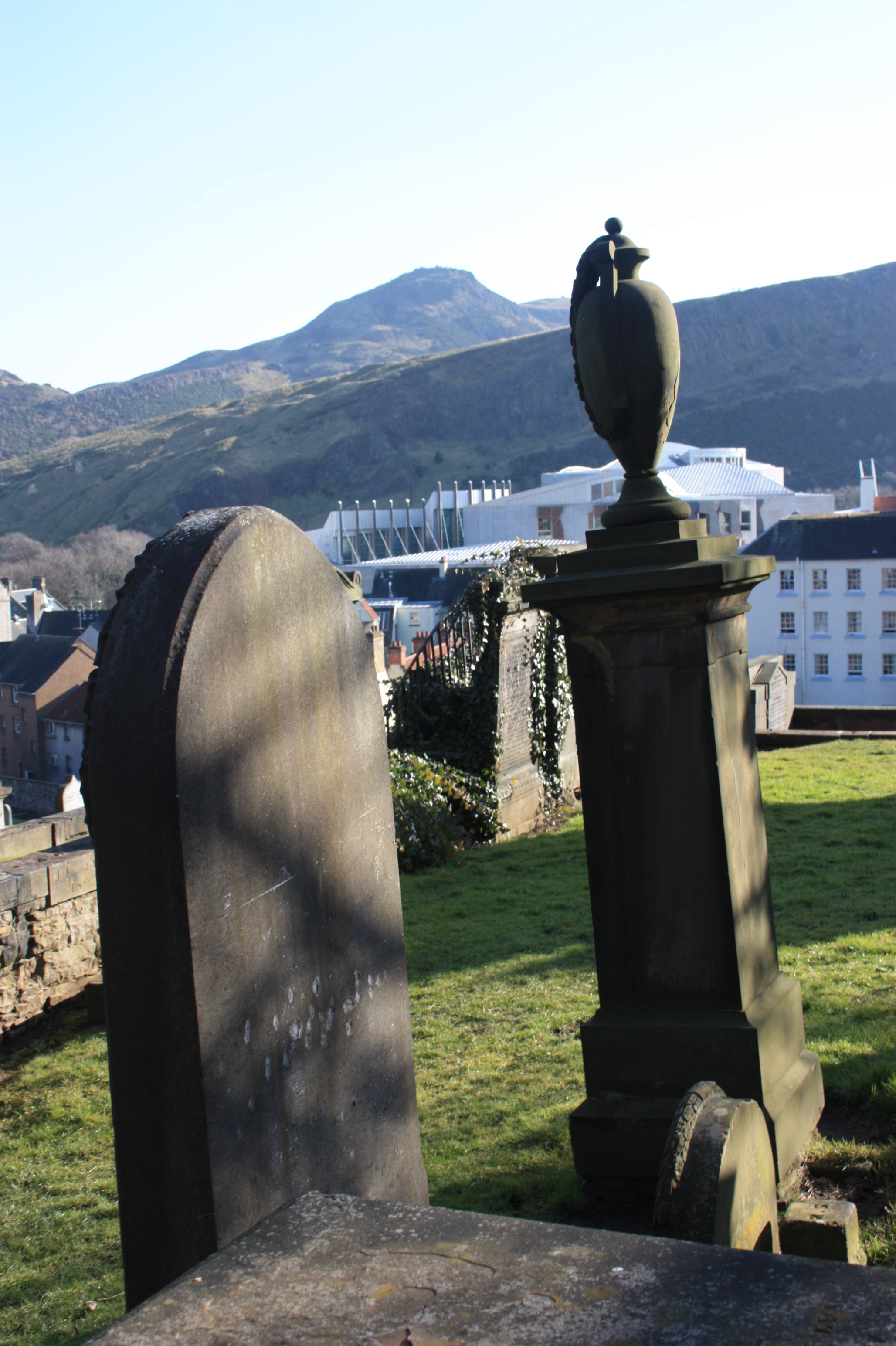
Monuments in New Calton Burial Ground with Arthur's Seat and the Scottish Parliament in the background

New Calton Burial Ground is a burial ground in Edinburgh. It was built as an overspill and functional replacement to Old Calton Burial Ground and lies half a mile to its east on Regent Road in Edinburgh, Scotland, on the south-east slopes of Calton Hill. On its southern edge it attaches to the north-east edge of the Canongate in the Old Town. It lies on a fairly steep south-facing slope with views to Holyrood Palace, the Scottish Parliament Building and Arthur’s Seat.

Of particular note is the Stevenson family plot, the resting place of several notable members of the family of Robert Louis Stevenson.

== Background ==
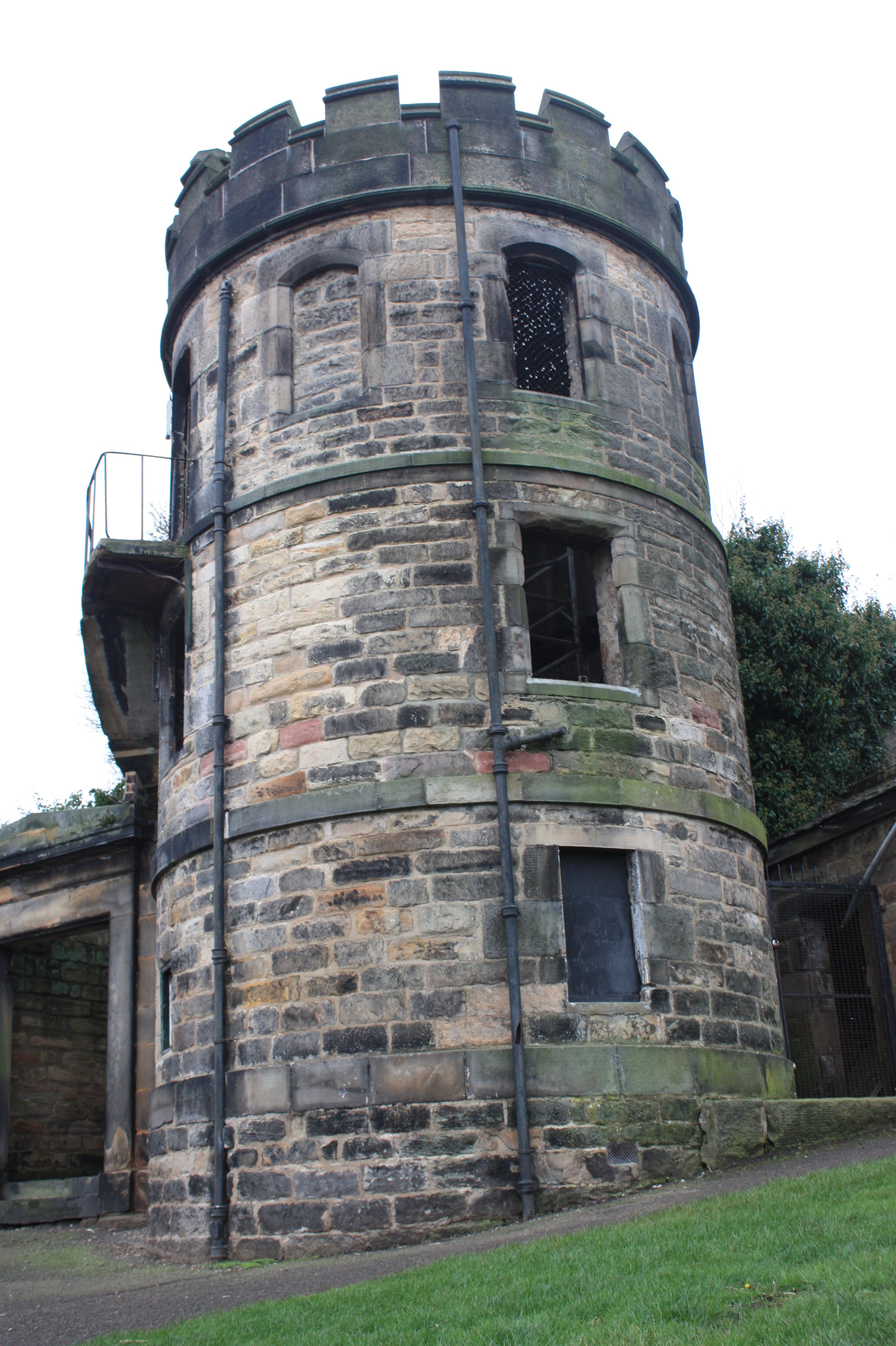
The Watch Tower, New Calton Burial Ground

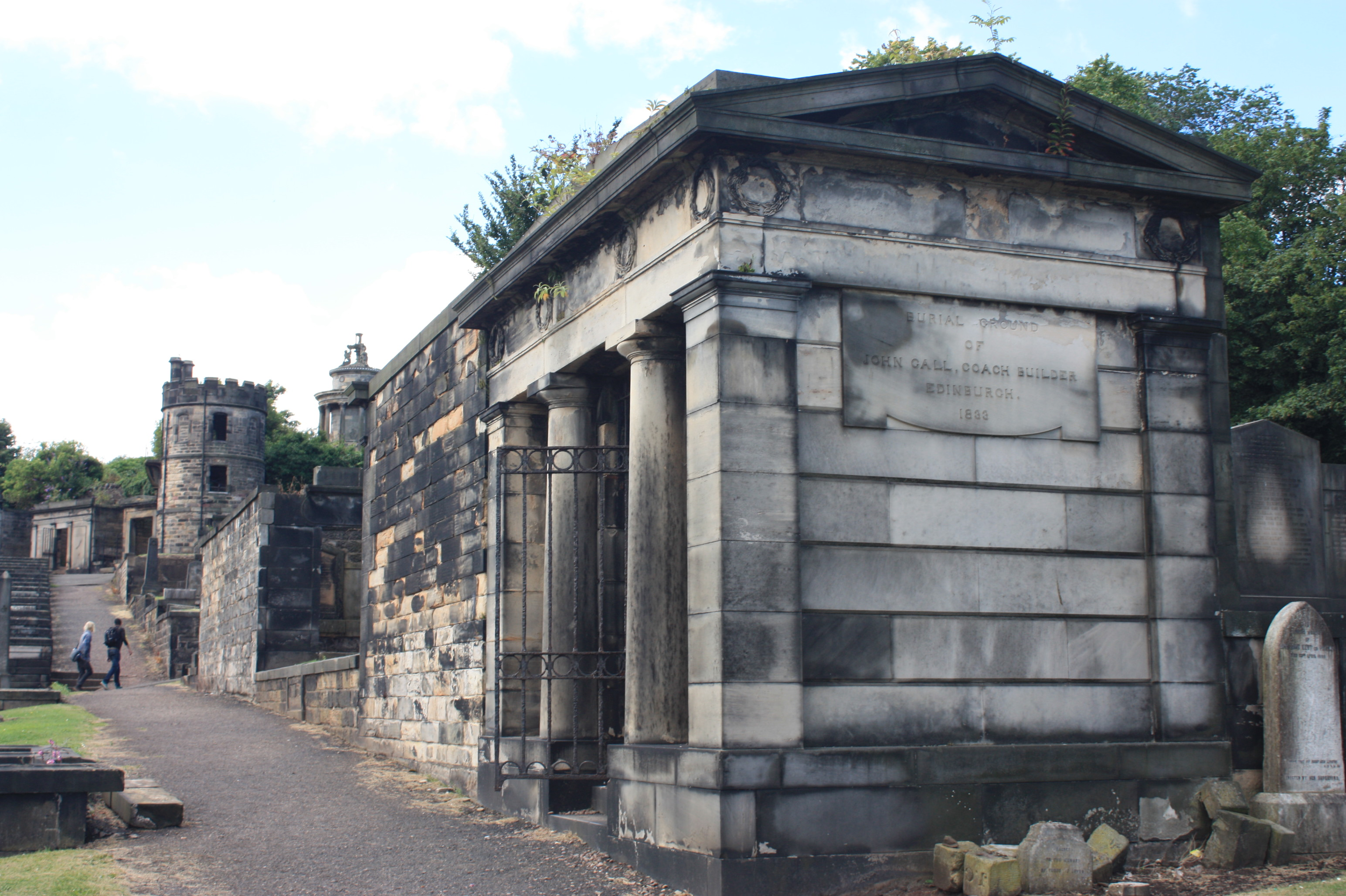
John Gall's vault, New Calton Cemetery, looking towards the watchtower

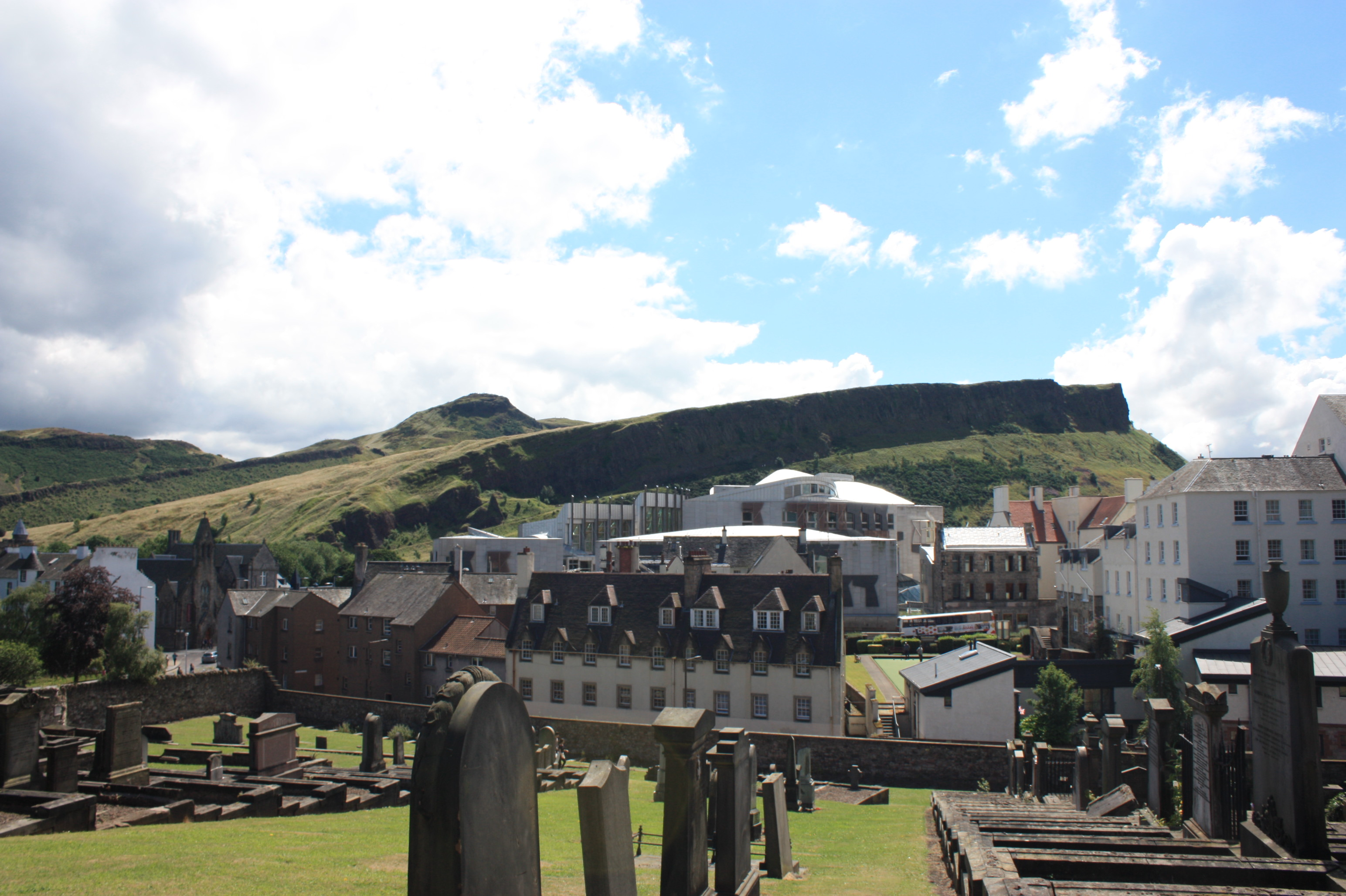
New Calton Cemetery looking to Arthur's Seat and Holyrood Palace

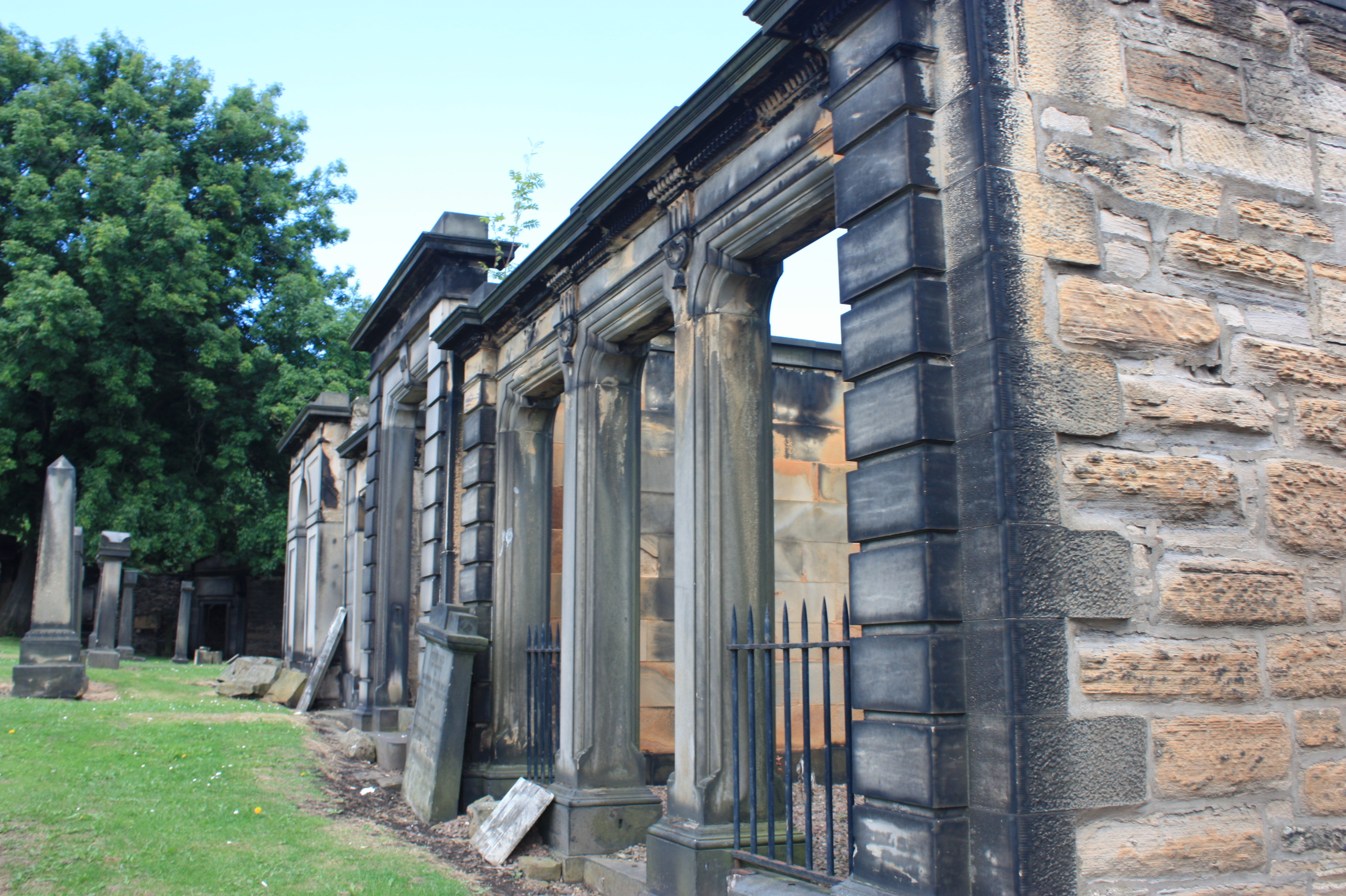
Lord Glencorse's vault New Calton Cemetery

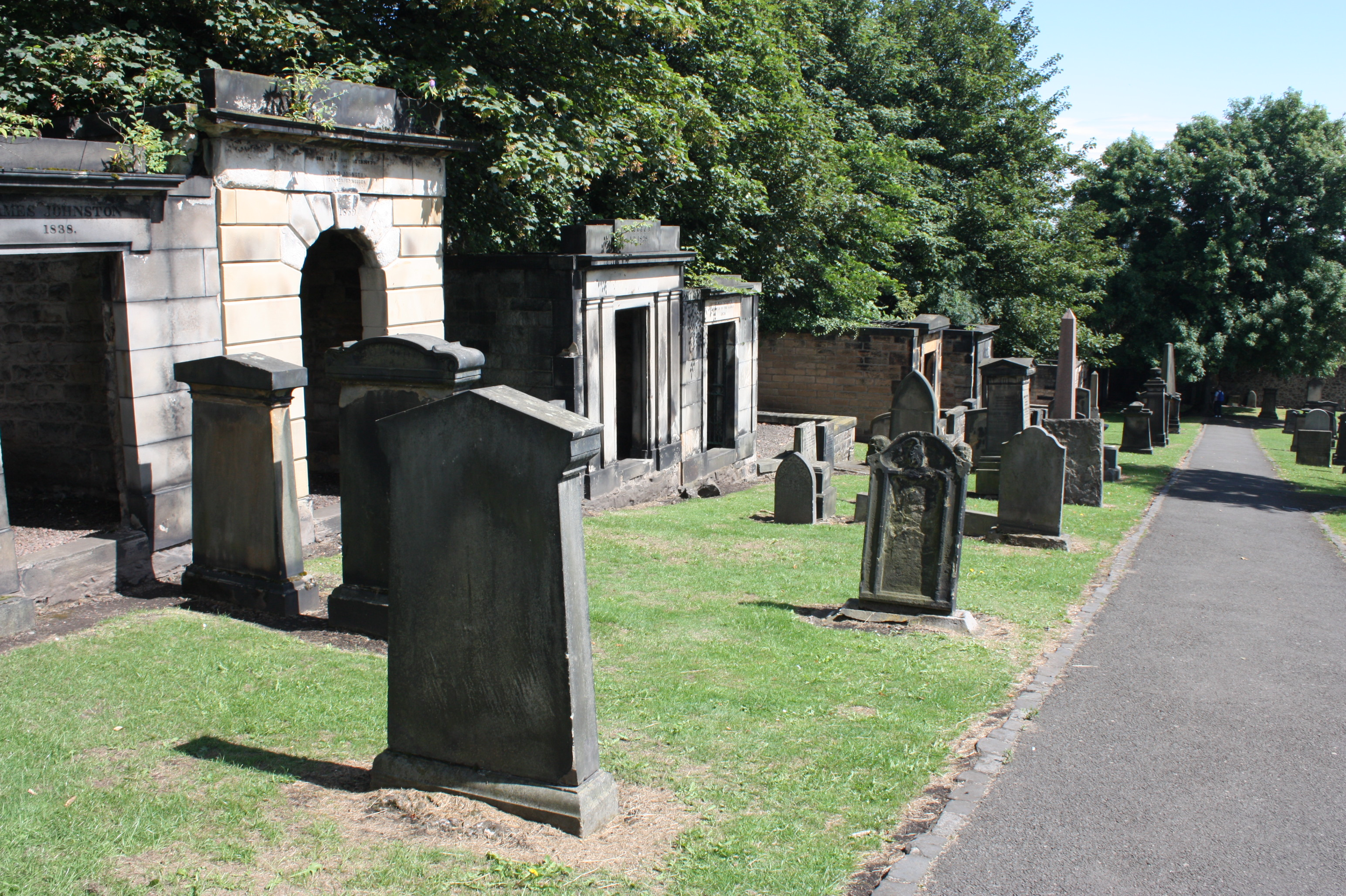
The north section of New Calton Cemetery containing re-interments from Old Calton Cemetery

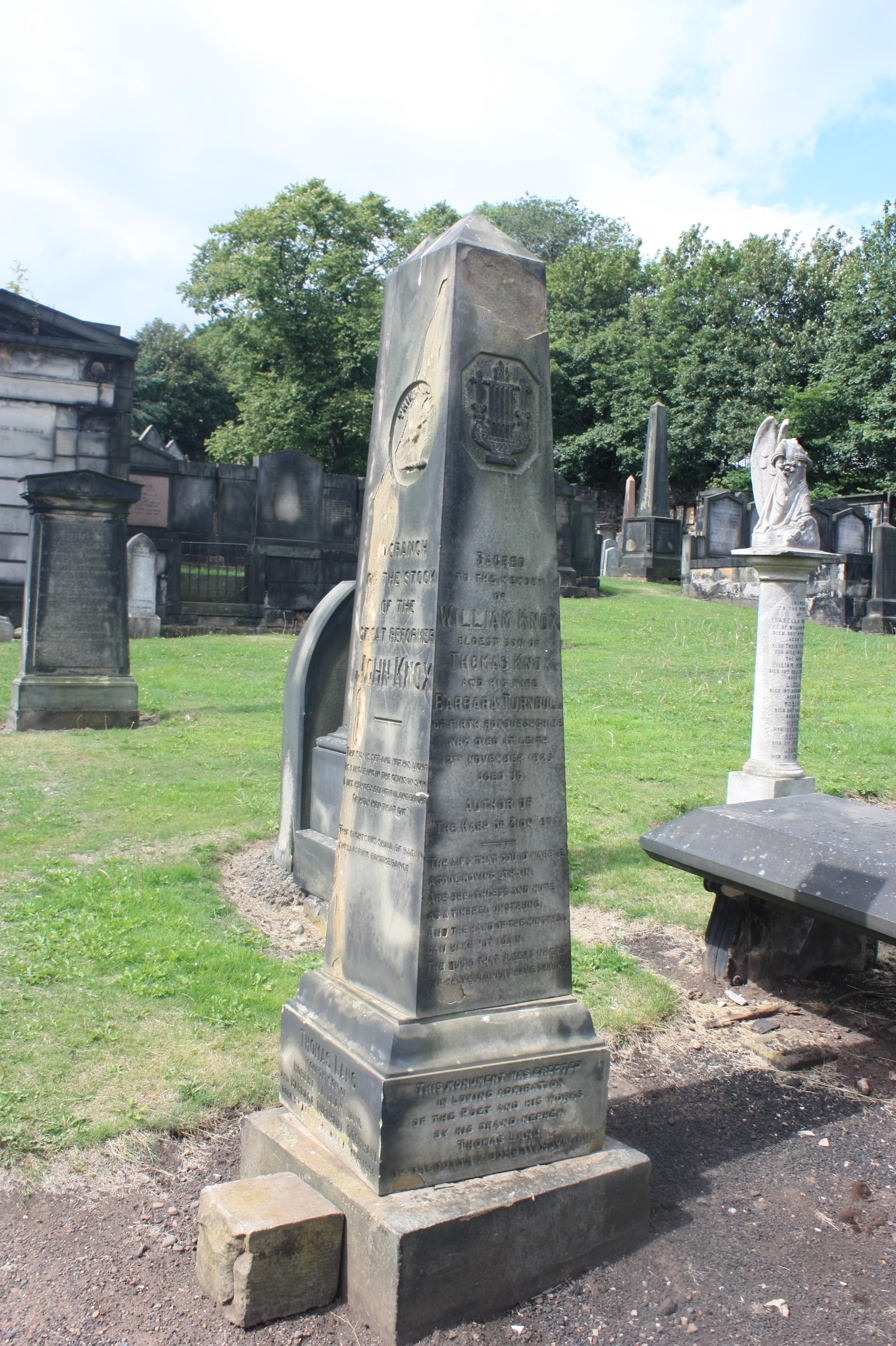
William Knox's tombstone in the upper east section of the New Calton Cemetery

It was initially necessitated by the construction of Waterloo Place, which had cut through the Old Calton Burial Ground, requiring an immediate re-interment of the bodies affected. This major engineering exercise took from 1817 to 1820 to complete. Bodies were carefully identified and moved, with their corresponding gravestone, if existing, to the new cemetery. Due to this fairly unusual circumstance a number of stones predate the cemetery but are indeed true markers of those interred. The new cemetery was made far larger than needed simply for the required reburials, and indeed exceeds the area of the entire space occupied by Old Calton Burial Ground as it was seen as a convenient and more open way of accommodating the growing number of dead caused by Edinburgh’s major expansion of the early 19th century.

Both the Old and New Calton burial grounds are not private cemeteries rather they were the parish burial grounds for the Caltonians who worshiped in Leith, being on the outer most edge of the parish it was considered too far to take their deceased for burial in Leith.

The design task of driving the cut through Old Calton Burial Ground to create Regent Bridge and Waterloo Place was undertaken by Archibald Elliot who died shortly thereafter and is buried in New Calton Burial Ground. The New Calton Burial Ground was laid out by Thomas Bonnar and the design was refined and completed by Thomas Brown.

The first recorded interment (as opposed to re-interment) is noted on a vault on the north wall, and relates to John Fyfe who died on 27 February 1817 and was buried in the newly constructed vault of his father, Andrew Fyfe, approximately midway along the north wall.

It was "opened to the public" in 1820. The period prior to this would have included the long process of carefully reburying up to 300 persons. It would not be appropriate to have visited during this period.

== Layout ==
The task of laying out the new burial ground is believed to have been undertaken by Thomas Brown, Superintendent of Works for the city at that time.

The older stones all lie on the north-most edge of the cemetery. In some cases entire vaults are rebuilt.

The layout is generally rectilinear, and is laid out in a series of east–west terraces stepping down the hill.

== Watch-tower ==
A watch-tower was built at its upper corner, near the entrance, to protect against graverobbing.

The tower was occupied as a house from the mid 19th century until around 1955. Despite being tiny (around 5m diameter internally) it is said to have accommodated a family of ten at one time: parents sleeping on the central floor (the livingroom), daughters on the top floor, sons on the lower floor. Adjacent empty plots were utilised as garden ground to grow vegetables. The remnant rhubarb patch was still extant until the mid1980s.

The story that David Bryce lived here is highly unlikely to be true given his status and is more likely a confusion to his being buried here (see below).

== Current condition (2014-present) ==
While the ground is well maintained in terms of grass-cutting, many stones are broken or vandalised plus many have been laid flat "for safety reasons" by the local authority.

In June 2019, tombs and monuments in the ground were defaced in Swastikas and offensive terms.

== Notable persons interred ==
- Rev George Husband Baird (1761–1840) principal of the University of Edinburgh
- Dr James Begbie (1798–1869)
- Rear Admiral James Bisset (1760-1824) (grave location unclear)
- James Boyd (schoolmaster) (1795–1856)
- Dr John Brown author (1810–1882)
- David Bryce, architect (1803–1876)
- Alexander Bryson scientist (1816–1866)
- Sir Alexander Christison (1828–1918)
- David Christison (1830-1912) physician and archaeologist
- Robert Christison toxicologist (1797–1882)
- Croall family plot
- Professor L. B. C. Cunningham FRSE (1895-1946) physicist inventor of the gyro gunsight used in the Spitfire
- William Dick (1793–1866) renowned vet and founder of the Dick Vet College in Edinburgh
- Archibald Elliot, architect (1760–1823)
- William Fowler (architect) (1824–1906)
- Rear Admiral Alexander Fraser (1747–1829)
- Vice Admiral Thomas Fraser (1796–1870) son of the above
- Andrew Fyfe (1792–1862) chemist
- Dr John Gairdner (1790-1876) physician
- Admiral John Graham (1791–1854)
- Very Rev John Inglis (1762-1834) Moderator of the General Assembly of the Church of Scotland and his son,
- John Inglis, Lord Glencorse politician and judge (1810–1891)
- James Ivory, Lord Ivory judge (1792–1866)
- William Knox (1789–1825) Abraham Lincoln's favourite poet
- David Laing (antiquary) (1793-1868) bookseller and librarian
- William MacGillivray naturalist (1796–1852) (grave vandalised)
- Alexander Kincaid Mackenzie (1768-1830) Lord Provost of Edinburgh 1817 to 1819
- John McLeod (artist) (1812-1872)
- Sir William Miller, Lord Glenlee (1755-1846)
- John Moir (physician) (1808–1899) (grave location unclear)
- David Ness (sculptor) (1786–1852)
- Simon Taylor Ogilvie (1792-1875) Commander in the Royal Navy
- Admiral David Peat (1793-1879) - memorial only, buried in Markinch
- Robert Pitcairn (antiquary) (1793–1855)
- General Roger Hale Sheaffe (1763–1851)
- Andrew Skene FRSE (1784–1835) Solicitor General for Scotland in 1834 (A fine marble monument carved by Patric Park)
- Rear Admiral Andrew Smith (d. 1831)
- Alan Stevenson, lighthouse engineer (1807–1865)
- Robert Stevenson (civil engineer) father to Alan and Thomas (1772–1850)
- Thomas Stevenson’ lighthouse engineer, father of Robert Louis Stevenson (1818–1887)
- Rev Dr Charles Richard Teape (1830-1905) Chaplain to the Bishop of Edinburgh (location unclear)
- Rt Rev Charles Terrot (1790–1872), Bishop of Edinburgh
- John Thin (architect) (1764–1827)
- John Yule (1762-1827), botanist

Other graves of note include:

The Commonwealth War Grave to five merchant navy seamen "known unto God" whose bodies were recovered from the sea following an attack on the MV Atheltemplar on 1 March 1941 during World War II. In addition, the cemetery also contains four war graves from World War I, of a British Army soldier and officer and a Royal Air Force officer and aircraftsman.

The well-built Georgian style vault in the centre to David Gall, of Gall & Thomson (coachbuilders at 17 Greenside Place) is of note.

The carvings in the vault of Andrew Grierson (d. 1847) near the north-east corner.

== Trivia ==
Although there is some reference to the burial ground being called "The Cemetery of the Admirals", this appears both rare and misplaced as the burial ground has fewer admirals than most Edinburgh cemeteries, with only three named on monuments and an alleged further three unmarked. A high number of the gravestones moved from Old Calton Cemetery are noted as "tanners" and "leather workers" connecting to that area’s association with shoemaking.
