= John Strachan (bishop of Brechin) =

The Right Reverend John Strachan
- Bishop of Brechin
- Church: Scottish Episcopal Church
- Diocese: Brechin
- In office: 1788-1810
- Predecessor: Abernethy Drummond
- Successor: George Gleig

Orders
- Consecration: 26 September 1787 by Robert Kilgour

Personal details
- Died: 1810
- Denomination: Anglican

Styles of John Strachan
- Reference style: The Right Reverend
- Spoken style: My Lord or Bishop

John Strachan (died 1810) was an Anglican clergyman who served in the Scottish Episcopal Church as the Bishop of Brechin from 1788 to 1810.

== Biography ==
He was consecrated the Coadjutor Bishop of the Diocese of Brechin at Peterhead on 26 September 1787 by Primus Kilgour and bishops Keith and Macfarlane. He succeeded as the Diocesan Bishop of Brechin in 1788. He died in office in 1810.

Scottish Episcopal Church titles
Preceded by Abernethy Drummond	Bishop of Brechin; 1788–1810	Succeeded by George Gleig
