= William Knox (Scottish poet) =

Scottish poet

William Knox (17 August 1789 – 12 November 1825) was a Scottish poet. He is known for writing Abraham Lincoln's favourite poem, Mortality (O, Why Should The Spirit Of Mortal Be Proud?), which Lincoln often recited by memory.

== Life ==
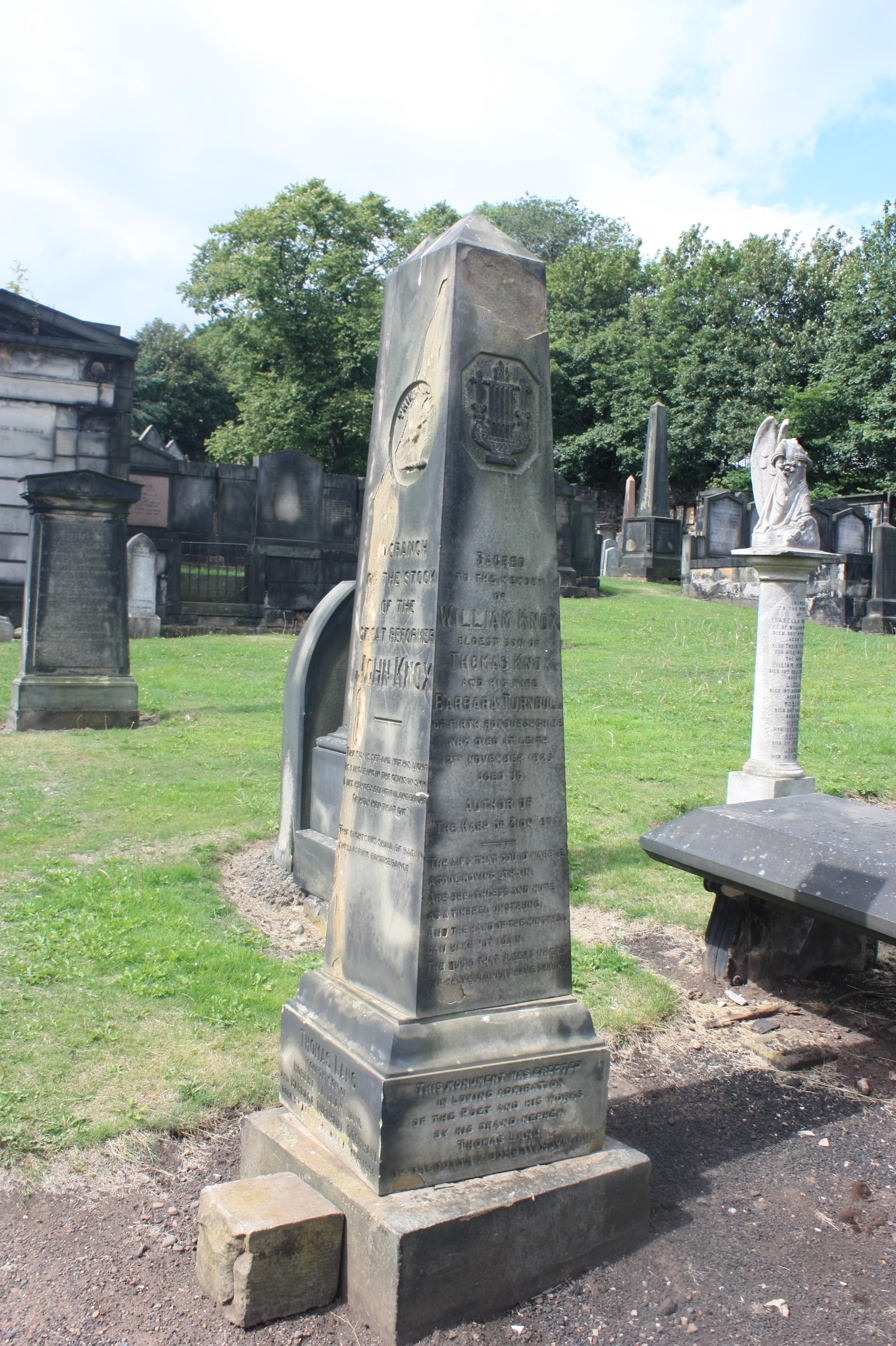
William Knox's tombstone, New Calton Cemetery

=== Early life and agricultural career ===
William Knox was born on 17 August 1789 in the small estate of Firth, in the parish of Lilliesleaf, in the county of Roxburghshire, in southern Scotland. He was the eldest child (of three sons and three daughters) of Thomas Knox, an agricultural and pastoral farmer in Roxburghshire and the neighbouring Selkirkshire, and Barbara Turnbull, the eldest daughter of Walter Turnbull, Esquire of Firth. He was educated first in the parish school of Lilliesleaf (to age 14), then in Musselburgh Grammar School. The Knox family lived in a farm (Todrig) which his mother had inherited when her first husband, also a farmer, died.

From an early age William was considered to have powers of acute observation and steady attention, and a mind keen, active and susceptible of deep impressions. He also had a peculiarly retentive memory. By age 14, he was a good English scholar with a considerable knowledge of Latin. He was also passionately fond of music and liked to draw. At an early age William started writing songs and other poetical pieces, humorous and satirical, chiefly in the Scottish dialect. After his return from Musselburgh to Firth to assist his father, poetry became more than just an amusement for him.

In 1812 he leased the farm of Wrae, near Langholm, Dumfriesshire, and farmed unsuccessfully - mainly due to the lack of a capital needed to render the farm sufficiently productive - from 1812 to 1817; then he turned to writing poems, encouraged by both Christopher North and Sir Walter Scott.

Despite having farmed for only five years, he earned the approbation of the intelligent agriculturists in Dumfriesshire, who considered Knox as a man well fitted to excel as a farmer. He was greatly esteemed and highly praised by all of his neighbours: for his generosity as a man and for his worth as a friend. During his farming years, Knox never lost his interest in poetry and literature. By 1817 - when he ceased farming - William was deeply read in the British poets, both ancient and contemporary. In 1817 he composed the greater number of the pieces contained in his first work, The Lonely Hearth and other Poems. By that time he also had become a good literary critic, not only of poetry but also of other English literature, and had exercised his talents in different styles of composition. At about that time, he wrote unpublished poems entitled The Influence of Love over the other Passions and The Father's Cottage.

=== Later life ===
He wrote several books of poetry: The Lonely Hearth (1818); The Songs of Israel (1824), which contains Mortality (O, Why Should The Spirit Of Mortal Be Proud?); The Harp of Zion (1825); and latterly was a journalist in Edinburgh.

Both Sir Walter Scott and Professor John Wilson (Christopher North) of Edinburgh, had a high opinion of Knox as a man and as a poet with "fascinating conversational powers and general literary information". In the year 1820 Knox moved to Edinburgh. From then until shortly before his death many of his small works of prose and verse appeared in various periodicals. He was a frequent contributor to the Literary Gazette. He wrote a Christmas tale entitled Marianne or the Widower's Daughter and also A Visit to Dublin.

At the beginning of 1823 he visited his brother Walter in Ireland, and remained there for about twelve months. During that visit he composed The Songs of Israel, published soon after his return to Edinburgh in 1824. His next and last publication was The Harp of Zion, published in April 1825 and written only a few months before its publication.

The memory of William Knox was so powerful that once, when a bookseller mislaid the manuscript of The Harp of Zion, he is said to have sat down and in two or three days re-written the whole poem from his recollection (the only trouble it cost him being the manual labour). He scarcely ever altered the first draft of his compositions, as he believed that the first draft was generally the best.

Robert Southey, a Romantic English poet and Poet Laureate from 1813 until 1843, wrote to Knox on 19 August 1824:

“Your little volume has been safely delivered to me by your friend Mr G. Macdonald, and I thank you for it. It has given me great pleasure. To paraphrase sacred poetry is the most difficult of all tasks, and it appears to me that you have been more successful in the attempt than any of your predecessors. You may probably have heard that the Bishop of Calcutta ... was engaged in forming a collection of hymns and sacred pieces, with the hope of having them introduced into our English churches. Some of yours are so well adapted to that object that I will send out a copy of your book to him. … I cannot but wish that talents and feelings such as yours were employed in the ministry of the gospel, where you would find your happiness in the performance of your duty – you are young enough to think of this.”

William Knox suffered a stroke, and died three or four days later in Edinburgh on 12 November 1825. He is buried in the New Calton Cemetery in its upper east section.

== O, Why Should The Spirit Of Mortal Be Proud? ==
O, Why Should The Spirit Of Mortal Be Proud?

O, why should the spirit of mortal be proud?
Like a swift-fleeting meteor, a fast-flying cloud,
A flash of the lightning, a break of the wave,
Man passes from life to his rest in the grave.

The hand of the king that the scepter hath borne;
The brow of the priest that the mitre hath worn;
The eye of the sage and the heart of the brave,
Are hidden and lost in the depth of the grave.

The saint who enjoyed the communion of heaven,
The sinner who dared to remain unforgiven,
The wise and the foolish, the guilty and just,
Have quietly mingled their bones in the dust.

For we are the same our fathers have been;
We see the same sights our fathers have seen, —
We drink the same stream and view the same sun,
And run the same course our fathers have run.

They loved, but the story we cannot unfold;
They scorned, but the heart of the haughty is cold;
They grieved, but no wail from their slumbers will come;
They joyed, but the tongue of their gladness is dumb.

'T is the wink of an eye, 't is the draught of a breath,
From the blossom of health to the paleness of death,
From the gilded saloon to the bier and the shroud, —
O, why should the spirit of mortal be proud?

— From the "O, Why Should The Spirit Of Mortal
Be Proud?" poem by William Knox

The poem “O, Why Should The Spirit Of Mortal Be Proud?” was a particular favorite of Abraham Lincoln. American painter F. B. Carpenter wrote that while he was engaged in painting his large picture at the White House, he was alone one evening with the president in his room when President Lincoln said:

"There is a poem, which has been a great favorite with me for years, which was first shown to me when a young man, by a friend, and which I afterwards saw and cut from a newspaper, and learned by heart. I would,” he continued, “give a great deal to know who wrote it, but I have never been able to ascertain.”
