= Alexander Fraser (Royal Navy officer) =

Royal Navy officer

Vice-Admiral Alexander Fraser
- Born: 1747; Lerwick, Shetland Isles
- Died: 29 December 1829 (aged 81–82); Sandwick, Shetland Isles
- Military career
- Allegiance: Great Britain; United Kingdom
- Branch: Royal Navy
- Service years: 1761-1829
- Rank: Vice-Admiral of the Red
- Commands: HMS San Carlos; HMS Tisiphone; HMS Savage; HMS Redoubt; HMS Proserpine; HMS Shannon; HMS Diana; HMS Berschermer; HMS Amphion; HMS Weymouth; HMS Hindostan; HMS Prince; HMS Vanguard
- Conflicts: American War of Independence: Battle of Long Island; French Revolutionary Wars; Napoleonic Wars: Second Battle of Copenhagen

Vice-Admiral Alexander Fraser (1747–29 December 1829) was a Royal Navy officer who served in the American War of Independence and French Revolutionary and Napoleonic Wars. He was responsible for the landing parties in the Battle of Long Island, captured several privateers and took place in the Second Battle of Copenhagen.

== Life ==
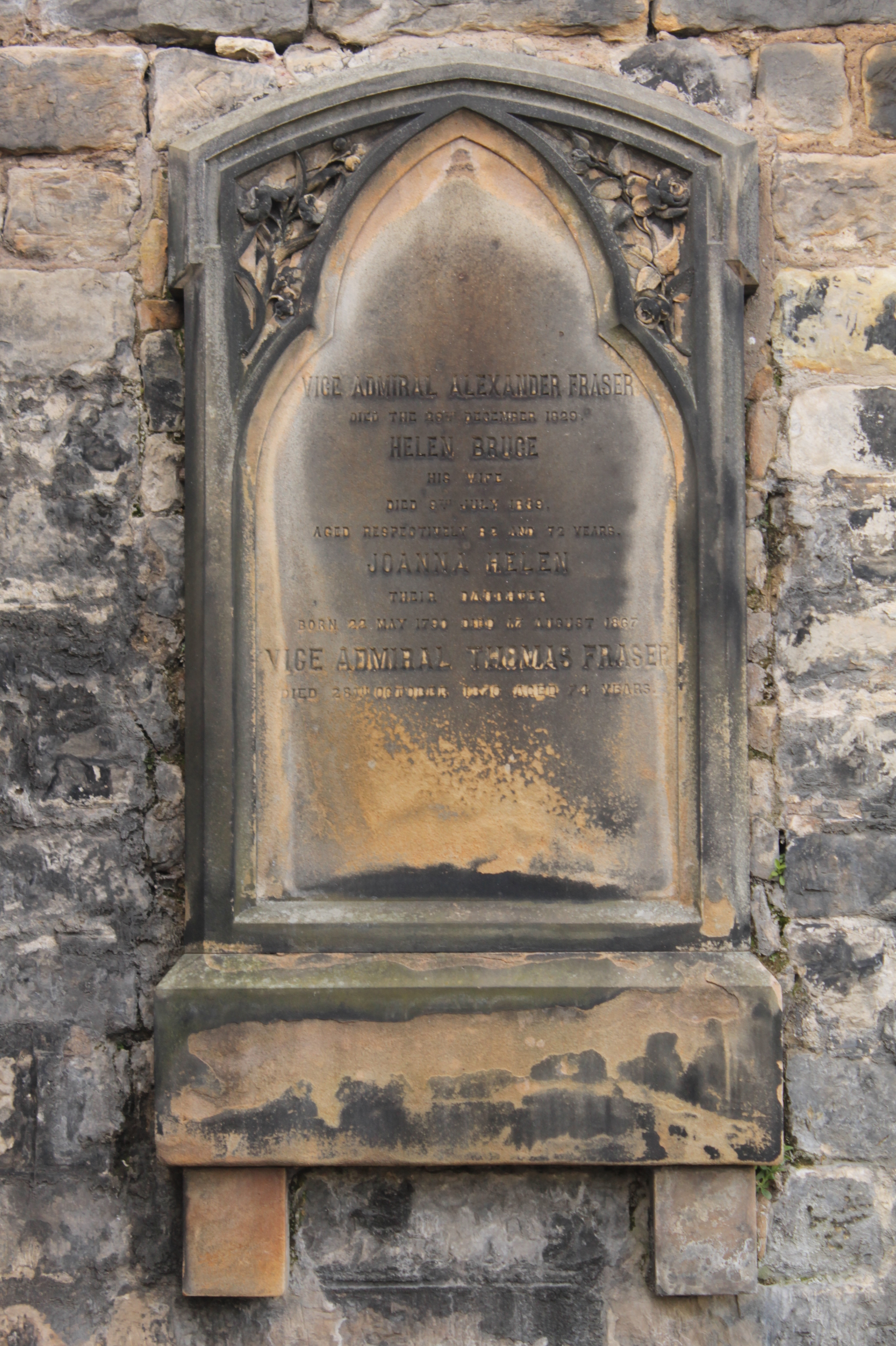
The grave of Admiral Fraser, New Calton Cemetery

He was born in Lerwick on the Shetland Isles the son of Hugh Fraser, an exciseman, and his wife, Jane Linning.

He joined the Royal Navy as a boy in 1761 serving on the 10-gunner cutter HMS Fly under George Gayton. He was present at the Capture of Belle Ile later that year. The ship then served in the Basque Roads. In 1763 he left the Navy for some years to improve his education (this was probably at Edinburgh University). In 1768 he re-joined the Navy on HMS Mermaid as a midshipman and served off the coast of North America for three years. There he was given acting command of the sloop HMS Bonetta to sail her back to England, arriving August 1772.

He sat a lieutenant's exam and joined the 74-gun ship of the line HMS Royal Oak in March 1773 under Captain George Balfour. He was part of the naval review by George III at Spithead. In 1774 he moved as acting lieutenant to the frigate HMS Scarborough under Captain Andrew Barkley again off the coast of North America. By 1775, he was serving on the sloop HMS Canceaux, based on the Piscataqua River. He formed part of a landing party at Falmouth, Massachusetts to demand the surrender of the American rebels. When this was denied they bombarded the town and set fire to it.

He next moved to the ship of the line HMS Chatham under Captain John Raynor and was part of Admiral Molyneux Shuldham's attack and occupation of Long Island. Fraser was given the important duty in this of commanding the smaller boats for the invasion of the island. He was commissioned as an officer in the Royal Navy as a lieutenant in July 1777. In February 1781 he took command of the post ship HMS San Carlos, a Spanish ship which had been captured in December 1779. This two-month command appears simply to transfer from one dockyard to another.

Fraser reappears after a period of leave in December 1787 as a commander in command of the fire ship HMS Tisiphone based at Woolwich Dockyard. In September 1790 he took command of the sloop HMS Savage again based in Woolwich Dockyard but also patrolling in the North Sea. In February 1793 he captured the French 8-gun ship La Custine.

On 1 July 1793 he was promoted to post captain and given command of the 20-gun floating battery HMS Redoubt based at Woolwich. In July 1794 he took over the frigate HMS Proserpine based in Jamaica and in February 1796 took command of the newly completed 32-gun frigate HMS Shannon based in the English Channel, which he left in 1799. Shannon captured three French privateers off the coast of France and one off the coast of Ireland while under his command.

In March 1799 he took over the frigate HMS Diana based in the West Indies and captured the French privateer La Medie.

From July 1801 until April 1803 he commanded the ship of the line HMS Beschermer, a captured Dutch ship put to use as a floating battery.

From May to September 1802 he commanded the frigate HMS Amphion. He was briefly charged with the frigate HMS Weymouth as its commissioning captain in 1804. He was also commissioning captain for the ship of the line HMS Hindostan but stayed with her somewhat longer including being involved in the engagement of the ship of the line HMS Tremendous against the French ship Canonniere off the coast of South Africa in April 1806.

In December 1806 he took over command of the 98-gun ship of the line HMS Prince.

From February 1807 to February 1808 he was in command of the ship of the line HMS Vanguard in which he was based at Plymouth but also served at the Second Battle of Copenhagen on 15 August 1807. Vanguard was refitted as a prison ship under his command, holding a number of French prisoners.

Fraser retired in June 1814 having been promoted to the rank of rear-admiral of the red.

He died on 29 December 1829 at Sandlodge near Sandwick in the Shetland Isles but is buried in New Calton Burial Ground in central Edinburgh. He seems to have had no link to Edinburgh but the grave has a pleasant view over the Firth of Forth looking to the North Sea and this may be the sole reason for burial here.

== Family ==
In April 1788 he married Helen (Nellie) Bruce of Sumburgh in Shetland. They had two daughters and three sons, including:

- Alexander Fraser (b.1788) served in the Royal Engineers.
- Joanna Helen Fraser (1790–1867).
- John Fraser (b.1791) joined the Royal Navy and was drowned during his service on the sloop HMS Magnet which sank en route to Halifax in October 1812 with all hands.
- Thomas Fraser (1796–1870) also joined the Royal Navy and rose to become a vice-admiral. He died at 19 Brighton Place in Portobello, Edinburgh. He is buried close to his father.
