= Andy McFarlane (cricketer) =

Irish cricketer

Personal information
- Full name: Andrew McFarlane
- Born: 21 June 1899; Sion Mills, United Kingdom
- Died: 14 June 1972 (aged 72); Derry, Northern Ireland
- Batting: Right-handed
- Bowling: Right-arm off break

Domestic team information
- Years: Team
- 1937: Ireland

Career statistics
Competition	First-class
Matches	1
Runs scored	23
Batting average	11.50
100s/50s	–/–
Top score	23
Catches/stumpings	1/–
- Source: Cricinfo, 24 October 2011

Andrew McFarlane (21 June 1899 – 14 June 1972) was an Irish cricketer. McFarlane was a right-handed batsman who bowled right-arm off break. He was born at Sion Mills, United Kingdom (today Northern Ireland). He was educated at the Sion Mills Public Elementary School.

Following success in club cricket, McFarlane was selected to play in Ireland's first-class match against Scotland in 1937 at Ormeau, Belfast. Batting at number six, he was dismissed for a duck by John Farquhar in the Irish first-innings. In their second-innings he scored 21 runs before being dismissed by Sandy Paris. This was his only major appearance for Ireland.

Outside of cricket he was employed as a textile worker. He died at Derry, Northern Ireland on 14 June 1972.
