= Thomas Fraser (Royal Navy officer) =

British Royal Navy officer (1796–1870)

Vice-Admiral Thomas Fraser (1796–1870) was a Royal Navy officer serving in the mid 19th century. He was an important contributor to British victories in the First Anglo-Burmese War.

== Life ==
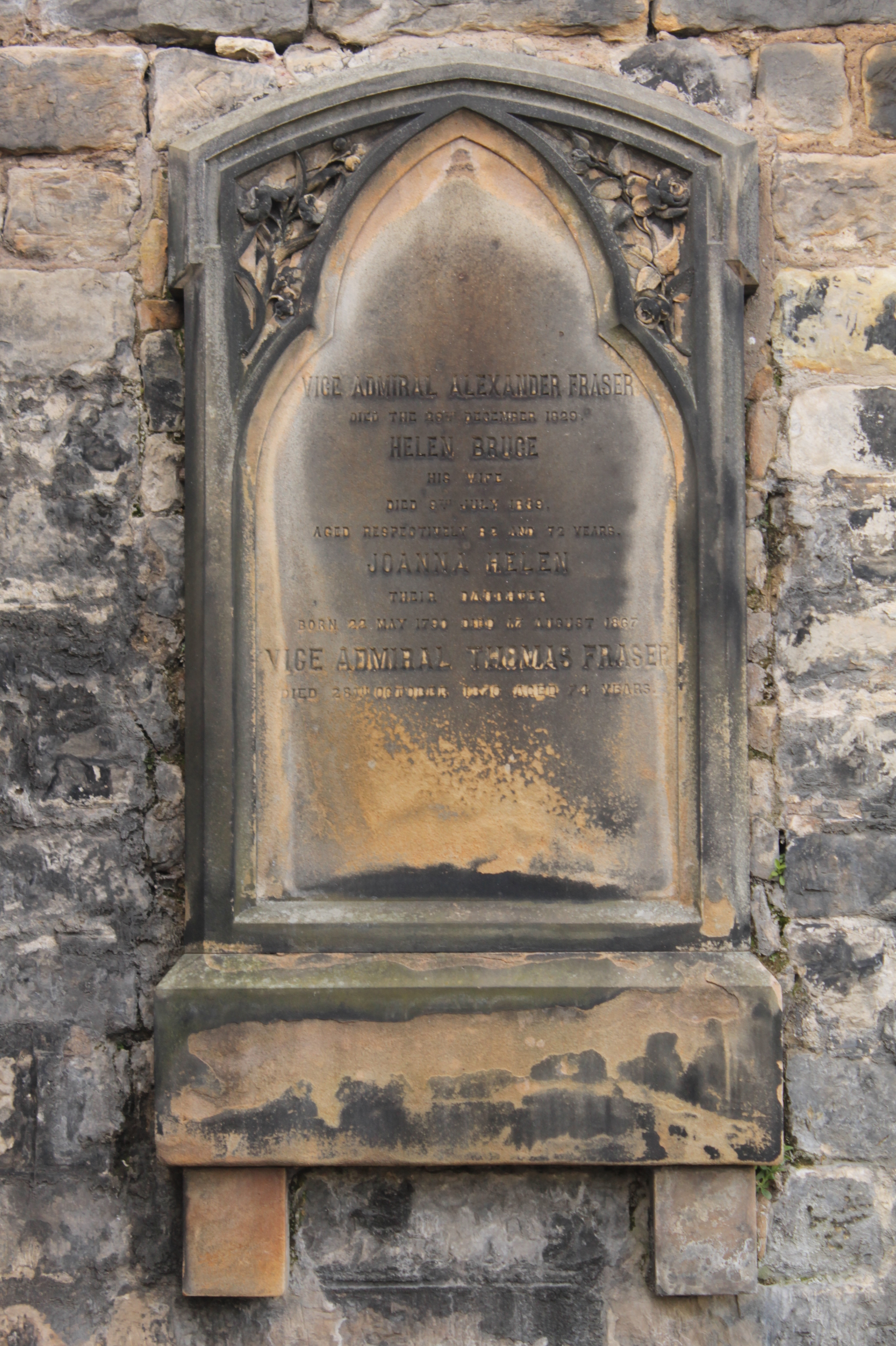
The grave of Admiral Fraser, New Calton Cemetery

He was born in England (probably Portsmouth) in May 1796. He is a son of Rear Admiral Alexander Fraser and his wife, Helen Bruce, both Shetlanders.

He entered the Royal Navy College in February 1809. He was serving as a midshipman on HMS Leander under Captain Edward Chetham and was present at the Battle of Algiers in August 1816. A month later he was promoted to Lieutenant and moved to the much smaller HMS Scout under Captain William Ramsden based in the Mediterranean. In March 1823 he was placed on HMS Larne under Captain Frederick Marryat on a trip to the East Indies. There in May 1824 he caught "jungle fever" on an expedition to resolve water supply to Rangoon with a fleet assembled at Port Cornwallis on the Great Andaman Island.

In June 1824 still on HMS Larne he took part in a skirmish en route from Rangoon to Kemmendine and showed great gallantry and on 10th commanded a small fleet against native attacks. On 8 July he commanded HMS Satellite accompanied by a body of troops under Sir Archibald Campbell on a trip inland on the Yangon River. Three other armed vessels, HMS Teignmouth, HMS Thetis and HMS Jessey were also under Fraser's overall command on this journey. and attacked inland stockades acting on behalf of the East India Company. On 8 August a parallel attack was made on stockades on the Dalla River. He made a second attack on the Dalla River on 2 September accompanied by Captain Marryat. The 400 troops taken on this mission were under command of Major R L Evans. By mid September the crew of the Larne were heavily affected by scurvy and Marryat ordered the ship to Penang for recovery. The ship and crew ultimately went to Calcutta to recover, returning to the conflict area on 24 December.

On 11 January 1825 Fraser led an attack on Syriam and on 6 February accompanied Captain Henry Ducie Chads on an attack on Than-ta-bain. On 17 Feb he sailed the Larne accompanied by the East Indiaman Mercury and the transporter Argyle with 780 troops under Major Robert Sale and attacked Bassein on the Irrawaddy River. On 26 March 1825 he was posted to protect Naputtah. From there an attack was made on Thingang a Burmese stronghold a few miles upriver. 150 prisoners were taken in this attack. On 30 March he attacked Pumkayi.

In 1826 he was promoted to commander taking over the East Indiaman Athol at Trincomalee.

He was commander of HMS Sappho from 1837 to 1841 (its first commander)

He was promoted to Captain in 1841.

He retired in 1862 at the rank of Rear Admiral and was further upgraded to Vice Admiral in 1867.

In retiral he lived at 19 Brighton Place, a modest flat in Portobello, Edinburgh.

He died on 28 October 1870 and is buried in New Calton Burial Ground in central Edinburgh with his parents.

== Family ==
Thomas never married and had no children.

His brother John Fraser was also in the Royal Navy and drowned on the loss of HMS Magnet in 1812.
