= William Skinner (bishop) =

Scottish bishop

The Most Reverend William Skinner
- Bishop of Aberdeen; Primus of the Scottish Episcopal Church
- Church: Scottish Episcopal Church
- Diocese: Aberdeen
- In office: 1816-1857
- Predecessor: John Skinner
- Successor: Thomas Suther
- Other post: Primus of the Scottish Episcopal Church (1841–1857)

Orders
- Ordination: 1802 by Samuel Horsley
- Consecration: 27 October 1816 by George Gleig

Personal details
- Born: 24 October 1778 Aberdeen, Aberdeenshire, Scotland
- Died: 17 April 1857 (aged 78) Aberdeen, Aberdeenshire, Scotland
- Denomination: Anglican
- Parents: John Skinner & Mary Robertson
- Children: 1

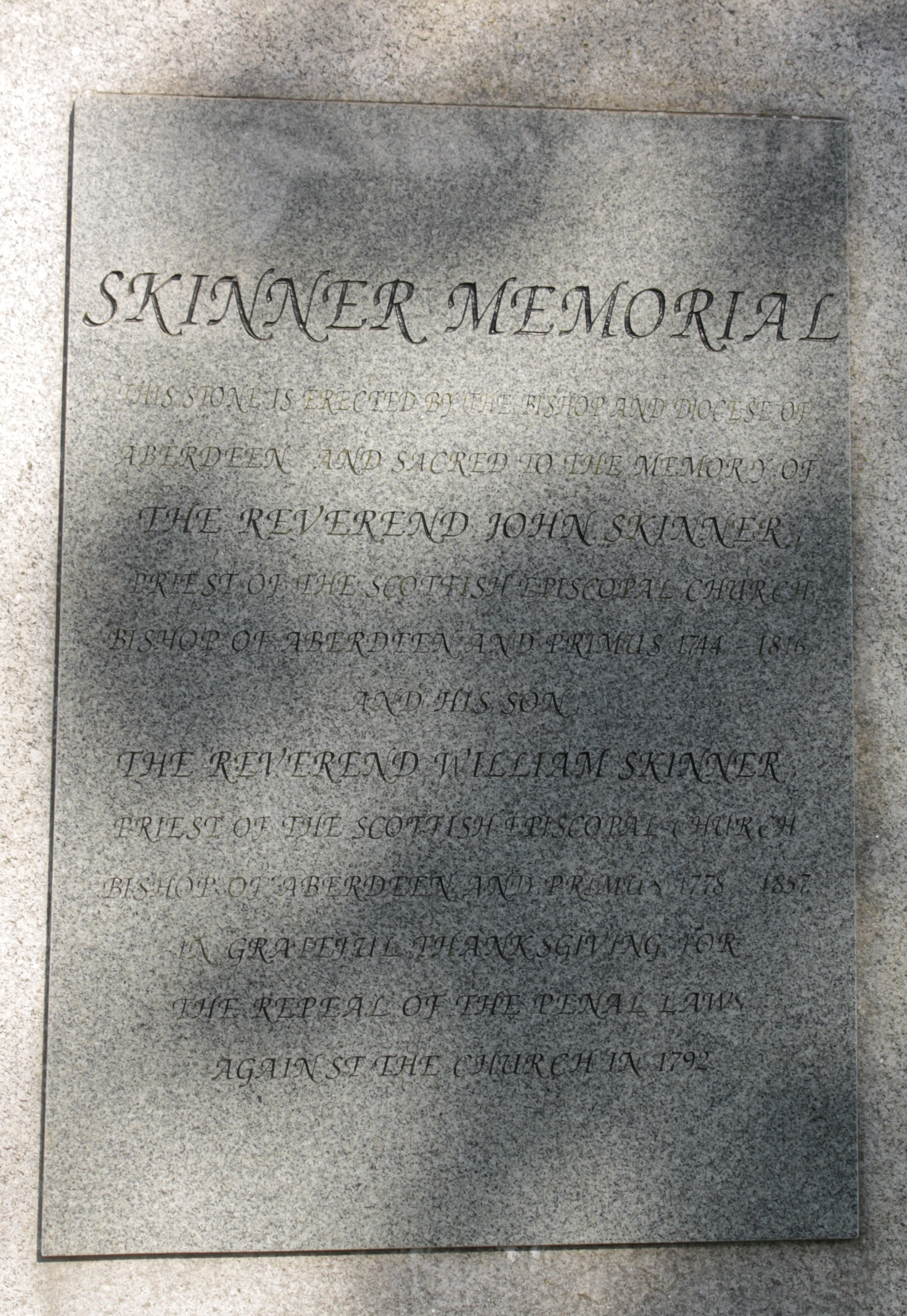
Skinner memorial, St Peters Cemetery, Old Aberdeen

William Skinner (24 October 1778 – 17 April 1857), was bishop of Aberdeen in the Scottish Episcopal Church.

== Biography ==
Skinner, second son of John Skinner (1744–1816), bishop of St. Andrews, was born at Aberdeen on 24 October 1778, and educated at Marischal College, University of Aberdeen and at Oxford, where he matriculated from Wadham College on 3 March 1798, graduating B.A. in 1801, and M.A., B.D., and D.D. in 1819. William Stevens, the friend of Bishop Horne, and Jones of Nayland defrayed part of his university expenses. If Stevens had not done this, John Skinner would not have been financially able to send his son William to Oxford. Having William attend Oxford was important to him as a way of showing "his own personal conviction of the full communion which existed between the English and Scottish Churches."

=== Ordination & consecration ===
Skinner was ordained by Bishop Samuel Horsley of St. Asaph's in March 1802. Returning to Scotland, he officiated as assistant, and afterwards as colleague, to his father in the incumbency of St. Andrew's Church, Aberdeen. On 11 September 1816 he was elected by the clergy of the diocese as successor to his father in the see of Aberdeen, and was consecrated at Stirling on 27 October 1816. The consecraters were the Primus and the Bishops of Edinburgh, Dunkeld, and Murray." George Gleig, primus of the church, sent a severe but fruitless reproof to the dean and clergy of Aberdeen for electing the son of their late bishop.

=== Elected primus ===
Skinner was one of the bishops who attended the synod held at Laurencekirk on 18 June 1828 to revise the canons of 1811; thirty canons were adopted and duly signed on 20 June. In 1832 he confirmed as many as four hundred and sixty-two persons, and a first effort was made in the same year to circulate religious works in the Gaelic language. On 29 August 1838 he attended another synod held in St. Paul's Church, Edinburgh, when the canons were again revised. Upon the death of Bishop James Walker, Skinner was unanimously elected primus by an episcopal synod held in St. Andrew's Church, Aberdeen, on 2 June 1841. Both as bishop and "as senior Episcopalian bishop in Scotland," Skinner worked to consolidate the "Scottish Episcopal Church as a serious religious presence" in Scotland. This effort included having "the church's documents translated into Scottish Gaelic." He also "oversaw the establishment of Glenalmond College, near Perth" in 1844. He saw the school being used for educating potential clergy.

In the previous year a serious controversy had sprung out of the refusal of Sir William Dunbar, priest of St. Paul's Chapel, Aberdeen, to receive or to administer the sacrament in accordance with the Scottish ritual. Acting with the concurrence of his synod, Skinner excommunicated Dunbar on 13 August 1843. The bishop was – according to the Dictionary of National Biography – assiduous and exemplary in the discharge of his duties, and did much during his primacy to consolidate the episcopal party in Scotland.

== Marriage and death ==
Skinner was married in 1804 to the youngest daughter of James Brand, cashier of the Aberdeen Banking Company. They had a daughter, Mary Garioch (1806–1864).

He died at 1 Golden Square, Aberdeen, on 15 April 1857, and was buried in St Peters Cemetery in the Spittal district of Old Aberdeen on 22 April.
