= Andrew Macfarlane (bishop) =

Scottish Anglican bishop

Styles of Andrew Macfarlane
- Reference style: The Right Reverend
- Spoken style: My Lord
- Religious style: Bishop

Andrew Macfarlane (died 1819) was an Anglican clergyman who served as a bishop in the Scottish Episcopal Church in the late 18th and early 19th-century.

He was appointed the Incumbent of Cornyhaugh, Forgue (1769–77), followed by the Incumbent of Keith, Ruthven and Aberchirder (1777–79), then the Incumbent of Strathnairn (1779–1817), and the Incumbent of Inverness and Dingwall (1779–1819).

He was consecrated as coadjutor bishop of Moray at Peterhead on 7 March 1787 by bishops Kilgour, Petrie, and Skinner. The following month, Bishop Petrie died on 19 April 1787 and Macfarlane succeeded as Bishop of Moray, as well as Bishop of Ross and Argyll. Macfarlane resigned the See of Moray in 1798, but retained Ross and Argyll until his death at Inverness in 1819.

== See also ==
- Andrew McFarlane (disambiguation), various people with similar name
