= George Gleig =

Primus of the Scottish Episcopal Church (1753–1840)

The Right Reverend George Gleig FRSE FSA LLD
- Bishop of Brechin; Primus of the Scottish Episcopal Church
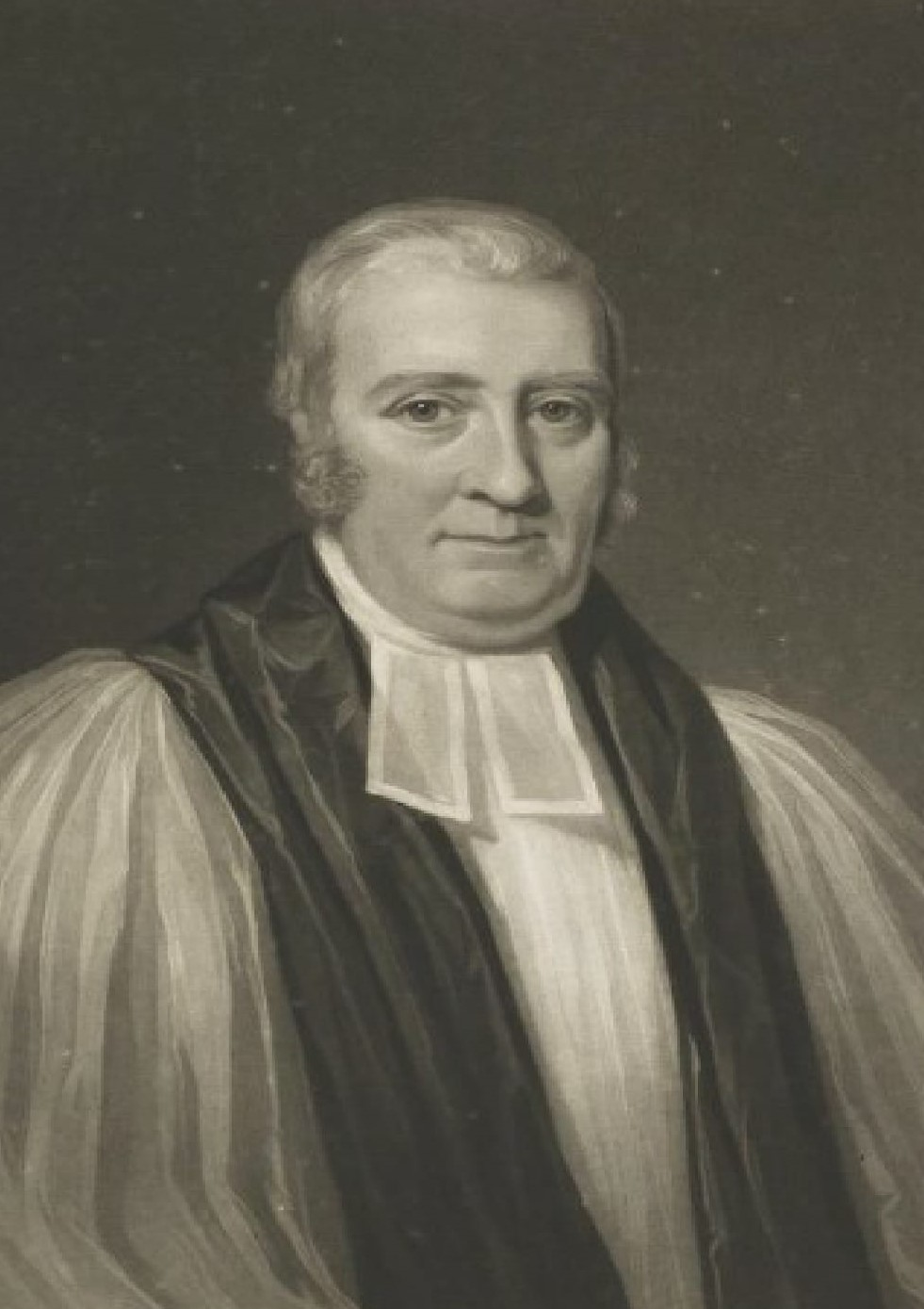
- Church: Scottish Episcopal Church
- Diocese: Brechin
- In office: 1810-1840
- Predecessor: John Strachan
- Successor: David Moir
- Other post: Primus of the Scottish Episcopal Church (1816–1837)

Orders
- Ordination: 1774
- Consecration: 30 October 1808 by John Skinner

Personal details
- Born: 12 May 1753 Arbuthnott, Aberdeenshire, Scotland
- Died: 9 March 1840 (aged 86) Stirling, Stirlingshire, Scotland
- Denomination: Anglican
- Education: University of Aberdeen

George Gleig (12 May 1753 – 9 March 1840) was a Scottish minister who transferred to the Episcopalian faith and became Primus of the Scottish Episcopal Church.

== Life ==
He was born at Boghall Farm, near Arbuthnott in Aberdeenshire, Scotland, the son of a farmer. He was educated at Arbuthnott Parish School.

At the age of thirteen he entered King's College, University of Aberdeen, where the first prize in mathematics and physical and moral sciences fell to him. In his twenty-first year he took orders in the Scottish Episcopal Church, and was ordained to the pastoral charge of a congregation at Pittenweem, Fife, whence he removed in 1790 to Stirling. He became a frequent contributor to the Monthly Review, the Gentleman's Magazine, the Anti-Jacobin Review and the British Critic. In 1786 he declined the office of bishop of Brechin.

He also wrote several articles for the third edition of the Encyclopædia Britannica, and on the death of the editor, Colin Macfarquhar, in 1793, was engaged to edit the remaining volumes. Among his principal contributions to this work were articles on Instinct, Theology and Metaphysics. The two supplementary volumes were mainly his own work.

In 1797 he was elected a Fellow of the Royal Society of Edinburgh. His proposers were James Gregory, Sir James Hall, and Dugald Stewart.

He was twice chosen bishop of Dunkeld, but the opposition of Bishop Skinner, afterwards Primus of Scotland, rendered the election on both occasions ineffectual. In 1808 he was consecrated assistant and successor to the bishop of Brechin, in 1810 was preferred to the sole charge, and in 1816 was elected Primus of the Scottish Episcopal Church, in which capacity he greatly aided in the introduction of many useful reforms, in fostering a more catholic and tolerant spirit, and in cementing a firm alliance with the sister Church of England.

He died at Stirling. He is buried in the chapel of Greyfriars Church in Stirling.

== Works ==
- Letters containing an Apology for the Episcopal Church of Scotland (1787)
- Some Account of the Life and Writings of the late William Robertson (1812)
- Directions on the Study of Theology (1827)

Besides various sermons, Gleig was the author of Directions for the Study of Theology, in a series of letters from a bishop to his son on his admission to holy orders (1827); an edition of Thomas Stackhouse's History of the Bible (1817); and a life of Robertson the historian, prefixed to an edition of his works. See Life of Bishop Gleig, by the Rev. W. Walker (1879). Letters to Alexander Henderson of Edinburgh and John Douglas, bishop of Salisbury, are in the British Museum.

== Family ==
In 1789 he married Janet Hamilton (a widow née Fullton). She died in 1824.

His third and only surviving son, George Robert, was a noted soldier and chaplain.

Scottish Episcopal Church titles
Preceded by John Skinner	Primus of the Scottish Episcopal Church; 1816–1837	Succeeded by James Walker (bishop)
Preceded by John Strachan	Bishop of Brechin; 1810-1840	Succeeded by David Moir
