= John Skinner (bishop) =

Scottish clergyman

The Most Reverend John Skinner
- Bishop of Aberdeen; Primus of the Scottish Episcopal Church
- Church: Scottish Episcopal Church
- Diocese: Aberdeen
- In office: 1786-1816
- Predecessor: Robert Kilgour
- Successor: William Skinner
- Other post: Primus of the Scottish Episcopal Church (1788-1816)

Orders
- Ordination: 1764
- Consecration: 25 September 1782 by Robert Kilgour

Personal details
- Born: 17 May 1744 Longside, Aberdeenshire, Scotland
- Died: 13 July 1816 (aged 72) Aberdeen, Aberdeenshire, Scotland
- Denomination: Anglican
- Parents: John Skinner & Grissel Hunter
- Spouse: Mary Robertson
- Children: 8
- Education: Marischal College

Styles of John Skinner, A.M.
- Reference style: The Most Reverend
- Spoken style: Your Grace

John Skinner (17 May 1744 – 13 July 1816) was an Episcopalian clergyman who served as the Bishop of Aberdeen from 1786 to 1816 and Primus of the Scottish Episcopal Church from 1788 to 1816.

== Early life and family ==
He was born at Linshart, Longside, Aberdeenshire on 17 May 1744, the second son of the Reverend John Skinner, Incumbent of Lerwick and Grissel Hunter. He was educated at Marischal College, Aberdeen; obtaining a Master of Arts degree in 1761. He married in 1765 to Mary Robertson (1736–1807), and they had five sons and three daughters. One of their sons, John (1769–1841), became Dean of Dunkeld and Dunblane, and another son, William (1778–1857), became Bishop of Aberdeen.

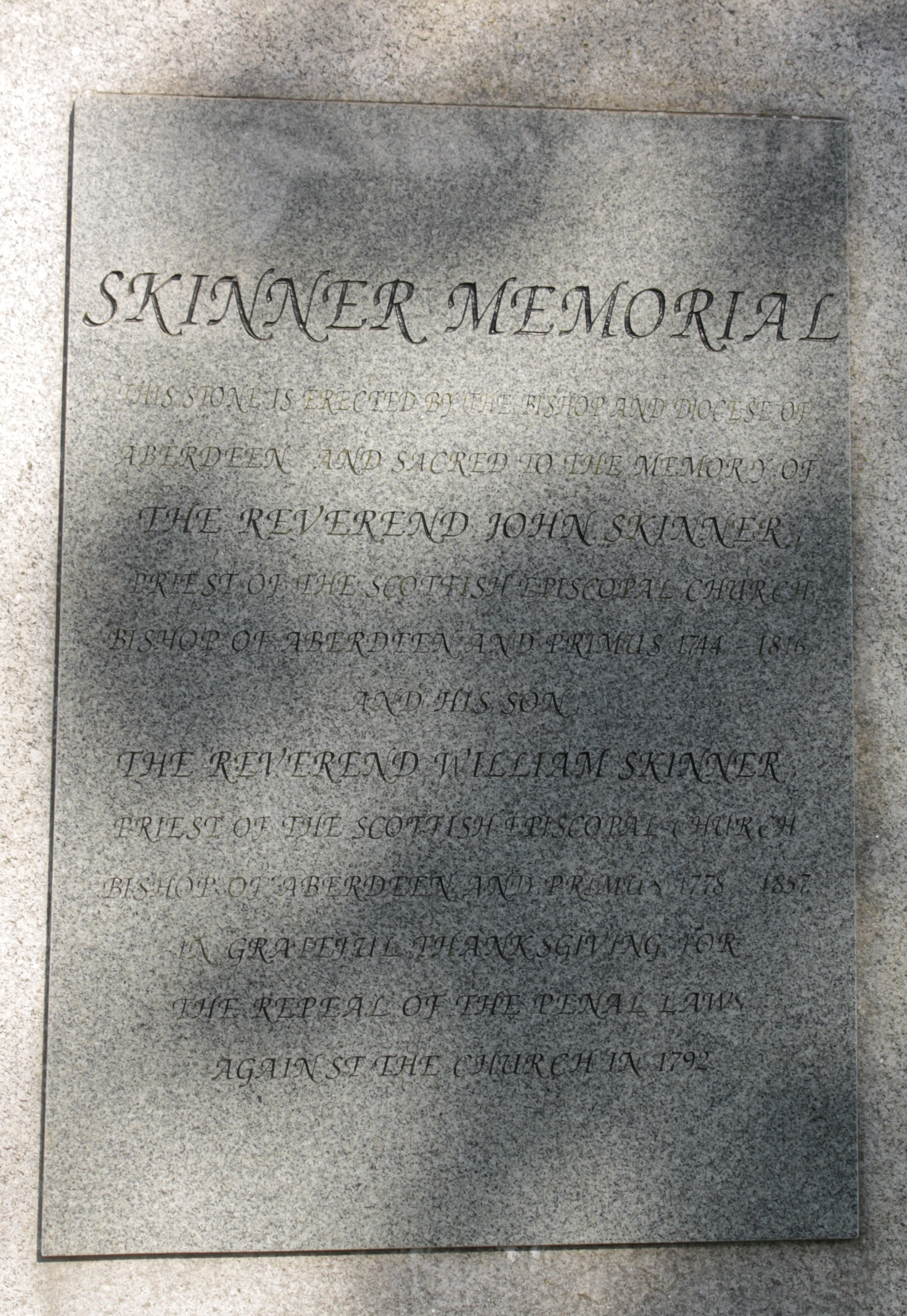
Skinner memorial, St Peters Cemetery, Old Aberdeen

== Ecclesiastical career ==
He was ordained a deacon in 1763 and a priest in 1764. His first pastoral appointment was as the Incumbent of Ellon and Udny (1764–1775), and then the Incumbent of Aberdeen (1775–1816), a post he held until his death. Skinner was appointed coadjutor bishop of Aberdeen and consecrated on 25 September 1782 by bishops Kilgour, Rose and Petrie. He was one of the three bishops to consecrate Samuel Seabury, an American Episcopal priest as a bishop in 1784. On the resignation of Bishop Robert Kilgour, Skinner became Bishop of Aberdeen in October 1786. Two years later, he also became the Primus of the Scottish Episcopal Church.

He died in office in Aberdeen on 13 July 1816, aged 72, and was buried in St Peters Cemetery in the Spital district of Old Aberdeen. He was succeeded by his son, William, as Bishop of Aberdeen.

William Walker wrote a biography of Bishop Skinner.

== Publications ==
- A Course of Lectures for the Young (1786)
- An Ecclesiastical History of Scotland (1788)
- A Layman's Account of his Faith and Practice (1801)
- Primitive Truth and Order Vindicated (1803)

== Bibliography ==
- Bertie, David M. (2000). Scottish Episcopal Clergy, 1689–2000. Edinburgh: T & T Clark. ISBN 0567087468.
- Keith, Robert (1824). Russel, Michael (ed.). An Historical Catalogue of the Scottish Bishops: Down To The Year 1688. Edinburgh: Printed for Bell and Bradfute.
- Scottish Episcopal Church History "Scottish Episcopal Church History: A Moment in the Century: Persecution and an Argument are Over." Contains information about John Skinner.

Scottish Episcopal Church titles
Preceded by Robert Kilgour	Bishop of Aberdeen; 1786–1816	Succeeded by William Skinner
Preceded by Robert Kilgour	Primus of the Scottish Episcopal Church; 1788–1816	Succeeded by George Gleig
