= St Peter's Church, Linlithgow =

St Peter's, Linlithgow
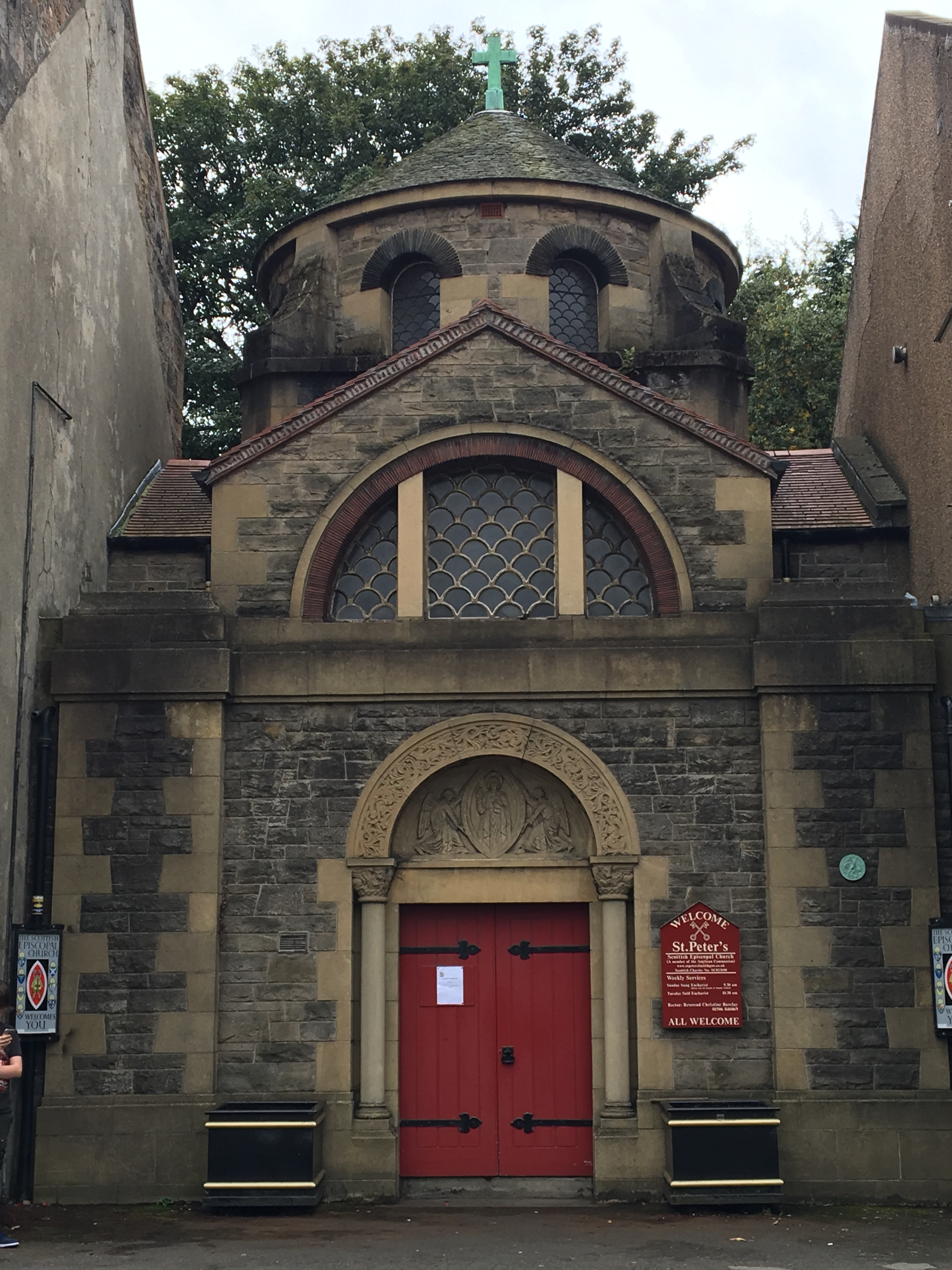
- St Peter's, Linlithgow
- 55.9761°N 3.6039°W
- Denomination: Scottish Episcopal Church

History
- Former name(s): St Mildred's, Linlithgow
- Status: Active
- Founded: 1912
- Consecrated: 30 May 1928

Architecture
- Heritage designation: B
- Designated: 18 December 1976
- Architect: J.W. Todd
- Architectural type: Byzantine
- Groundbreaking: 18 May 1927
- Completed: May 1928
- Construction cost: £1,000

Administration
- Diocese: Edinburgh

St Peter's Church, Linlithgow is a parish of the Scottish Episcopal Church in the town of Linlithgow, Scotland, in the Diocese of Edinburgh. Its historic parish church on Linlithgow High Street is a Category B listed building.

== History ==
The church's origins as an organisation date back to 1912, when a group of local Episcopalians formed a group called the St Peter's Episcopal Mission. In its early years, the congregation had no permanent building, and at first used a variety of locations around the town: the Court Room of the Burgh Halls, a closed public house and an assortment of shops. They secured the use of a hall on the High Street, only for it to be requisitioned by the army in 1914. They then used the defunct Craigmailen United Free Church, but were forced to vacate the building due to dry rot. The congregation also used rooms owned by the Scotch Girls Friendly Society, then a room at the Palace Hotel.

This situation lasted until 1924, when the congregation's Priest-in-Charge, Rev W.S. Snow, reported their plight to the Bishop of Edinburgh, G.H.S. Walpole. The bishop put down £100 to purchase a site on the High Street, and promised a further £500 towards the cost, this to come from a speaking tour he was about to give in the USA. Even with this, the first plan of architect J.W. Todd proved too costly, and the congregation could not have afforded the £1600 bill. A less ambitious £1000 design was later adopted. The church was required to slot into a space measuring just 26 feet in width. The church's unusual Byzantine design was chosen at least in part because it would alleviate the problem of letting sufficient light into such a narrow space with taller buildings on either side.

The founding stone was laid by Colonel Maclaren of the Craigs on 18 May 1927, and the church was completed almost exactly a year later. Despite the fact that the congregation had always been named St Peter's, Bishop Walpole dedicated it to St Mildred, with whom his late wife had shared a name. The name reverted to St Peter's in 1978, though St Mildred is still featured on one of the stained glass windows in the sanctuary.

== Organisation ==
The church is linked with St Columba's Church in nearby Bathgate.
