= Timothy Morris =

Timothy Morris may refer to:

- Timothy Morris (diplomat), ambassador of the United Kingdom to South Sudan, 2015–2017
- Timothy D. Morris (1818–1876), American politician and pioneer in Wisconsin
- Timothy Dwight Morris (1817–1894), American colonel for the Union Army during the American Civil War
- Tim Morris (born 1955), Australian politician.
- Tim Morris (priest), dean of Edinburgh, 1992–2001
