= Logie Danson =

Scottish bishop

The Right Reverend Logie Danson D.D.
- Bishop of Edinburgh; Primus of the Scottish Episcopal Church
- Church: Scottish Episcopal Church
- Diocese: Edinburgh
- In office: 1939-1946 (Bishop of Edinburgh); 1943-1946 (Primus)
- Predecessor: Harry Reid
- Successor: Kenneth Warner
- Previous post: Bishop of Labuan and Sarawak (1917-1931)

Orders
- Ordination: 1907 by Walter Robberds
- Consecration: 21 September 1917 by Randall Davidson

Personal details
- Born: 14 June 1880 Arbroath, Angus, Scotland
- Died: 9 December 1946 (aged 66) Walkerburn, Scottish Borders, Scotland
- Parents: James Myers Danson & Frances Ellen Rees
- Spouse: Ada Irene Harvey (m. 1918)
- Education: Aberdeen University

Ernest Denny Logie Danson (14 June 1880 – 9 December 1946) was an Anglican bishop in the first half of the 20th century.

== Biography ==
He was born into a distinguished clerical family — his father was Myers Danson, Dean of Aberdeen and Orkney — on 14 June 1880 and educated at Trinity College, Glenalmond and Aberdeen University. He was ordained deacon in 1906 and priest in 1907 and began his career with a curacy at St Paul's Cathedral, Dundee. From 1906 he was a Missionary Priest in Southeast Asia eventually becoming Bishop of Labuan and Sarawak.

He then returned to England as a Canon Residentiary of Carlisle Cathedral and Assistant Bishop of Carlisle (both 1931–1938) before being appointed Provost of St Mary's Cathedral, Edinburgh and an Assistant Bishop of Edinburgh. He was then elected diocesan Bishop of Edinburgh in 1939. Four years later he was elected Primus of Scotland; ill-health caused him to resign as Primus in May 1946, and to resign his See in September before his death on 9 December 1946.

Church of England titles
Preceded by Rupert Mounsey	Bishop of Labuan and Sarawak; 1917–1931	Succeeded by Noel Hudson
Preceded by William Margetson	Provost of St Mary’s Cathedral, Edinburgh; 1938–1939	Succeeded by Colin Dunlop
Preceded by Harry Reid	Bishop of Edinburgh; 1939–1946	Succeeded by Kenneth Warner
Preceded by Arthur Maclean	Primus of the Scottish Episcopal Church; 1943–1946	Succeeded by John How
