= Jim Mein =

James Adlington Mein (born 1938) was Dean of Edinburgh from 2001 to 2004.

Born in 1938 and educated at the University of Nottingham, he was ordained after a period of study at Westcott House, Cambridge in 1964. He was the curate at St Columba, Edinburgh then Domestic Chaplain to the Bishop of Edinburgh. He was in Malawi from 1967 to 1972. He held incumbencies in Grangemouth, Livingston and Edinburgh before his time as Dean. After this he was the Interim Minister at Holy Trinity, Dunfermline.

== Notes ==
Anglican Communion titles
Preceded by Tim Morris	Dean of Edinburgh; 2001 – 2004	Succeeded by Kevin Pearson
