= Kenneth Warner =

Bishop of Edinburgh (1891–1983)

The Right Reverend Kenneth Warner D.D.
- Bishop of Edinburgh
- Church: Scottish Episcopal Church
- Diocese: Edinburgh
- Elected: 1947
- In office: 1947–1961
- Predecessor: Logie Danson
- Successor: Kenneth Carey

Orders
- Ordination: 1924
- Consecration: 22 January 1947 by John How

Personal details
- Born: 6 April 1891 Tonbridge, Kent, England
- Died: 18 March 1983 (aged 91)
- Denomination: Anglican
- Parents: Charles Edward Warner & Ethel Constantia Catharine Cornfoot
- Spouse: Constance Margaret Hill (1916–1968); Angela Margaret Prescott-Decie (m. 1970)
- Education: Trinity College, Oxford

Kenneth Charles Harman Warner (6 April 1891 – 18 March 1983) was Bishop of Edinburgh from 1947 to 1961.

== Biography ==
Warner was born on 6 April 1891 and educated at Yardley Court, Tonbridge School and Trinity College, Oxford. His first career as a solicitor was interrupted by wartime service with the Army Cyclist Corps at the end of which he was awarded the DSO. Ordained after a period of study at Ripon College Cuddesdon in 1924, he began his career with a curacy at St George's Ramsgate. After this he was a chaplain in the Royal Air Force flying on active service in his fifties then Provost of St. Mary's Cathedral, Glasgow. In 1938 he became Archdeacon of Lincoln before his ordination to the episcopate. He died on 18 March 1983.

Religious titles
Preceded by Algernon Giles Seymour	Provost of St. Mary's Cathedral, Glasgow; 1933 –1937	Succeeded by John Murray
Preceded by Hubert Larken	Archdeacon of Lincoln; 1938 –1947	Succeeded by Kenneth Edward Norman Lamplugh
Preceded by Ernest Denny Logie Danson	Bishop of Edinburgh; 1947 –1961	Succeeded by Kenneth Moir Carey
