= John Dowden =

Bishop of Edinburgh; Irish Anglican/Episcopalian bishop

The Right Reverend John Dowden
- Bishop of Edinburgh
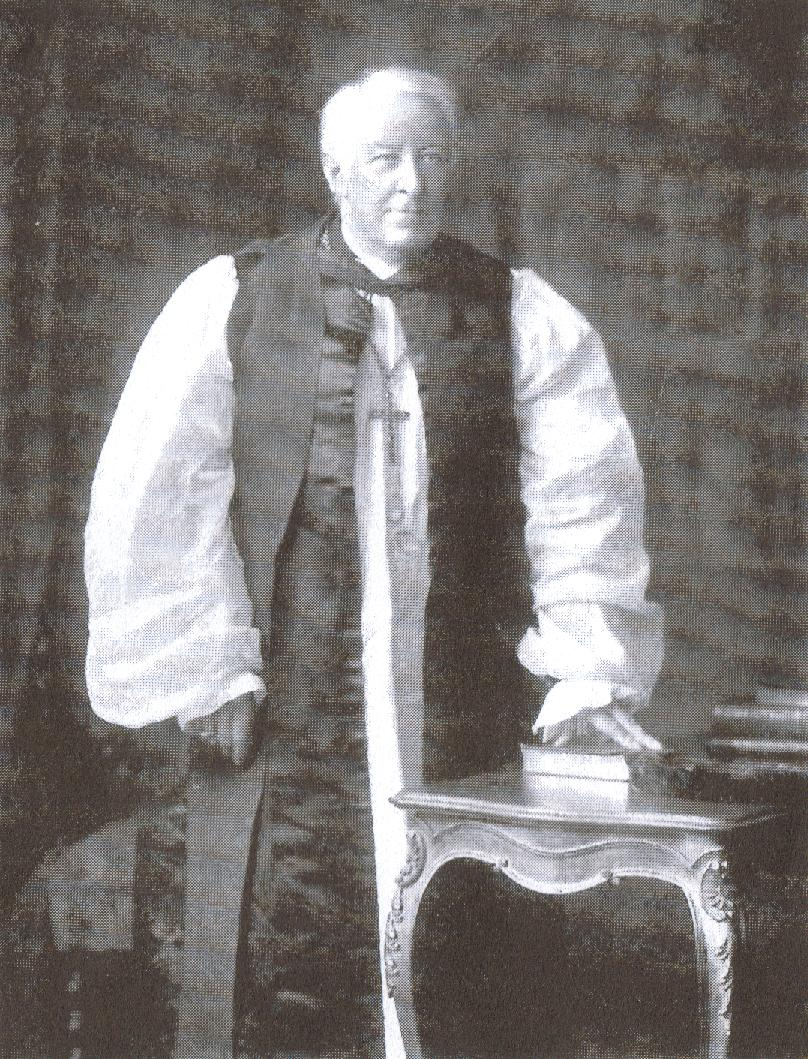
- Church: Scottish Episcopal Church
- Diocese: Edinburgh
- Elected: 1886
- In office: 1886–1910
- Predecessor: Henry Cotterill
- Successor: Somerset Walpole

Orders
- Ordination: 1865 by Hamilton Verschoyle
- Consecration: 21 September 1886 by Hugh Jermyn

Personal details
- Born: 29 June 1840 Cork, Ireland
- Died: 30 January 1910 (aged 69) Edinburgh, Scotland
- Buried: Dean Cemetery
- Denomination: Anglican
- Spouse: Louisa Jones (m. 1864)
- Children: 6
- Education: Trinity College Dublin

John Dowden /d͡ʒɒn ˈdaʊdən/ (29 June 1840 – 30 January 1910) was an Irish-born bishop and ecclesiastical historian. He served in the Scottish Episcopal Church as the Bishop of Edinburgh.

== Life ==
He was born in Cork on 29 June 1840, as the fifth of five children of John Wheeler Dowden and Alicia Bennett. His famous brother was the poet, professor and literary critic Edward Dowden. Although his father was Presbyterian, John followed his mother by becoming an Anglican, although he attended both churches in his youth. When he was sixteen he became a student at Queen's College, Cork as a medical student. John began encountering health problems, problems which made it difficult to pursue his original career. In 1858, while contemplating a religious career, he enrolled at Trinity College Dublin. He graduated in 1864 and was ordained as a deacon, moving to Sligo. In the same year he married, wedding a woman named Louisa Jones, by whom he would eventually father six children. John was ordained as a priest in 1865, and moved through a variety of positions slowly rising in prestige. John continued his studies and received a Bachelor of Divinity (BD) degree from Trinity College.

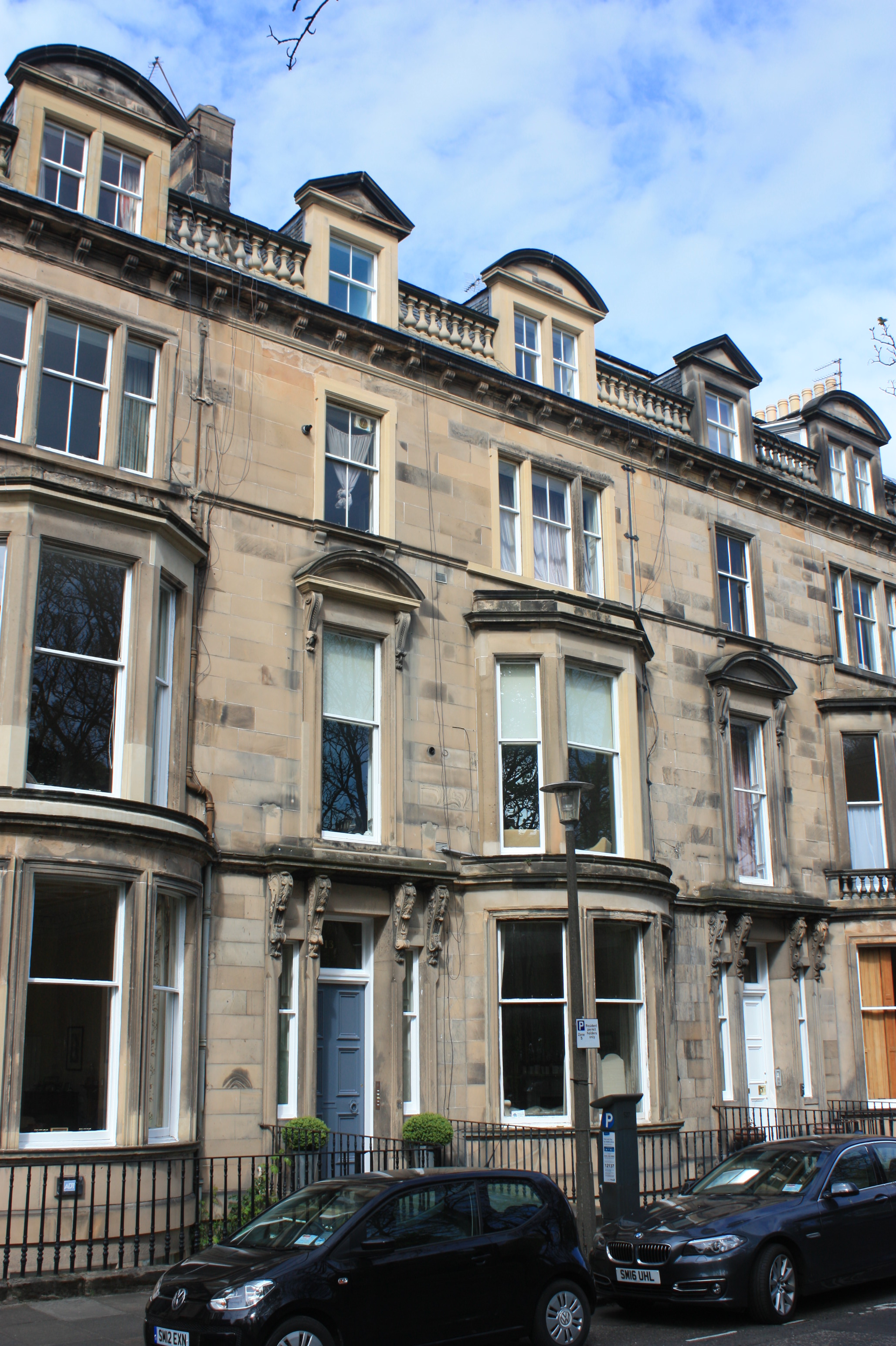
13 Learmonth Terrace, Edinburgh

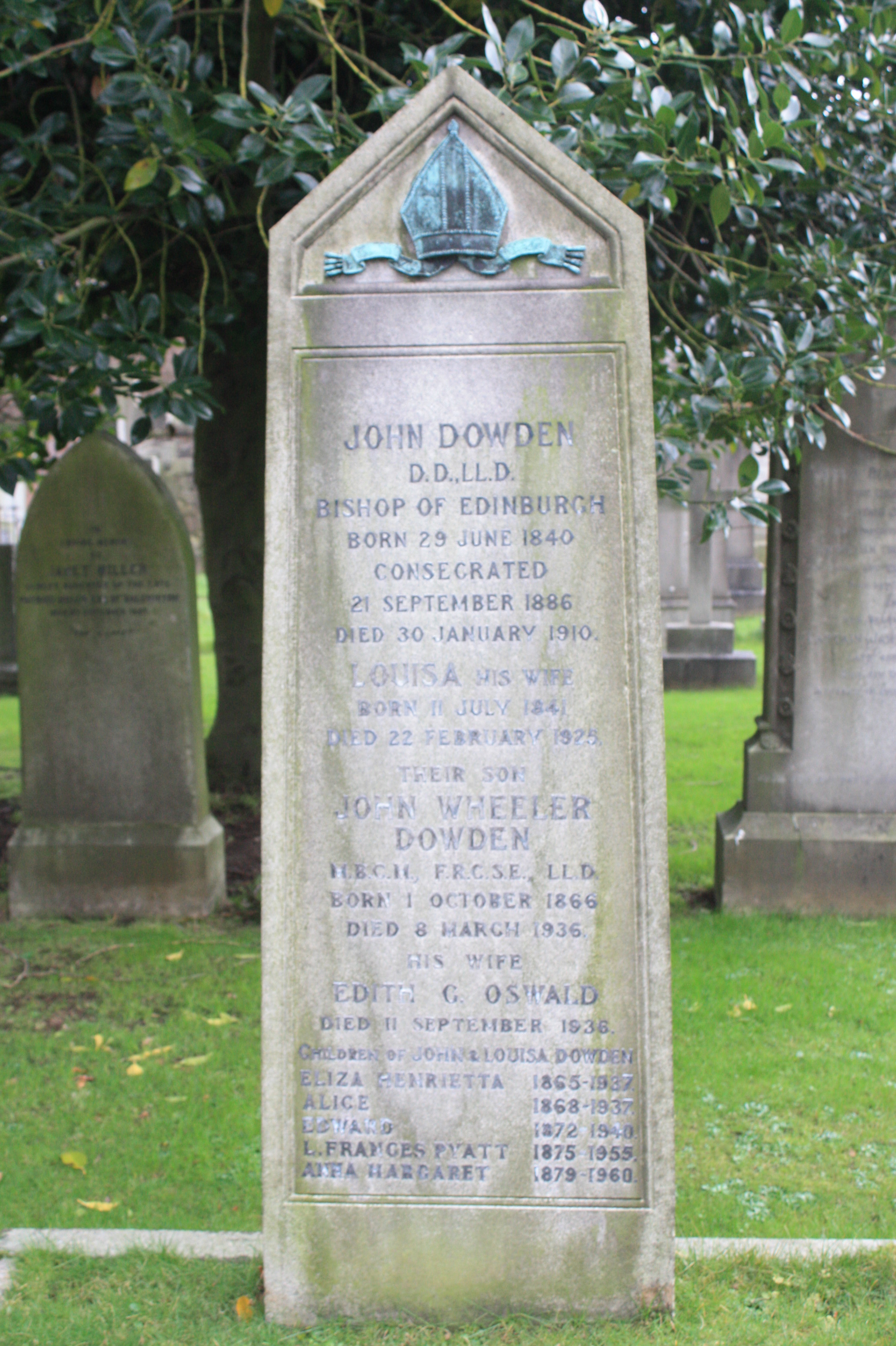
The grave of Bishop John Dowden, Dean Cemetery, Edinburgh

In 1886, he was consecrated as the Episcopalian bishop of Edinburgh and served in St Mary's Episcopal Cathedral in Edinburgh's West End and served this role until death. In the late 19th century he lived at 10 Gillsland Road in the Merchiston district of Edinburgh, but in his later years he lived at 13 Learmonth Terrace, a substantial Victorian terraced house, west of the cathedral.

He died in Edinburgh on 30 January 1910 and is buried in the Victorian north extension of Dean Cemetery in western Edinburgh. He is buried with his wife Louisa and son John Wheeler Dowden LLD, FRCSEd (1866–1936), who was president of the Royal College of Surgeons of Edinburgh.

His memorial in St Mary's Cathedral was designed by Sir Robert Lorimer in 1911.

== Scholarly work ==
As a scholar, he was author of many works of thorough scholarship, including The Medieval Church in Scotland: its constitution, organisation and law (1910) and The Bishops of Scotland: being notes on the lives of all the bishops, under each of the sees, prior to the Reformation (1912). Both were published posthumously by James Maclehose and Sons, Glasgow. The former, although extremely dated, is still regarded as one of the main starting points in medieval Scottish ecclesiastical history, and the latter remains to this day one of the most comprehensive guides to medieval Scottish episcopal prosopography. An earlier work, The Workmanship of the Prayer Book: In Its Literary and Liturgical Aspects, (London: Methuen, 1899) remains an indispensable analysis of the background to and ethos of the Book of Common Prayer.

Dowden gave the Rhind lectures in 1901, on "The Constitution, Organisation, and Law of the Mediaeval Church in Scotland".

== Family ==
He married Louise Jones in September 1864; they had four daughters and two sons.

Religious titles
Preceded by Henry Cotterill	Bishop of Edinburgh; 1886–1910	Succeeded by Somerset Walpole
