= Dagmar Winter =

Dagmar Winter may refer to

- Dagmar Winter (1931–2011), German-British actor Dana Wynter
- Dagmar Winter (bishop) (born 1965), Bishop of Edinburgh
