= Somerset Walpole =

English Anglican priest, bishop, teacher and author

The Right Reverend Somerset Walpole
- Bishop of Edinburgh
- Somerset Walpole as Bishop of Edinburgh in 1921
- Church: Scottish Episcopal Church
- Diocese: Edinburgh
- Elected: 1910
- In office: 1910-1929
- Predecessor: John Dowden
- Successor: Harry Reid

Orders
- Consecration: 24 June 1910

Personal details
- Born: 9 November 1854 Balderton, Nottinghamshire, England
- Died: 4 March 1929 (aged 74) Edinburgh, Scotland
- Denomination: Anglican
- Spouse: Mildred Helen
- Children: 3
- Education: Trinity College, Cambridge

George Henry Somerset Walpole (9 November 1854 – 4 March 1929), known as Somerset Walpole was an Anglican priest, bishop, teacher and author. After early service in the west of England he moved first to Auckland, New Zealand, and then to New York, before returning to England. After educational work in Durham and pastoral work in London he was elected Bishop of Edinburgh in 1910, and held the post until his death.

A moderate High Churchman, Walpole was well disposed to and trusted by co-religionists of different views. He published more than twenty books on theology and practical religious matters. The eldest of his three children was the novelist Hugh Walpole.

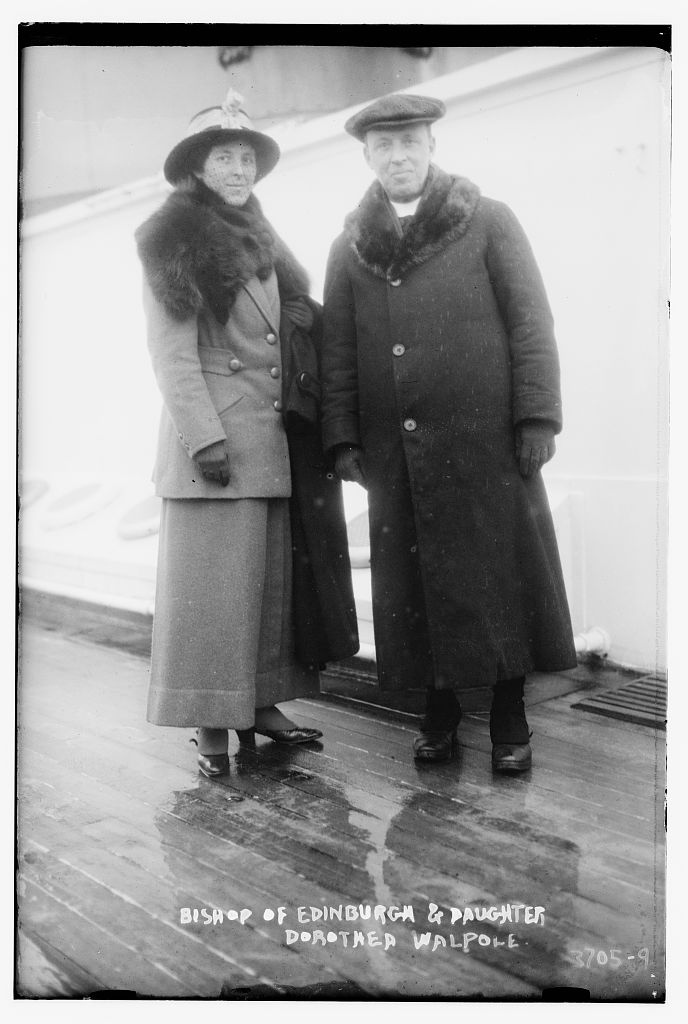
Walpole and his daughter Dorothy arriving in New York aboard Holland-America Line's Noordam in 1915

== Life and career ==
Walpole was born in Balderton, Nottinghamshire, the son of the Rev. Robert Seymour Walpole (1820–1910), vicar of St Giles's, Balderton, and Elizabeth, daughter of Reverend Frederick Apthorp, rector of Gumley, Leicestershire. Rev. Robert Seymour Walpole was a son of the classical scholar Robert Walpole, grandson of diplomat Robert Walpole, and great-grandson of Horatio Walpole, 1st Baron Walpole.

Walpole's father had been an army officer before taking holy orders, and he envisaged a military career for his son; Walpole was from an early age drawn to the church. He was educated at King's Lynn Grammar School, and then Trinity College, Cambridge, where he took a first class degree in theology in 1877. As soon as he left Cambridge he was invited by Bishop Benson to become a tutor at the Scholae Cancellarii, Truro. Benson subsequently ordained Walpole as deacon and then priest. From 1878 Walpole combined the teaching post with that of curate of St Mary's, Truro, and was successively Priest-Vicar and Succentor of the cathedral. In 1880 he suggested to Benson that a carol service should be held on Christmas Eve as a counter-attraction to the public houses. Benson agreed, and drew up an order of service of nine lessons and carols, which was later taken up by cathedrals and parish churches all round the world.

In 1882 Walpole married Mildred Helen (1854–1925), daughter of Charles Foster Barham. They had two sons, the elder of whom was the author Hugh Walpole, and a daughter. Walpole served in Truro until 1882, when he was offered the incumbency of St Mary's Pro-Cathedral, Auckland, New Zealand. On Benson's advice he accepted. He held the post concurrently with that of warden of St John's theological college, Auckland.

From 1889 to 1896 Walpole was professor of dogmatic theology in the General Theological Seminary, New York; In 1896 he returned to England, serving as principal of Bede College, Durham until 1903. In that year he was appointed examining chaplain to William Maclagan, Archbishop of York. From 1904 to 1910 he was rector of St Mary-at-Lambeth, London, and was appointed an honorary canon of Southwark Cathedral by Bishop Talbot in 1906. In 1908 he accepted a residential canonry at Exeter, but changed his mind, and withdrew, for reasons that are not recorded.

In May 1910 the clerical and lay electors of the Scottish Episcopal Diocese of Edinburgh had reached deadlock in their efforts to agree on a successor to Bishop Dowden who had died in office in January. Neither of the two candidates, Provost Skinner Wilson and Canon J G Simpson, could secure a majority, and Wilson withdrew in Walpole's favour. All 34 lay electors and 47 of the 52 clerical electors voted for Walpole; he was consecrated Bishop of Edinburgh on 24 June, but then returned temporarily to Lambeth to complete his duties there. He took up his episcopal office in August.

Among his achievements as bishop was the completion of St Mary's Cathedral by the construction of two new towers. The Times said of him at the time of his election, "He is a moderate High Churchman, as firm in his beliefs as he is cordial towards those who differ from him, and the diocese to which he goes, and which has not been without its disagreements, will find in him a peaceable and unifying influence." After his death the same paper said, "The Bishop was not only beloved in his own Church, but by his charm of personality and his spirituality had won the esteem of many in other communions in Scotland."

Walpole died suddenly on 4 March 1929, at the age of 74. His funeral was at the cathedral; he was buried in the country churchyard of Dalmahoy, East Lothian, alongside his wife who was buried there in 1925.

== Publications ==
- The Divine Example, 1896
- Joshua, Judges, Ruth (Rivington's Handbooks), 1900–1901
- Vital Religion – or The Personal Knowledge of Christ, 1902
- The People's Psalter, 1903
- Communion and Offering, 1904
- The Mission of the Holy Ghost, 1905
- Personality and Power, 1906
- Church and Empire, 1907 (co-editor with the Rev J Ellison)
- The Kingdom of Heaven: the Paddock Lectures for 1909.
- Gains and Losses, 1911
- Prayer and Communion, 1912
- Life's Chance, 1912
- The Shrine and the Presence, 1913
- The Holy Trinity, 1914
- The Gospel of Hope, 1914
- This Time and its Interpretation, 1915
- Witness, 1916
- Life in the World to come, 1917
- The Sealed Book, 1918
- A Vision of Judgments, 1919
- Prophets and Priests – or Facing the Facts
- The Greatest Service in the World, 1924
- The Devotional study of the Bible, 1925
- The Undiscovered Country and the Way To It, 1925
- Waiting, 1926
- The Great Reality, 1928
- Triumphant love – Studies in the Epistles and Gospels for Holy Week and Easter, 1929

== Notes ==
Religious titles
Preceded by John Dowden	Bishop of Edinburgh; 1910 –1929	Succeeded by Harry Seymour Reid
