= Brian Hardy =

Dean of Edinburgh

The Very Reverend Brian Albert Hardy (3 July 1931 – 16 November 2019) was Dean of Edinburgh from 1986 to 1991.

Educated at St John's College, Oxford, he was ordained after a period of study at Westcott House Cambridge, deacon in 1957 and priest in 1958. He was the curate at Rugeley from 1957 to 1962 then Chaplain at Downing College, Cambridge from 1962 to 1966. He was Curate in charge at Livingston from 1966 to 1974; Churches’ Planning Officer for Telford from 1974 to 1978; Chaplain to Edinburgh Theological College from 1978 to 1982; Rector of St Columba's by the Castle Edinburgh from 1982 to 1991. before his time as Dean.

== Notes ==
Anglican Communion titles
Preceded by Ernest William Brady	Dean of Edinburgh; 1986 – 1991	Succeeded by Timothy David Morris
