= Ernest Brady =

Ernest William Brady (10 November 1917 – 13 May 2003) was Dean of Edinburgh from 1976 to 1982; and again from 1985 to 1986.

He was educated at Harris Academy, the University of St Andrews and Edinburgh Theological College. He was ordained Deacon in 1942 and priest in 1943. He held curacies at Christ Church, Glasgow and St Alphage, Hendon; and incumbencies at All Saints Buckie, All Saints Edinburgh and the Priory Church of St Mary of Mount Carmel, South Queensferry before his time as Dean.

== Notes ==
Anglican Communion titles
Preceded by Robert James Vodden Clark	Dean of Edinburgh; 1976 – 1982	Succeeded by Malcolm Aiken Clark
Preceded by Malcolm Aiken Clark	Dean of Edinburgh; 1985 – 1986	Succeeded by Brian Albert Hardy
