= Harry Reid (bishop) =

Scottish bishop

The Right Reverend Harry Reid
- Bishop of Edinburgh
- Church: Scottish Episcopal Church
- Diocese: Edinburgh
- Elected: 1929
- In office: 1929-1939
- Predecessor: Somerset Walpole
- Successor: Logie Danson

Orders
- Ordination: 1884
- Consecration: 1929

Personal details
- Born: 30 June 1866
- Died: 18 January 1943 (aged 76) Edinburgh, Scotland
- Buried: St John's, Edinburgh
- Denomination: Anglican
- Education: University of Glasgow

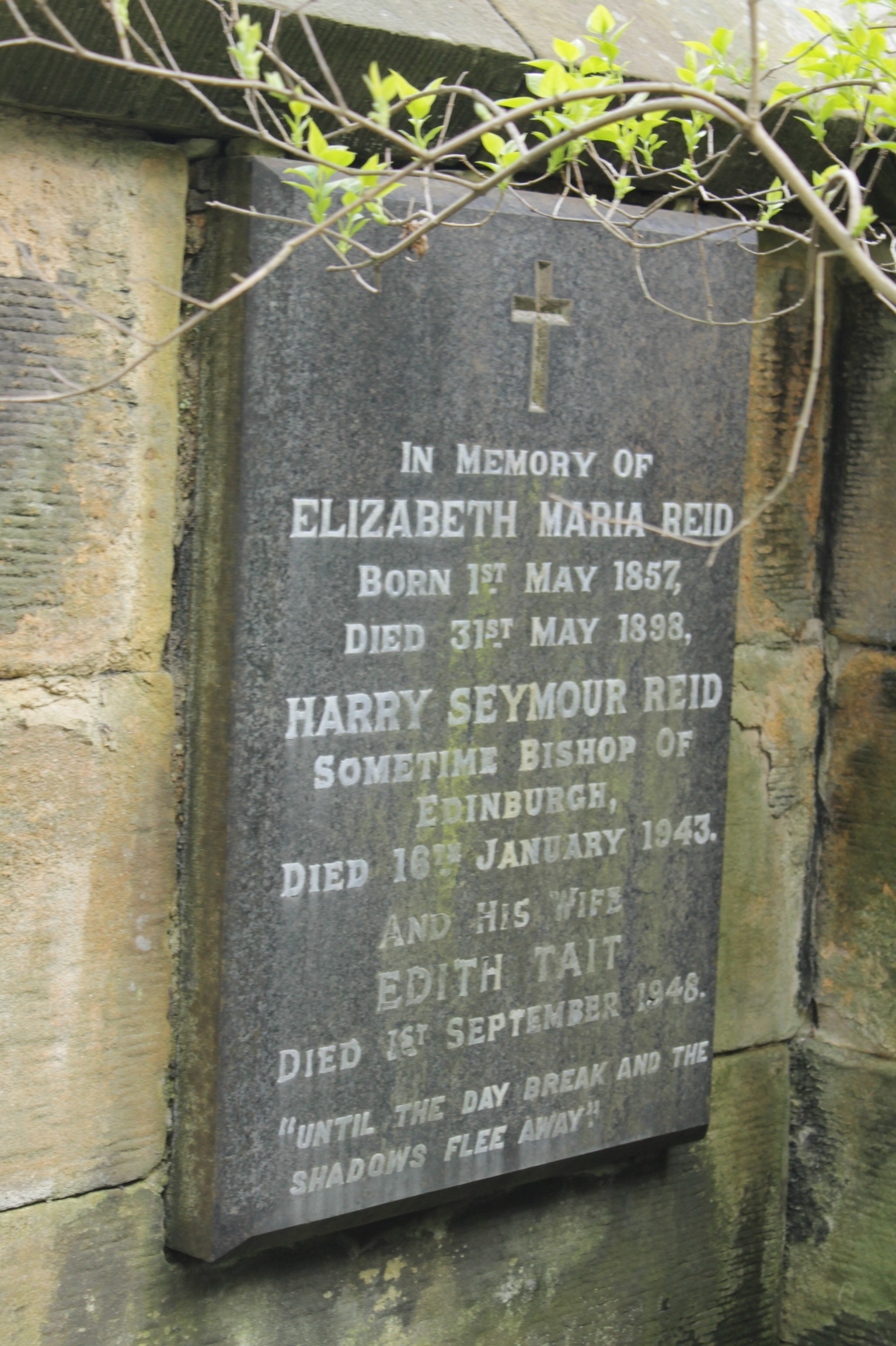
The grave of Bishop H S Reid, St John's Churchyard, Edinburgh

Harry Seymour Reid (30 June 1866 - 18 January 1943) was Bishop of Edinburgh from 1929 until 1939.

== Life ==
He was educated at Loretto School east of Edinburgh and then studied at Glasgow University, graduating MA in 1892. He was ordained in 1884 and began his career with a curacy at St John the Evangelist, Edinburgh. After this he was Senior Chaplain at St Mary's Cathedral, Edinburgh and then held incumbencies at St Mark's, Portobello, Edinburgh and St Paul's, York Place in the same city. In 1919 he became Dean of Edinburgh before his appointment to the episcopate.

He is buried near the south-west corner of St John's churchyard in Edinburgh.

== Family ==
Reid married first Elizabeth Maria (1857-1898), whose grave is pictured. He married secondly, at St. John's Mission church in Edinburgh on 24 June 1902, to Edith Tait, daughter of Professor Peter Guthrie Tait.

Religious titles
Preceded by John Wilson	Dean of Edinburgh; 1919–1929	Succeeded by William Perry
Preceded by Somerset Walpole	Bishop of Edinburgh; 1929–1939	Succeeded by Logie Danson
