= Michael Parker (bishop) =

British Anglican bishop (1900–1980)

The Right Reverend Michael Parker
- Bishop of Bradford
- Church: Church of England
- Diocese: Diocese of Bradford
- In office: 1961 to 1971
- Other posts: Bishop of Aston (1954–1961); Archdeacon of Aston (1946–1954)

Orders
- Ordination: 1923 (deacon); 1924 (priest)
- Consecration: 18 October 1954 by Geoffrey Fisher

Personal details
- Born: Clement George St Michael Parker; 29 September 1900
- Died: 5 March 1980 (aged 79)
- Denomination: Anglicanism
- Education: Christ Church, Oxford

Clement George St Michael Parker (29 September 1900 – 5 March 1980) was a British Anglican bishop who served as Bishop of Aston and later Bishop of Bradford.

== Early life and education ==
Parker was born in Edgbaston, Birmingham, England on 29 September 1900. His father, W. H. Parker, was also a priest. He was educated at Christ Church, Oxford.

== Ministry ==
Parker was made deacon on St Michael's Day 1923 (29 September) by Henry Wakefield (Bishop of Birmingham) and ordained priest in Advent 1924 (19 December) by Ernest Barnes, Bishop of Birmingham — both times at Birmingham Cathedral. He was an assistant curate at St Bartholomew & St Jude's Birmingham from 1923 to 1939; although due to the objections to the high church practices of the parish, he was only licensed by the bishop in 1937. During his curacy at St Jude's he and his vicar, Denis Tyndall, compiled Adoremus: A Book of Eucharistic Worship for the Young. The book was described as "primarily for use at what is known as the Children's Eucharist", but was also "to meet the need of the increasing number of parishes in which there is the 'Parish Eucharist'". It was regularly used for the children's Eucharist at All Saints' King's Heath and also for the Parish Eucharist instituted by Michael Parker to replace Matins as the main Sunday morning service.

He was vicar of All Saints' Church, King's Heath, Birmingham from 1939 to 1957. He was additionally rural dean of King's Norton from 1943 to 1957, and Archdeacon of Aston from 1946 to 1954.

On 18 October 1954, Parker was consecrated a bishop by Geoffrey Fisher, Archbishop of Canterbury, at Westminster Abbey, to serve as Bishop of Aston, the sole suffragan bishop of the Diocese of Birmingham. He translated to the Diocese of Bradford as Bishop of Bradford, its diocesan bishop, in 1961. On retirement in 1971, he was appointed an assistant bishop in the dioceses of Coventry and Worcester.

He died on 5 March 1980. He never married nor had children.

Church of England titles
New title	Bishop of Aston; 1954–1961	Succeeded by David Porter
Preceded by Donald Coggan	Bishop of Bradford; 1961–1971	Succeeded by Ross Hook
