= Colin Buchanan (bishop) =

British Anglican bishop and academic (1934–2023)

The Right Reverend Colin Buchanan
- Bishop of Woolwich
- Buchanan in 2002
- Church: Church of England
- Diocese: Southwark
- In office: 1996–2004
- Predecessor: Peter Hall
- Successor: Christopher Chessun
- Other posts: Honorary assistant bishop in Bradford (2004–2023); Bishop of Aston (1985–1989); Principal of St John's College, Nottingham (1979–1985)

Orders
- Ordination: 1961 (deacon); 1962 (priest)
- Consecration: 1985

Personal details
- Born: 9 August 1934
- Died: 29 November 2023 (aged 89)
- Denomination: Anglican
- Parents: Robert & Kathleen Buchanan
- Profession: Academic (liturgics)
- Education: Lincoln College, Oxford

Colin Ogilvie Buchanan (9 August 1934 – 29 November 2023) was a British Anglican bishop and academic who specialised in liturgy. He served as the principal of St John's College, Nottingham (1979–1985), Bishop of Aston (1985–1989) and Bishop of Woolwich (1996–2004).

== Early life and education ==
Buchanan was born on 9 August 1934 to Robert Ogilvie Buchanan and Kathleen Mary Buchanan (née Parnell). He was educated at Whitgift School, then an all-boys direct grant grammar school. After military service, he studied Literae Humaniores at Lincoln College, Oxford, graduating with a second class Bachelor of Arts (BA) degree; as per tradition, his BA was later promoted to a Master of Arts (MA Oxon) degree. As an athlete, he ran 440 yards both for the army and for Oxford. In 1959, he entered Tyndale Hall, Bristol, an Evangelical Anglican theological college, to train for ordained ministry.

In 1993, Buchanan was awarded a Lambeth Doctor of Divinity (DD) degree.

== Ordained ministry ==
Buchanan was ordained in the Church of England as a deacon in 1961 and as a priest in 1962. From 1961 to 1964, he served a curacy in the benefice of Cheadle (St Cuthbert and St Mary) in the Diocese of Chester.

In 1964, Buchanan joined the staff of the London College of Divinity (later known as St John's College, Nottingham), where he would spend the next 21 years. He was the librarian from 1964 to 1969, the registrar from 1969 to 1974, director of studies from 1974 to 1975, vice-principal from 1975 to 1978 and principal from 1979 to 1985. During this time, he was also a tutor in liturgy at the college. He was a member of the Church of England's liturgical commission from 1964 to 1986. From 1981 to 1985, he was an honorary canon of Southwell Minster.

In 1985, Buchanan was consecrated as a bishop. From 1985 to 1989, he was Bishop of Aston, a suffragan bishopric in the Diocese of Birmingham. He was an assistant bishop of the Diocese of Rochester from 1989 to 1996 and of the Diocese of Southwark from 1990 to 1991. He was a member of the House of Bishops of the General Synod from 1990 to 2004. He was also vicar of St Mark's Church, Gillingham, from 1991 to 1996. He then returned to episcopal ministry on a full-time basis and served as Bishop of Woolwich, an area bishop of the Diocese of Southwark, from 1996 to 2004.

In July 2004, Buchanan retired from full-time ministry. He was an honorary assistant bishop in the Diocese of Bradford from 2004 to 2014 and the Diocese of Ripon and Leeds from 2005 to 2014. From 2015 he was as an honorary assistant bishop in the Diocese of Leeds and was based in the Bradford Episcopal Area.

== Personal life and death ==
In 1963, Buchanan married. He died in Leeds on 29 November 2023, at the age of 89. He is survived by his wife and two children.

== Selected works ==
- Buchanan, Colin O., ed. (1968). Modern Anglican liturgies, 1958–1968. London: Oxford University Press. ISBN 978-0192134165.
- Buchanan, C. O. (1970). Growing into union: proposals for forming a united Church in England. London: S.P.C.K. ISBN 978-0281024872.
- Buchanan, Colin O., ed. (1975). Further Anglican liturgies, 1968-1975. Bramcote: Grove Books. ISBN 978-0901710666.
- Buchanan, Colin (1978). The end of the offertory: an Anglican study. Bramcote: Grove Books. ISBN 978-0905422350.
- Buchanan, Colin, ed. (1980). Anglican worship today: Collins illustrated guide to the Alternative Service Book 1980. London: Collins. ISBN 978-0005996614.
- Buchanan, Colin O., ed. (1985). Latest Anglican liturgies, 1975-1984. London: S.P.C.K. ISBN 978-0281041404.
- Buchanan, Colin (1994). Cut the connection: disestablishment and the Church of England. London, UK: Darton, Longman & Todd, Ltd. ISBN 978-0232520590.
- Buchanan, Colin (1998). Is the Church of England Biblical?: An Anglican Ecclesiology. London, UK: Darton, Longman & Todd, Ltd. ISBN 978-0232521344.
- Buchanan, Colin (2006). Historical Dictionary of Anglicanism. Lanham, Maryland: Scarecrow Press. ISBN 978-0810853270.
- Buchanan, Colin (2009). An Evangelical Among the Anglican Liturgists. London, UK: Society for Promoting Christian Knowledge. ISBN 978-0281060269.
- Buchanan, Colin, ed. (2011). Anglican eucharistic liturgies, 1985-2010. London: Canterbury Press. ISBN 978-1848250871.
- Buchanan Colin O. (2013) St John's College Nottingham: from Northwood to Nottingham: a history of 50 years, 1963-2013 by Colin Buchanan, Published by St John's College, Nottingham, 2013 ISBN 978-1-900920-22-3

Church of England titles
Preceded by Michael Whinney	Bishop of Aston; 1985–1989	Vacant Title next held by John Austin
Preceded by Peter Hall	Bishop of Woolwich; 1996–2004	Succeeded by Christopher Chessun
