= Robert Clark (priest) =

Robert James Vodden Clark (12 April 1907 – 25 September 1998) was Dean of Edinburgh from 1967 to 1976.

He was educated at Edinburgh Theological College and ordained in 1941. He was Curate at St Paul & St George, Edinburgh from 1941 to 1944 He held incumbencies in Fort William, Edinburgh and Falkirk before his time as Dean.

== Notes ==
Anglican Communion titles
Preceded by George Edward Martineau	Dean of Edinburgh; 1967 – 1976	Succeeded by Ernest William Brady
