= Listed buildings in Balderton =

Balderton is a civil parish in the Newark and Sherwood district of Nottinghamshire, England. The parish contains eight listed buildings that are recorded in the National Heritage List for England. Of these, one is listed at Grade I, the highest of the three grades, and the others are at Grade II, the lowest grade. The parish contains the village of Balderton and the surrounding area. All the listed buildings are near the centre of the village, and consist of a church, structures associated with one of the churches, and five houses.

== Key ==
Grade	Criteria
I	Buildings of exceptional interest, sometimes considered to be internationally important
II	Buildings of national importance and special interest

== Buildings ==
Name and location	Photograph	Date	Notes	Grade
St Giles' Church; 53.05532°N 0.77803°W		12th century	The church has been altered and extended through the centuries, including a restoration in 1882–83. It is built in stone with slate roofs, and consists of a nave, north and south aisles, north and south porches, a chancel with a north chapel, and a west steeple. The steeple has a tower with three stages, a plinth, buttresses, string courses, and an arched west doorway with a moulded surround. In the middle stage is a clock face on the north side, and above are arched bell openings, gargoyles, an embattled parapet with crocketed pinnacles, and a recessed crocketed spire with crocketed lucarnes. The doorways are Norman, the north the more elaborate, with the figure of a man in a round-headed surround above it.	I
77 Main Street; 53.05592°N 0.77731°W	—	Late 18th century	A house in painted brick with a pantile roof and brick coped gables. There are two storeys, a double depth plan, and four bays. The doorway has a porch and a casement window to the side, and the other windows are sashes with segmental heads.	II
79 Main Street; 53.05563°N 0.77718°W		Late 18th century	The house is in painted brick with a floor band, dentilled eaves and a pantile roof with a coped gable and kneelers. There are two storeys and an attic, and three bays. The central doorway has a moulded surround and a hood on brackets. It is flanked by bow windows, and in the upper floor are sash windows with segmental heads.	II
81 Main Street; 53.05562°N 0.77703°W		Late 18th century	The house is in painted brick with a floor band, dentilled eaves, and a pantile roof with coped gables and kneelers. There are two storeys and an attic. The doorway to the left has a flat surround and a slightly projected hood. Above the doorway is a casement window, and the other windows are sashes; all the windows have segmental heads.	II
74 Main Street; 53.05537°N 0.77717°W	—	c. 1800	The house is in painted brick with dentilled eaves and a pantile roof. There are two storeys and three bays. The doorway has a plain surround, the windows are horizontally-sliding sashes, and all the ground floor openings have segmental heads.	II
9 Bullpit Road; 53.05639°N 0.77864°W	—	Early 19th century	A red brick house with a floor band and a pantile roof. There are two storeys and three bays. The doorway has pilasters, a traceried fanlight, and a flat hood on brackets, and the windows are top-hung casements with segmental heads.	II
Methodist Church; 53.05514°N 0.78233°W		1907–08	The church is in stone with a tile roof, and consists of a nave, north and south aisles, north and south transepts, a chancel with an east vestry, and a northwest tower. The tower has two stages and a string course. In the lower stage is a north entrance with a Tudor arched doorway under a depressed arch, and a two-light west window. There is a two-light window in the upper stage, above which is an embattled parapet and a lead flèche.	II
Wall, gate piers and war memorial, Methodist Church; 53.05521°N 0.78228°W		1907–08	Along the front of the church grounds is a stone wall containing two pairs of coped trapezoidal gate piers. In the centre, the wall curves to accommodate a war memorial, which was added later to commemorate those lost in the First World War.	II
