= Susan Macdonald =

Scottish priest (born 1951)

The Very Reverend Susan Macdonald
- Dean of Edinburgh
- Church: Scottish Episcopal Church
- Diocese: Diocese of Edinburgh
- In office: 2012 to 2017
- Predecessor: John Armes
- Successor: Frances Burberry
- Other posts: Rector of Christ Church, Morningside, Edinburgh (2007–present)

Orders
- Ordination: 1996 (deacon); 1997 (priest)

Personal details
- Born: 11 July 1951 (age 75)
- Denomination: Anglicanism
- Education: Edinburgh Theological College

Susan Elizabeth Macdonald (born 11 July 1951) is a Scottish Anglican priest. She has been Rector of Christ Church, Morningside, Edinburgh since 2007. From 2012 to March 2017, she also served as the Dean of Edinburgh.

== Early life and education ==
Macdonald was born on 11 July 1951. In 1993, she entered Edinburgh Theological College, an Anglican theological college to train for ordination in the Scottish Episcopal Church.

== Ordained ministry ==
Macdonald was ordained in the Scottish Episcopal Church as a deacon in 1996 and as a priest in 1997. Between 1996 and 1998, she served her curacy as a non-stipendiary minister at St John the Evangelist, Jedburgh in the Diocese of Edinburgh. Then, from 1998 to 2001, she was a priest of St Peter's Church, Galashiels.

Macdonald was appointed to head her first church in 2001; that year, she became priest in charge of Gordon Chapel, Fochabers. From 2001 to 2004, she was also co-ordinator of Mission 21 for the Diocese of Moray, Ross and Caithness. She was a Canon of Inverness Cathedral from 2003 to 2004. She was Missioner for the Diocese of Aberdeen and Orkney from 2004 to 2007.

Since 2007, she has been the Rector of Christ Church, Morningside, Edinburgh. In March 2012, it was announced that she would be the next Dean of Edinburgh and therefore the first female dean in the Scottish Episcopal Church. She was installed as Dean on 13 May 2012 at a service in Edinburgh Cathedral. On 5 March 2017, she stepped down as dean and was succeeded by Frances Burberry.

Anglican Communion titles
Preceded by John Armes	Dean of Edinburgh; 2012 – 2017	Succeeded by Frances Burberry
