= Malcolm Martineau =

Scottish pianist (born 1960)

Malcolm Martineau OBE
- Born: 3 February 1960 (age 66); Edinburgh, Scotland
- Genres: Classical
- Occupation: Musician
- Instrument: Piano
- Labels: Signum Classics; Hyperion; Deutsche Grammophon; Linn; Decca; EMI
- Website: martineau.info

Malcolm Martineau, OBE (born 3 February 1960) is a Scottish pianist who is particularly noted as an accompanist.

== Early life and education ==
Martineau was born in Edinburgh to the pianist Hester Dickson Martineau and Canon George Martineau in 1960. He was an only child, but he had several half siblings from his parents' previous marriages. He was educated at George Watson's College. He studied at St Catharine's College, Cambridge between 1978 and 1981, and went on to study at the Royal College of Music between 1981 and 1984.

== Career ==
Malcolm Martineau has played in Paris, Amsterdam, Munich, Vienna, Milan, Berlin, throughout the United Kingdom and in North America accompanying many of the world's leading singers, including Thomas Allen, Dame Janet Baker, Barbara Bonney, Florian Boesch, Susan Graham, Della Jones, Simon Keenlyside, Tom Krause, Dame Felicity Lott, Ann Murray, Anne Sofie von Otter, Frederica von Stade, Sonya Yoncheva, Bryn Terfel, Sarah Walker and Ainhoa Arteta. Among many noted instrumentalists, he regularly accompanies clarinettist Emma Johnson. He has appeared at numerous festivals throughout the United Kingdom, has given many recitals for the BBC, and has appeared at the Aix-en-Provence, Vienna, Edinburgh and Salzburg festivals and in North and South America.

He accompanied the winners of the Lieder prize at the 1989 Cardiff Singer of the World competition, and at the 1990 Elly Ameling Award. He has accompanied at master classes at the Britten-Pears School in Snape for Dame Joan Sutherland, Elisabeth Schwarzkopf, Suzanne Danco, Ileana Cotrubaș and Kurt Equiluz. He presented his own series at St John's Smith Square of the complete songs of Debussy and Poulenc and a major Britten series at the Wigmore Hall (both broadcast by the BBC).

Recent recordings have included Schubert, Schumann and English song recitals with Bryn Terfel (for Deutsche Grammophon), Schubert and Strauss recitals with Simon Keenlyside (for EMI), recital records with Angela Gheorghiu (for Decca), Emma Johnson, Della Jones and Yvonne Kenny, the complete Faure songs with Sarah Walker and Tom Krause for CRD, the complete Britten Folk Songs for Hyperion, the complete Beethoven folksongs, and the song recital "Songs My Mother Taught Me", together with Magdalena Kožená, for Deutsche Grammophon.

His awards include the Walther Gruner International Lieder Competition. He was appointed Officer of the Order of the British Empire (OBE) in the 2016 New Year Honours for services to music and young singers.

== See also ==
- List of classical pianists
- List of people educated at George Watson's College
- List of people from Edinburgh
- List of Scottish musicians
- List of University of Cambridge people
