= Balderton =

Village and civil parish in Nottinghamshire, England

Coordinates: 53.05487°N 0.7727°W

- Village and civil parish
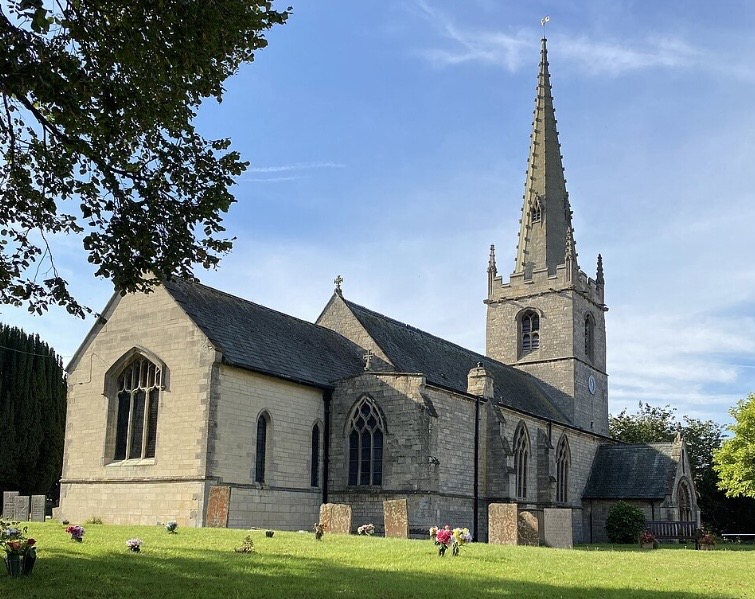
- St Giles Church

- Location within Nottinghamshire
- Interactive map of Balderton
- Area: 2.28 sq mi (5.9 km^{2})
- Population: 9,917 (2021 Census)
  - Density: 4,350/sq mi (1,680/km^{2})
- OS grid reference: SK 815515
  - London: 110 mi (180 km) SSE
- District: Newark and Sherwood
- Shire county: Nottinghamshire
- Region: East Midlands
- Country: England
- Sovereign state: United Kingdom
- Settlements: New Balderton; Old Balderton
- Post town: NEWARK
- Postcode district: NG24
- Dialling code: 01636
- Police: Nottinghamshire
- Fire: Nottinghamshire
- Ambulance: East Midlands
- UK Parliament: Newark
- Website: www.baldertonparishcouncil.gov.uk

Balderton is a village and civil parish in Nottinghamshire, England, which had a population of 9,757 at the 2011 census, increasing to 9,917 at the 2021 census.

Balderton is one of the largest villages in Nottinghamshire and now adjoins Newark-on-Trent to the north-west. Balderton is split into the historic village in the south-east and New Balderton.

== Geography ==
Balderton was once on the Great North Road. The busy A1 trunk road ran through the village, but now skirts Balderton to the east. The Great North Road near the site of Balderton New Hall (later Balderton Hospital) was called the Ramper. The East Coast Main Line railway between London and Edinburgh crosses the parish north of the village; the nearest stations are Newark Northgate and on the Nottingham–Lincoln line is Newark Castle.

The soil is mostly alluvial clays. Large deposits of gravel and sand were excavated in New Balderton, and the resulting pits were turned into a lakeside park. Gypsum is still mined nearby. The surrounding area is mostly agricultural, mixed arable and livestock.

== History ==
The village itself is probably of Anglo-Saxon origin and is mentioned in the Domesday Book of 1086. The Mercian countess Godiva, the wife of Earl Leofric, was lord in 1066 and also held property in the Manor of Newark nearby.

The name derives from the male personal name, Baldhere, and the Old English suffix -tun, meaning a farm or enclosure (a mound or ditch). The place-name is first recorded in the Domesday Book spelt Baldretone. In the Pope Nicholas IV taxation of 1291 it is written Baldirton.

From early medieval times till enclosure in 1766 the historic village was surrounded by three open fields: Sandfield to the north, Clayfield to the south, and Lowfield to the west.

Balderton's lords, the Busseys, lived in the area in William the Conqueror's era and held it until the reign of Elizabeth I. It subsequently descended to the Meers and Lascels. In the 1840s, when its population was a little over 1,000, large parts of the village were owned principally by the Duke of Newcastle, who was lord of the manor.

Two petitions of the fourteenth century show disputes with the nearby village of Claypole. In 1305 the bishop of Lincoln and the Busseys were hindering passage along the road to Newark market (National Archives S8/161/8038) and in 1324 the people of Claypole petitioned about Balderton people attacking jurors in relation to the Oldebrigg between Nottinghamshire and Lincolnshire (National Archives S8/39/1930). The will of John de Boston, a mercer of Newark, in 1443 left twenty shillings for the maintenance of the bridge between Balderton and Bennington; the bridge was called "fennebrige" (Brown (1907) 1.172).

Grapes were once grown at Balderton. In 1578 there were accusations of vines being cut down (Brown (1907) 1.188).

During the final siege of Newark in the English Civil War, Colonel Rossiter, a parliamentary commander, was camped at Balderton.

A Balderton enclosure act was passed in 1766.

London Road was built in 1767 as a turnpike (bypass) for the Great North Road (designated the A1 in 1923) which ran through Balderton and to the north of England. One of the former coach houses built to serve the turnpike is now a public house.

A windmill at Balderton was recorded as having been removed c. 1845. It was a postmill on a 2-storey roundhouse, with 2 spring and 2 common sails. A windmill was recorded on the Old Series Ordnance Survey map on a site close to Spring Lane (grid reference SK832506).

In 1901 Simpson and Co opened their pump manufacturing works at Balderton; it was subsequently Worthington Simpson in 1917 and from 2001 Flowserve Pumps Ltd. Their products are used in the chemical, water, and pharmaceutical industries. Part of the site is now earmarked for housing.

Pre-Roman and Roman sites have been noted in English Heritage's Pastscape records for Balderton, along with two Civil War sites.

== Administration ==
Since 1894 Balderton has been governed at the village level by a parish council. It has 15 members elected from four parish wards (South, North, Rowan and Milton). Land owned by Balderton Parish Council includes the cemetery and Garden of Remembrance on Belvoir Road and Mount Road, Coronation Street playing field, Balderton Lake, and the Village Centre on Coronation Street.

== Architecture ==
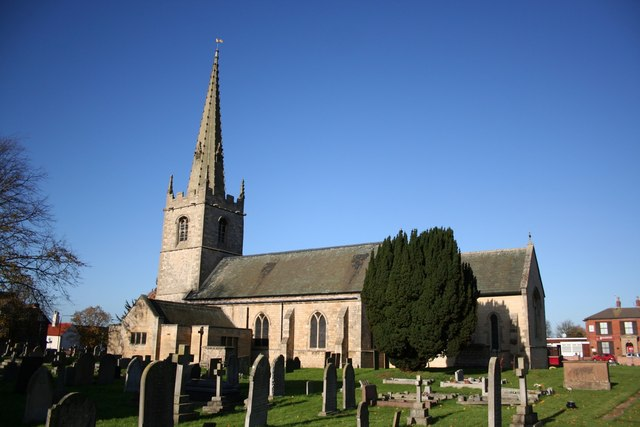
St Giles' Church, Balderton

The Parish Church of St Giles (diocese of Southwell) was originally built in the 12th century and enlarged considerably in the 13th and 14th centuries. Two Romanesque-style porch doorways, dating from about 1140, face north and south. The more imposing north entrance is topped by a niche containing a figure, possibly St Giles, although this was probably added as late as the 19th century. The north and south arcades are of 13th and 14th century date respectively, and the font is octagonal and early 14th century. The rood screen dates from about 1475, whilst the numerous bench ends are of an uncommon symmetrical design. The church has a substantial spire at the west end of the building containing a peal of eight bells. The lower part of the tower is 13th century but the upper parts must be later, either late 14th or early 15th century.

== Schools ==
At the beginning of the 20th century education in Balderton was organised in a senior school in Main Street and a primary school on London Road, the latter opening in 1903.

A few children from the village went from the primary school to the grammar schools in Newark, the numbers increasing after the Education Act 1944. Some children at thirteen went to the technical college in Newark.

=== John Hunt Primary and Nursery School ===
This is a school resulting from a merging of the John Hunt Infant & Nursery School and the John Hunt Junior School, the new school opening in September 2008 John Hunt Primary and Nursery School on London Road.

=== Chuter Ede ===
A second primary school, Chuter Ede, opened in 1964 in Main Street, and in its present buildings in Wolfit Avenue in 1967. A second site opened in 2012 in Fernwood, a new housing estate.

=== Highfields ===
A private preparatory school, Highfields, is on the border with Newark.

=== The Newark Academy ===
Secondary education for those aged eleven to eighteen is at The Newark Academy.

The institution was previously known as The Grove Comprehensive. In September 2008 the Grove School joined with the Newark High School, and today the former Newark High School is used as a sixth form centre for the school. In 2012 the Grove School converted to academy status and was renamed the Newark Academy. The school was rebuilt in a £20 million project completed in 2016 after multiple delays.

== Notable people ==
- Somerset Walpole (1854–1929), an Anglican priest, bishop, teacher and author.
- Sir Donald Wolfit, CBE (1902–1968), an English actor-manager
- Cyril Poole (1921–1996) played both professional cricket and football, died in Balderton

== Community and leisure ==
=== Balderton Lake ===
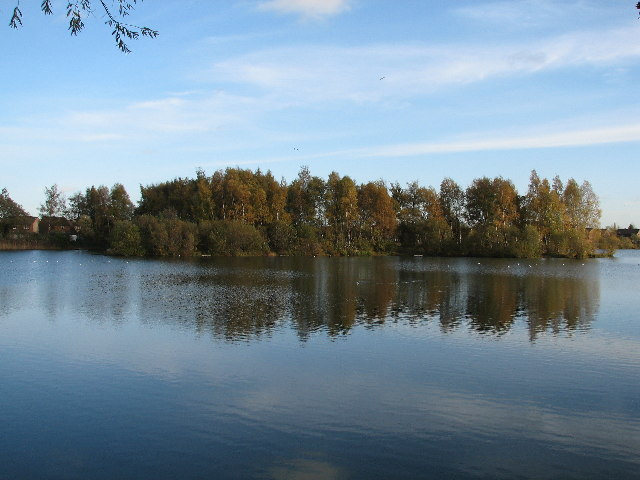
Balderton Lake

Balderton Lake is owned by the Balderton Parish Council, who maintain the walkway around the lake, as well as the wooded area and grasslands. There is a viewing area with access for disabled people. A number of trees around the lake were planted early in the 1990s as part of a project undertaken by John Hunt Infant School. A local fishing club rent fishing rights from the council, and are responsible for taking care of the water, while the charity Sustrans have resurfaced the old Newark-Bottesford railway line bordering the lake, resulting in several miles of walking and cycle track. It is now surrounded by a large number of houses.

=== Grove Leisure Centre ===
Until the opening of the Newark Sports and Fitness Centre in May 2016, Balderton was the location of a leisure centre serving the local community, offering two swimming pools, gym facilities, squash courts and other sporting amenities.

The vacant buildings fell victim to a suspected arson attack in September 2017.

=== Licensed premises ===
- Chesters (formerly the New Cock Inn)
- The Grove
- Rose and Crown

== Football teams ==
RHP are the main football team. Grove Rangers junior football club also play in Balderton. Newark Town sports clubs also provide football teams for all ages.

Balderton Old Boys also are a local football team.

== Balderton New Hall ==
A large private house on the southern outskirts of the village built 1840 for Thomas Spragging Godfrey. Godfrey became sheriff of Nottinghamshire in 1853 (Times 9 February 1853, page 3) and died at Balderton Hall on 7 September 1877. The hall was advertised for sale in the Times in November 1880: house, stables, cottages for gardener and groom, and 135 acres (0.55 km^{2}), the remaining 425 acres (1.72 km^{2}) to be sold separately.

It was bought in 1930 by Nottinghamshire county council for conversion to a mental hospital but work on this stopped during World War II. The hospital was opened for patients in 1957 and closed in 1993. There is now housing on the former hospital site and nearby is the Fernwood business park.

== RAF Balderton ==
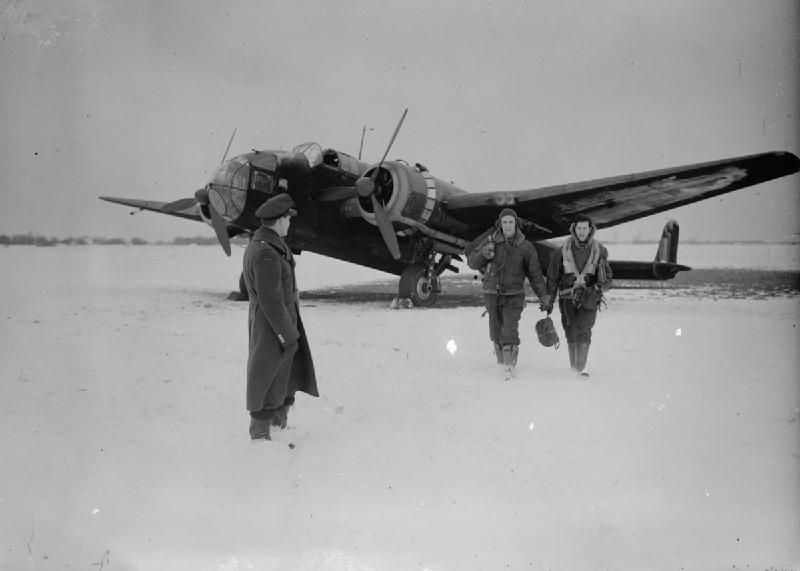
A wintry scene at RAF Balderton in 1942

Balderton airfield opened in June 1941 with a grass surface over stiff clay. It was used by the Royal Air Force (RAF), Royal Canadian Air Force (RCAF) and United States Army Air Forces (USAAF). During World War II it was used primarily as a troop carrier transport airfield and after for munitions storage before it finally closed. RAF Balderton airfield was also used by Sir Frank Whittle and his flight trials unit during development of the jet engine in 1943-1944. Whittle lived and worked on his engine designs at Balderton Old Hall on Main Street.

== See also ==
- Listed buildings in Balderton

== Bibliography ==
- Brown, Cornelius (1879) The Annals of Newark upon Trent: H. Sotheran, London and S. Whiles, Newark (reprinted 2005). Available for free download at www.archive.org/
- Brown, Cornelius (1904, 1907) A History of Newark on Trent: S. Whiles, Newark (reprinted 1995, two volumes)
- WEA/Balderton Local History Group (1992) Balderton in Times Past
- Balderton Parish Council (1994) Balderton Updated
