= Church of St Michael and All Saints, Edinburgh =

Church of St Michael and All Saints
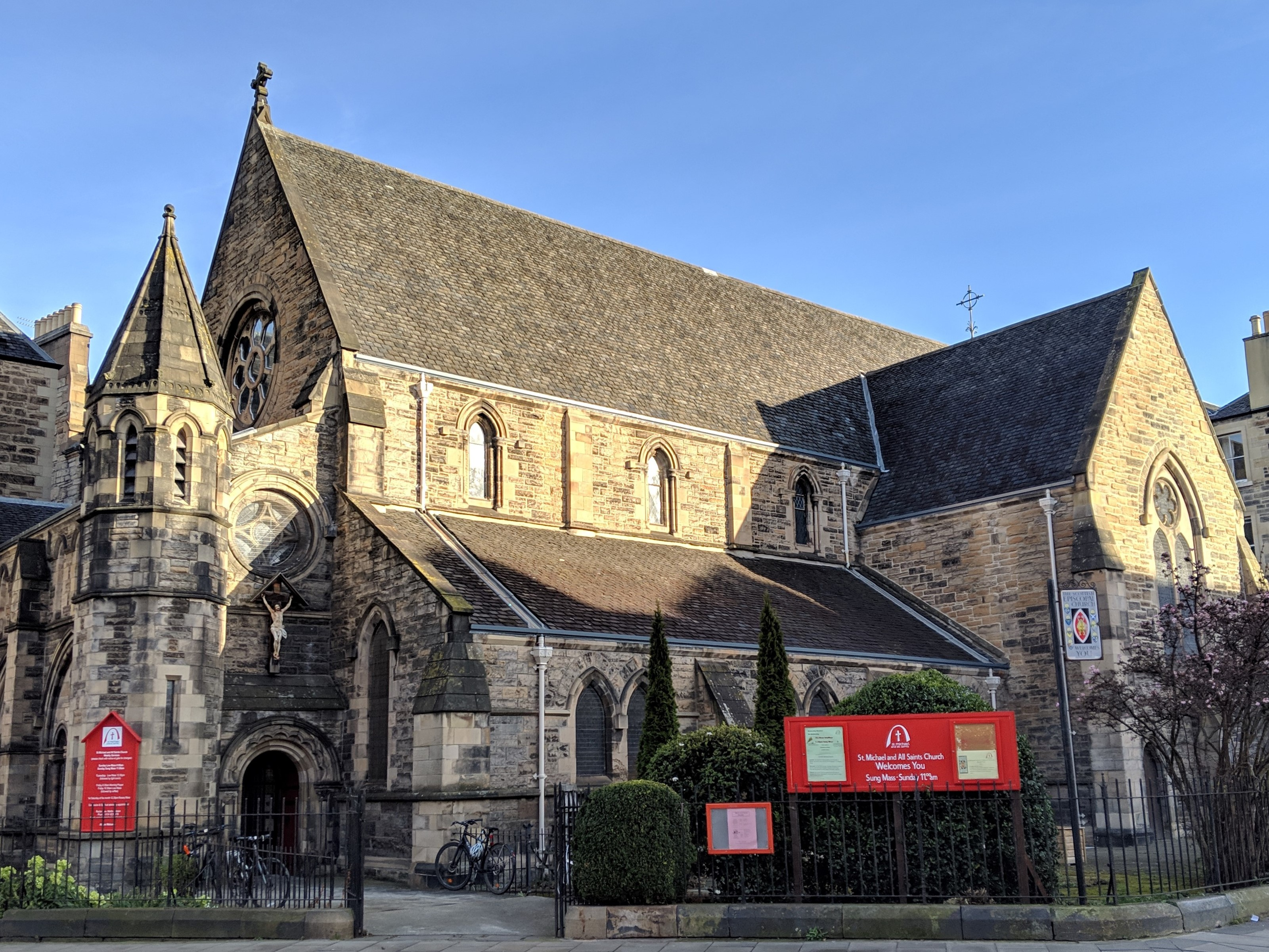
- View from Brougham Street
- Church of St Michael and All Saints
- 55.9433°N 3.2014°W
- Location: 28 Brougham Street, Edinburgh, EH3 9JH
- Country: Scotland
- Denomination: Scottish Episcopal Church
- Churchmanship: Anglo-Catholic
- Website: Church website

History
- Status: Active

Architecture
- Functional status: church

Administration
- Diocese: Diocese of Edinburgh

Clergy
- Rector: The Revd Oliver Brewer-Lennon

The Church of St Michael and All Saints is an Episcopal church in Edinburgh, Scotland. The church stands in the Anglo-Catholic tradition, and is a Category A listed building.

== History ==
Having been designed by Sir Robert Rowand Anderson, the main part of the church was built from 1866 to 1867. The west end was built from 1866 to 1867, and a Lady Chapel was added in 1897.

On 14 December 1970, the church was designated a category A listed building, signifying a building of national or international importance.

The church has hosted concerts and masses as part of the Edinburgh Festival Fringe, the world's largest arts festival.

== Notable clergy ==
Curate

- 1913 to 1914: Arnold Spencer-Smith

List of rectors:

- 1965 to 1971: Ernest Brady
- 1971 to 1984: Gordon Reid
- 1984 to 1990: A. Emsley Nimmo
- 1990 to 1995: Timothy A. R. Cole
- 1995 to 2011: Kevin Pearson
- 2011 to 2013: David Charles Standen
- 2014 to 2023: Martin Robson
- 2023 to 2024: Paul Burrows (Interim)
- 2024 to present: Oliver Brewer-Lennon
