= Malcolm Clark (priest) =

Scottish Episcopalian priest

Malcolm Aiken Clark, FSA Scot (3 October 1905 – 1 December 2002) was Dean of Edinburgh from 1982 to 1985.

He was educated at the High School of Glasgow and Lichfield Theological College. and He was ordained Deacon in 1934 and priest in 1935. After a curacy at St John, Greenock he held incumbencies at All Saints Lockerbie, and All Saints, Langholm. During World War II he was a Chaplain in the RAFVR. Afterwards he was Priest in charge at St Mary, Dalkeith and then Rector of the Good Shepherd, Murrayfield before his time as Dean.

Like his motto ‘Sure and Steadfast’ he was still conducting services well into his 90s at St Vincent's Chapel, Edinburgh. His wife was called Chicinna and he had three children.

== Notes ==
Anglican Communion titles
Preceded by Ernest William Brady	Dean of Edinburgh; 1982 – 1985	Succeeded by Ernest William Brady
