= Frances Burberry =

Scottish Anglican priest

Frances Sheila Burberry (born 1960) is a British Anglican priest. Since 5 March 2017 she has been the Dean of Edinburgh in the Scottish Episcopal Church. She has also been a chaplain of the University of Edinburgh since 2006 and rector of St Ninian's Church, Edinburgh, since 2011.

Anglican Communion titles
Preceded by Susan Macdonald	Dean of Edinburgh; 2017 – present	Incumbent
