= Kenneth Carey (bishop) =

Scottish bishop

The Right Reverend Kenneth Carey QHC, D.D.
- Bishop of Edinburgh
- Church: Scottish Episcopal Church
- Diocese: Edinburgh
- Elected: 1961
- In office: 1961–1975
- Predecessor: Kenneth Warner
- Successor: Alastair Haggart

Orders
- Ordination: 1934 by Arthur Winnington-Ingram
- Consecration: 29 September 1961 by Thomas Hannay

Personal details
- Born: 6 April 1908
- Died: 3 January 1979 (aged 70)
- Denomination: Anglican
- Parents: Godfrey Mohun Carey and Agnes Charlotte Carey
- Education: University of Oxford

Kenneth Moir Carey QHC (6 April 1908 – 3 January 1979) was an Anglican bishop. From 1948 to 1961, he was Principal of Westcott House, Cambridge. From 1961 to 1975, he was the bishop of Edinburgh.

== Early life ==
Carey was born on 6 April 1908, educated at Marlborough and Exeter College, Oxford He graduated from the University of Oxford with a third class honours Bachelor of Arts (BA) degree.

== Ordained ministry ==
He was ordained deacon in 1932 and priest in 1934. He began his career as Chaplain of Oxford House, Bethnal Green, after which he was curate of St Andrew's, Handsworth. From 1938 to 1944 he was Vicar of Spennymoor when he became General Secretary for the Central Advisory Council of Training for the Ministry. In 1948 he became Principal of Westcott House, Cambridge and in 1961 Bishop of Edinburgh.

An Honorary Chaplain to the Queen, he retired in 1975 and died on 3 January 1979.

Religious titles
| Preceded by Kenneth Charles Harman Warner | Bishop of Edinburgh; 1961 –1975 | Succeeded by Alastair Iain Macdonald Haggart |
