= Roderick Mackay =

Roderick John Mackay (20 July 1874 - 24 November 1956) was Dean of Edinburgh from 1939 to 1954.

He was educated at Hatfield College, Durham. He was awarded a Theological Scholarship in 1899, the Barry Scholarship in 1901, and won the Theological Prize the same year. He was also elected President of the Durham Union, serving for Michaelmas term of 1901. He served curacies in Pallion, Greenock and Edinburgh. He was Priest in Charge of St Matthew, Edinburgh from 1904 to 1909; Rector of St Martin, Edinburgh from 1909 to 1921 and of St Peter, Edinburgh from 1921 to 1954 (also Synod Clerk for the Diocese of Edinburgh from 1934 to 1939).

== Notes ==
Anglican Communion titles
Preceded by William Perry	Dean of Edinburgh; 1939 – 1954	Succeeded by David Brownfield Porter
