= Hester Dickson Martineau =

Scottish pianist (1924–2015)

- Born: Hester Dickson; 22 July 1924; Edinburgh, Scotland
- Died: 10 December 2015 (aged 91); Edinburgh, Scotland
- Education: University of Edinburgh
- Occupation: pianist

Hester Dickson Martineau (22 July 1924 – 10 December 2015) was a celebrated Scottish pianist and pedagogue who was born in Edinburgh.

== Early life ==
Her mother Mari was married to lawyer John Douglas Dickson, son of James Douglas Hamilton Dickson. Hester was one of four children in the family. She came from a musical family, and her father was a gifted musician who was close friends with Sir Adrian Boult and Donald Tovey.

== Education and career ==
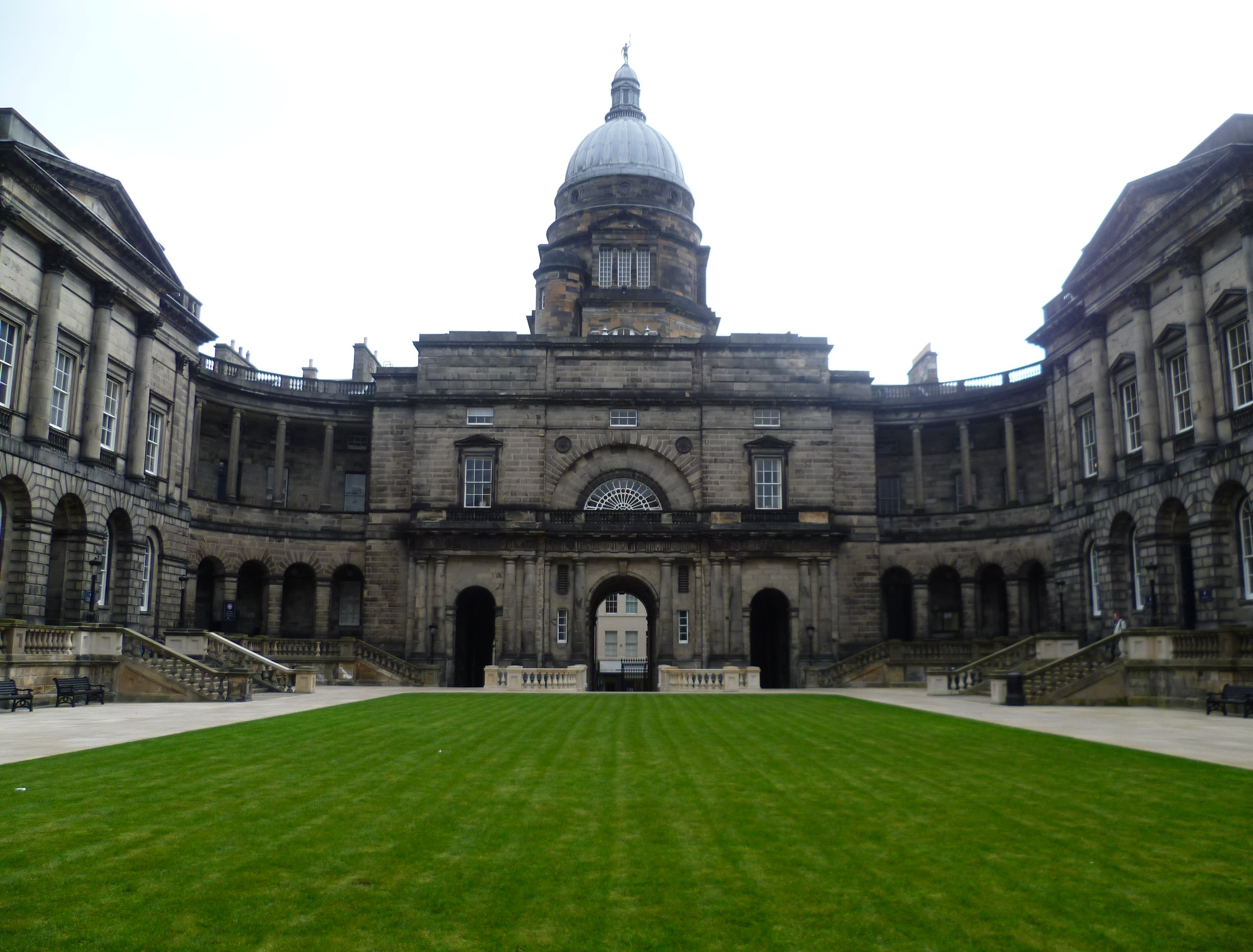
University of Edinburgh, where Dickson Martineau studied for her BMus

Dickson Martineau graduated with a BMus at the University of Edinburgh before attending the Royal Academy of Music In London, where she studied under Harold Craxton. In 1969 she became a teacher at the Royal Scottish Academy of Music and Drama, now known as the Royal Conservatoire of Scotland, retiring at age 90.

Dickson Martineau and her sister Joan, a cellist, would often perform at Wednesday lunchtime concerts held at the Scottish National Gallery in Edinburgh, and hosted by Tertia Liebenthal. Joan appeared as a cellist at the 699th of these concerts, during which Tertia died, following her announcement that the 700th would feature Peter Pears and Benjamin Britten.

== Personal life ==
Dickson Martineau was married twice. Her first marriage was to Laurence Poole, with whom she had a son, Adrian. She was widowed at a young age, and remarried in 1959 to Canon George Martineau, with whom she had another son, Malcolm. Her husband died in 1969.

Her son, Malcolm Martineau, is an accomplished pianist and accompanist who performs regularly at the Edinburgh International Festival.

Dickson Martineau died on 10 December 2015 aged 91 at Cluny Lodge care home in Edinburgh.

== Tribute ==
On the first anniversary of her death, a concert was held in celebration of her life at the Queen's Hall in Edinburgh. The concert featured John Mark Ainsley, Lorna Anderson, Katie Bird, Karen Cargill, Nigel Cliffe, Rebecca Evans, Warren Gillespie, Janis Kelly, Jamie MacDougall, Patricia MacMahon, Ann Murray, Christopher Nairne, Linda Ormiston, Nicky Spence, Damien Thantrey, and Catherine Wyn-Rogers. The orchestra was directed by Tim Dean and led by Ruth Crouch, and organised by her son Malcolm.
