= Bishop of Aston =

Anglican ecclesial title

The Bishop of Aston is an episcopal title used by a suffragan bishop of the Church of England Diocese of Birmingham, in the Province of Canterbury, England. The title takes its name after Aston, an area of the City of Birmingham; the See was erected under the Suffragans Nomination Act 1888, by Order in Council dated 15 July 1954. The suffragan bishop of Aston assists the diocesan bishop of Birmingham, sharing Episcopal oversight throughout the diocese.

Esther Prior has been the Bishop of Aston since February 2025; the bishop's residence is Bishop's Lodge, Sutton Coldfield.

== List of bishops ==
Bishops of Aston
From	Until	Incumbent	Notes
1954	1961	Michael Parker	Translated to Bradford.
1962	1972	David Porter	
1972	1982	Mark Green	
1982	1985	Michael Whinney	Translated to Southwell.
1985	1989	Colin Buchanan	Translated to Woolwich.
1989	1992	no appointment	
1992	2005	John Austin	
2005	2008	no appointment	
2008	2014	Andrew Watson	Translated to Guildford, 24 November 2014.
29 September 2015	2024	Anne Hollinghurst	Resigned September 2024.
2025	present	Esther Prior	Consecrated 27 February 2025.
