= Michael Whinney =

- Bishop of Southwell
- Diocese: Diocese of Southwell
- In office: 1985–1988
- Predecessor: Denis Wakeling
- Successor: Patrick Harris
- Other posts: Acting Bishop of Birmingham (2005–2006); Honorary assistant bishop in Birmingham (1995–2017); Canon residentiary at Birmingham Cathedral (1992–1995) & Assistant Bishop of Birmingham (1988–1995); Bishop of Aston (1982–1985)

Orders
- Ordination: c. 1957 (deacon); c. 1958 (priest)
- Consecration: c. 1982

Personal details
- Born: 8 July 1930
- Died: 3 February 2017 (aged 86)
- Denomination: Anglican
- Parents: Humphrey Whinney & Evelyn Low
- Spouse: Veronica Webster (m. 1958)
- Children: 2 sons; 1 daughter
- Profession: Teacher
- Education: Pembroke College, Cambridge

Michael Humphrey Dickens Whinney (8 July 1930 – 3 February 2017) was a Church of England bishop who served in two episcopal posts; he was also a great-great-grandson of Charles Dickens.

He was born in Chelsea, London on 8 July 1930 and educated at Charterhouse School and Pembroke College, Cambridge (he became a Cambridge Master of Arts {MA(Cantab)}); he later gained a Master of Sacred Theology (STM) degree from General Theological Seminary. He was ordained in 1957 after an earlier career as an accountant. His first ministry position was as a curate at Rainham after which he held two posts in Bermondsey, firstly as priest in charge of the Cambridge University Mission Settlement and later as the vicar of St James' with Christ Church. He became the Archdeacon of Southwark before being ordained to the episcopate in 1982 as the Bishop of Aston. After three years he was translated to be the Bishop of Southwell where he remained until 1988. Taking temporary early retirement from Southwell with an injury in early 1988, he returned to Birmingham for a sabbatical year. In February 1989 (aged 59 and long before retirement age), he was invited to become an Assistant Bishop of Birmingham and Canon of the Cathedral. In retirement he continued to serve as an honorary assistant bishop in Birmingham.

He died on 3 February 2017 at the age of 86.

Church of England titles
Preceded by Mark Green	Bishop of Aston; 1982–1985	Succeeded by Colin Buchanan
Preceded by Denis Wakeling	Bishop of Southwell; 1985–1988	Succeeded by Patrick Harris
