= William Perry (Scottish priest) =

William Perry (died 1948) was an Anglican priest.

He was educated at the University of Aberdeen, he was ordained after a period of study at Edinburgh Theological College in 1894. He served curacies in Greenock and Edinburgh. He was Vice-Principal of Edinburgh Theological College from 1897 to 1899. He held incumbencies in Alloa, Stirling and Selkirk; and was Provost of St Andrew's Cathedral, Aberdeen from 1910 to 1912. He was Principal of the College of the Scottish Episcopal Church from 1912 to 1929; a Lecturer in Systematic Theology at Edinburgh University from 1921 (until his death); Dean of Edinburgh and Rector of Colinton from 1929 to 1939; Rector of Buckland, Gloucestershire from 1939 to 1940; and Canon in Residence at Edinburgh Cathedral from 1940 to 1947.

A prolific author, he died on 30 April 1948.

== Notes ==
Anglican Communion titles
Preceded by James Myers Danson	Provost of St Andrew's Cathedral, Aberdeen; 1910– 1912	Succeeded by Henry Erskine Hill
Preceded by Harry Seymour Reid	Dean of Edinburgh; 1929 – 1939	Succeeded by Roderick John Mackay
