= George Martineau =

George Edward Martineau (18 January 1905 – 3 January 1969) was Dean of Edinburgh from 1962 to 1967.

== Life ==
Martineau was born in 1905, Son of Alfred Martineau, Advocate, Aberdeen, and Maud Martineau. He was educated at Uppingham School and St John's College, Cambridge and Ripon College Cuddesdon; and ordained in 1931. After curacies in Chesterfield and Edinburgh he held incumbencies in new Mills, Falkirk and Jedburgh before his time as Dean.

He married first, Christian Burnett, daughter of John George Burnett OBE. After Christian's death he married second in 1959, pianist Hester Dickson Martineau. They both had previous children, but they shared in a new son Malcolm Martineau, also a noted pianist.

== Notes ==
Anglican Communion titles
Preceded by David Brownfield Porter	Dean of Edinburgh; 1962–1967	Succeeded by Robert James Vodden Clark
