= Esther Prior =

Malawian-English Anglican bishop (born 1973)

Esther Tamisa Prior (born 1973) is a Malawian Anglican bishop in England. Since 2025, she has served as Bishop of Aston, a suffragan bishop in the Church of England's Diocese of Birmingham.

== Biography ==
Esther was born in Malawi in 1973. She grew up in Zimbabwe and came to the UK in 1999. She studied for the priesthood at Trinity College, Bristol and was ordained deacon in 2003 and priest in 2004. After curacies in Redland and Deptford, she has served as a School Chaplain, a Young Offenders’ Prison Chaplain, a Team Vicar in Farnborough and as vicar of Egham.

On 27 February 2025, she was consecrated as a bishop during a service at Canterbury Cathedral by Stephen Cottrell, Archbishop of York.
