= Dagmar Winter (bishop) =

Bishop in the Church of England (born 1963)

The Right Reverend Dagmar Winter
- Bishop of Edinburgh
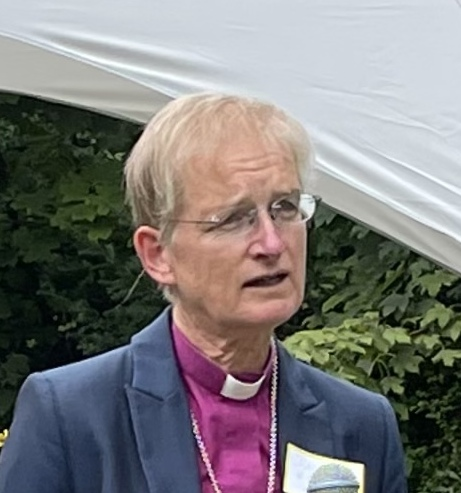
- Winter in 2021
- Diocese: Diocese of Edinburgh
- In office: 2026 to present
- Predecessor: John Armes

Orders
- Ordination: 29 June 1996 (deacon); 28 June 1997 (priest) by Michael Nazir-Ali
- Consecration: 3 July 2019 by Justin Welby

Personal details
- Born: 1963 (age 62–63)
- Denomination: Anglicanism

Dagmar Winter (born 1963) is a British Anglican bishop. From 2026, she has served as Bishop of Edinburgh in the Scottish Episcopal Church. From 2019 to 2026, she was Bishop of Huntingdon, a suffragan bishop in the Church of England's Diocese of Ely. She was previously priest in charge of a large, rural parish in Northumbria (2006–2015), and Rector of Hexham Abbey (2015–2019).

== Early life and education ==
Winter was born in 1965 and is of British and Swiss-German descent. She studied at the University of Aberdeen in Scotland, and the University of Erlangen–Nuremberg and Heidelberg University in Germany. She trained for ordination at Herborn Theological Seminary from 1993 to 1996, during which she also completed a Doctor of Theology (DrTheol) degree.

== Ordained ministry ==
Winter was made a deacon at Petertide 1996 (29 June), and ordained a priest the Petertide following year (28 June 1997) – both times by Michael Nazir-Ali, Bishop of Rochester, at Rochester Cathedral. She served her curacy at St Mark's Church, Bromley in the Diocese of Rochester. From 1999 to 2006, she was deanery training officer and associate vicar of Hexham Abbey in the Diocese of Newcastle.

From 2006 to 2015, she was priest in charge of Kirkwhelpington, Kirkharle, Kirkheaton and Cambo; a group of rural parishes in Northumberland. During this time she held a number of additional appointments: Diocesan Officer for Rural Affairs in the Diocese of Newcastle (2006–2015), Area Dean of Morpeth (2011-2013), and adviser for women's ministry to the Bishop of Newcastle (2012-2019). She was made an honorary canon of Newcastle Cathedral in 2011. In 2015, she returned to Hexham Abbey having been appointed Rector of Hexham.

Since 2005, Winter has been an elected member of the General Synod of the Church of England. She has served on the Rural Group, the Mission and Public Affairs Committee of the Church of England, and the Meissen Committee (Evangelical Church in Germany–Church of England relations).

=== Episcopal ministry ===
In May 2019, it was announced that Winter would be the next Bishop of Huntingdon, a suffragan bishop in the Diocese of Ely. She was consecrated as a bishop at St Paul's Cathedral on 3 July 2019 by Justin Welby, Archbishop of Canterbury. In the vacancy following Stephen Conway's translation from Ely to Lincoln, Winter is also acting diocesan Bishop of Ely.

On 14 February 2026, she was elected as Bishop of Edinburgh in the Scottish Episcopal Church. She was translated to the Diocese of Edinburgh and installed as bishop on 30 May.

=== Views ===
In November 2023, she was one of 44 Church of England bishops who signed an open letter supporting the use of the Prayers of Love and Faith (i.e. blessings for same-sex couples) and called for "Guidance being issued without delay that includes the removal of all restrictions on clergy entering same-sex civil marriages, and on bishops ordaining and licensing such clergy".
