= David Porter (bishop) =

English bishop (1906–1993)

David Brownfield Porter (10 May 1906 – 14 May 1993) was the suffragan Bishop of Aston from 1962 to 1972.

He was born in Wandsworth, London and educated at Hertford College, Oxford. He studied for ordination at Wycliffe Hall, Oxford before a curacy in Leeds (at Wrangthorn St Augustine). He was made a deacon at Michaelmas 1929 (22 September) at his title church and ordained a priest in Advent 1930 (19 December) at Ripon Minster — both times by Edward Burroughs, Bishop of Ripon. From 1935 — in which year he announced his engagement — he was Vicar of All Saints', Highfield, Oxfordshire and then from 1943 of St Cuthbert's Church, Darlington. From there he became Rector of Church of St John the Evangelist, Edinburgh and from 1954 to 1961 Dean of Edinburgh. In 1962 he was appointed suffragan Bishop of Aston, where he remained until retirement. He was consecrated a bishop on 2 February 1962, by Michael Ramsey, Archbishop of Canterbury, at Westminster Abbey. In 1972 he retired to Brockhampton, Gloucestershire, where lived until his death.

Religious titles
| Preceded by Roderick Mackay | Dean of Edinburgh; 1954–1961 | Succeeded by George Martineau |
| Preceded by Michael Parker | Bishop of Aston; 1962–1972 | Succeeded by Mark Green |
