= Mark Green (bishop) =

Mark Green MC (28 March 1917 – 2 August 2009) was the suffragan Bishop of Aston from 1972 to 1982. He was born into an ecclesiastical family and educated at Rossall School and Lincoln College, Oxford. He studied for ordination at Ripon College Cuddesdon before a curacy at St Catherine's Gloucester. After World War II service as a chaplain to the Forces he held incumbencies at Hull and Acaster Malbis. He was then Rural Dean of Ainsty before elevation to the episcopate. He retired in 1982.

Church of England titles
Preceded by David Brownfield Porter	Bishop of Aston; 1972–1982	Succeeded by Michael Humphrey Dickens Whinney
