= St Giles' Church, Balderton =

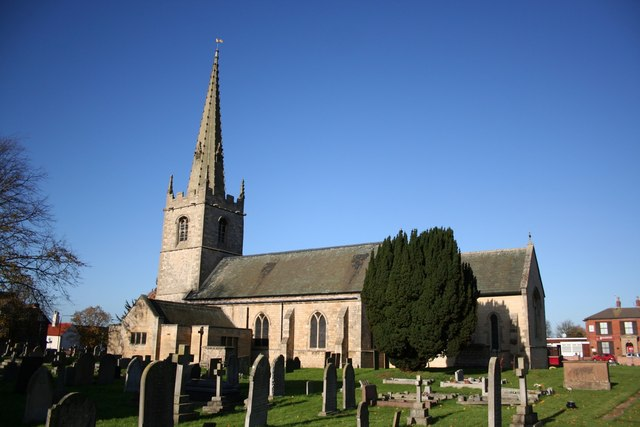
- St Giles' Church, Balderton
- St Giles' Church, Balderton
- 53°3′16.11″N 0°46′40.99″W
- OS grid reference: SK 81999 51589
- Location: Balderton
- Country: England
- Denomination: Church of England
- Website: https://bbc-churches.org.uk/

History
- Dedication: St Giles

Architecture
- Heritage designation: Grade I listed

Administration
- Diocese: Diocese of Southwell and Nottingham
- Archdeaconry: Newark
- Deanery: Newark and Southwell
- Parish: Balderton

St Giles' Church, Balderton, is a Grade I listed parish church in the Church of England in Balderton, Nottinghamshire, England.

== History ==
The church dates from the 12th century and was restored in 1880. Two Romanesque-style porch doorways, dating from about 1140, face north and south. The more imposing north entrance is topped by a niche containing a figure, possibly St Giles, although this was probably added as late as the 19th century. The north and south arcades are of 13th and 14th century date respectively and the font is octagonal and early 14th century. The rood screen dates from about 1475 and the numerous bench ends are of an uncommon symmetrical design. The church has a substantial spire at the west end of the building containing a peal of eight bells.

It is part of a benefice with All Saints' Church, Barnby in the Willows and All Saints' Church, Coddington.

== Organ ==
An organ by Brindley & Foster was installed in 1912. It was replaced by Henry Groves & Son in 2010 reusing some of the original pipes and adding some new. The console is now on a mobile platform that can be moved into the nave. A specification of the organ can be found on the Henry Groves & Son website. The organ is registered on the National Pipe Organ Register.

== See also ==
- Grade I listed buildings in Nottinghamshire
- Listed buildings in Balderton
