= John Armes =

British bishop (born 1955)

The Right Reverend John Armes
- Bishop of Edinburgh
- Church: Scottish Episcopal Church
- Diocese: Edinburgh
- Elected: 11 February 2012
- Installed: 12 May 2012
- Term ended: 31 August 2025
- Predecessor: Brian Smith
- Successor: Position vacant
- Other post: Acting Bishop of Aberdeen and Orkney (Sept 2022–Oct 2023)

Orders
- Ordination: 1979 (deacon); 1980 (priest)
- Consecration: 2012

Personal details
- Born: John Andrew Armes; 10 September 1955 (age 71) Hammersmith, London, England
- Spouse: Clare
- Children: 4
- Occupation: Bishop
- Education: Cambridge University

John Andrew Armes (born 10 September 1955) was the Bishop of Edinburgh in the Scottish Episcopal Church.

== Education ==
Armes was educated at Sidney Sussex College, Cambridge (BA, 1977, proceeding MA, 1981), before further studies at Salisbury Theological College (1977) and the University of Manchester (PhD, 1996).

== Ordained ministry ==
Ordained to the Anglican ministry as a deacon in 1979, Armes became a priest in 1980. After a curacy at Walney Island (1979–82) he was chaplain for agriculture in the Diocese of Carlisle (1982–86). He joined the team ministry of Greystoke, Matterdale and Mungrisdale (1982–86), becoming vicar of Watermillock, (1982–86). Appointed vicar of Whitworth, Lancashire (1986–88), then team rector (1988–94), he also served as chaplain to the University of Manchester (1986–94). He became priest-in-charge of Goodshaw and Crawshawbooth (1994–98) and Area Dean of Rossendale (1994–98). His next appointments were as rector of St John's, Edinburgh (1998–2012), and Dean of Edinburgh (2010–12).

Elected a bishop on 11 February 2012, Armes was consecrated and installed at St Mary's Cathedral, Edinburgh, on 12 May 2012. In addition, he was acting Bishop of Aberdeen and Orkney from September 2022 to October 2023; this was due to Anne Dyer being suspended as bishop. Armes retired as bishop on the 31st August 2025, after a farewell service of choral evensong at St Mary's Cathedral, Edinburgh.

== Personal life ==
Armes married Clare Newby in 1983; they have four children. His interests include theatre, cinema, walking, reading novels, watching sport, travel and humour.

== Sources ==
- Bertie, David M. (2000). Scottish Episcopal Clergy, 1689–2000. Edinburgh: T & T Clark. ISBN 0567087468.

Scottish Episcopal Church titles
Preceded by Kevin Pearson	Dean of Edinburgh; 2004 to 2012	Succeeded by Susan Macdonald
Preceded by Brian Smith	Bishop of Edinburgh; 2012 to 2025	Succeeded by Position vacant
