= Priory Church, South Queensferry =

Priory Church Queensferry
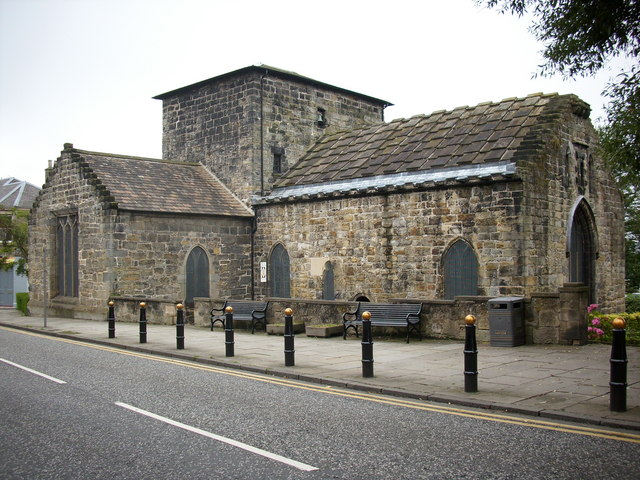

- Location of the Priory Church in City of Edinburgh
- 55.9909°N 3.3982°W
- Location: South Queensferry, Edinburgh
- Country: Scotland
- Denomination: Scottish Episcopal Church
- Previous denomination: Carmelite, Church of Scotland
- Website: priorychurch.org

History
- Dedication: St Mary of Mount Carmel

Architecture
- Heritage designation: Category A listed building
- Designated: 22 February 1971
- Architect(s): Seymour and Kinross (restoration)
- Style: 15th-century Gothic

Administration
- Diocese: Edinburgh

The Priory Church of St Mary of Mount Carmel, commonly called the Priory Church or St Mary's Episcopal Church, is a congregation of the Scottish Episcopal Church located in South Queensferry, near Edinburgh, Scotland.

The church building was constructed in the mid 15th century for the Carmelite Order. It served as the parish church in the 16th and 17th centuries, but subsequently fell into disrepair. In 1890 it was restored and reopened by the Scottish Episcopal Church. It is now the only medieval Carmelite church still in use in the British Isles, and is a category A listed building.

== History ==
The Carmelite Friary at Queensferry was founded in 1330. The first known record dates from 1457, and is a grant of land from James Dundas of Dundas to the Carmelite order, for the purpose of building a monastery.

Following the Scottish Reformation of 1560, the Carmelite monastery returned to the ownership of the Dundas family, and the former Carmelite church was subsequently used as the parish church. In the 17th century a new parish church was constructed (now the Old Parish Church on The Vennel), and the congregation moved out of the Carmelite church in 1635. In 1633, the church became the burial place for the Dundas family.

The building was put to a variety of uses until the late 19th century, and during this time its condition deteriorated. The monastic buildings were demolished, as was the nave in 1875. Architects Henry Seymour and John Kinross completed a restoration scheme in 1889, and the following year James Montgomery, Dean of Edinburgh, reconsecrated the building for the Scottish Episcopal Church. Further restoration and repair works were carried out in 2000.

== The church building ==
The building comprises the choir, tower and south transept of the Carmelite church. The nave lay to the west of the tower until demolished in 1875. In 1937 a small porch was added to the west of the tower. The former choir is used as the present nave, and the south transept is used as the baptistery. The tower was originally of three storeys

Nothing remains of the other monastic buildings, thought to have been located to the north of the church, and no remains were recovered during archaeological digs in the 1970s.
