= Bishop of Edinburgh =

Office in the Episcopal Scottish Church

- Bishopric

Anglican
- Incumbent; Dagmar Winter

Location
- Ecclesiastical province: Scotland

Information
- First holder: William Forbes
- Established: 1633
- Diocese: Diocese of Edinburgh
- Cathedral: St Mary's Cathedral, Edinburgh

The Bishop of Edinburgh, or sometimes the Lord Bishop of Edinburgh, is the ordinary of the Scottish Episcopal Diocese of Edinburgh.

Prior to the Reformation, Edinburgh was part of the Diocese of St Andrews, under the Archbishop of St Andrews and throughout the mediaeval period the episcopal seat was St Andrew's Cathedral. The line of Bishops of Edinburgh began with the creation of the See of Edinburgh in 1633: the See was founded in 1633 by King Charles I. William Forbes was consecrated at St Giles' Cathedral as the first bishop on 23 January 1634 though he died later that year. The General Assembly of 1638 deposed David Lindsay and all the other bishops, so the next, George Wishart, was consecrated in 1662 after the Stuart Restoration.

In 1690, it was Alexander Rose (bishop 1687–1720) whose unwelcome reply to King William III (and II) led to the disestablishment of the Scottish Episcopalians as Jacobite sympathisers, and it was he who led his congregation from St Giles' to a former wool store as their meeting house, on the site now occupied by Old St Paul's Church. After the break with the Church of Scotland in 1689, Bishops of Edinburgh were ex officio metropolitan bishops until this rank was abolished by a concordat of 1731. Since then, the Episcopal Church has been led by a Primus of the Scottish Episcopal Church elected from among any of the Scottish dioceses.

After the repeal of the penal laws in 1792 and the reuniting of Episcopal and "Qualified" congregations, the diocese grew under the leadership of bishops Daniel Sandford, James Walker, Charles Terrot and Henry Cotterill. The high point of the 19th century was the consecration of St Mary's Cathedral in 1879.

The Bishop of Edinburgh is entitled to the style Lord Bishop, as a diocesan bishop in the Anglican Communion.

The Lord Bishop of Edinburgh is ex-officio the Gentleman Usher of the White Rod in the Estates of Parliament of Scotland.

The most recent bishop was John Armes. He became Bishop-elect of Edinburgh on 11 February 2012 and was consecrated and installed as bishop on 12 May 2012. He retired on 31 August 2025.

On 1 March 2026, Dr Dagmar Winter, previously Bishop of Huntingdon, in the Diocese of Ely was elected as the next Bishop of Edinburgh.

== Church of Scotland Protestant Bishops ==
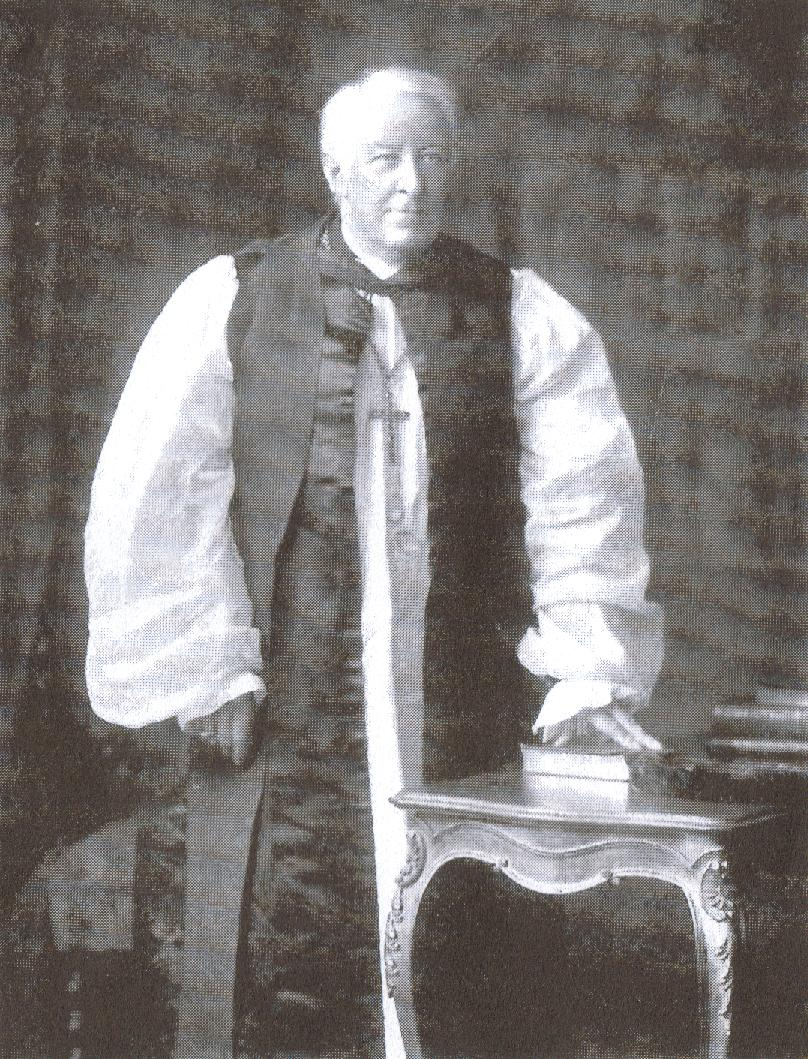
John Dowden, Irish historian of the Scottish church, and bishop of Edinburgh

Church of Scotland bishops:

- Jan–Apr 1634 William Forbes
- 1634–1638: David Lindsay
- 1638–1661: see abolished
- 1662–1671: George Wishart
- 1672–1679: Alexander Young
- 1679–1687: John Paterson
- 1687–1689: Alexander Rose (became a non-juring bishop)

== Scottish Episcopal Church bishops ==
see

- 1689–1720: Alexander Rose (also exercised Metropolitan authority 1704–1720)
- 1720–1727: John Fullarton (also Primus 1720–1727)
- May–Oct 1727: Arthur Millar (also Primus May–Oct 1727)
- 1727–1733: Andrew Lumsden (also Primus 1727–1731)
- 1733–1739: David Freebairn (also Primus 1731–1738)
- 1739–1776: See vacant: following disagreements over church polity and the failure of the Jacobite rising of 1745, there was an extended vacancy.
- 1776–1784: William Falconer (also Primus 1762–1782)
- 1784–1788: See vacant
- 1788–1805: William Abernethy Drummond
- 1806–1830: Daniel Sandford
- 1830–1841: James Walker (also Primus 1837–1841)
- 1841–1872: Charles Terrot (also Primus 1857–1862)
  - 1863–1869: Thomas Baker Morrell, bishop-coadjutor
- 1872–1886: Henry Cotterill
- 1886–1910: John Dowden
- 1910–1929: Somerset Walpole
- 1929–1939: Harry Reid
- 1939–1946: Logie Danson (also Primus 1943–1946)
- 1947–1961: Kenneth Warner
- 1961–1975: Kenneth Carey
- 1975–1985: Alastair Haggart (also Primus 1977–1985)
- 1986–2000: Richard Holloway (also Primus 1992–2000)
- 2001–2011: Brian Smith
- 2012–2025: John Armes
- 2026–present: Dagmar Winter

== Assistant bishops ==
Among those who served as assistant bishops of the diocese were:

- 1938–1939: Logie Danson, Provost of St Mary's Cathedral and former Bishop of Labuan and Sarawak; elected diocesan bishop, 1939
- 1968–1982: Neil Russell, priest of Rosslyn Chapel and former assistant bishop for Zanzibar Island (Zanzibar)

== See also ==
- Roman Catholic Archbishop of St Andrews and Edinburgh
- Bishops in the Church of Scotland

== Bibliography ==
- Bertie, David M. (2000). Scottish Episcopal Clergy, 1689-2000. Edinburgh: T & T Clark. ISBN 0-567-08746-8.
- Fryde, E. B.; Greenway, D. E.; Porter, S.; Roy, I., eds. (1986). Handbook of British Chronology (3rd, reprinted 2003 ed.). Cambridge: Cambridge University Press. ISBN 0-521-56350-X.
- Keith, Robert (1824). An Historical Catalogue of the Scottish Bishops: Down To The Year 1688. Edinburgh: Printed for Bell and Bradfute.
- Scott, Hew (1928). Fasti Ecclesae Scoticanae. Vol. 7 (New ed.). Edinburgh: Oliver and Boyd.
- Skinner, John (1818). Annals of Scottish Episcopacy. Aberbeen: A. Brown & Co.
