= Tim Morris (priest) =

Timothy David Morris was Dean of Edinburgh from 1992 to 2001.

Born in 1948 and educated at London University, he was ordained after a period of study at Trinity College, Bristol Deacon in 1975 and priest in 1976. He was the curate at St Thomas, Edinburgh then held incumbencies in Edinburgh, Troon and Galashiels. before his time as Dean.

== Notes ==
Anglican Communion titles
Preceded by Douglas Maclean Cameron	Dean of Edinburgh; 1992 – 2001	Succeeded by James Adlington Mein
