= Diocese of Edinburgh =

Anglican diocese of the Scottish Episcopal Church

Coordinates: 55.974°N 3.567°W

Diocese of Edinburgh Dioecesis Edimburgensis

Location
- Country: Scotland
- Territory: Edinburgh, Lothian, Borders, Falkirk
- Ecclesiastical province: Scotland

Statistics
- Congregations: 53

Information
- Denomination: Scottish Episcopal Church
- Cathedral: St Mary's Episcopal Cathedral

Current leadership
- Bishop: Dagmar Winter
- Dean: Frances Burberry

Map
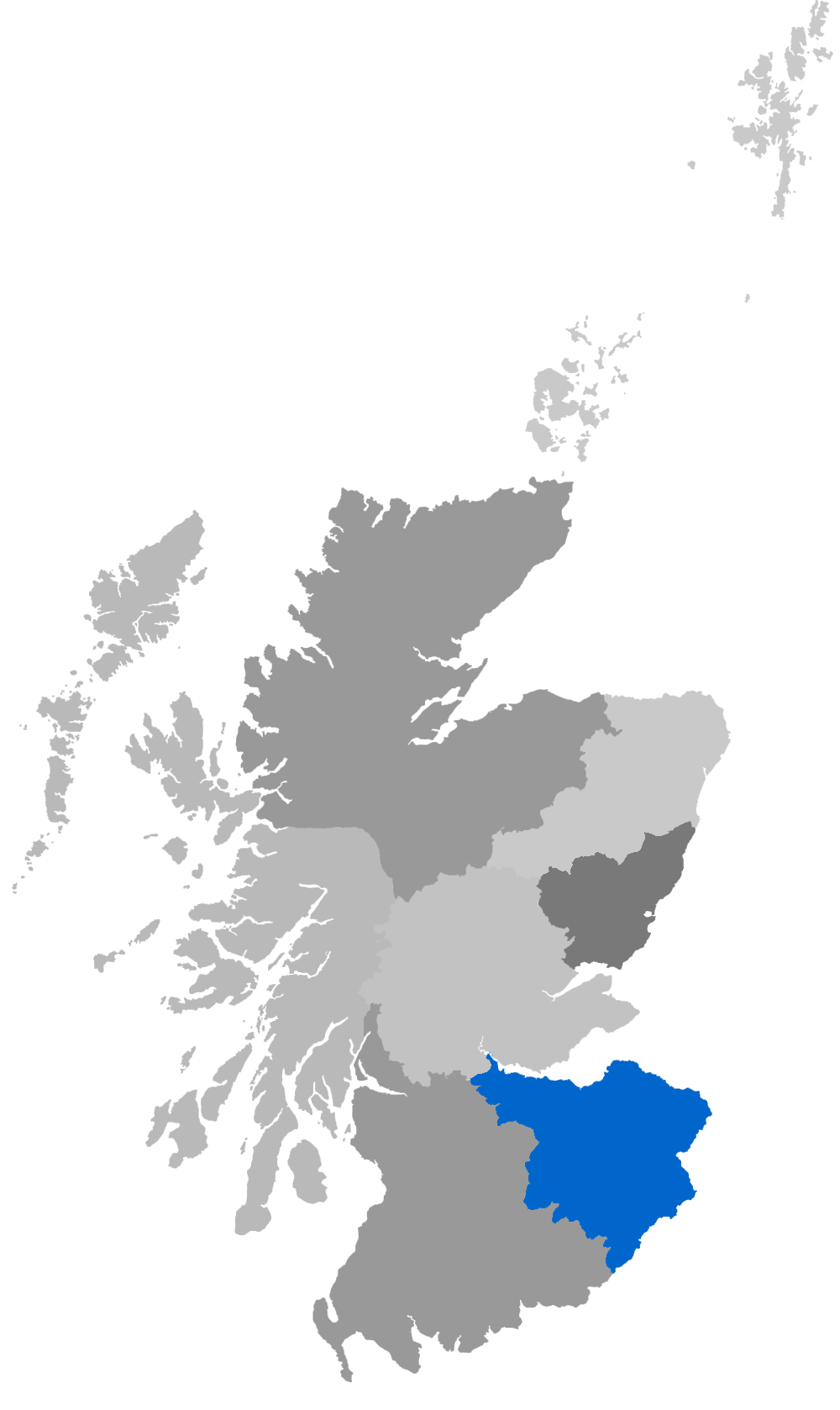
- Map showing Edinburgh Diocese within Scotland

Website
- edinburgh.anglican.org

The Diocese of Edinburgh is one of the seven dioceses of the Scottish Episcopal Church. It covers the City of Edinburgh, the Lothians, the Borders and Falkirk. The diocesan centre is St Mary's Cathedral, Edinburgh. The current Bishop of Edinburgh is Dagmar Winter.

== History ==
A number of important events took place in the city which put the Edinburgh diocese at the centre of the formation of the Scottish Episcopal Church. Unlike the other dioceses of the Episcopal Church which were inherited from the organisation of the Catholic Church, the Diocese of Edinburgh is a relatively recent creation, having been founded in 1633 by King Charles I, the year of his Scottish coronation. William Forbes was consecrated on 23 January 1634 in St. Giles' Cathedral as the first bishop of Edinburgh.

Forbes died only three months after his consecration and David Lindsay succeeded him as bishop of the nascent episcopal see. At this time, the effects of the Scottish Reformation were taking a new turn and Lindsay, along with all other bishops in Scotland, was deposed in 1638 and the heritage and jurisdiction of the church passed into the hands of the Presbyterian Church of Scotland. A period of great political and ecclesiastical turmoil ensued with the Bishops' Wars and the Wars of the Three Kingdoms engulfing Scotland and England. It was not until the Restoration of the monarchy that the Episcopacy was restored to the Scottish Church and George Wishart was consecrated as the new Bishop of Edinburgh in 1662.

Episcopal rule was short-lived. In 1689 Alexander Rose (bishop 1687-1720) found himself caught up in the Jacobite conflict following the Glorious Revolution. Scottish bishops were under pressure to declare their allegiance to William of Orange over the Stuart King James VII

During an audience with the new King William in 1690, Rose's ambiguous declaration arose royal displeasure:

Sir, I will serve you as far as law, reason, or conscience shall allow me.

— Alexander Rose, 1690, Quoted in Clarke, "Rose, Alexander (1645/6–1720)".

With Jacobite sympathies running throughout the Episcopal wing of the church, the Scottish Episcopalians were disestablished and Presbyterian polity was permanently established in the Church of Scotland. Rose departed from St Giles' Cathedral in 1689 and took with him a number of supporters from the congregation to begin a separate church. They took over a former wool store a short distance down the Royal Mile as a venue for their worship; today, Old St Paul's Church is located on this site, and claims to be the oldest Episcopal congregation in Scotland.

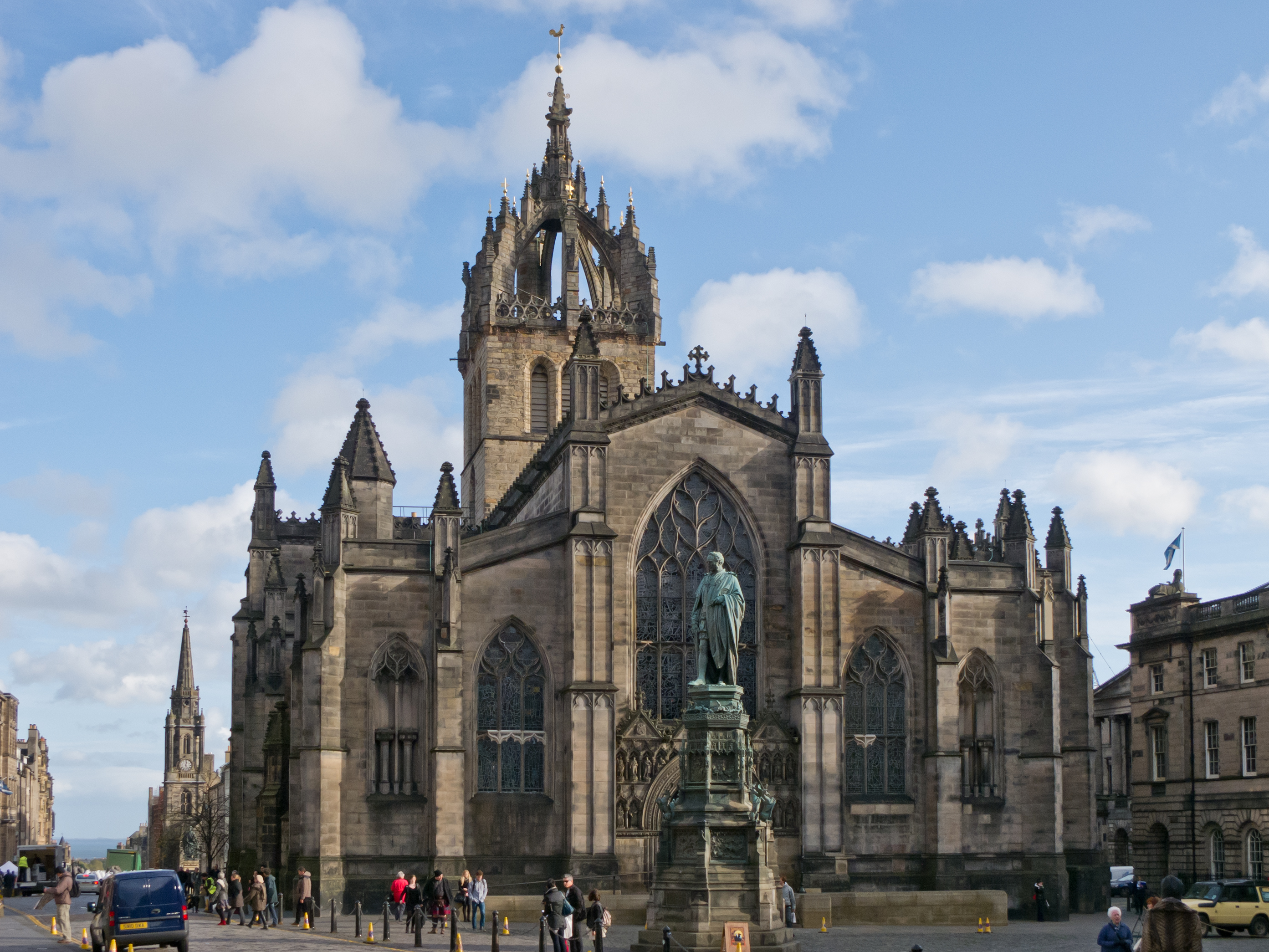
St. Giles, the cathedral from 1635–1638 and 1661–1689 (now Church of Scotland)

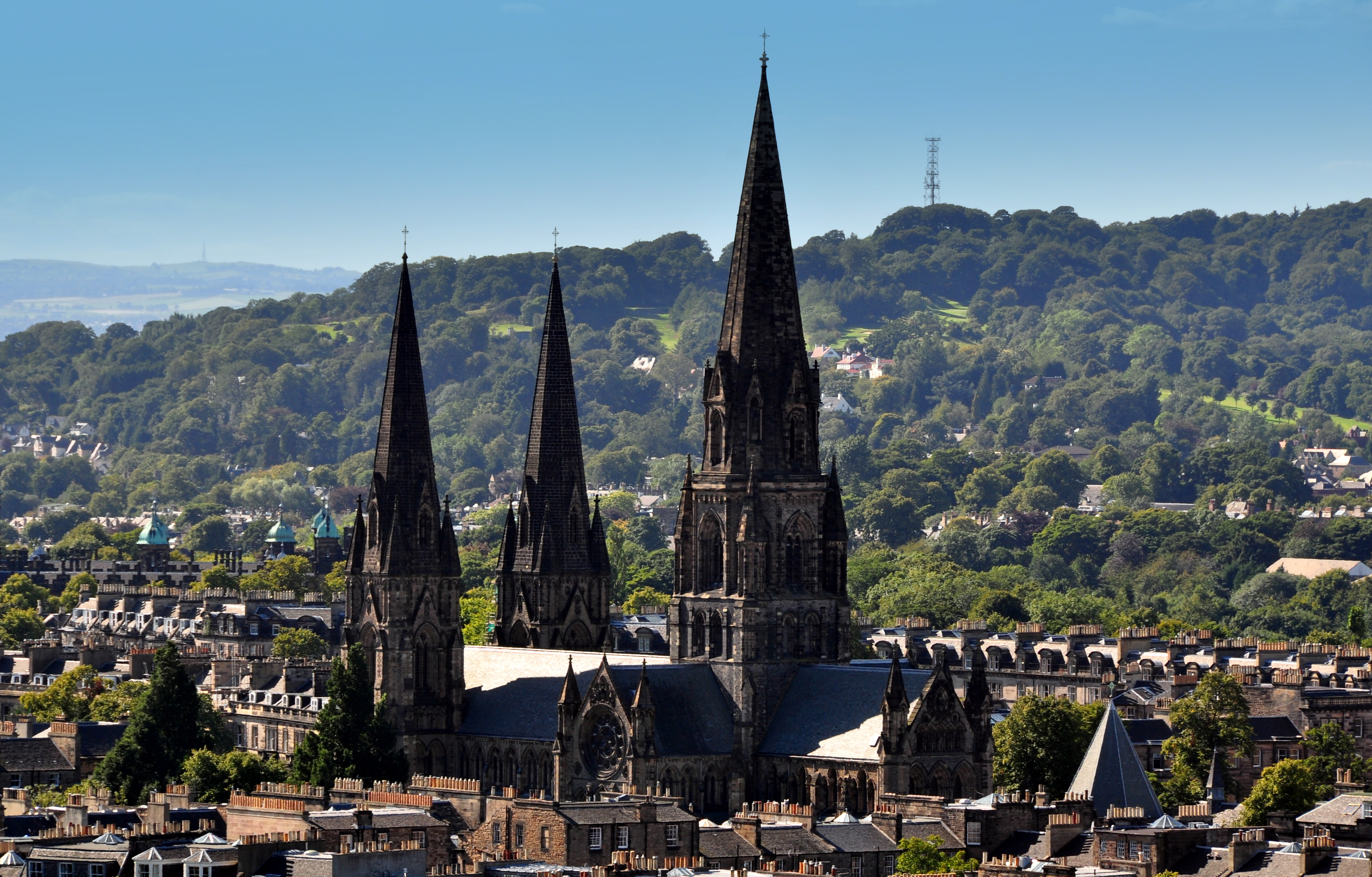
St. Mary's, the Episcopal cathedral from 1879

For many years, Edinburgh (like the other Episcopal dioceses in Scotland) had no cathedral church. Gradually, as Non-Jurors and Qualified congregations were reconciled and the penal laws were repealed (1792), the Episcopal Church moved back into the mainstream of Scottish religious life; secret Episcopalian meeting houses were replaced by churches, a number of which served as pro-cathedrals for Edinburgh. By the late nineteenth century, the Diocese of Edinburgh was in a position to build its own cathedral through donations from wealthy benefactors, and in 1874 the foundations were laid for St Mary's Cathedral on Palmerston Place in the West End. This new cathedral, completed in 1879, was designed in the Gothic Revival style by Sir George Gilbert Scott and its three massive spires reaching 90 metres (300 ft) and 60 metres (200 ft) can be seen on the western skyline from Princes Street.

The High Kirk of St Giles still stands today on the Royal Mile; while it is commonly referred to as "St Giles' Cathedral" this is an honorary title as, being a Presbyterian church, lacks a cathedra (the throne of a Bishop). Another St Mary's Cathedral also exists in Edinburgh, the Roman Catholic Cathedral which is situated on Picardy Place at the top of Leith Walk.

== Area and population ==
The diocese covers the historic counties of Linlithgowshire, Midlothian, Haddingtonshire, Berwickshire, Peeblesshire, Selkirkshire, Roxburghshire and the Falkirk area of Stirlingshire.

This total population of approximately 1,082,000 gives the diocese a ratio of one priest to every 21,200 inhabitants and one church to every 20,000 inhabitants.

== Notable people ==
=== Deans ===
The most senior appointed priest of the Diocese is the Dean of Edinburgh. The dean fulfils a role similar to that of an archdeacon in other provinces of the Anglican Communion. The head of the diocese's cathedral is titled the Provost.

- 1919–1929: Harry Reid
- 1929–1939: William Perry
- 1939–1954: Roderick Mackay
- 1954–1961: David Porter
- 1962–1967: George Martineau
- 1967–1976: Robert Clark
- 1976–1982: Ernest Brady
- 1982–1985: Malcolm Clark
- 1985–1986: Ernest Brady; second time in office
- 1986–1991: Brian Hardy
- 1991–1992: Douglas Cameron
- 1992–2001: Tim Morris
- 2001–2004: Jim Mein
- 2004–2010: Kevin Pearson
- 2010–2012: John Armes
- 2012–2017: Susan Macdonald
- 2017–present: Frances Burberry

== Churches ==
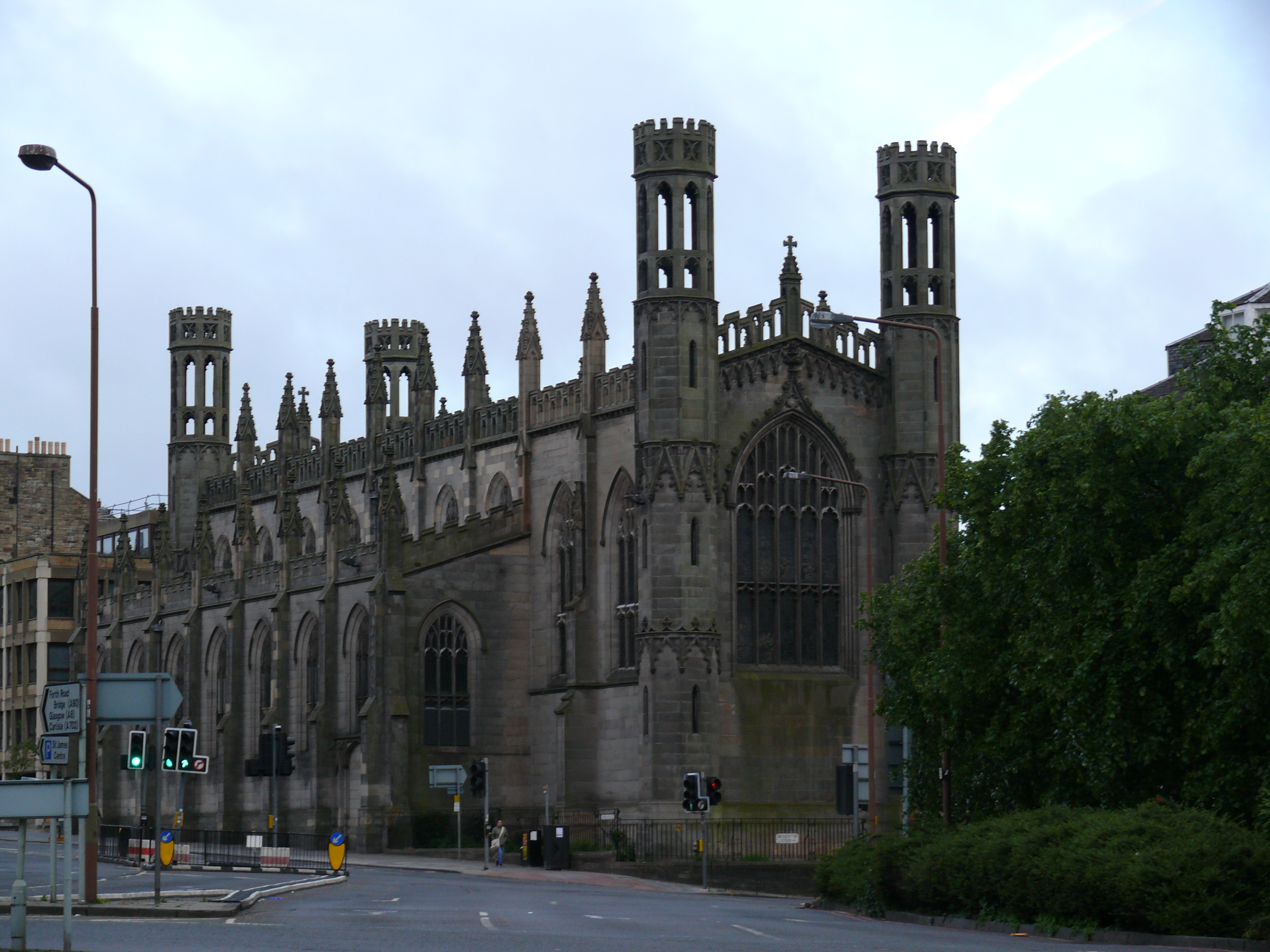
St Paul's and St George's Church, York Place (1818)

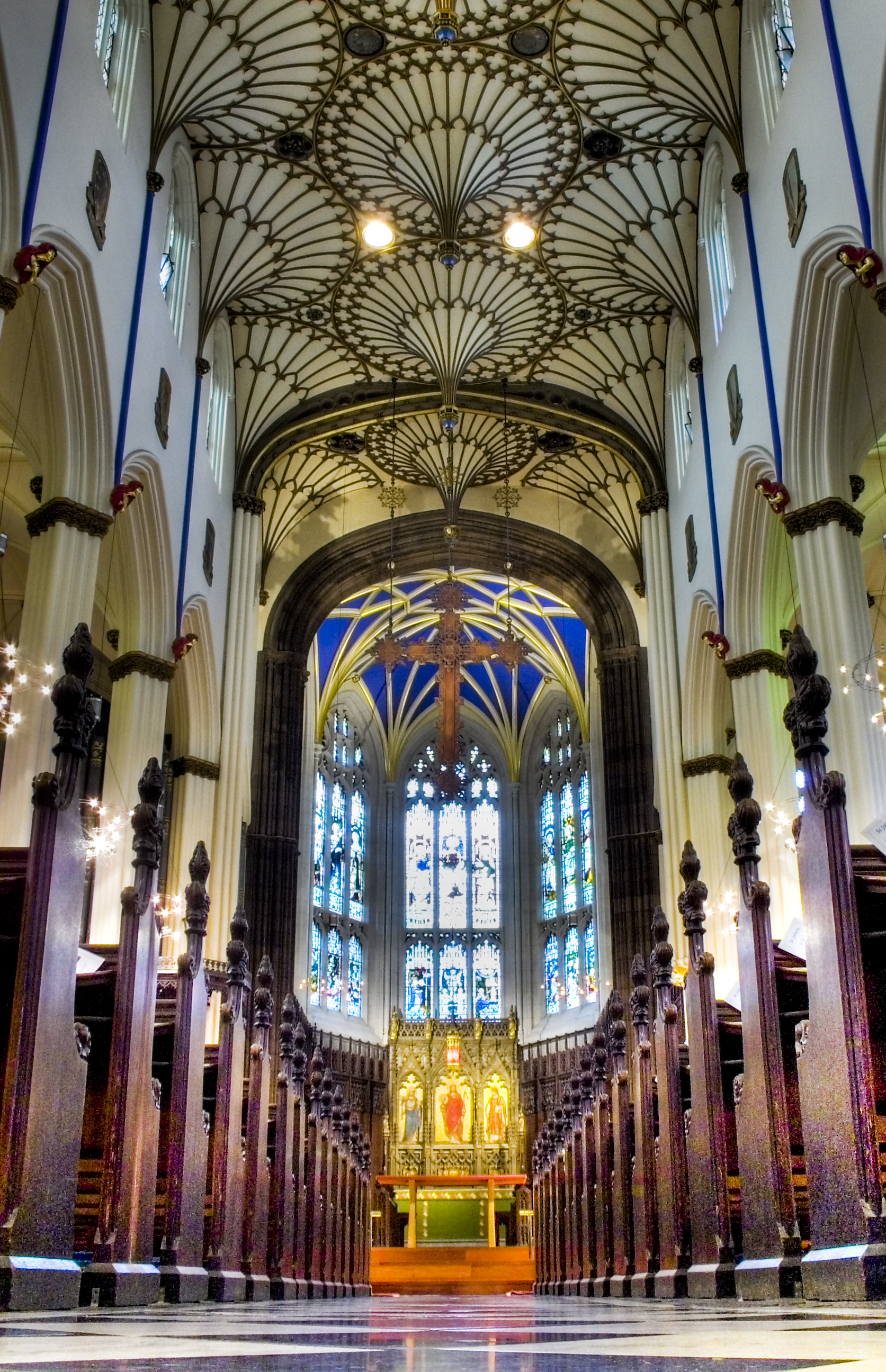
Church of St John the Evangelist, Princes Street (1818)

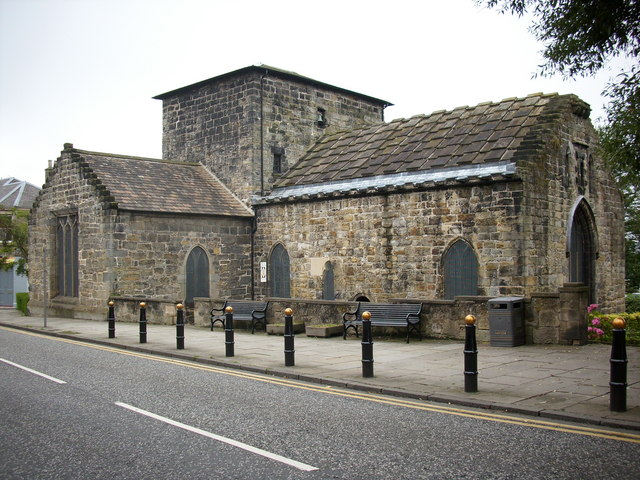
St. Mary's Priory Church, South Queensferry (15th century)

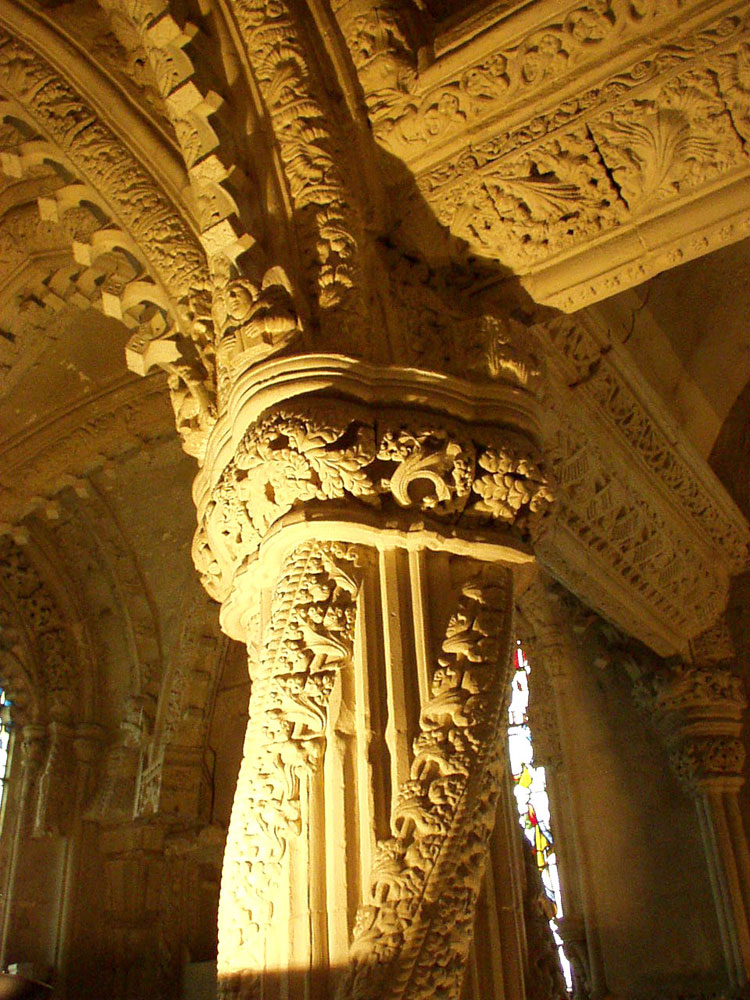
The ornate Apprentice Pillar of Rosslyn Chapel (15th century)

The Episcopal cathedral is St Mary's Cathedral, at the West End of the city. Notable Episcopal churches in the Edinburgh diocese include Rosslyn Chapel, popularised by Dan Brown's novel The Da Vinci Code; the Priory Church, South Queensferry, the only medieval Carmelite church still in use in the British Isles; and Old St Paul's, the oldest Episcopal congregation in Scotland.

The diocese currently has 50 stipendiary clergy and 53 churches. Last fully updated 19 September 2018.

Benefice	Name	Ref	Clergy	Ref
Falkirk (Christ Church)	Christ Church, Falkirk (1863)		Rector: Sarah Shaw	
Bo'ness (St Catharine)	St Catharine, Bo'ness (1864)		Rector: Willie Shaw	
Grangemouth (St Mary)	St Mary, Grangemouth (1901)		Rector: Willie Shaw	
Bathgate (St Columba)	St Columba, Bathgate (pre-1915)		Rector: Christine Barclay	
Linlithgow (St Peter)	St Peter's, Linlithgow (1928)		Rector: Christine Barclay	
Livingston Local Ecumenical Partnership	Livingston United Parish Church (1966)		Ministers: From other denoms	
Dalmahoy (St Mary)	St Mary, Dalmahoy (1850)		Rector: Christine Downey	
Balerno (St Mungo)	St Mungo, Balerno (1869)		Rector: Malcolm Round	
Edinburgh (Cathedral of St Mary)	St Mary's Cathedral, Edinburgh (c1689)		Provost/Rector: John Conway; Vice-Provost: John McLuckie; NSM: Paul Foster	
Edinburgh (Old St Paul)	Old St Paul's, Edinburgh (1689)		Rector: Ian Paton; Hon. Curate: Charles Davies-Cole; Hon. Curate: Colin Reed (see below)	
Edinburgh (St Margaret of Scotland)	St Margaret of Scotland, Edinburgh (1877)		Priest-in-Charge: Colin Reed	
Edinburgh (St Columba)	St Columba's-by-the-Castle (1846)		Rector: David Paton-Williams; Team Vicar: Bob Gould; Assoc. Priest (NSM): Alison Wagstaff	
Edinburgh (St John the Evangelist)	St John the Evangelist, Edinburgh (1792)		Rector: Markus Dünzkofer; Associate Rector: Rosie Addis; NSM: Clephane Hume; NSM: Eileen Thompson; NSM: Kenneth Boyd, Church of Scotland minister delegated from St Cuthbert's Edinburgh to St John's as part of a Local Ecumenical Partnership	
Edinburgh (St Philip and St James)	St James, Goldenacre (1888)		Rector: Jane MacLaren	
Edinburgh (St Paul and St George)	St Paul and St George, Edinburgh (pre-1816)		Rector: Dave Richards; Curate: Libby Talbot; Curate: Paul Sawrey	
Edinburgh (St Peter)	St Peter, Lutton Place (1807)		Rector: Vacant; NSM: Robert Halliday	
Edinburgh (St Cuthbert)	St Cuthbert, Colinton (1883)		Rector: Nicki McNelly	
Edinburgh (St Ninian)	St Ninian, Comely Bank (C19th)		Rector: Frances Burberry; Curate: Oliver Brewer-Lennon	
Edinburgh (St Martin of Tours)	St Martin of Tours, Gorgie & Dalry (1883)		Rector: Yousouf Gooljary; NSM: David Warnes	
Edinburgh (Holy Cross)	Holy Cross, Davidson's Mains (1898)		Rector: Douglas Kornahrens	
Edinburgh (St Fillan)	St Fillan, Buckstone (1894)		Rector: Ruth Innes	
Edinburgh (St James the Less)	St James the Less, Leith (1863)		Rector: Stephen Butler; NSM: Michael Northcott; NSM: Jane MacLaren; NSM: Jolyon Mitchell	
Edinburgh (St Barnabas)	St Barnabas, Edinburgh (1950)		Priest-in-Charge: David Dixon; NSM: Alice Anderson	
Edinburgh (Christ Church)	Christ Church, Morningside (1876)		Rector: Susan Macdonald; Curate: Jenny Wright; Curate: Jane Green	
Edinburgh (Good Shepherd)	Good Shepherd, Murrayfield (1899)		Rector: Dean Fostekew; Curate: Rosie Addis	
Edinburgh (St David of Scotland)	St David of Scotland, Edinburgh (1941)		Rector: Ruth Green	
Edinburgh (St Mark)	St Mark, Portobello (1826)		Rector: Sophia Marriage	
Edinburgh (St Salvador)	St Salvador, Edinburgh (1934)		Priest-in-Charge: Vacant; Curate: Mariusz Wojciechowski	
Edinburgh (St Vincent)	St Vincent's Chapel, Edinburgh (1857)		Priest-in-Charge: Allan Maclean; Curate: William Mounsey	
Edinburgh (St Michael and All Saints)	St Michael and All Saints, Edinburgh (1853)		Rector: Martin Robson; Curate: John Penman	
Edinburgh (Emmanuel)	Emmanuel, Clermiston (1988)		Rector/Priest-in-C: Terence Harkin; NSM (Queensf): Iain MacRobert	
South Queensferry (Priory Church St Mary of Mount Carmel)	St Mary of Mt Carmel, Queensferry (1890)		Rector/Priest-in-C: Terence Harkin; NSM (Queensf): Iain MacRobert	
Penicuik (St James the Less)	St James the Less, Penicuik (1882)		Rector: Vacant; NSM (Penicuik): Neville Suttle	
West Linton (St Mungo)	St Mungo, West Linton (1851)		Rector: Vacant; NSM (Penicuik): Neville Suttle	
Roslin (Collegiate Church of St Matthew)	Rosslyn Chapel (1861)		Priest-in-Charge: Joseph Roulston	
Lasswade (St Leonard)	St Leonard, Lasswade & Bonnyrigg (1890)		Rector: Peter Harris; Curate: Jacqui du Rocher; NSM: Michael Jones; NSM: Elizabeth Jones; NSM: Jennie Godfrey	
Dalkeith (St Mary)	St Mary, Dalkeith (1843)		Rector: Peter Harris; Curate: Jacqui du Rocher; NSM: Michael Jones; NSM: Elizabeth Jones; NSM: Jennie Godfrey	
Musselburgh (St Peter)	St Peter, Musselburgh (1865)		Rector: Andy Reid	
Haddington (Holy Trinity)	Holy Trinity, Haddington (pre-1770)		Rector: Vacant; NSM: John Wood	
North Berwick (St Baldred)	St Baldred, North Berwick (1861)		Rector: Simon Metzner	
Gullane (St Adrian)	St Adrian, Gullane (1901)		Rector: Simon Metzner	
Dunbar (St Anne)	St Anne, Dunbar (1874)		Rector: Diana Hall	
Peebles (St Peter)	St Peter, Peebles (1836)		Rector: Vacant; Asst Priest (NSM): Colin Chaplin; NSM: Charles Aitchison	
Innerleithen (St Andrew)	St Andrew, Innerleithen (1904)		Rector: Vacant; Asst Priest (NSM): Colin Chaplin; NSM: Charles Aitchison	
Galashiels (St Peter)	St Peter, Galashiels (1851)		Priest-in-Charge: Vacant; Hon. Curate (Selkirk): David Sceats	
Selkirk (St John the Evangelist)	St John, Selkirk (1867)		Priest-in-Charge: Vacant; Hon. Curate (Selkirk): David Sceats	
Hawick (St Cuthbert)	St Cuthbert, Hawick (1858)		Priest-in-Charge: Vacant; Hon. Curate (Selkirk): David Sceats	
Melrose (Holy Trinity)	Holy Trinity, Melrose (1849)		Rector: Philip Blackledge; Curate: Margaret Pedersen; NSM: Dennis Wood	
Jedburgh (St John the Evangelist)	St John the Evangelist, Jedburgh (1844)		Rector: Vacant	
Kelso (St Andrew)	St Andrew, Kelso (1868)		Rector: Bob King	
Coldstream (St Mary and All Souls)	St Mary & All Souls, Coldstream (1872)		Rector: Jeffry Smith	
Duns (Christ Church)	Christ Church, Duns (1854)		Priest-in-Charge: Vacant; Curate: Grace Redpath	
Eyemouth (St Ebba)	St Ebba, Eyemouth (c1689)		Hon. Priest-in-Charge: Vacant	

=== Former congregation ===
Benefice	Church	Link	Note	Refs
Edinburgh (St Thomas) Private Chapel	St Thomas, Corstorphine (1844)		Left the SEC in 2018.	

=== Closed churches in the diocese ===
Church	Founded	Closed	Ref
St Michael, Edinburgh		1960s	
St Aiden, Niddrie Mains			
St Andrew, Prestonpans	c. 1910	2015 or later	
St Andrew, Edinburgh	1855		
St Andrew, Niddrie	c. 1897		
St Hilda, Edinburgh		2006	
St Luke, Wester Hailes		2003	

== Twinning ==
The Diocese of Edinburgh is twinned with the dioceses of two other churches:

- Anglican Diocese of Dunedin (Anglican Church in Aotearoa, New Zealand and Polynesia)
- Diocese of Connor (Church of Ireland)
