= Warman =

Warman may refer to:

Places

- Warman, Minnesota, United States, an unincorporated community
- Warman, Saskatchewan, Canada, a city
- Warman (provincial electoral district)

People with the surname

- Alister Warman (1946–2020), British curator and art school principal
- Arturo Warman (1937–2003), Mexican anthropologist
- Bob Warman (born 1946), British television presenter
- Clive Wilson Warman (1892–1919), American World War I flying ace
- Francis Warman, Archdeacon of Aston from 1965 to 1977
- Guy Warman (1872–1953), Anglican bishop
- Johnny Warman (born 1951), English rock and roll singer and songwriter
- Matt Warman, British Conservative Party politician, MP for Boston and Skegness since May 2015
- Richard Warman (born 1968), Canadian human rights lawyer

== See also ==
- Wahrmann
- Janne "Warman" Wirman (born 1979), Finnish keyboard player
