= Wahrmann =

Wahrmann is a surname. Notable people with the surname include:

- Israel ben Solomon Wahrmann (Hungarian: Wahrmann Israel; ? – 1824), a Hungarian rabbi and Talmudist
  - Judah Wahrmann (1791–1868), a rabbi, son of Israel Wahrmann
  - Moritz Wahrmann (1832–1892), a Hungarian politician, grandson of Israel

== Wahrman ==
- Abraham David ben Asher-Anshel Wahrman (Buczacz) (1770, Nadworna - 1840, Buczacz)

== See also ==
- Warman (disambiguation)
