= Wolfner =

Wolfner is a German surname. Notable people the name include:

- Jozsef Wolfner (1856–1932), Hungarian publisher
- Mariana Wolfner, American molecular biologist and geneticist
- Theodore Wolfner (1864–1929), Hungarian politician
- Violet Bidwill Wolfner (1900–1962), American businesswoman
