= St Aidan's College, Birkenhead =

Former theological college in Wirral, England

- Theological college
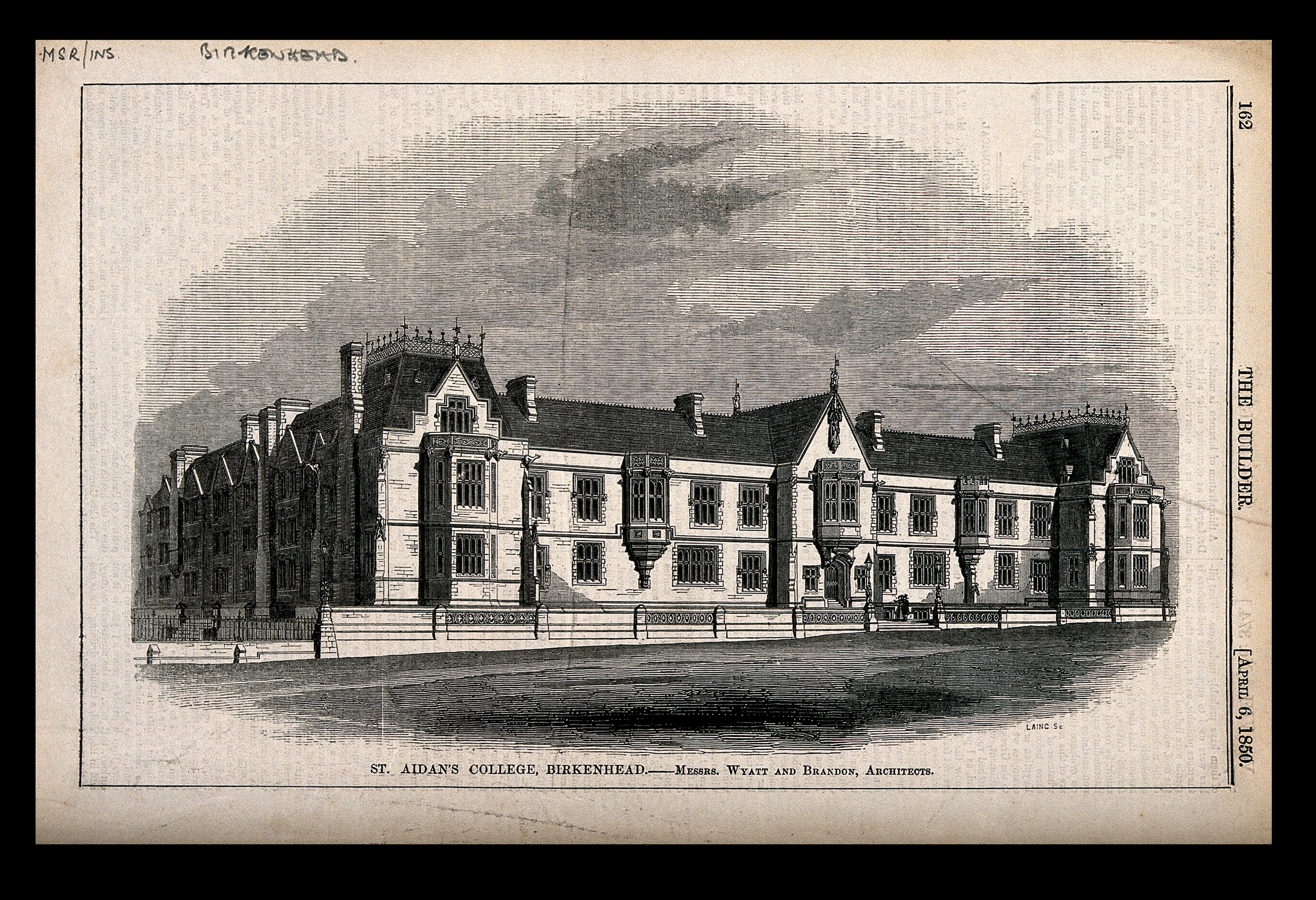
- 1850 wood engraving of the college buildings
- Location: Birkenhead, Cheshire, England
- Coordinates: 53.387°N 3.054°W
- Founder: Joseph Baylee
- Established: 1847 (formal inauguration 1856)
- Closed: 1969
- Status: Closed and demolished

Map
- Location within Merseyside

St Aidan’s College was a Church of England theological college in Birkenhead, Cheshire, England, open from 1847 to 1970.

== History ==
The college was founded in 1846 by Revd Dr Joseph Baylee, vicar of Birkenhead, with the approval of John Bird Sumner, Bishop of Chester. Initially a Parochial Assistance Association, it had taken on the name of a college by 1847.

From 1847 it was housed in five rented houses in Cambridge Terrace on Slatey Road, Prenton.

In 1856, it was formally inaugurated as a theological college with 63 students. Its purpose was to train Anglican clergy to serve in the Church of England, in particular in the rapidly expanding cities and towns of Merseyside. New buildings at Shrewsbury Road, Birkenhead, were designed by Henry Cole and inaugurated in November 1856.

The college closed in 1868, with the departure of its founder Dr Baylee. It re-opened in 1869 under a new council, who appointed as principal William Saumarez Smith, who, like Baylee, had strong evangelical credentials.

From 1876 the college was associated with Durham University, and its students were allowed to take the university's Licence in Theology.

A new chapel opened in 1882.

In 1891, Edwin Elmer Harding, vice-principal of Lichfield Theological College, was appointed principal. Unlike previous principals, he was not of an evangelical persuasion, and brought with him other staff from high-church foundations such as Lichfield and Keble College, Oxford. The practices of the newly-appointed staff caused increasing concern from the council, and in 1900 Harding returned to Lichfield as principal, and was replaced with evangelical Arthur Tait, who appointed Guy Warman as his vice-principal as his vice-principal. Warman succeeded Tait as principal in 1907, before going on to become Bishop of Truro, Chelmsford and Manchester.

In 1904, the college became affiliated to the newly-founded University of Liverpool, while its connection to Durham University was strengthened with the founding of St John's Hall in 1910.

A new dining hall was added to the college in 1912.

In the late 1960s, the college suffered from a decline in numbers of students. Various plans were suggested to allow the college to merge with another college, including the Northern Congregational College in Manchester - perhaps the reason why St Aidan's in 1967 gained recognition from the University of Manchester.

However, none of these plans came to fruition, and the college closed in summer 1969. Its buildings were auctioned, and demolished to allow the erection of a housing estate.

The name has been continued at St Mellitus North West; and its archives are located at the University of Liverpool.

== Notable staff ==
- Ronald Williams, tutor: later Principal of St John's College, Durham and Bishop of Leicester

=== Principals ===
- 1856–1868 Joseph Baylee
- 1869–1890 William Saumarez Smith
- 1890- Rev J T Kingsmill BD
- 1890–1900 Edwin Elmer Harding
- 1900–1907 Arthur Tait
- 1907–1916 Guy Warman
- 1922 Rev R. T. Howard
- 1959–1963 Michael Murray Hennell
- 1964- Canon Arthur G Widdess

== Alumni ==
Notable alumni include:

- Robert Atherton, poet
- John Foster, Dean of St John's Cathedral, Hong Kong
- Raphael Morgan, Eastern Orthodox Priest-Apostolic to America
- Stephen Moulsdale, first principal of St Chad's College, Durham
- Ishaq Musaad, Bishop of Egypt
- Herbert Parry, Archdeacon of Lindsey
- Snow Pendleton, priest in Uruguay and Italy
- Fred Pickering, Archdeacon of Hampstead
- Francis Pocock, the founder of Monkton Combe School
- Arthur Herbert Procter, recipient of the Victoria Cross
- Leonard Sharland, missionary to the Dinka people
- John Steele, cricketer and Chaplain to the Forces
- Percy Stevens, missionary and Bishop of Kwangsi-Hunan
