= Weymouth College (public school) =

Defunct public school in Dorset, England

- Weymouth, Dorset; England

Information
- Established: 1863
- Closed: 1940
- Gender: Boys

Weymouth College was a public school in Weymouth, Dorset, England, from 1863 to 1940. It closed during the Second World War because of the risks from its proximity to naval bases at Weymouth and Portsmouth, and the boys and some staff moved to Wellingborough School in Northamptonshire. A new house was formed at Wellingborough to accommodate the 33 pupils who moved, and Weymouth House still exists; since 1989 it has been the girls' house of the school.

Weymouth College aimed "to provide for the sons of gentlemen a classical, mathematical and general education of the highest class".

The building was designed by George Rackstraw Crickmay in 1864. Pevsner described the building as "The High Victorian style in a very debased form", and the chapel, 1894-96 as "really no better". In 1972 the building was in use as a College of Education. It is now a residential conversion. Some of the chapel furnishings are in St Aldhelm's Church, Radipole, Weymouth.

== Former pupils ==
Notable former pupils include:

- Henry Sturmey (1857–1930), co-inventor of Sturmey-Archer bicycle hub
- J. Meade Falkner (1858–1932), author of Moonfleet
- James Sherren (1872—1945), surgeon
- C. F. G. Masterman (1873–1927), Liberal politician and propagandist
- John Hindley, 1st Viscount Hyndley (1883–1963, business man
- Robert Wilmot Howard (1887–1960), clergyman and academic
- Stuart Hibberd (1893–1983), BBC Radio presenter
- George Stainforth (1899–1942), flying speed record breaker
- Percy James Brazier (1903–1989), bishop
- Louis Leakey (1903–1972), archaeologist and naturalist
- Francis Warman (1904–1991), Archdeacon of Aston
- Hugh Gough (1905–1997), Archbishop of Sydney
- C. F. D. Moule (1908–2007), theologian
- Admiral Sir Ronald Brockman (1909–1999), Royal Navy officer
- John Phillips (1910–1985), Bishop of Portsmouth
- Barney McCall (1913–1991), soldier and cricketer
- Robert Dove Leakey (1914–2013), inventor
- Andrew Wood Wilkinson (1914–1995), paediatrician
- Major-General Rea Leakey (1915–1999), soldier
- John Paul (1916–2004), colonial administrator
- Sir John Waller, 7th Baronet (1917–1995), author
- Admiral Nigel Malim (1919–2006), Royal Navy officer
- Major Hugh Austin Woollatt MC (1916 - 1944) World War 2 POW Camp Escapee with Airey Neave
