= Bishop Greer =

Bishop Greer can refer to the following:

- David Hummell Greer (1844–1919), American Protestant Episcopal bishop
- William Derrick Lindsay Greer (1902–1972), Anglican Bishop
