= István Farkas =

István Farkas may refer to:

- István Farkas (footballer) (born 1984), Hungarian footballer
- István Farkas (painter) (1887–1944), Hungarian painter and publisher
- István Farkas de Boldogfa (1875–1921), Hungarian nobleman and jurist
