= Maxwell Dunlop =

Maxwell Dunlop may refer to:

- Maxwell Dunlop (priest)
- Maxwell Dunlop (politician)
