= István Farkas (painter) =

Hungarian painter (1887–1944)

István Farkas (October 20, 1887 – July 1944) was a Hungarian painter, publisher and victim of the Holocaust.

== Life ==
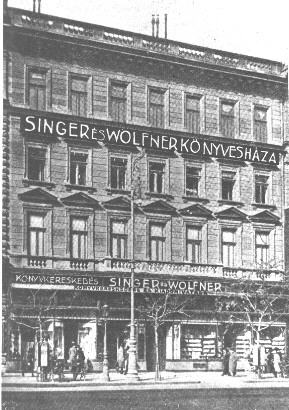
Singer és Wolfner publishing house, Andrássy street 16, Budapest (1912)

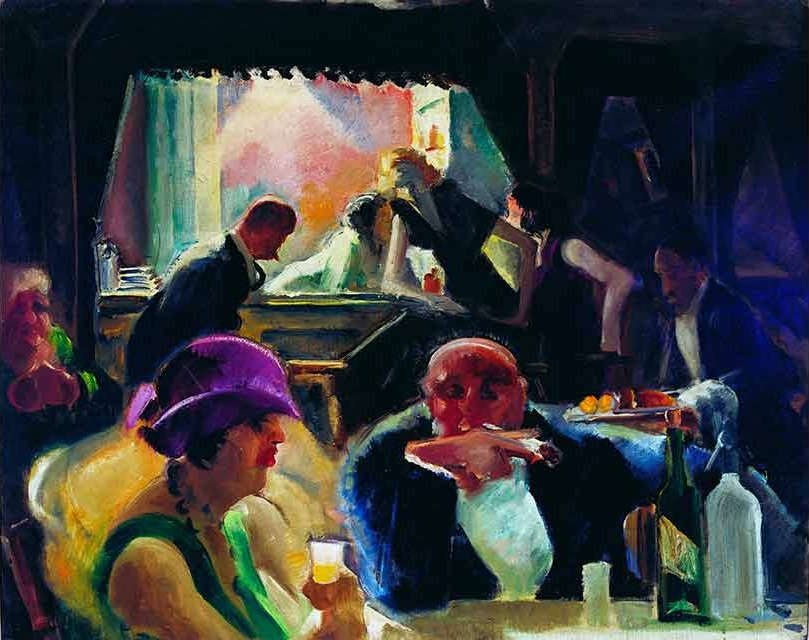
Coffeehouse Scene, 1922

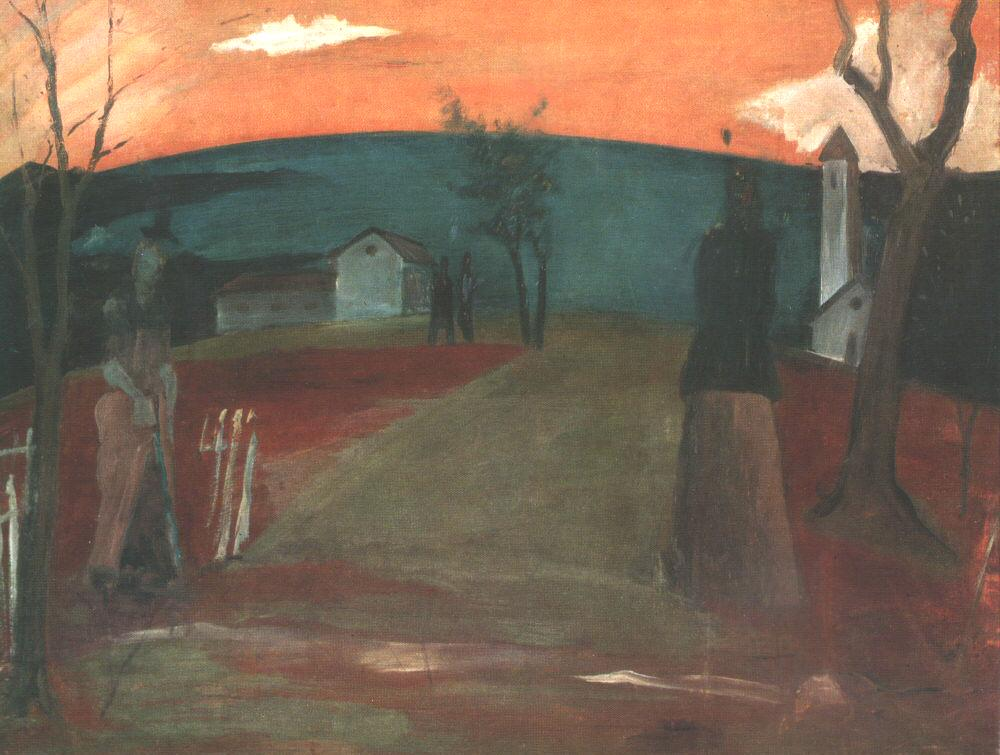
Landscape at Nightfall (Evening), 1931

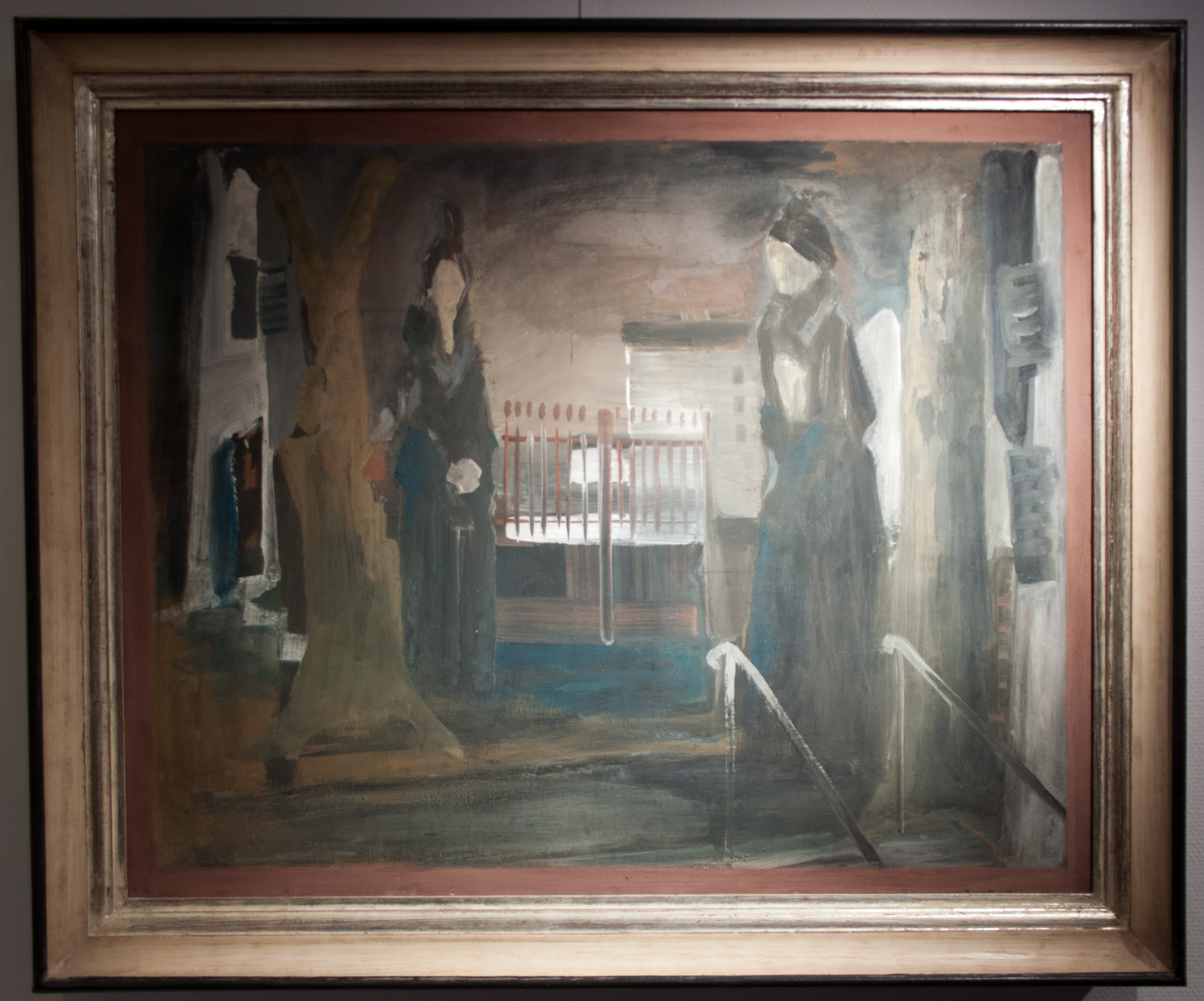
Black women, 1931

Farkas was born in Budapest. His father Jozsef Wolfner (1856–1932), a prominent art collector, was the founder of the book publishing house Singer and Wolfner. István’s mother, Anna Goldberger, died when he was four years old. As an adult István changed his family name from Wolfner (the German word for wolf) to Farkas (the Hungarian word for wolf).

The painter László Mednyánszky was Farkas’ first art teacher in Budapest. After receiving an education from the painters of the Nagybánya artists' colony he moved to Paris in 1912, entered the painter's circle of the Cubists of the Académie de La Palette and became friends with André Salmon who later wrote a monograph about him. In 1914 he joined the Austro-Hungarian army as a lieutenant. He was captured and held as a prisoner of war in Italy.

In 1923, he met Ida Kohner (1895–1944), daughter of Baron Adolf Kohner, the president of the Federation of Jewish Communities in Hungary in the studio of Adolf Fényes. After marrying in 1925, they had three children together. Farkas had his first solo exhibition of 117 pictures in the Ernst Museum in 1924. In November 1925 Farkas moved again to Paris, where he became part of the art scene at the Café de la Rotonde in the Montparnasse quarter. He became an established artist while in Paris, having many solo exhibitions, and one of the prominent Eastern European painters in the École de Paris.

As the sole heir of his father’s company, Farkas was forced to take over the family publishing house in Budapest after József Wolfner’s death in 1932. Under Farkas’ management the formerly conservative publishing house began publishing more progressive and modernist works. Despite his additional commitment as chief executive of the Új Idök KftHe, he kept his studio in Paris and continued to paint there. In 1932 and 1936 he had two large exhibitions at the Ernst Museum.

In 1939, the Horthy regime increased the severity of existing anti-Semitic legislation which had been implemented in 1919. Farkas, a Jew, expected that he would receive the protected status of a decorated war veteran and officer and for a short time he did. In 1943, he was able to organize an exhibition in the Tamás gallery, the catalog of which contained a foreword by Ernő Kállai.

After 1943 the persecution of Jews by the Hungarian authorities increased dramatically. Many of his friends and colleagues, including his French co-editor François Gachot, with whom he published books about József Rippl-Rónai, Tivadar Csontváry Kosztka, and Béni Ferenczy pleaded with him to leave Hungary immediately.

After the German occupation of Hungary in March 1944, the Nazis, in conjunction with the Hungarian authorities, started the active persecution of the Hungarian Jewish community, including the establishment of Jewish ghettos and the deportation of Jews to Auschwitz. The persecution began in the countryside and Farkas, living in Budapest, had a final opportunity to escape. Once again his friends, including the sculptor Pál Pátzay urged him to flee. But Farkas, still believing he would be protected from the Germans by the Hungarian authorities, remained.

On April 15, 1944 he was arrested in Budapest along with a group of 45 Jewish journalists and publicists, among them editors of the Pester Lloyd. After being held for several weeks in the Kistarcsa deportation camp, Farkas was deported to Auschwitz-Birkenau where he was gassed upon his arrival. His wife, Ida Kohner, was murdered by a band of Hungarian fascists in Budapest and her body was thrown in the Danube river. Farkas expressed his resignation in a letter smuggled out of the Auschwitz-bound train during a stopover at Kecskemét:

"When human dignity is so humiliated, it is not worth living anymore."

After the war the Russian occupation authorities confiscated his personal property, including his apartment in the Aradi utca and his mansion in Szigliget and nationalized his publishing house.

Beginning in the mid-1980s Farkas' work was gradually rediscovered by the art community outside Hungary. Since then, he has been the subject of many exhibitions including solo shows in Rome, New York City and Amsterdam. In 1997 Farkas’ portrait of Dezső Szomory was featured on the cover of the first edition of Nobel Prize winner Imre Kertész’ novel Valaki más. He was also the subject of a book Pranzo di Famiglia written by his granddaughter Alessandra Farkas, published by Sperling&Kupfer in 2006.

== Gallery ==
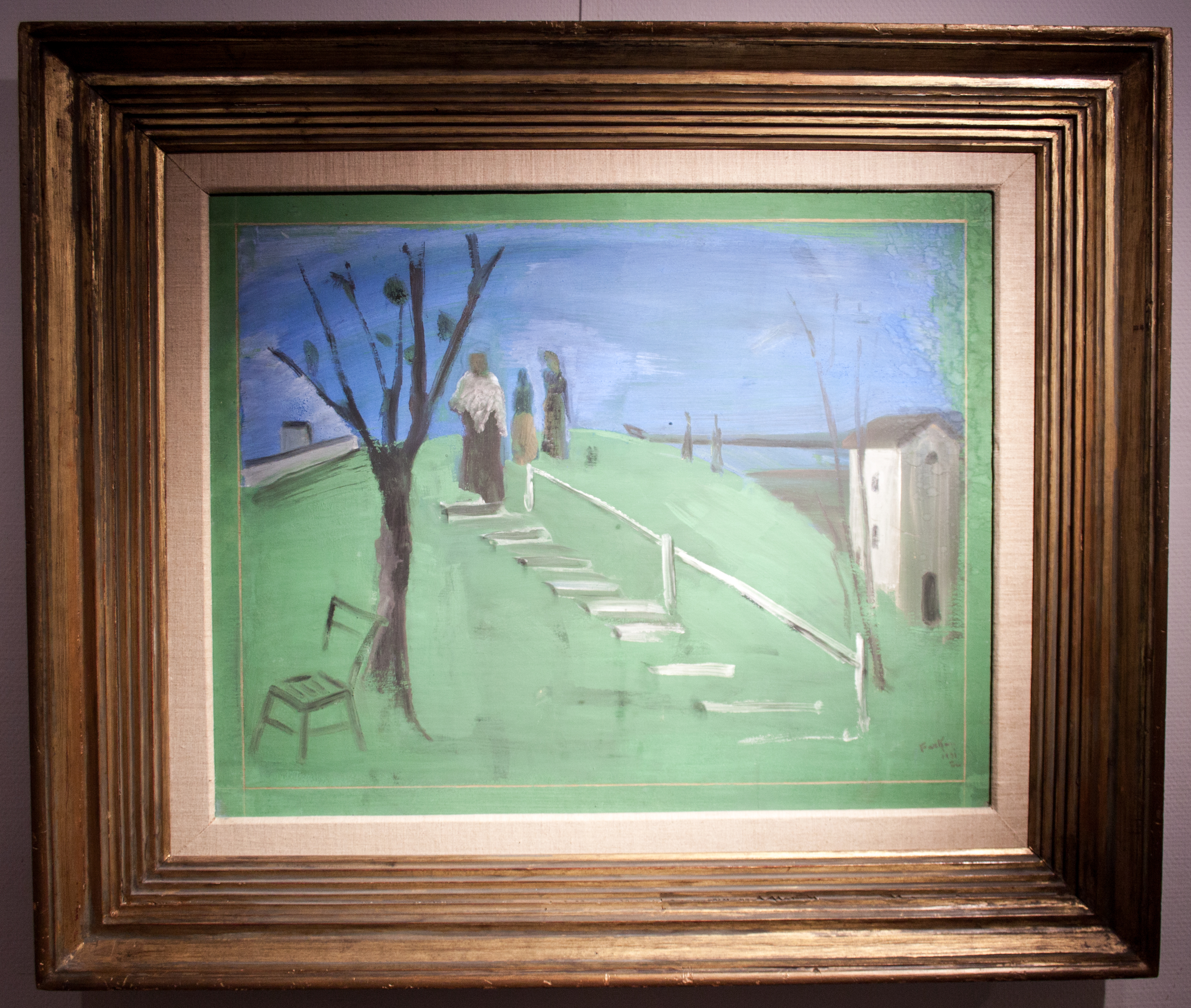
On the hillside, 1931

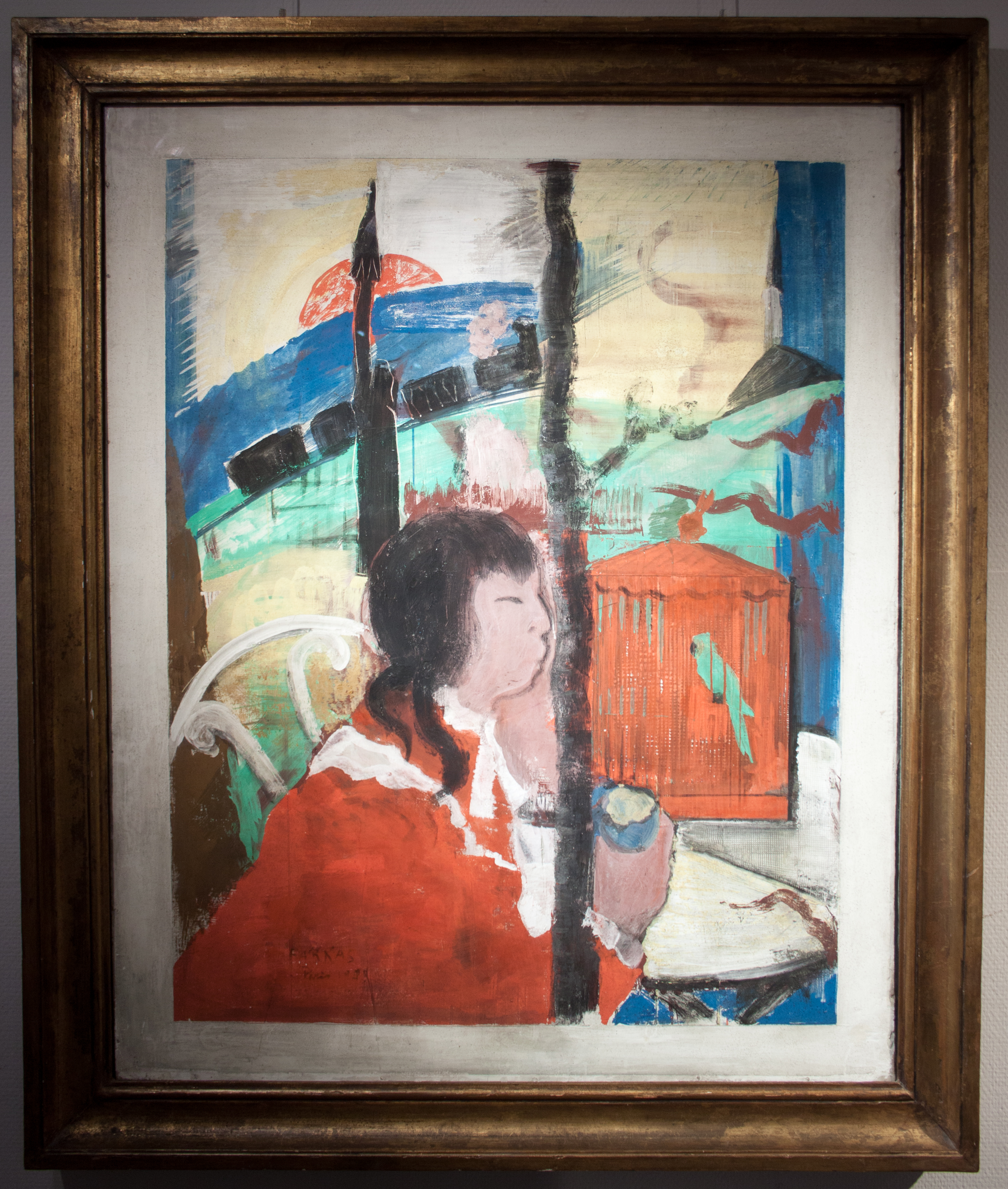
Red cage, 1928

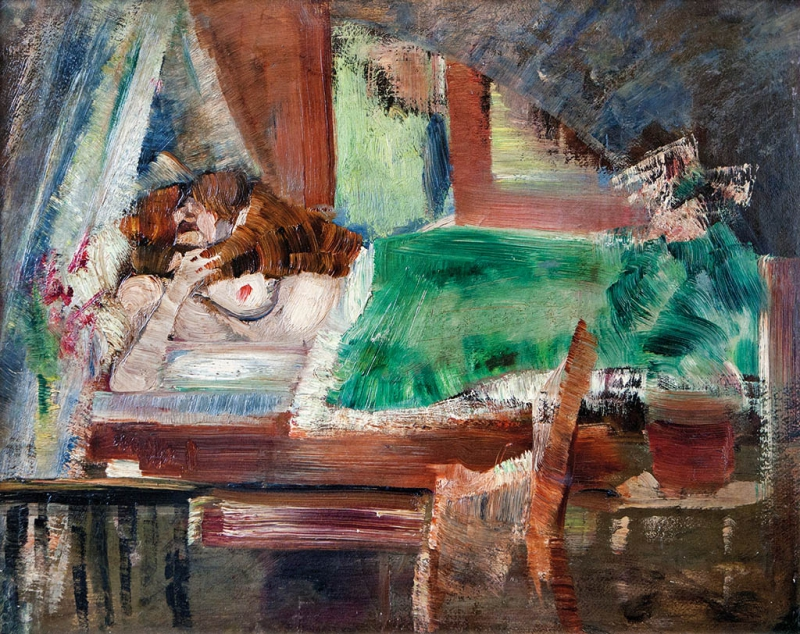
Mother playing with her child

== Literature ==
- György Konrád: Ebrei. Il popolo universale, Gaspari Editore Udine, ISBN 978-8875412791.
- Tamás Kieselbach [Hrsg.]: Die Moderne in der ungarischen Malerei, Bd. 2 1919–1964, Berlin: Nicolai, 2008 ISBN 978-3-89479-320-3.
- Gabriella Kernács: István Farkas (1887–1944): Der Maler des Narren von Syracuse, S. 42f
- Katalin S. Nagy: Farkas István. Budapest, 1994.
- Steven A. Mansbach u.a. [Hrsg.], Santa Barbara Museum of Art: Standing in the tempest.
- Painters of the Hungarian Avant-garde 1908–1930, Cambridge, Mass. [u.a.]: MIT Press, 1991 ISBN 0-262-13274-5
- André Salmon: Étienne Farkas: essai critique, Edition des Quatre-chemins, Paris 1935
- Alessandra Farkas: Pranzo di Famiglia, Sperling&Kupfer Editori, 2006 ISBN 882004059X
- Katalin S. Nagy, Imre Kertész: The Farkas Villa, Beiträge im Ausstellungskatalog des Historischen Museums Budapest, 2005
- István Farkas Memorial Room, Szigliget Ausstellung 2004 in Szigliget
