= Guy Warman =

British Anglican bishop (1872–1953)

- Bishop of Manchester
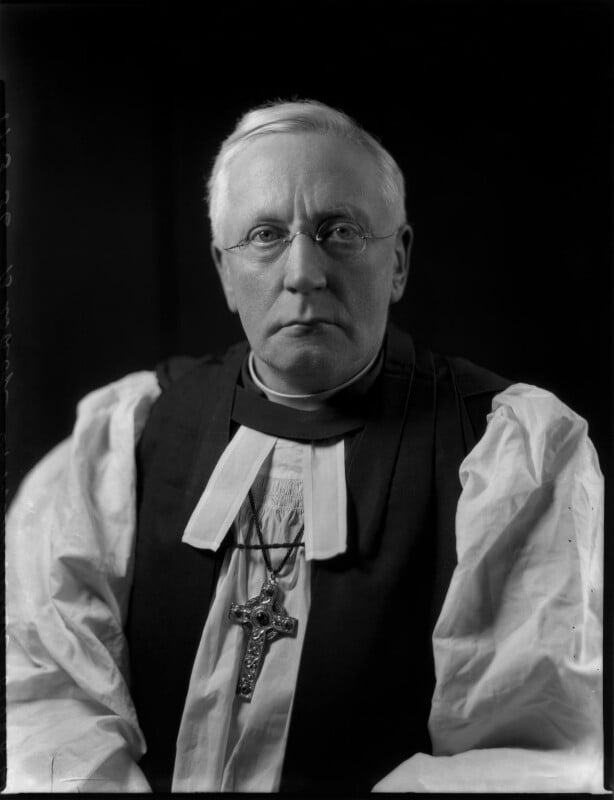
- Warman in 1936
- Church: Church of England
- Province: York
- Diocese: Manchester
- In office: 1929–1947
- Predecessor: William Temple
- Successor: William Greer
- Previous posts: Principal of St Aidan's College, Birkenhead (1907–1916); Bishop of Truro (1919–1923); Bishop of Chelmsford (1923–1929)

Orders
- Ordination: 1896
- Consecration: 1919

Personal details
- Born: Frederic Sumpter Guy Warman; 5 November 1872
- Died: 12 February 1953 (aged 80)
- Denomination: Anglican
- Spouse: Gertrude Earle
- Children: 2 sons
- Education: Merchant Taylors' School, Northwood
- Alma mater: Pembroke College, Oxford

Frederic Sumpter Guy Warman (5 November 1872 – 12 February 1953) was an Anglican bishop who held three separate episcopal appointments between 1919 and 1947.

He was educated at Merchant Taylors' and Pembroke College, Oxford and ordained priest in 1896. After curacies at Leyton (1895–99) and Hastings (1899–1901), he was Vice Principal of St Aidan's College, Birkenhead. He was Vicar of Birkenhead from 1902 to 1907; Principal of St Aidan's College, Birkenhead from 1907 to 1916 and Vicar of Bradford from 1916 to 1919. He was elevated to the episcopate in 1919. After four years in Cornwall as Bishop of Truro he was translated to Chelmsford in 1923 and six years later to Manchester. His translation to Manchester was effected by the confirmation of his election, on 21 January 1929 at York Minster.

From 1910 to 1914 he was editor of The Churchman jointly with Dawson Dawson-Walker, professor of Biblical Exegesis at Durham University.

He retired in 1947 and died six years later. He had married Gertrude, the daughter of surveyor Norwood Earle, and had two sons. His son, Francis Frederic Guy, was later Archdeacon of Aston.

Academic offices
Preceded by Arthur Tait	Principal of St Aidan's College, Birkenhead; 1907–1916	Succeeded by Richard Thomas Howard
Church of England titles
Preceded by Winfrid Burrows	Bishop of Truro; 1919–1923	Succeeded by Walter Frere
Preceded by John Watts Ditchfield	Bishop of Chelmsford; 1923–1929	Succeeded by Henry Wilson
Preceded by William Temple	Bishop of Manchester; 1929–1947	Succeeded by William Greer
