= John Cooper (archdeacon of Aston) =

John Leslie Cooper (born 16 December 1933) is a British retired Anglican priest. He was a senior clergyman in the Anglican Diocese of Birmingham in the last quarter of the 20th century, serving as Archdeacon of Aston from 1982 to 1990.

Cooper was educated at Tiffin School and Chichester Theological College. After National Service in the Royal Artillery he was a management trainee with GEC. Aftyer ordination he was Assistant Curate at All Saints, Kings Heath from 1962 to 1965. He was then a Prison Chaplain from 1965 until 1972. He was Priest in charge of St Paul's, Balsall Heath from 1973 to 1982. He was Archdeacon of Aston from 1982 to 1990; and then of Coleshill until 1993. Finally he was an Assistant Curate at Holy Trinity, Sutton Coldfield from 1993 to 1996.

Church of England titles
Preceded by Donald Tytler	Archdeacon of Aston; 1982–1990	Succeeded by John Barton
