= Mansbach (surname) =

Mansbach is a surname. Notable people with the surname include:

- Adam Mansbach (born 1976), American author
- Carl von und zu Mansbach (1790–1867), Hessian-Norwegian military officer and diplomat
- Johann Friedrich von und zu Mansbach (1744–1803), Hessian-Danish military officer
- Richard W. Mansbach (1943–2026), American political scientist
- Steven Mansbach (born 1950), American historian
