= Adolf Kohner =

Hungarian businessman, landowner and Jewish leader

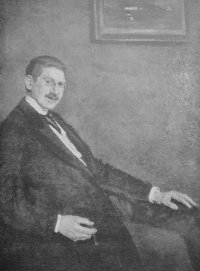
Adolf Kohner

Baron Adolf Kohner Szaszberek (Budapest, April 26, 1866 – Budapest, January 30, 1937) was a Hungarian businessman, landowner and a leading member of the Jewish community in that country.

== Life ==
In 1874 Baron Kohner founded Adolf Kohner and Sons, a private bank. Through his efforts as manager and director, the bank grew to become one of the largest private banks in Hungary. In addition to being a leading figure in Hungarian financial circles, Kohner was also one of the country's most well educated large landowner and industrialist. His range of interests and knowledge was widespread, ranging from mechanical engineering to agricultural science. He was a significant figure in the Hungarian Jewish community and served as president of the Jewish Communities Federation in Hungary.

== Art collector ==
Baron Kohner was famous for his role as an art collector and patron of the arts in Hungary. In 1902 he became president of the Hungarian National Art Association. In the same year he founded the artists’ colony in Szolnok, Hungary. His private collection was focused on the paintings of the French impressionistic and post-impressionistic periods. Among the artists represented in his collection were Théodore Géricault, Eugène Delacroix, Honoré Daumier, painters of the Barbizon school such as Jean-Baptiste-Camille Corot, Jean-François Millet, Antoine Chintreuil, Gustave Courbet, Édouard Manet, Berthe Morisot, Claude Monet, Pierre-Auguste Renoir, Paul Cézanne, Alfred Sisley, Paul Gauguin and Pierre Puvis de Chavannes. The collection also included works from other periods such as Nuns” by Alessandro Magnasco and several paintings by John Constable and Francisco Goya. Leading Hungarian artists were also represented in his collection. These included Meszoly Geza, Laszlo Paal and Mihály Munkácsy and painters of the Hungarian artists' colonies Nagybanya and Szolnok. Many of the paintings were subsequently donated by Kohner to the Art Gallery of the National Museum of Hungary.

== Salotto Kohner ==
Kohner used the earnings from his banking and other businesses to buy an estate of 28.000 acres near Szolnok, Hungary, with the goal of transforming it into a model farm and university study center. Professors and students from the Agrarian University of Budapest used this land as an experimental laboratory and it ultimately became one of the most avant-garde farming system of all time. Kohner was also a talented musician. He plays the cello and had a vast collection of Stradivarius and Guarneri violins. Among his closest friends were many famous musicians including Franz Liszt, Giacomo Puccini and Béla Bartók.

== Béla Bartók supporter ==
Kohner was a major benefactor of Hungarian composer Béla Bartók, providing him with an annual stipend for many years that enabled Bartók to travel throughout Hungary and assemble a collection of ancient Hungarian folk songs. In his memoirs Bartók recalled the help Kohner offered him in 1905 and he stated: "... he wanted me to understand that I could turn to him with confidence in case I needed money. He would be willing to help me from time to time. . It’s so kind of Kohner to be interested in my life ..". Bartók also evoked the two weeks he spent in 1918 at Kohner's castle in the Hungarian countryside: "The house was just like a hotel where guests would come and go. The home library was full of manuscripts... People talked about many topics: music, literature, Jewish issues, religion, Bolshevik movement, manufacturing, trade. Mr. Baron is familiar with music, he plays the violin ... he is a close friend of some painters (the Kohner family loves Adolf Fényes very much. He was there for few days), one of his daughters is a painter as well and she is studying at Fényes’, the other one goes to university".

== Businessman ==
At the beginning of the twentieth century, Kohner was considered one of the richest men of the Hungarian-Jewish upper class. In addition to his success as a banker, he played a prominent role in the textile, food and chemical industries of Hungary. He was also a large landowner and, with his sons, developed a successful livestock farming business and canning company.

== Social role ==
As a leading figure of the Hungarian-Jewish upper class, Kohner was a prominent social figure in the larger Hungarian community. The most important recognition of his role was the 1912 decision of Emperor Franz Joseph I of Austria to name Kohner a Baron and Court Counselor.

== Last years of life ==
In the early 1930s Kohner unsuccessfully engaged in financial speculation which had negative effects on his businesses and ultimately dragged him to the brink of bankruptcy in 1933. The following year he was forced to auction most of his art collection in order to pay off his debts. Later, he was also obliged to sell his castle and many other real estate holdings. Upon his death in 1937, his obituary, appearing in the journal Past and Future, stated that, despite the financial collapse that forced him to a retired life, Kohner had endured with dignity finding solace in his beloved books.

Kohner died on January 30th 1937 and he was buried on February 2 in the Jewish cemetery in Salgotarjan. He left four children: Karoly, Ida, wife of the painter István Farkas, Lujza, Katalin.

== Literature ==
- Alessandra Farkas: Pranzo di Famiglia, Sperling&Kupfer Editori, 2006 ISBN 88-200-4059-X.
- Vámos Éva Katalin: Egy vegyész gyáros mint a művészetek mecénása. In: Tanulmányok a természettudományok, a technika és az orvoslás történetéből. Bp.: MTESZ, 1996. 39–43. p.
- La storia della famiglia Farkas. Il talento e la cultura di una famiglia ungherese Adnkronos - 22 luglio 2006.
- MAZSIKE - Magyar Zsidó Nagyjaink

== Related pages ==
- Béla Bartók
- István Farkas
- Alessandra Farkas
