= Lajos Pósa =

Lajos Pósa may refer to:

- Lajos Pósa (writer) (1850–1914), Hungarian writer and poet
- Lajos Pósa (mathematician) (born 1947), Hungarian mathematician and educator
