= Stuart Hibberd =

British radio personality (1893–1983)

Stuart Hibberd MBE
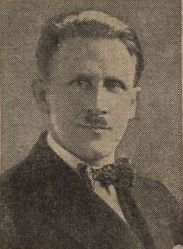
- Photo of Hibberd from the Christmas 1926 edition of The Radio Times
- Born: Andrew Stuart Hibberd; 5 September 1893; Canford Magna, Dorset, England
- Died: 1 November 1983 (aged 90); Budleigh Salterton, Devon, England
- Education: Queen Elizabeth's Grammar School, Wimborne; Weymouth College, Dorset
- Alma mater: St John's College, Cambridge
- Occupations: Radio announcer, newsreader
- Notable credit: BBC News
- Spouse: Alice Mary Chichester (m. 1923; death 1977)

Andrew Stuart Hibberd MBE (5 September 1893 – 1 November 1983) was a British radio personality for 40 years. He is perhaps best known for his announcements of the death of King George V in 1936, and of Adolf Hitler in 1945. Hibberd joined the BBC in November 1924 and became its chief radio announcer on BBC Radio until his retirement in 1951. He was the presenter of the BBC Home Service programme The Silver Lining aimed for disabled and homebound listeners. Hibberd was appointed a Member of the Order of the British Empire (MBE) and was a Fellow of the Royal Society of Arts.

== Early life and education ==
Hibberd was born in the village of Canford Magna, Dorset, England, in South West England, on 5 September 1893. He was the youngest of nine children (a brother and seven half-brothers) of the farmer William Henry Hibberd and his second wife Mary Catherine Edney. Hibberd was educated at Queen Elizabeth's Grammar School in Wimborne Minster, followed by Weymouth College, an independent school for boys in the seaside town of Weymouth in Dorset. He then won a Choral Scholarship to St John's College at the University of Cambridge and became a Choral exhibitor under Cyril Rootham.

== Life and career ==
Hibberd volunteered at the outbreak of the First World War in 1914, becoming an Army officer. He served with the Dorset Regiment at Gallipoli (in Turkey), and then in Mesopotamia and with the 2nd Battalion, 25th Punjabis in India, reaching the rank of captain. Hibberd was fluent in Hindu.

He was accepted by D'Oyly Carte Opera Company following a voice trial at the Savoy Theatre, London in 1921 but did not take up the post of singer. He joined the British Broadcasting Company (BBC) at Savoy Hill on 13 November 1924. He was the chief announcer on BBC Radio from 1928 until his retirement from the post in August 1951, having read approximately 15,000 news bulletins, introduced music programmes and speakers even though he never officially received the title of chief announcer.

Hibberd reported on events such as the 1926 United Kingdom general strike in which he often broadcast for up to an hour, the Death of Adolf Hitler, and Victory in Europe Day in 1945. He remarked he disliked television and was "too old to learn new tricks" because of his advanced age. The Times wrote that Hibberd gargled before he read the news and was of the belief that radio announcers had to wear evening dress even though they were never seen. He loosened his collar and tie to stop any constriction to his throat. Hibberd's news bulletins were provided by Reuters and dictated over the telephone to the BBC. He had a unique, immediately recognisable, voice. It could be described like someone whispering aloud. His voice was ideal for grave and solemn occasions and he is best remembered for his announcement of King George V's impending death on 20 January 1936 with the words: "The King's life is moving peacefully towards its close".

He was a defence officer during the Second World War and was second-in-command of the BBC's Home Guard Company in Bristol. Hibberd worked in presentation and was transferred before the anonymity of news readers was dropped. His anonymity was lost when he first identified himself on air in June 1941. During the Second World War, it was noted in the press that he was making mistakes because he was becoming fatigued but he continued to receive support from the listening audience. From 1949, Hibberd presented the BBC Home Service programme The Silver Lining, a Thursday afternoon programme recorded at a studio in Exeter aimed at disabled and housebound people. He continued to present The Silver Lining until it ended its run in 1964. He recorded numerous audiobooks for the blind.

Hibberd was the subject of This Is Your Life in May 1957. In January 1962, he appeared on Desert Island Discs. He chose Navarraise (from Le Cid, Act 2) by Jules Massenet as his favourite track, his chosen book was Another World than This by Victoria Sackville-West and his luxury item was a recorder. In December 1972, he returned to BBC as a continuity announcer on BBC Radio 4 for the nostalgia programme These You Have Loved. Three years later, Hibberd was hired by Burmah Oil shareholders to join its protest against the Bank of England's purchase of its stake in British Petroleum. Hibberd was appointed an Member of the Order of the British Empire (MBE) for his broadcasting in 1935, and was a Fellow of the Royal Society of Arts, and a Fellow of the Royal Society of St George, receiving its silver medal for his paper "The Coming of Age of Broadcasting" in July 1944.

== Personal life ==
He played the mouth organ. Hibberd was married to Alice Mary Chichester, daughter of Lieutenant Colonel Gerrard Chichester, from July 1923 until her death in 1977. There were no children of the marriage. He died in Budleigh Salterton, Devon on 1 November 1983, at the age of 90, and his funeral was held three days later, at St Peter's Church in Budleigh Salterton in Devon.

== Bibliography ==
- "This - Is London . . . ", memoir by Hibberd (MacDonald and Evans, London, 1950).
