= John Hindley, 1st Viscount Hyndley =

British businessman

John Scott Hindley, 1st Viscount Hyndley, GBE (24 October 1883 – 5 January 1963), known as Sir John Hindley, 1st Baronet, between 1927 and 1931 and as The Lord Hyndley between 1931 and 1948, was a British businessman. He was the first chairman of the National Coal Board at its creation on 1 January 1947.

== Background ==
Hindley was the son of the Reverend William Talbot Hindley, vicar of Meads, Sussex, and Caroline, daughter of John Scott. He was educated at Weymouth College, Weymouth between 1899 and 1901.

He took up an engineering apprentice at Murton colliery in County Durham, but did not complete the course and moved into the commercial side of mining.

== Business career ==
Hindley was a director of the Bank of England between 1931 and 1945 and he was managing director of Powell Duffryn Ltd, collieries, between 1931 and 1946. He became the first chairman of the National Coal Board at its creation on 1 January 1947, a post he held until 1951.

Despite the Attlee government's pronouncement in 1947 that "Today the mines belong to the people", in reality the same people held influence over the operation of the mines. Hindley was chairman at the time of the explosion at Easington Colliery on 29 May 1951. Facing relatives of miners waiting at the colliery gates, he announced:

Though everything has been done and is still being done, there is now no hope of any of the men being alive. This is the worst pit disaster we have had in the History of the N.C.B.

Hindley was knighted in the 1921 Birthday Honours, created a baronet, of Meads in the County of Sussex, on 18 February 1927 and elevated to the peerage as Baron Hyndley, of Meads in the County of Sussex on 21 January 1931. He was further honoured when he was appointed a Knight Grand Cross of the Order of the British Empire (GBE) in the 1939 Birthday Honours, "for public services", and made Viscount Hyndley, of Meads in the County of Sussex on 6 February 1948.

Lord Hyndley was also master of the Clothworkers' Company in 1953. The Viscount Hyndley Trophy was a trophy awarded to the British National Coal Board boxing champion.

== Family ==
Lord Hyndley married Vera Westoll in 1909. He had worked for her father James Westoll at Murton colliery. They had two daughters, Joyce and Elizabeth (Betty). A coal ship in National Coal Board fleet was named in Elizabeth's honour in 1947, the SS Betty Hindley, which became the last vessel to be lost due to World War Two enemy action, when on 7 October 1947 she detonated an unexploded WWII contact mine, just off Scarborough on the Yorkshire coast.

He died on 5 January 1963, aged 79, when the baronetcy and two peerages became extinct.

== Arms ==
Coat of arms of John Hindley, 1st Viscount Hyndley
Crest A sinister and a dexter cubit arm in armour fesswise grasping in the hands a scimitar Proper pomel and hilt Or the blade transfixing a boar's head couped Sable. Escutcheon Azure a stag lodged between three martlets Argent. Supporters (1948) On either side a hind proper the dexter gorged with a collar Gules charged with a Red rose also proper the sinister gorged with a like collar charged with four pallets Argent surmounted by a palm leaf Or. Motto Cor Non Jecur

Peerage of the United Kingdom
New creation	Viscount Hyndley; 1948–1963	Extinct
New creation	Baron Hyndley; 1931–1963	Extinct
Baronetage of the United Kingdom
New creation	Baronet (of Meads); 1927–1963	Extinct
