= Judah Wahrmann =

Hungarian rabbi

Judah Wahrmann (1791 – November 14, 1868 at Pest), was a Hungarian rabbi; son of Israel Wahrmann. He was appointed associate rabbi and teacher of religion at the gymnasium of Budapest on 9 February 1851, and was the author of Ma'areket ha-Ha'ataḳot (Ofen, 1831) and Dat Yehudah, Mosaische Religionslehre (ib. 1861; 2d ed. 1868).
