= Jim Brazier =

Anglican assistant bishop of uganda

Percy James Brazier (3 August 1903 – 30 November 1989) was an Anglican Assistant Bishop of Uganda in the mid 20th century.

Brazier was educated at Weymouth College; Emmanuel College, Cambridge; and Ridley Hall, Cambridge and ordained deacon in 1927 and priest in 1928. He was a Curate at St John the Evangelist, Blackheath until 1930 when he went to Kabale as a CMS missionary. He was Archdeacon of Ruanda-Urundi from 1946 to 1951; Assistant Bishop of Uganda for Ruanda-Urundi from 1951 to 1960; and Bishop of Rwanda and Burundi from 1960 until his retirement in 1964.

Percy James "Jim" Brazier, assistant bishop for Ruanda-Urundi (became first diocesan Bishop of Ruanda-Urundi; 3 August 1903 – 30 November 1989; deaconed 12 June 1927 & priested 3 June 1928 by Cyril Garbett at Southwark; consecrated 2 February 1951 by Geoffrey Fisher (Canterbury) at Westminster).
