= Barney McCall =

Welsh cricketer, rugby union footballer & MM recipient

Personal information
- Full name: Barney Ernest Willford McCall
- Born: 13 May 1913; Clifton, Bristol, England
- Died: 31 March 1991 (aged 77); Cardiff, Glamorgan, Wales
- Batting: Right-handed
- Bowling: Right-arm (unknown style)

Domestic team information
- Years: Team
- 1937: Minor Counties
- 1931–1936: Dorset

Career statistics
Competition	First-class
Matches	3
Runs scored	56
Batting average	9.33
100s/50s	–/–
Top score	31
Balls bowled	49
Wickets	1
Bowling average	35.00
5 wickets in innings	–
10 wickets in match	–
Best bowling	1/34
Catches/stumpings	4/–
- Source: Cricinfo, 27 July 2014

Barney Ernest Willford McCall MC (13 May 1913 – 31 March 1991) was an English-born Welsh cricketer, rugby player and British Army officer. He was born at Clifton, Bristol, and died at hospital in Cardiff, Glamorgan.

== Cricket career ==
McCall's cricketing skills first became apparent while attending Weymouth College from 1928 to 1931, with Wisden later describing him as one of the best cricketers the college produced between the world wars. His final year of attending the college saw McCall make a single appearance for Dorset in the 1931 Minor Counties Championship against Wiltshire. Having enlisted in the British Army, McCall represented the British Army cricket team from 1935, making one first-class appearance for the Army against Cambridge University in 1936. He returned to play minor counties cricket for Dorset following a five-year gap in 1936, making seven appearances for the county. The following season he was selected to play for a combined Minor Counties cricket team in a first-class match against Oxford University. McCall would make a third and final appearance in first-class cricket in 1948 for the Combined Services against Worcestershire. His three first-class matches yielded him 56 runs at an average of 9.33, with a top-score of 31.

== Rugby career ==
McCall played rugby union for Newport RFC as a winger, making two known appearances for the club in 1935/36. He was selected to play for Wales in the 1936 Home Nations Championship, making his debut against England at St Helen's a no-score draw, in doing so becoming the 500th Welshman to be capped for the country. He made two further appearances for Wales in the Championship's against Scotland and Ireland. He was one of only seven rugby players of all time to be called up for international duty whilst serving with the armed forces.

== Military career ==
McCall attended the Royal Military College, Sandhurst as a gentleman cadet and was commissioned as a second lieutenant in the Welch Regiment on 2 February 1933. He received promotion to lieutenant on 2 February 1936 and served with the Royal Army Service Corps from 16 March. His initial service with the RASC was under probation, he was officially seconded from his regiment on 16 June. During this time McCall attended the RASC Junior Officers' Course.

He returned to the Welch Regiment on 13 February 1937 before resigning his commission on 20 March. He was re-appointed to his commission with the Welch Regiment on 20 July 1938 with his seniority backdated to 3 June 1937, from the time of his reappointment he was attached to the Officers Training Corps (Junior Division) at the King's School, Canterbury. He joined the staff of the school in 1939 as the rugby coach.

McCall served in the temporary rank of major (with war-substantive rank of captain) in the 1/5th Battalion of the Welch Regiment, part of the 53rd (Welsh) Infantry Division, in the Second World War. He was with the battalion when it arrived in France at the end of June 1944 and attended the burial service of its commanding officer, Lieutenant-Colonel ERG Ripley on 1 July. On 1 March 1945 he was awarded the Military Cross for gallantry in action. His rank as captain was confirmed by promotion to substantive rank on 13 July 1946 with his seniority later being backdated to 13 May 1944. McCall, still with the Welch Regiment, received promotion to the rank of major on 13 May 1949. He retired from the army on 1 March 1958 and was granted the honorary rank of lieutenant-colonel in the Regular Army Reserve of Officers. He ceased to be liable for recall on 13 May 1963, having reached the age limit of 50 years. On 14 June 1967 McCall was appointed Deputy Lieutenant for the County of Cambridgeshire and the Isle of Ely.

McCall continued his service with the armed forces with the Army Cadet Force. He served as a lieutenant (acting major) in the Glamorgan unit and received the Cadet Forces Medal on 26 May 1970 for 12-years service. He received a clasp to the medal on 30 May 1978 in recognition of an additional 8-years service. McCall reached the age limit (65 years) for the cadet force on 13 May 1978 and resigned his commission, retaining his honorary rank of lieutenant-colonel.
