= Francis Warman =

Francis Frederic Guy Warman was Archdeacon of Aston from 1965 to 1977.

Born the son of Frederic Sumpter Guy Warman on 1 December 1904, Warman was educated at Weymouth College, Worcester College, Oxford and Ridley Hall, Cambridge. He was ordained in 1928 and served curacies in Radford, Coventry and Chilvers Coton. He held incumbencies in Selby, Leeds and Birmingham. He was Proctor in Convocation for the Diocese of Birmingham from 1945 to 1975. He died on 25 July 1991.

Church of England titles
Preceded by Maxwell Tulloch Dunlop	Archdeacon of Aston; 1912–1913	Succeeded by Donald Alexander Tytler
