= Singer and Wolfner =

Hungarian book publishing company

Sándor Singer and József Wolfner founded Singer and Wolfner Book Publisher and Bookstore in 1885. It was one of the largest and most successful of Hungarian publishers.

== History ==
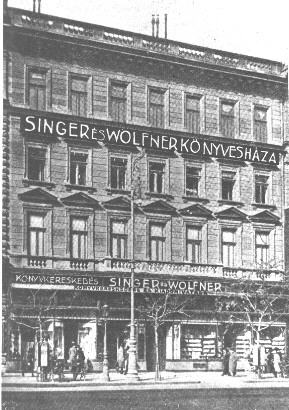
The Singer and Wolfner book shop in Budapest

During the decades following the Austro-Hungarian Compromise of 1867, and as a result of economic developments, limited liability publishing companies began to be formed. These became the business model for book and paper publishing in Hungary due to easier access to larger investment capital than the existing smaller businesses. The Singer and Wolfner publishing company was formed in 1885. Its founding members were Sándor Singer, and József Wolfner, who assumed the role of CEO. They changed their firm into the form of a limited liability company in 1923. Starting in 1943 it began to function as Új idők Irodalmi Intézet Részvénytársasag (New Times Literary Institute Ltd.).

== Their work ==
The success of the company was due primarily to its concentration on child- and youth-literature, as well as their focus on the literary preferences of the middle classes and their production of cheap and popular books in large quantities. They developed the Egyetemes Regénytár (Universal Novel Library) series based on the model of the German Engelhorn Verlag as the result of their recognition of the reading public's desire for literature that entertained. During these times, in addition to the development of old writers, many new talents were cultivated. As a result, Singer and Wolfner became the publisher of young writers, for example Ferenc Herczeg, Géza Gárdonyi, Sándor Bródy, Zoltán Ambrus, Ignotus and Viktor Rákosi. The firm published a significant portion of the works of the emerging young authors in the 1890s.

== The arts ==
Singer and Wolfner regarded as expressly important the value of the fine arts in publishing and for this reason emphasized well-prepared illustrations for carefully arranged articles. Some title pages and illustrations gave some publications practically an artistic value. After the death of Jozsef Wolfner in 1932, his son, István Farkas, took over the reins of the publishing house. In addition to his work in the company, he painted as well and as a result, the artistic aspect of publishing assumed an increasingly important role. Most of the covers, title pages and ex libris decorations were planned and drawn for the firm by Hellmann Mosonyi-Pfeiffer.

== The business ==
Around the beginning of the twentieth century, modern and high-class bookstores began to appear in Hungary. When Singer and Wolfner's bookstore opened on the Andrassy road, the firm had been in business for almost 26 years and established itself as a major force in publishing. As a result, it had a significant advantage over the newly established stores. Singer and Wolfner publishers had moved to 16 Andrassy Rd. in 1912. The store was on the main floor which, according to contemporary sources, was the most beautiful and modern one anywhere in the (Austro-Hungarian) Monarchy.

The editorial offices, located above the bookstore, was where the popular weekly magazines, En Ujsagom (My Newspaper) and Magyar Lanyok (Hungarian Girls) were published. The interior of the business, the furniture, the giant bronze chandeliers, the painting, the displays and the facades were planned by Géza Maróti, a sculptor. The woodwork was the work of Joseph Kiss, a carpenter. The storage shelves stretched from floor to ceiling and the many outstanding creations were surprisingly well organized and easily observable.

== Publications ==
=== Book series ===
- Egyetemes Regénytár (English, "University Novel Library") (1885–1931) - book series, some volumes having circulations of up to 20,000
- Filléres Könyvtár (English, "Penny Library") (1895–1915)
- Piros Könyvek (English, "Red Books") (1900-early years)
- Therapia: A Gyógyító Tudományok Könyvtára (English, "Therapy: Library of Healing Sciences") (1903–1907)
- Ifjúsági Könyvek (English, "Youth Books") (1910-some years)
- Universális Könyvtár (English, "Universal Library") (1910-some years)
- Modern Magyar Könyvtár (English, "Modern Hungarian Library") (1910-some years)
- Vidám Könyvek (English, "Fun Books") (1911–1919)
- Karriérek (English, "Careers") (1912)
- Forradalom és császárság (English, "Revolution and Empire") (1913–1914)
- Milliók Könyve (English, "Book of Millions") (1915–1920)
- Koronás Regények (English, "Crown Novels") (1917–1920)
- Magyar Írómesterek – Petőfi Társaság Jubiláris Könyvei (English, "Hungarian Writers - Jubilee Books of the Petőfi Society") (1920-some years)
- Operaismertetők (English, "Opera Reviews") (1920-some years)
- A Magyar Irodalom Jelesei (English, "Signs of Hungarian Literature") (1930-some years)
- Magyart a magyarnak – Magyar Regények (English, "Hungarian for Hungarians - Hungarian Novels") (1930-some years)
- Uj Idők lexikona (English, "New Times Lexicon") (1936–1942) - 24 volumes
- Százszorszép könyvek – Magyar Lányok Könyvtára (English, "Daisy Books - Hungarian Girls' Library) (1940-some years)

=== Periodicals ===
- Uj idõk (English, "New Times") (editor: Ferenc Herczeg) - fine arts weekly for middle-class women.
- Magyar figyelő (English, "Hungarian Observer") (editor: István Tisza).
- Művészet (English, "Fine Arts") (editor: Karoly Lyka) - subscribers to this publication were eligible to be members of the Graphic Arts Society. (Képzomuevészeti Tarsasag).

=== Hungarian Girls and My Newspaper ===
Two weekly papers started up for children and youths:

- Magyar lányok (English, "Hungarian Girls"): This illustrated weekly publication was started in 1894 by Anna Tutsek, a conservative writer for young girls. It contained articles dealing with behavior, housekeeping and body care, as well as stories, plays, poetry and letters to the editor. It was highly successful among growing girls and boys.
- Én újságom (English, "My Newspaper"): Lajos Posa wrote excellent children's poetry. He began to edit the paper in Budapest. It appeared weekly for 35 years; it was written explicitly for children. (It is not known whether he was asked by Singer and Wolfner to start it, or whether it was his idea).

== Things of interest ==
Joseph Wolfner was called ‘uncle Pepi’ in literary circles. He was an excellent tarot player, which he proved, too, at card parties at Kálmán Mikszáth’s.

== Sources ==
- Kókai, György: A könyvkereskedelem Magyarországon. Budapest: Balassi Kiadó, 1997. ISBN 9635061110. 70. oldal, http://mek.oszk.hu/03200/03233/
- Pogány, György: A magyar könyvkereskedelem rövid története a XV. század végétől 1990-ig. Budapest: Hatágú Síp Alapítvány, 2004. ISBN 9637615407
- Magyar életrajzi lexikon http://mek.oszk.hu/00300/00355/html/ABC16920/17141.htm
- Elek Artúr: Elhunyt Wolfner József = Nyugat 1932/5. http://www.epa.oszk.hu/00000/00022/00532/16615.htm

== Related Pages ==
- Jozsef Wolfner
- István Farkas
- Ferenc Herczeg
- Alessandra Farkas
