= John Steele (cricketer, born 1905) =

English cricketer and military chaplain

Personal information
- Full name: John William Jackson Steele
- Born: 30 July 1905; Wistaston, Cheshire, England
- Died: 29 March 1990 (aged 84); Powderham, Devon, England
- Batting: Right-handed
- Bowling: Right-arm medium

Domestic team information
- Years: Team
- 1938–1939: Hampshire

Career statistics
Competition	First-class
Matches	19
Runs scored	434
Batting average	16.69
100s/50s	–/–
Top score	44
Balls bowled	3,672
Wickets	66
Bowling average	25.90
5 wickets in innings	3
10 wickets in match	–
Best bowling	6/62
Catches/stumpings	9/–
- Source: Cricinfo, 23 December 2009

John William Jackson Steele MBE (30 July 1905 — 29 March 1990) was an English first-class cricketer and military chaplain.

Steele was born in July 1905 at Wistaston, Cheshire. He undertook his religious studies at St Aidan's College, being ordained at Chester Cathedral in February 1929. He joined the Royal Army Chaplains' Department in July 1931, being granted the rank of Chaplain to the Forces 4th Class. While based as a chaplain in Winchester, Steele made his debut in first-class cricket for Hampshire against Gloucestershire at Portsmouth in the 1938 County Championship. His debut was somewhat successful, with Steele scoring 73 runs across two innings and taking match figures of 7 for 144. His maiden season in county cricket saw him play thirteen matches and take 39 wickets at an average of 24.87, with one five wicket haul. Steele also made a single first-class appearance for the British Army cricket team against Oxford University in 1938, before making a further appearance for the Army against Cambridge University in 1939. He made a further five appearances for Hampshire in the 1939 County Championship, taking 18 wickets with best figures of 6 for 62 against Warwickshire, which was one of two five wicket hauls he took in 1939. Despite a strong start to the 1939 season, it was noted by Wisden that he "went lame" and could no longer play. In seventeen first-class appearances for Hampshire, he took 57 wickets at an average of 26.64; as a lower order batsman, he scored 406 runs at a batting average of 16.91, with a highest score of 44.

Steele served in the Second World War as a chaplain, during which he was made an OBE in September 1943 and an MBE in October 1945, the latter in recognition of gallantry and distinguished service in North-West Europe. Steele died in March 1990 at Powderham, Devon.
