= Snow Pendleton =

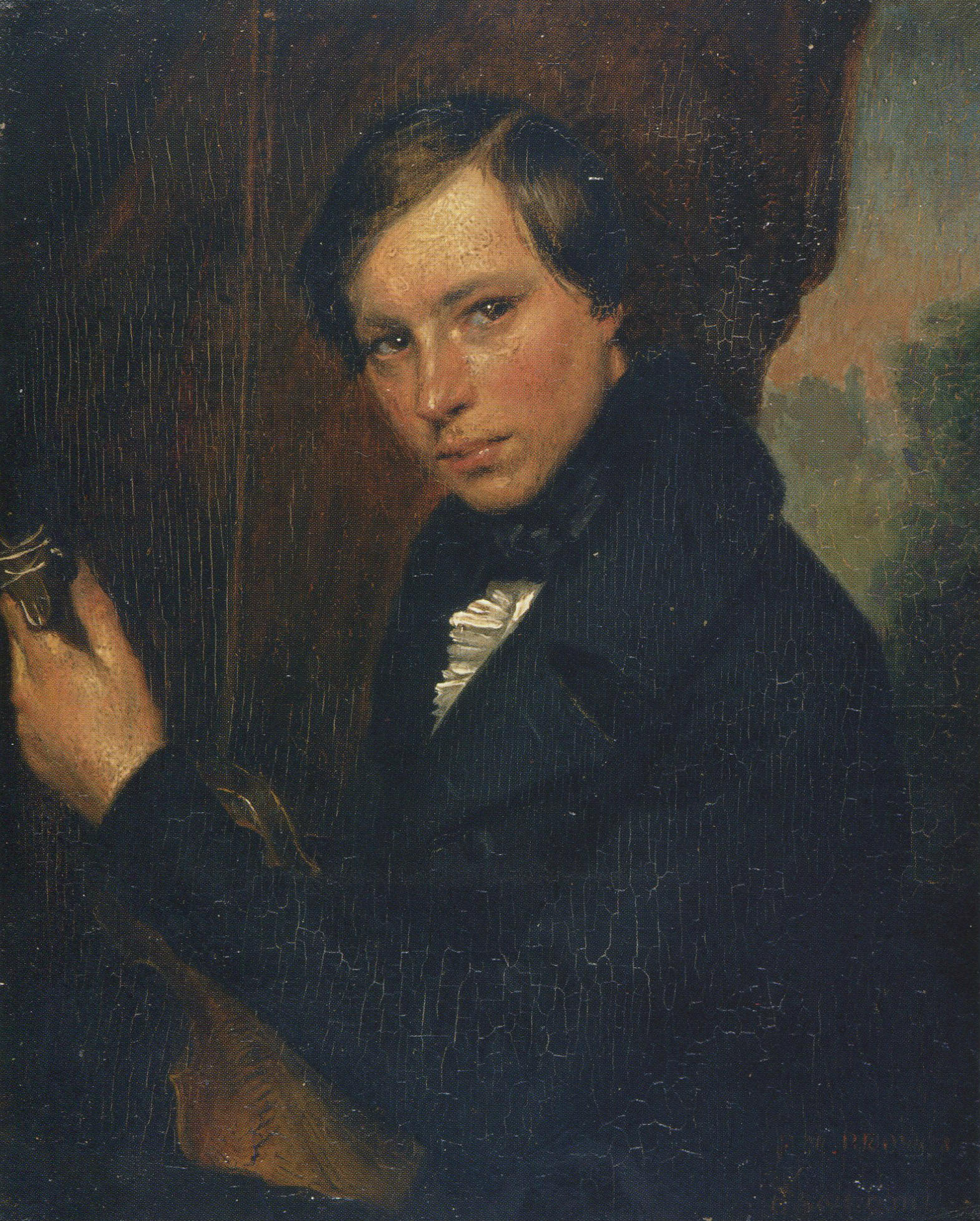
Pendleton by Ford Madox Brown (1837)

Frederick Henry Snow Pendleton (1818 – 1888) was a priest in the Church of England during the Victorian Era.

== Early years ==
Pendleton, born on 13 September 1818, was educated at the University of Ghent and at St Aidan's College, Birkenhead. While in Ghent his portrait was painted by Ford Madox Brown; this is now in Manchester Art Gallery. After being ordained in the diocese of Winchester, he served as curate of St Martin's, Guernsey, from December 1849 to June 1851, and as senior curate of St Helier, Jersey, from August 1851 to July 1853.

== Work with the Waldensians ==
He was consular chaplain to the British residents at Montevideo, Uruguay from 6 May 1854 to 31 December 1858. During his residence there 150 Protestant Waldensians, impelled by the scarcity of employment in Piedmont, left their native country and landed in Montevideo. They were followed in 1858 by about a hundred more, when the whole party settled at Florida, about sixty miles from the city. Jesuit opposition arose and the Waldensian settlers, under Pendleton's personal direction, moved to another locality known as Rosario Oriental, where his influence obtained for them a church and a school-room.

The Piedmontese Waldensian settlement prospered in the department (district) of Colonia, a few miles west of Montevideo, where the town of Colonia Valdense can now be found.

In 1857 a visitation of yellow fever swept over Montevideo, and Pendleton's services during the crisis were acknowledged by the French government, which granted him a gold medal. A similar recognition followed him from the Italian government.

From 1863 to 31 December 1868 he was chaplain to the British residents at Florence. In 1862 and again in 1867 he revisited the Waldensian colony at Rosario Oriental. He resided at the Casa Fumi, Porta Romana, Florence, until 1876, when he removed to Sydenham, Kent. There he served as curate of St Bartholomew's Church till 1879. He was then curate of Ampthill, Bedfordshire, for two years, and finally became rector of St Sampson's, Guernsey, in 1882.

== Death and legacy ==
He died at St Sampson's rectory, Guernsey, on 13 September 1888. He wrote Lettres Pastorales in 1851, and published various sermons in English and French between 1852 and 1868.
