= Donald Tytler =

Donald Tytler may refer to:

- Donald Tytler (bishop)
- Donald Tytler (sailor)
