= Andrew Wood Wilkinson =

British paediatrician

- Born: 19 April 1914; Taunton, England
- Died: 18 August 1995 (aged 81) 18 August 1995 in Castle Douglas
- Education: University of Edinburgh Medical School
- Known for: First Professor of Paediatric Surgery in the UK; President of the Royal College of Surgeons of Edinburgh
- Awards: CBE
- Scientific career
- Fields: Paediatrics
- Workplaces: Royal Hospital for Sick Children, Edinburgh; Aberdeen Royal Infirmary; Royal Aberdeen Children's Hospital; University of London; Great Ormond Street Hospital

Andrew Wood Wilkinson CBE (born 19 April 1914 in Taunton, died 18 August 1995 in Castle Douglas, Kirkcudbrightshire) was a British paediatrician of Scottish extraction and the first Professor of Paediatric Surgery in the UK.

== Life ==
Wilkinson took his early primary education at his local school, before being sent to Weymouth College public school. Wilkinson then attended University of Edinburgh Medical School, graduating MB, ChB with first class honours in 1937 and winning the Pattison prize in clinical surgery. Wilkinson remained in Edinburgh until 1949, taking several surgical posts, including a position at Royal Hospital for Sick Children, Edinburgh. In 1940 he became a Fellow of the Royal College of Surgeons of Edinburgh Fellowship of the Royal Colleges of Surgeons.

== Career ==
Portrait of Andrew Wood Wilkinson by William Bowyer that hangs in the building of the Royal College of Surgeons of Edinburgh

During World War II Wilkinson was conscripted into the Royal Army Medical Corps from 1942 to 1946. Wilkinson was promoted to lieutenant colonel, initially taking part in the Normandy landings and then later posted to India to take part in the Burma Campaign and Operation Zipper, eventually returning to Edinburgh after the war. Wilkinson initially took the position of clinical tutor at the University of Edinburgh, then later a position as lecturer in surgery. In 1953, Wilkinson moved to Aberdeen, where he held the dual position of senior lecturer and junior surgeon, at both the Aberdeen Royal Infirmary and the Royal Aberdeen Children's Hospital. It was while working in Aberdeen in 1955, that Wilkinson's seminal work, Body Fluids in Surgery, was first published. In 1957 he was elected a member of the Harveian Society of Edinburgh. In 1958, Wilkinson was appointed Nuffield professor of paediatric surgery at the Institute of Child Health at the University of London and as a surgeon working at Great Ormond Street Hospital. On retiral in 1979, he was made professor emeritus professor. In 1979, Wilkinson retired and went to live close to the Solway Firth. He began to lose his sight in his later years.

In 1941, Wilkinson married Joan Sharp, an artist and potter, in Edinburgh. They had two daughters, Jane and Caroline, and two sons, Angus and Peter.

== Awards and honours ==
- Hunterian Professor, Royal College of Surgeons in 1965.
- Wilkison was President of the Royal College of Surgeons of Edinburgh between 1976 and 1979.
- Wilkinson was appointed a CBE in 1979.

== Bibliography ==
- Body Fluids in Surgery by A.W. Wilkinson., Edinburgh; London: E. & S. Livingstone, 1955.
