= Elek Benedek =

Hungarian journalist and writer

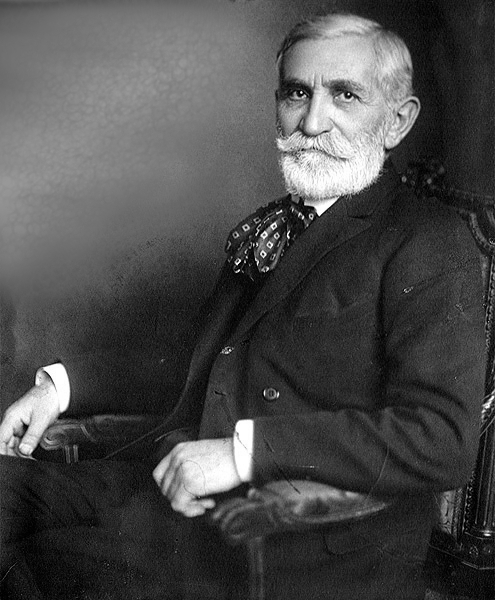
Elek Benedek c. 1925

Benedek Elek (eastern name order; western name order "Elek Benedek"; 30 September 1859 – 17 August 1929) was a Hungarian journalist and writer, widely known as "The Great Folk-Tale Teller" of The "Szekely Hungarian" Fairy-Tales.

== Biography ==
Born in Kisbacon, Transylvania, Austrian Empire. He studied in Székelyudvarhely (today, Odorheiu Secuiesc), and later in Budapest. He went as a student with Jób Sebesi to collect folklore elements. The result was a collection of "Transylvanian Folk Tales", which was met with so much positive critique, that the young Elek Benedek cut short his studies. He worked at first as a journalist for Budapest Hírlap ("Budapest Newspaper") and for other newspapers.

He was a member of the Hungarian Parliament in Budapest between 1887 and 1892. In his speeches he engaged in favor of youth literature and "Folk-Poetry", folk language and public education.

Benedek was the father of author and translator Marcell Benedek (1885-1969).

=== As editor and writer ===
In 1889 he founded, together with Lajos Pósa, the first Hungarian literary magazine for young people, Az Én Újságom ("My Magazine"). He was the editor of Jó Pajtás ("Good Fellow") with Zsigmond Sebők.

He also edited a series of books for youth, called Kis Könyvtár ("Small Library"); this later appeared as Benedek Elek Kis Könyvtára ("Small Library of Benedek Elek").

In 1900 he joined the "Kisfaludy Group/Kisfaludy Tarsasag", a group of famous Hungarian writers and poets. He also wrote poems, dramas, novels and historical fiction books, but the most famous were his "Szekely Fairy-Tales".

In 1885 the compilation Székely Tündérország ("Szekler Fairy-land") was published, which contained the first original fairy tales from the authors. Six years later, in 1891, the Székely mesemondó ("Szekler Storyteller") appeared.

Benedek's biggest challenge was the Magyar mese- és mondavilág (World of Hungarian Tales and Legends), a collection in 5 volumes published between 1894 and 1896 and dedicated to the Hungarian Millennia.

In addition to the original stories he made translations, including many tales from Grimm's Fairy Tales and Arabian Nights to Hungarian.

After the Treaty of Trianon of 1920 (which transferred sovereignty over Transylvania to Romania), he went back to his native village, Kisbacon, where he edited the youth magazine Cimbora ("Friend") until he died.
