= Adolf Fényes =

Hungarian artist (1867–1945)

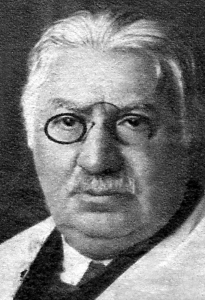
- Born: April 29, 1867

Adolf Fényes, originally Fischmann (29 April 1867 in Kecskemét – 14 March 1945 in Budapest) was a Hungarian painter of Jewish ancestry. He is best known for his cycle of paintings; The Life of a Poor Man and a series of still-lifes, done as table settings.

== Biography ==
His father, Simon Henrik Fischmann (1821–1879), was a Rabbi and his grandfather, Israel ben Solomon Wahrmann, was the first officially recognized Rabbi of the Jewish community in Pest. His uncle, Moritz Wahrmann, was the first Jewish member of the National Assembly. After his father's death, his family moved to Budapest and took the Hungarian name "Fényes".

He initially studied law, but abandoned that subject in favor of art. From 1884 to 1887, he studied at the Royal Drawing School with Bertalan Székely and János Greguss. He then moved to Weimar, where he studied with Max Thedy from 1887 to 1890. The following year found him in Paris, studying with William-Adolphe Bouguereau at the Académie Julian. From there, he returned to Weimar for two more years of study with Thedy. Upon returning home, he was enrolled in the master classes of Gyula Benczúr from 1894 to 1898.

He spent the year 1900 travelling through Italy and France, then became one of the founders of the Szolnok Art Colony. From 1902, he spent every summer there. During the short-lived Hungarian Soviet Republic, he served as a member of the "Artistic Executive Committee". In 1936, his health began to fail and he painted less.

In 1944, he received an exemption from the government of Miklós Horthy and was able to continue painting. This respite was brief, however. When the Arrow Cross Party took power, he was forced to enter the Budapest Ghetto and barely survived the Siege. Two months later, he died. Sources differ as to whether he suffered a stroke and died in a hospital, or died from hunger, at home.

Streets have been named after him in Kecskemét, Szolnok and Budapest.

== Selected paintings ==
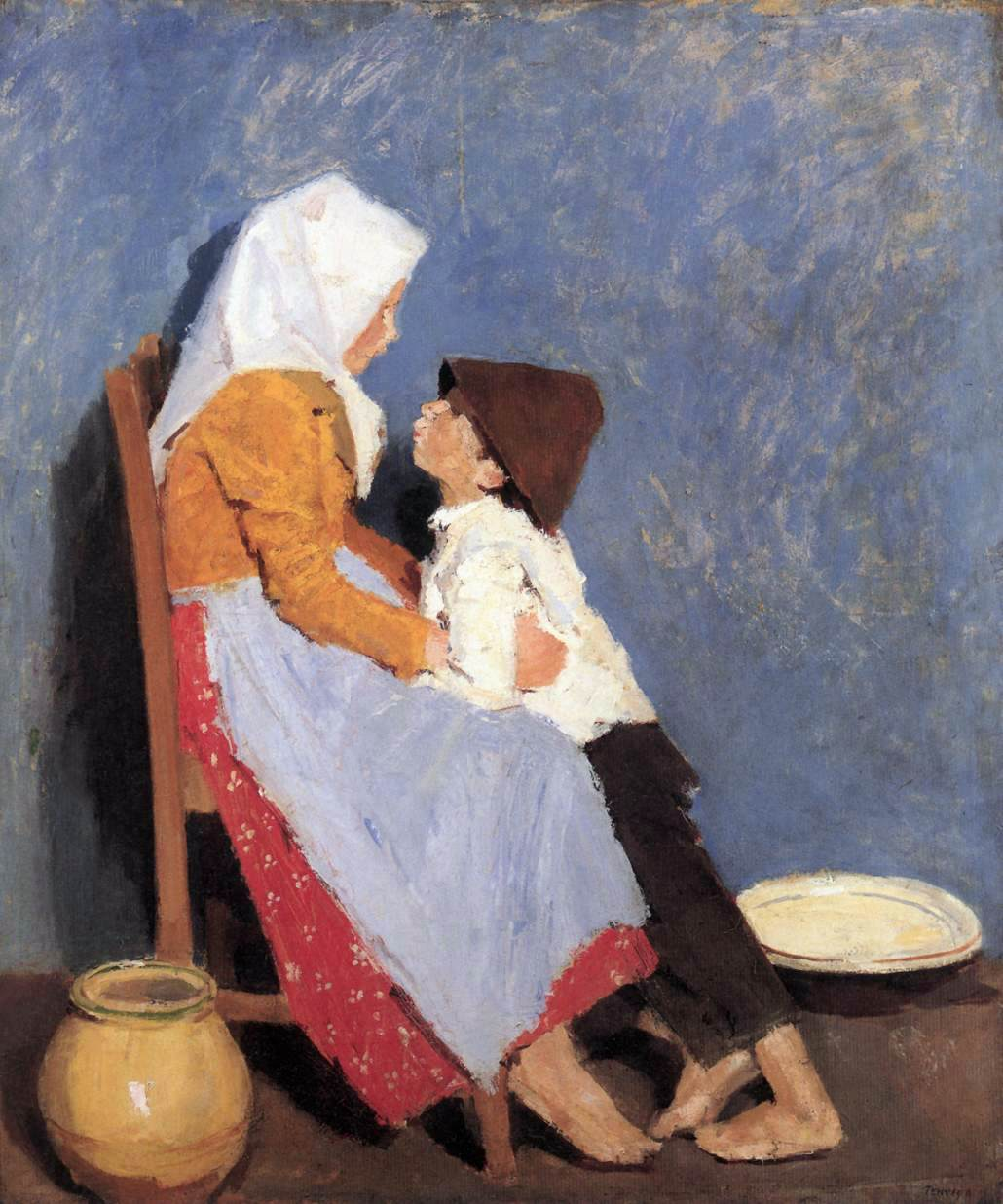
Brother and Sister (1906)

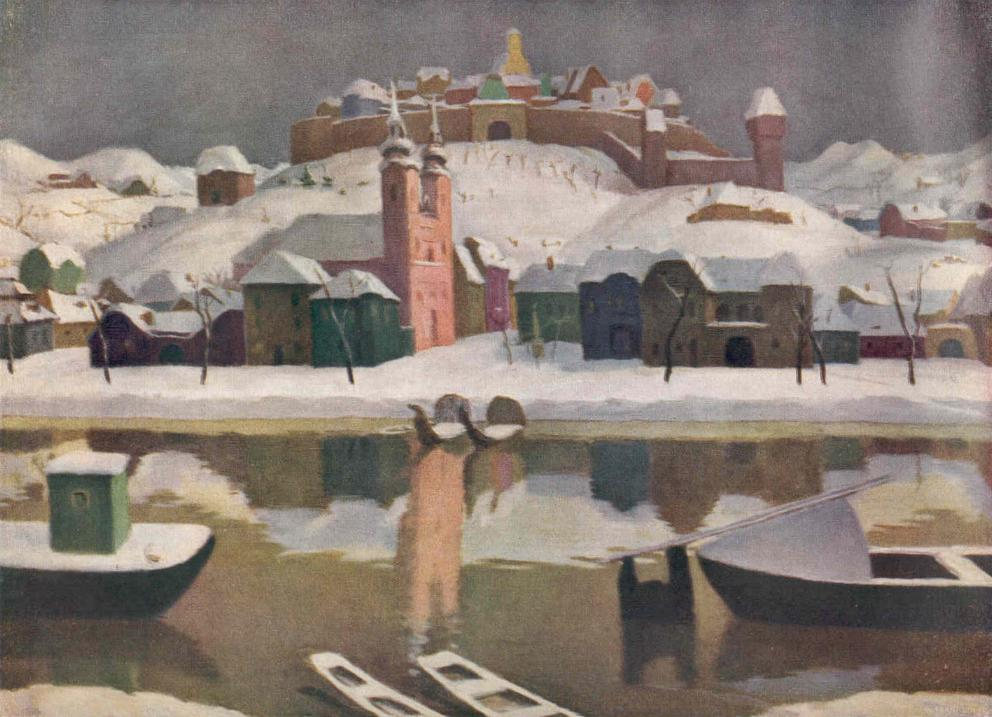
Snowy City

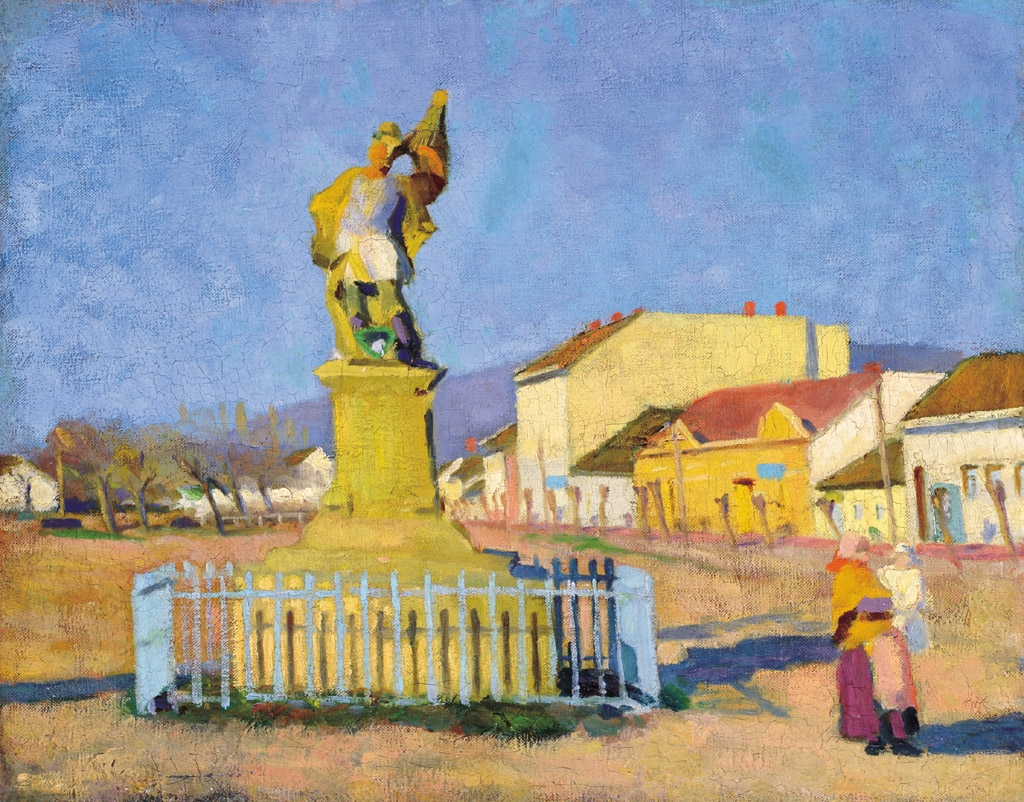
Florian Square (1910)

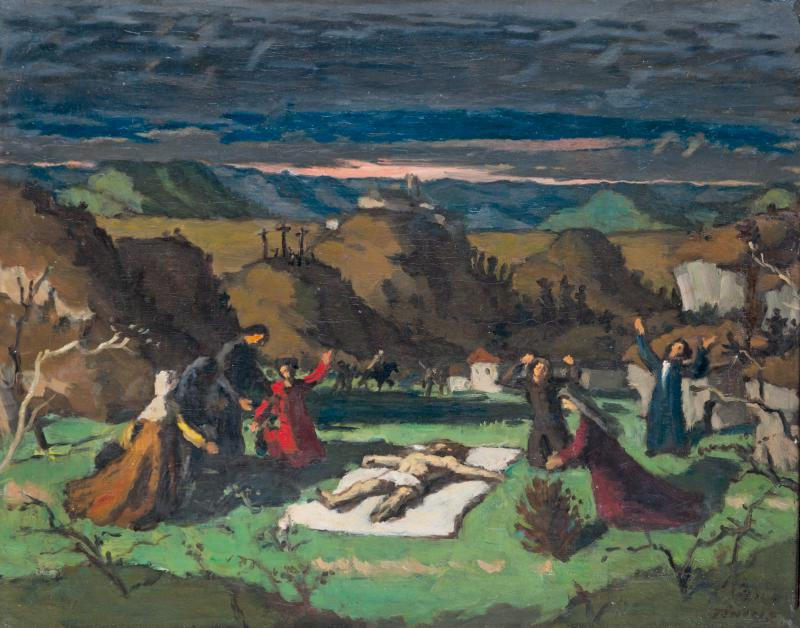
The Victim

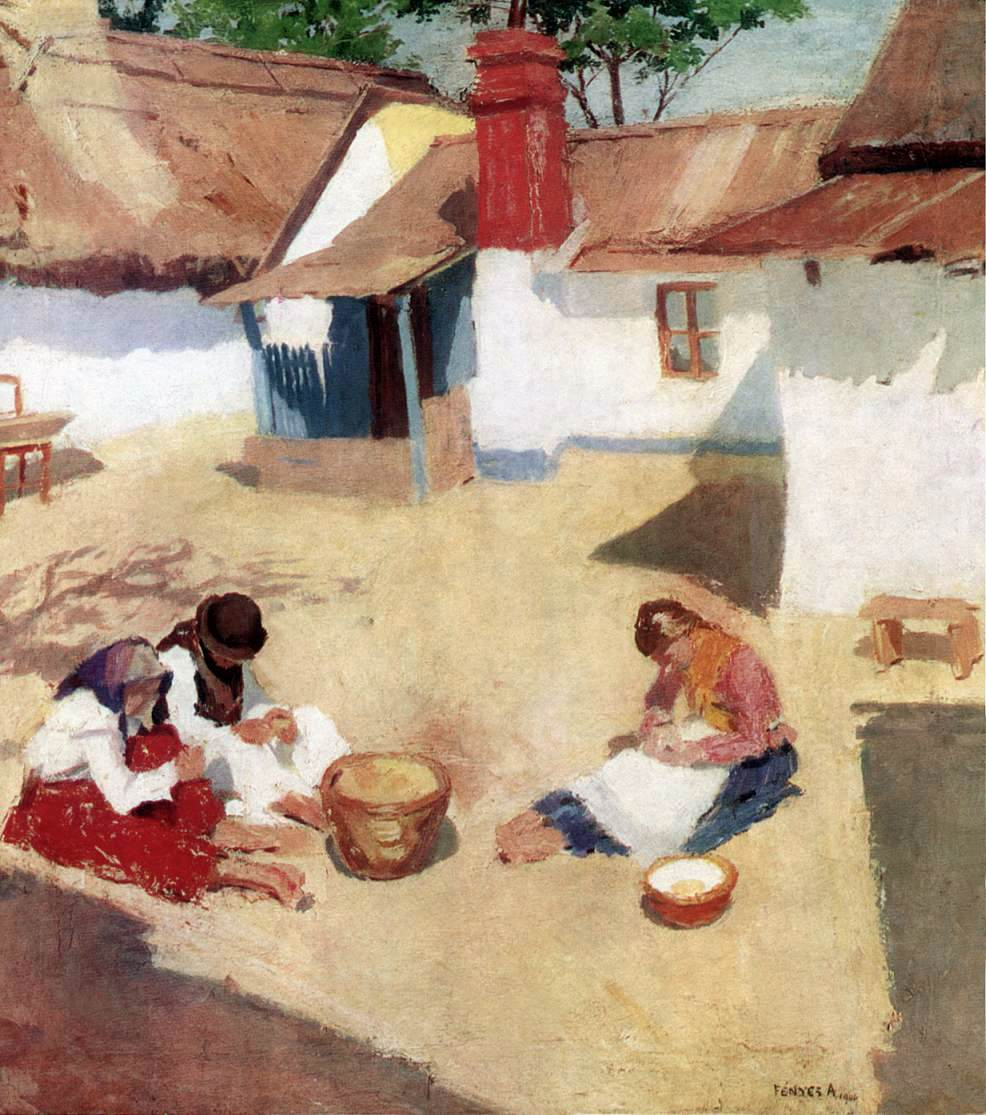
Bean Huskers (1904)
