= Jozsef Wolfner =

Hungarian publisher (1856–1932)

József Wolfner (Arad, June 5, 1856 – Budapest, February 16, 1932) was a Hungarian publisher, founder of the publishing house Singer and Wolfner.

"He was a bourgeois, and in Hungary there are bourgeois, proletarians and Bohemians, but the real bourgeois is not common. Wolfner was a real bourgeois whose lifestyle was the dignity and enthusiasm for his job. He perfectly adhered to Baudelaire’s expression that stated: "You have to work, because work is less boring than fun." Well, Wolfner was a man who was never bored. His life was dedicated to design and creativity". – From Ferenc Herczeg’s memorial speech

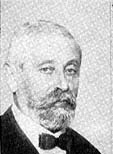
József Wolfner, was a Hungarian publisher.

== Life ==
Little is known about József Wolfner’s life. In 1885, after completing his university studies, he founded along with Sandor Singer the publishing house Singer and Wolfner which was mainly devoted to literary works for children. In 1923 Wolfner transformed the publishing house into a joint stock company assuming the role of President and Director. Singer and Wolfner became soon well known for its works on economic issues and for the publication of significant journals and books. The library was located in Budapest, at 16 Andrássy Street. The publisher’s office was on the top floor of the same building.

== Editorial politics ==
At the beginning of the twentieth century Jozsef Wolfner was a businessman and known as a man of letters. The formula to his success was his ability to quickly perceive the needs of readers. Among the authors published by Singer and Wolfner were Ferenc Herczeg, Géza Gárdonyi, Kalman Csátó, Miklos Suranyi, along with Beniczky Bajza Lenke and Hedwig Courths-Mahler.

Wolfner's attention was mainly directed to the taste of the local middle class and the intellectual bourgeois. This literature was suitable for young adults since the books were simple, easy to read and in paperback formats. The most successful works were those by Lajos Posa and Zsigmond Sebok.

The publishing house became also famous for its founder's passion for art collecting and patronage. The latter's son, István Farkas, a famous and recognized painter, followed the path of his father by becoming an art collector and patron as well. He collaborated with Jenő Barcsay, Gyula Hincz, Lajos Szalay and Tibor Vilt. Farkas was also the publishing house Director from 1932 to 1944 when Singer and Wolfner assumed the name of Literary Institute of Modern Times.

== Publications ==
- 1885: Series of novels for adults (1885 -1931). Until 1917, published more than 500 volumes.
- 1889: My newspaper - magazine for children. Editor Lajos Posa.
- 1889: Economic Library - collection of notebooks for boys (350 volumes).
- 1895: Modern Times - illustrated weekly magazine of art and classical literature for readers of the middle-class conservative. Editor: Ferenc Herczeg. The employees were writers Sandor Brody and Gardonyi Geza Kalman and Mikszath. After 1945 the editor was the poet Jozsef Fodor that, for the first two numbers, collaborated with Lajos Kassak. The magazine was published until 1949.
- The encicopledia of modern times - in version 12 and 24 volumes.
- 1895: Hungarian Girls - magazine for teenage girls. Editor Anna Tutsek.
- 1902: Art Magazine.
- 1911 Weekly magazine Hungarian Observatory.
- 1915: Book of Millions.
- 1930: The Art Hongrois. Art publishing Franco-Hungarian about major Hungarian painters. Editor Francois Gachot. Edited volumes: József Rippl-Rónai, Tivadar Kosztka Csontváry, István Nagy, Gyula Derkovits, Jozsef Egry.

== Special editions ==
- Lajos Bíró
- Sándor Bródy
- Imre Farkas
- Pal Farkas
- Geza Gardonyi
- Ferenc Herczeg: all the works - 1926 special edition of commemoration.
- Gyula Krúdy
- Karoly Lovik
- Gyorgy Lorinc
- Lajos Posa
- Mihaly Szabolcska
- Istvan Szomahazy
- Bela Toth:Anecdotes in six volumes.
- Ferenc Gaspar: Around the earth. Prestigious geographical works.

== See also ==
- Singer and Wolfner
- István Farkas
- Ferenc Herczeg
- Alessandra Farkas
