= Brian Russell (priest) =

British Anglican priest (born 1950)

Brian Kenneth Russell (born 1 August 1950) is a British Anglican priest. He was Archdeacon of Aston from 2005 to 2014.

Russell was educated at Bristol Grammar School, Trinity Hall Cambridge and Ripon College Cuddesdon. He was ordained deacon in 1976, and priest in 1977. He was Curate at St Matthew, Redhill from 1976 to 1979; Priest in charge at St John, Kirk Merrington from 1979 to 1983; Director of Studies and Lecturer in Christian Doctrine at Lincoln Theological College from 1983 to 1986; Secretary to the Committee for Theological Education of the ACCM from 1986 to 1993; and the Bishops Director for Ministries for the Diocese of Birmingham from 1993 until his appointment as Archdeacon.

Since 2014 he has been Senior Chaplain at St Edmund, Oslo.

Church of England titles
| Preceded by John Barton | Archdeacon of Aston; 2005–2014 | Succeeded by Simon Heathfield |
