= Ronald Brockman =

Royal Navy vice-admiral (1909–1999)

Vice-Admiral Sir Ronald Brockman KCB CSI CIE CVO CBE KStJ
- Brockman in 1960
- Born: 8 March 1909
- Died: 3 September 1999 (aged 90)
- Military career
- Allegiance: United Kingdom
- Branch: Royal Navy
- Service years: 1927–1965
- Rank: Vice-Admiral
- Conflicts: World War II
- Awards: Knight Commander of the Order of the Bath Companion of the Order of the Star of India; Companion of the Order of the Indian Empire Commander of the Royal Victorian Order; Commander of the Order of the British Empire; The Most Venerable Order of the Hospital of St John of Jerusalem

Vice-Admiral Sir Ronald Vernon Brockman KCB CSI CIE CVO CBE KStJ (8 March 1909 – 3 September 1999) was a British senior officer of the Royal Navy. He served under Lord Mountbatten and participated in accepting the surrender of the Japanese Fleet in 1945. Sir Ronald was the elder son of Engineer Rear-Admiral Henry Stafford Brockman CB. He was descendant of the English Brockman family, and was Gentleman Usher to the Queen from 1967 to 1979.

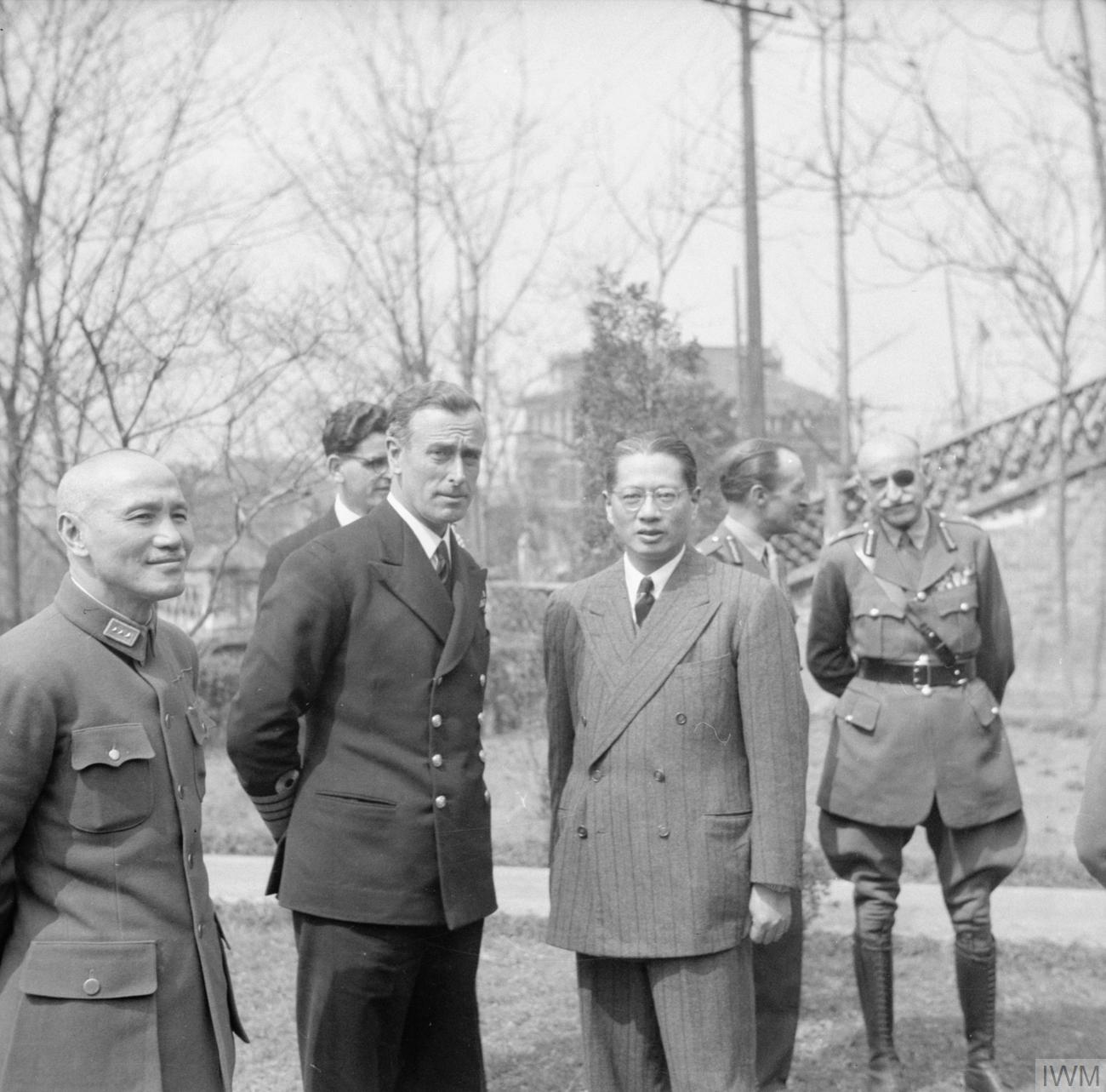
Supreme Allied Commander South East Asia Mountbatten with General Chiang Kai-Shek (left) and Dr T V Soong (right). In the background are Captain R V Brockman, Lt Gen F A M Browning and General Carton de Wiart VC at Chongqing.

== Military service ==
Sir Ronald was educated at Weymouth College in Dorset and joined the Royal Navy in 1927 as a paymaster cadet (later Supply Officer). He was promoted to paymaster sub-lieutenant on 16 April 1930 (seniority from 1 September 1929) and to paymaster lieutenant on 1 October 1931. He served as the Assistant Secretary to the First Sea Lord, Admiral of the Fleet Sir Roger Backhouse from 1938 to 1939 and was promoted to paymaster lieutenant commander on 1 October 1939.

He was the Admiral's Secretary to Admiral of the Fleet Sir Dudley Pound during World War II from 1939 to 1943. Promoted to paymaster commander on 31 December 1943, he served as Admiral's Secretary to Admiral of the Fleet Lord Louis (Francis Albert Victor) Mountbatten (Lord Mountbatten of Burma from 1946) from 1943 to 1959 and as an acting captain was the Private Secretary to Mountbatten as Governor General of India from 1947 to 1948. Finally, he served as the Senior Staff Officer to the Chief of Defence Staff within the Ministry of Defence from 1959 to 1965. He was promoted to the substantive rank of captain (S) on 30 June 1953. He was promoted to rear admiral on 7 July 1960, and to vice-admiral on 6 April 1963. He retired from the Royal Navy on 6 December 1965.

He was appointed a KCB in the 1965 New Year Honours, CSI 1947, CIE 1946, CVO 1979 and CBE 1943. He was made a KStJ in 1985 and among his foreign awards were the Special Rosette of Cloud and Banner (China) 1948, Chevalier Legion of Honour and Croix de Guerre with Palm (France) 1950 and Bronze Star Medal (USA) 1947.

== Personal life and death ==
In 1932 Brockman married Marjorie Jean Butt; they had one son and three daughters. He died on 3 September 1999, aged 90. He was the last surviving Companion of the Order of the Star of India. At his death, the Queen was represented by Sir Carron Grieg and the Duke of Edinburgh was represented by Rear-Admiral Sir Robert Woodard at a service of thanksgiving for Sir Ronald's life and service. The Prince of Wales was represented by Vice-Admiral Sir Christopher Morgan.

== Sources ==
- National Army Museum, London: The papers of Gen Sir Roy Bucher include correspondence with Brockman 1961-1972
- Times Newspapers Limited, Edition 1FWED 17 November 1999, Page 24 Vice-Admiral Sir Ronald Brockman;Memorial services;Court & Social
- Who's Who 1998
