= Simon Heathfield =

The Venerable Simon Heathfield
- Archdeacon of Aston
- Church: Church of England
- Diocese: Diocese of Birmingham
- In office: November 2014 to September 2022
- Predecessor: Brian Russell

Orders
- Ordination: 1999 (deacon); 2000 (priest)

Personal details
- Born: Simon David Heathfield; 1967 (age 58–59)
- Denomination: Anglicanism
- Spouse: Rachel
- Children: Two
- Education: University of Birmingham; Ridley Hall, Cambridge; Fitzwilliam College, Cambridge

Simon David Heathfield (born 1967) is a British Anglican priest who served as Archdeacon of Aston in the Church of England.

== Early life and education ==
Heathfield was born in 1967. He was brought up in London and the South East of England. He studied music at the University of Birmingham, graduating with a Bachelor of Music (BMus) degree in 1988.

After a number of varied jobs, including as a Royal Air Force officer, an insurance manager and an auxiliary nurse, Heathfield began working as a Church and Community Youth Worker. He then felt the call to ordination and entered Ridley Hall, Cambridge, an Open Evangelical Anglican theological college, in 1996. He spent the next three years studying theology, completing a Bachelor of Theology (BTh) degree at Fitzwilliam College, Cambridge, and training for ordained ministry.

== Ordained ministry ==
Heathfield was ordained in the Church of England as a deacon in 1999 and as a priest in 2000. From 1999 to 2002, he served his curacy at the Church of the Good Shepherd, Heswall in the Diocese of Chester. Then, from 2002 to 2005, he worked with the Church Pastoral Aid Society as its Vocation and Ministry Advisor; this was a national role with the aim to "encourage vocations and develop leadership". Having returned to parish ministry, he served as Team Rector of Walthamstow in the Diocese of Chelmsford between 2006 and 2014. He was also Area Dean of Waltham Forest from 2012 to 2014.

In July 2014, it was announced that Heathfield would be the next Archdeacon of Aston in the Diocese of Birmingham. In November 2014, he was welcomed into the diocese during a service at St Philip's Cathedral, Birmingham. On 30 September 2022, Heathfield resigned his archdeaconry.

== Personal life ==
Heathfield is married to Rachel. Together they have two children.
