= John Barton (priest) =

British Anglican priest

John Greenwood Barton (born 5 June 1936) is a retired British Anglican priest. He was Archdeacon of Aston from 1990 to 2003.

Barton was educated at Battersea Grammar School and the London College of Divinity. He was Assistant Curate at St Mary Bredin, Canterbury from 1963 to 1966; Vicar of Whitfield with West Langdon from 1966 to 1975; Vicar of St Luke, South Kensington from 1975 to 1983; Area Dean of Chelsea from 1980 to 1983; and Chief Broadcasting Officer for the Church of England from 1983 until his appointment as Archdeacon of Aston.

Church of England titles
Preceded by John Cooper	Archdeacon of Aston; 1990–2003	Succeeded by Brian Russell
