= Bishop of Manchester =

Diocesan bishop in the Church of England

- Bishopric

anglican
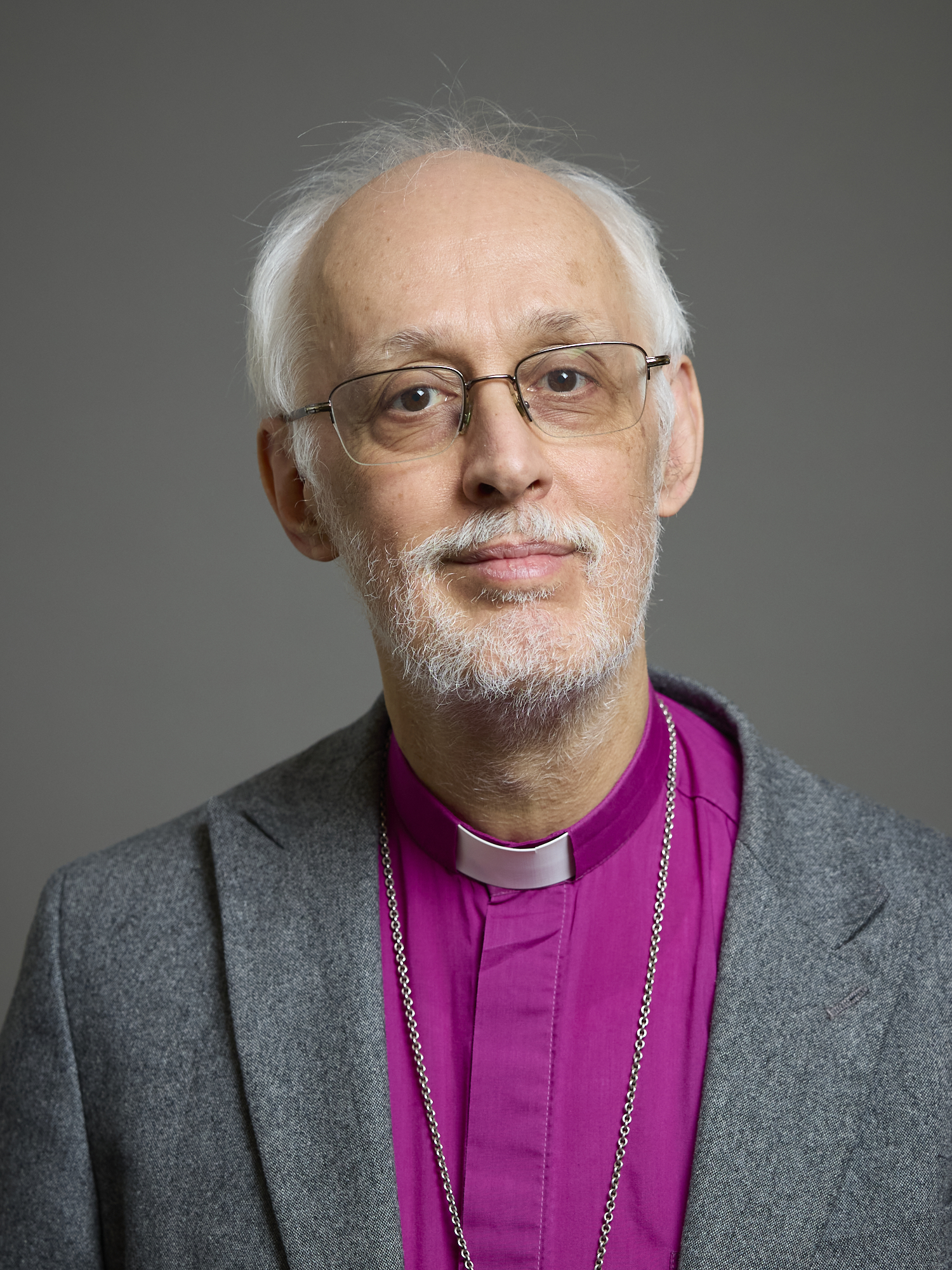
- Incumbent; David Walker

Location
- Ecclesiastical province: York
- Residence: Bishopscourt, Broughton

Information
- First holder: James Prince Lee
- Established: 1847
- Diocese: Manchester
- Cathedral: Manchester Cathedral

The Bishop of Manchester is the ordinary of the Church of England Diocese of Manchester in the Province of York.

The current bishop is David Walker who was enthroned on 30 November 2013. The bishop's official residence is Bishopscourt, Broughton, Salford.

== History ==
The Diocese of Manchester was founded in 1847. With the growth of the population in and around Manchester, the bishop appointed the first suffragan bishop, the Bishop of Hulme, in 1924 to assist in overseeing the diocese. Three years later a second was appointed, the Bishop of Middleton. After nearly sixty years, the third and final suffragan bishop, the Bishop of Bolton, was appointed in 1984.

== List of bishops ==
Bishops of Manchester
From	Until	Incumbent	Notes
1848	1869	James Prince Lee	Died in office.
1870	1885	James Fraser	Died in office; in the ensuing vacancy, John Mitchinson was acting bishop.
1886	1903	James Moorhouse	Translated from Melbourne; retired; died 1915.
1903	1921	Edmund Knox	Translated from Coventry; retired; died 1937.
1921	1929	William Temple	Translated to York then Canterbury; died in office 1944.
1929	1947	Guy Warman	Translated from Chelmsford; retired; died 1953.
1947	1970	William Greer	Retired; died 1972.
1970	1978	Patrick Rodger	Translated to Oxford; retired; died 2002.
1979	1992	Stanley Booth-Clibborn	Retired; died 1996.
1993	2002	Christopher Mayfield	Translated from Wolverhampton; retired.
2002	2013	Nigel McCulloch	Translated from Wakefield.
2013	incumbent	David Walker	Translated from Dudley

== Assistant bishops ==
Among those who have served as assistant bishops of the diocese are:

- 1887 – 1901 (d.): Francis Cramer-Roberts, Vicar of Blackburn, Archdeacon of Blackburn (1900 onwards) and former Bishop of Nassau

== See also ==
- Church of England
- David Walker (bishop of Manchester)
- Historical development of Church of England dioceses
