= Alessandra Farkas =

Italian-American journalist and writer

- Born: August 9, 1954 (age 72); Rome
- Occupations: Journalist, writer

Alessandra Farkas (born August 9, 1954) is an Italian-American journalist and writer.

== Family ==
Alessandra Farkas is the third of five children of Maria Ortenzi, textile designer born in Rome, and Paolo Farkas, Hungarian artist born in Paris, forced to leave Budapest in 1948. Together they pioneered the Italian textile design industry in the 60's and 70's. One of her great-grandfathers, Baron Adolf Kohner, was the president of the Federation of Jewish Communities in Hungary between the two World Wars. Her other great-grandfather, Jozsef Wolfner (1856-1932), a prominent art collector, was the founder of the book publishing house Singer and Wolfner. Her grandfather, István Farkas, was one of the prominent Eastern European painters affiliated with the Ecole de Paris. Her maternal grandfather, Luigi Ortenzi, was a respected Naïve art painter of Italian landscapes.

== Journalistic career ==
After studying Languages and Comparative Literature at the University of Florence, in 1981 Alessandra moved to Manhattan, where she lived with her husband and two children. She is a member of PEN American Center.

She began her journalistic career in 1981 as a New York reporter for the weekly magazine L'Europeo.

In 1985 she started writing for the leading Italian daily Corriere della Sera, then directed by Piero Ostellino. In 1988, then director Ugo Stille named her United States correspondent for Corriere della Sera. Since that time she has written about many aspects of American society, from politics to culture, from entertainment to technology. During a thirty plus year career with Corriere della Sera she has interviewed numerous Nobel Prize winners such as Isaac Bashevis Singer, Saul Bellow, Franco Modigliani, Elie Wiesel, Toni Morrison, Shirin Ebadi and Wole Soyinka; leading political figures including Hillary Clinton, Ban Ki-moon, Leon Panetta, Nancy Pelosi, Mario Cuomo, Ed Koch, Bob Dole, Condoleezza Rice, Rudolph Giuliani, Newt Gingrich and Rick Santorum; famous writers and literary prize winners including Arthur Miller, Susan Sontag, Cynthia Ozick, Don DeLillo, Philip Roth, Norman Mailer, John Updike, William Styron, E.L. Doctorow, Frank McCourt, Gore Vidal, Joyce Carol Oates, Paul Auster, Carl Bernstein, Jonathan Franzen, Jeffrey Eugenides, Khaled Hosseini, Annie Proulx, Michael Chabon, Jonathan Safran Foer, Jonathan Lethem, David Leavitt, Francis Fukuyama, Jay McInerney, Bret Easton Ellis, John Grisham, Scott Turow, John Irving, Alice Walker, Salman Rushdie, Gay Talese, Patricia Cornwell, Danielle Steel, Amiri Baraka, Norman Manea, Peter Carey, Louise Erdrich, Junot Diaz, Jennifer Egan, Elizabeth Strout, Katherine Boo. During that period she has also interviewed intellectual luminaries and pioneers such as Harold Bloom, Lawrence Ferlinghetti, Ruth Wisse, Camille Paglia, Daniel Goldhagen, Alan Dershowitz, Simon Wiesenthal, Naomi Klein, Naomi Wolf, Noam Chomsky, George Soros, John Kenneth Galbraith, Larry Flynt and Hugh Hefner.

She has also interviewed Academy Award winners such as Paul Newman, Elizabeth Taylor, Jack Lemmon, Dennis Hopper, Robert Altman, Steven Spielberg, Woody Allen, Francis Ford Coppola, Martin Scorsese, the Coen brothers, Oliver Stone, Spike Lee, Meryl Streep, Robert De Niro, Daniel Day-Lewis, Robin Williams, Al Pacino, Kirk Douglas, Brad Pitt, Demi Moore, Dustin Hoffman, Jodie Foster, Robert Redford, Jane Fonda, Julia Roberts, Richard Gere, Susan Sarandon, Sylvester Stallone, Sarah Jessica Parker, John Turturro, Federico Fellini, Marcello Mastroianni, Franco Zeffirelli, Bernardo Bertolucci, Sophia Loren, Roberto Benigni and international music stars including Frank Sinatra, Sammy Davis Jr., Luciano Pavarotti, Ella Fitzgerald, Aretha Franklin, Joan Baez, Plácido Domingo, Liza Minnelli, Stevie Wonder, Bruce Springsteen, Mick Jagger, Prince and Patti Smith.

For Corriere della Sera, Alessandra Farkas has also conducted a series of interviews with American and Italian art giants including Leo Castelli, Alex Katz, James Rosenquist, Robert Wilson, Richard Serra, Frank Stella, Renzo Piano, Daniel Libeskind, Yoko Ono, Sandro Chia, Francesco Clemente, Annie Leibovitz, Art Spiegelman, Keith Haring, Jean-Michel Basquiat and Marina Abramović. Another series was focused upon young writers, all sons and daughters of famous authors such as Rebecca Miller (daughter of Arthur Miller), Janna Malamud Smith (daughter of Bernard Malamud), Adam Bellow (son of Saul Bellow), Joe Hill (son of Stephen King), Rebecca Walker (daughter of Alice Walker), John Buffalo Mailer (son of Norman Mailer) and Aviva Chomsky (daughter of Noam Chomsky).

Besides being a journalist, Alessandra Farkas is also a blogger. Her blog Route 66 appears on the website of Corriere della Sera, focusing upon some of the lesser-known aspects of American society. For the last three years she has written a monthly column for Shalom, the oldest and most widely circulated periodical of the Italian Jewish community.

== Works ==
She has been interviewed on numerous occasions by Italian and American media including the Charlie Rose show, CNN and the bilingual magazine i-Italy. In 2006, she published her first book Pranzo di Famiglia (Lunch with the Family) which tells the story of her family, founders of one of the largest and most influential publishers of the Austro-Hungarian Empire.

In December 2014, she was awarded "The Amerigo Special Prize", given for the best coverage of America by an Italian journalist.

In May 2015 "La Lettura" ebook published her extended essay "Cosa resta della Letteratura", based upon her interviews over the past two decades with Harold Bloom, the noted American literary critic.
