= Joseph Baylee =

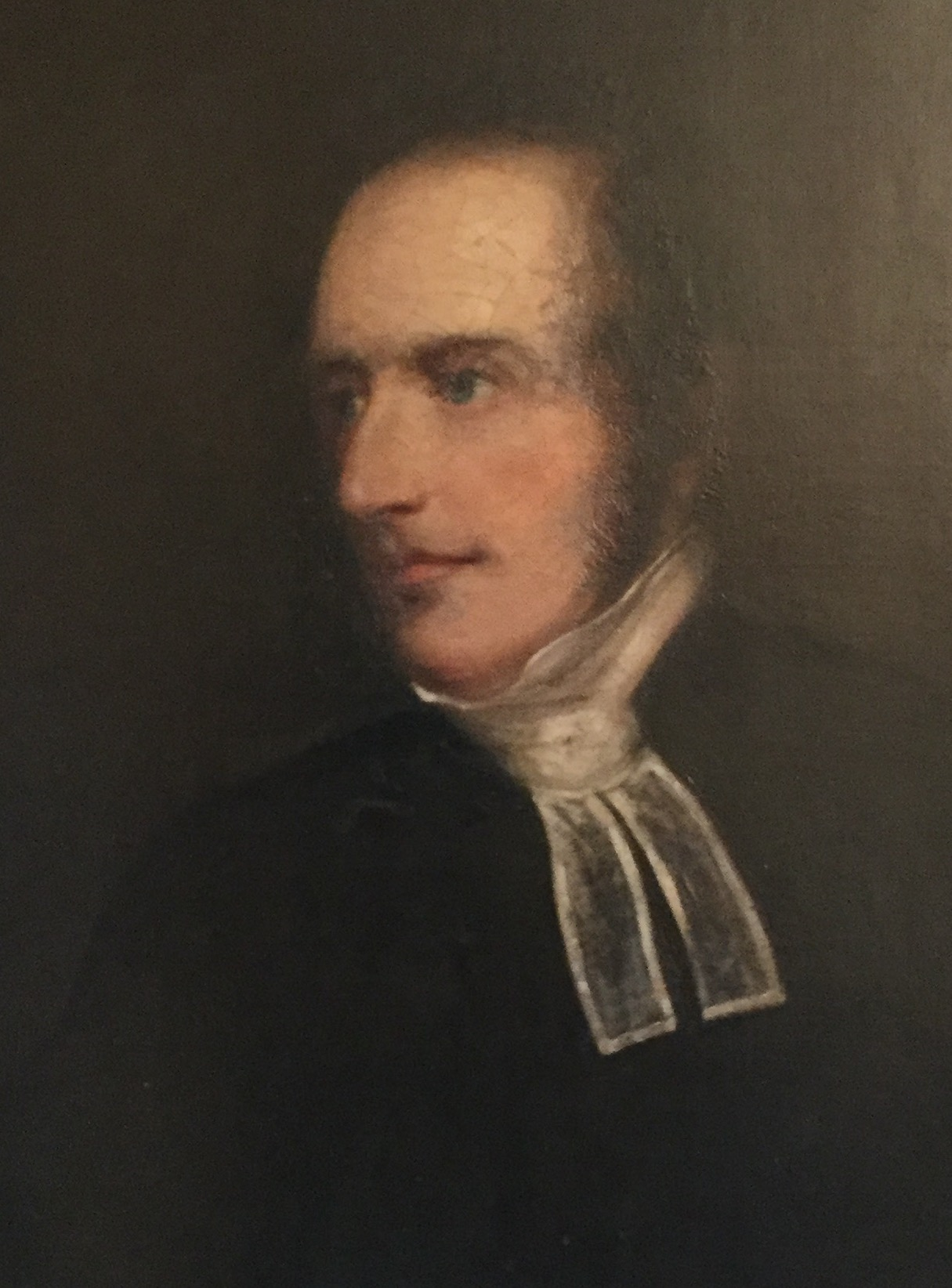
Rev. Joseph Tyrrell Baylee 1807-1883

Joseph Tyrrell Baylee, D.D. (1807–1883), was a theological writer. Baylee received his education at Trinity College Dublin (B.A. 1834, M.A. 1848, B.D. and D.D. 1852). To the residents of Liverpool and Birkenhead his name became for a quarter of a century a household word, on account of his activity as the founder and first principal of St. Aidan's Theological College, Birkenhead, where he prepared many students for the work of the ministry. This institution, which may be said to have been founded in 1846, originated in a private theological class conducted by Dr. Baylee, under the sanction of the Bishop of Chester, Dr. Sumner, afterwards advanced to the see of Canterbury.

Dr. Baylee's successful exertions changed it into a public institution, and led to the construction of the present college building, which was opened in 1856. At one time Dr. Baylee was well known as a champion of the evangelical party, and especially for his theological discussions with members of the Roman Catholic church. Accounts were published of his controversies with Thomas Joseph Brown, bishop of Apollonia (afterwards of Newport and Menevia), on the infallibility of the church of Rome (1852), with Matthew Bridges on Protestantism v.. Catholicism (1856), and with Edward Miall, M.P., on Church establishments.

In 1871 Dr. Baylee was presented to the vicarage of Sheepscombe, Gloucestershire, where he died 7 July 1883.

== Family ==
Joseph was born on 23 July 1807 in Limerick, the son of Jane née Luccock (1778―1858) and John Tyrrell Baylee (1778―1848).

He married first, in 1832, Matilda Collis (1799―1864), by whom he had two children:

+ Rev Joseph Tyrrell Baylee (1833―1896)

+ Matilda Baylee (1838―1869)

In 1872 he married secondly Jane née Tee (1818―1890) widow of Henry Jackson (1802―1867) and mother of Admiral Henry Bradwardine Jackson.

== Works ==
- The Institutions of the Church of England are of Divine Origin, 3rd edit. Dublin, 1838.
- Principles of Scripture Interpretation, derived in the quotations from the New Testament in the Old, an essay, privately printed, London, 1844, 12mo.
- The Infallibility of the Church of Rome, 1851.
- Unitarianism a Rejection of the Word of God, 1852.
- The Mysteries of the Kingdom; a series of Sketches expository of Our Blessed Saviour's Parables, 1852.
- The Kingdoms of Europe in The Signs of the Times: . . . Six Lectures, 1854.
- Protestantism us. Roman Catholicism, 1856.
- Genesis and Geology; the Holy Word of God defended from its Assailants, 1857.
- Christ on Earth: from the Supper at Bethany to his Ascension into Glory, 1863.
- The Intermediate State of the Blessed Dead, 1864.
- Church Establishments, 1864.
- God, Man, and the Bible, 1867.
- A Pastor's Last Words, six sermons, 1869.
- Verbal Inspiration the True Characteristic of God's Holy Word, 1870.
- Introduction to the Study of the Bible, 2nd edit. 3 vols., 1870.
- The Times of the Gentiles: being the 2520 years from the 1st year of Nebuchadnezzar, B.C. 623, to the 1260th year of the Mohammedan Treading down of Jerusalem, A.D. 1896, London, 1871.
- The Apocalypse, with an Exegetical Commentary, 1876.
