= Arthur Tait =

Arthur James Tait (8 November 1872 – 3 April 1944) was an eminent Anglican priest and author.

Tait was educated at St Lawrence College, Ramsgate; Merchant Taylors' School, London; St John's College, Cambridge and Ridley Hall, Cambridge. After a curacy at Holy Trinity Church, Eastbourne he was Principal of St Aidan's College, Birkenhead from 1901 until 1907; and then of Ridley Hall, Cambridge from 1908 to 1927. He was a Canon Residentiary of Peterborough from 1924 until his death.

His father in law was The Rt Rev. Thomas Wortley Drury, D.D. His daughter Margaret married the university administrator Bertrand Hallward.
