= Maxwell Dunlop (priest) =

Maxwell Tulloch Dunlop (15 December 1898 – 2 October 1964) was a senior Church of England priest. He was Archdeacon of Aston from 1955 to 1964.

Born on 15 December 1898, he was educated at Ruthin School, Leeds Grammar School, Hertford College, Oxford and Ripon College Cuddesdon. He was ordained in 1926 and began his career as a Curate at Holy Trinity, Southport. After this he was a Lecturer in History at Culham Training College before returning to Cuddesdon as a Senior Tutor. From 1935 to 1938 he was Vicar of West Hendred. After this he was Director of Social Studies at the Mansfield University Settlement (1938–39); Director of Northumberland and Tyneside Council of Social Service (1939–48) and then Director of Religious Education for the University of Manchester (1948–55).

He died on 2 October 1964.

Church of England titles
| Preceded by Michael Parker | Archdeacon of Aston; 1912–1913 | Succeeded by Francis Warman |
