= Alister Warman =

Alister Seager Warman (9 December 1946 – 29 May 2020) was a British curator and art school principal. He was the last principal of the Byam Shaw School of Art from 1991 until its amalgamation with Central Saint Martins in 2003.

== Early life and education ==
The son of Mark Warman, a classics master at Harrow, he and his two brothers attended the school. He studied at the Courtauld Institute.

== Career ==
Following a spell teaching English in Rome, he joined Newcastle Polytechnic as a lecturer in 1971, then worked at the Arts Council from 1976 until his appointment as the first 'director' of the Serpentine Gallery in 1983. His final post, as head of the Byam Shaw School, was a 'suitable climax' to his career.
