= Moritz Wahrmann =

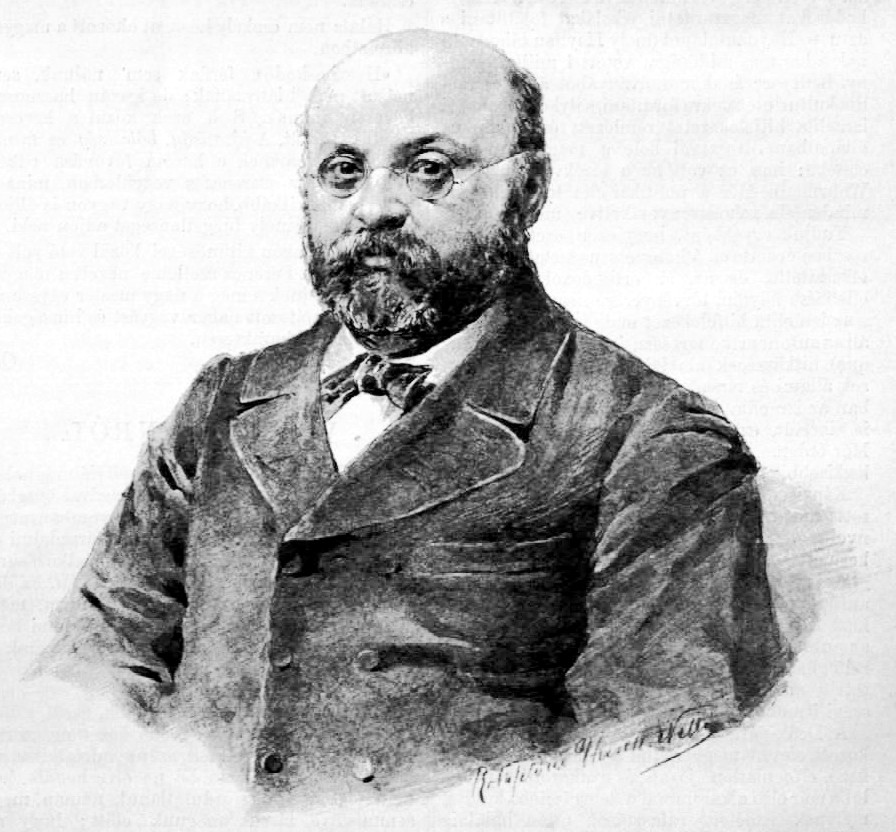
Moritz Wahrmann.

Moritz Wahrmann, Wahrmann Mór(ic) (28 February 1832 in Budapest – 26 November 1892 in Budapest) was a Hungarian politician; grandson of Israel Wahrmann. He was educated at the Protestant gymnasium and the university of his native city, and entered his father's mercantile establishment in 1847, becoming its head after his father's death.

Wahrmann was closely associated with the development of Hungarian commerce and industry, the consolidation of the Hungarian finances, the growth of the educational and philanthropic institutions of Budapest, and preeminently with the progress of its Jewish community. Aiming to nationalize Hungarian commerce and to render his country independent of Austria, both financially and economically, he established large industrial and commercial enterprises.

In 1869 Wahrmann was elected to the Hungarian Parliament as the representative of the electoral district of the Leopoldstadt (at present the fifth district of Budapest), being the first Jew to be chosen a member of the Hungarian delegation, in which he energetically promoted the interests of Hungary. He was reelected six times, holding the office until his death. He spoke comparatively seldom, but was an active member of committees, in which his financial training frequently rendered him one of the most important figures. He was also president of the Chamber of Commerce and Industry of Budapest, and of the Lloyd Company.

Wahrmann was equally active in communal affairs, and was one of the foremost advocates of his coreligionists. He was a most zealous member of the Magyar Izraelita Egylet, and strove with tongue and pen for the emancipation of the Jews. In 1868 he was vice-president of the General Jewish Congress, and in this capacity headed a deputation to the king. As president of the community of Budapest he exercised a profound influence on its administration and institutions, and labored to establish unity of interest among the various political bodies. He also contributed generously from his ample means to scientific, educational, and philanthropic institutions.

His brother, Alexander Wahrmann (born 1839; died at Budapest in 1899), contributed much, together with Max Wirth, the Viennese political economist, toward the economic elevation of Hungary. He was especially noteworthy as a philanthropist, bequeathing 200,000 crowns to the benevolent societies of the capital, and 600,000 crowns for the erection of a Jewish gymnasium.
