= William Greer (bishop) =

William Derrick Lindsay Greer (28 February 1902 – 30 October 1972) was an Anglican Bishop for over 20 years in the middle of the 20th century. Greer was from the Irish Greer family from Rhone Hill, the son of Richard Ussher Greer, Rector of Seapatrick and grandson of the Reverend William Henry Greer of Rhone Hill. He was born on 28 February 1902 and was educated at Saint Columba's College, Dublin and Trinity College, Dublin. After a spell as Assistant Principal, Ministry of Home Affairs, Northern Ireland he was ordained in 1929. Curate then Vicar of St Luke's Church, Newcastle upon Tyne, he was then successively Secretary of the SCM, Principal of Westcott House Cambridge and Bishop of Manchester. He died on 30 October 1972.

Trinity C.E. High School, a state comprehensive High school and technology college in Manchester, was formed in 1984 by a merger of Bishop Greer and Fallowfield schools. Bishop Greer High School was in Gorton.

== Notes ==
Church of England titles
Preceded by Guy Warman	Bishop of Manchester; 1947–1970	Succeeded by Patrick Rodger
