= Theodore Wolfner =

Hungarian politician

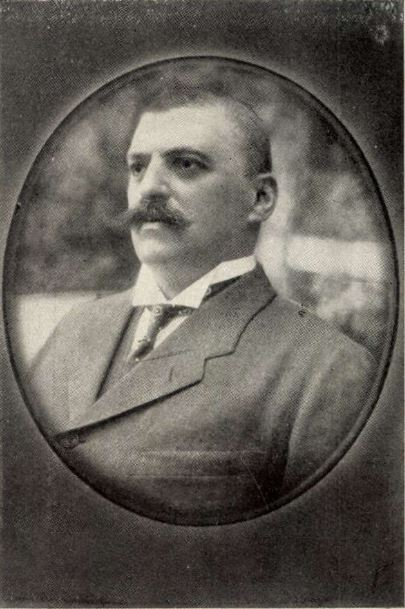
Theodore Wolfner

Theodore Wolfner (18 June 1864 Újpest – 18 May 1929, Budapest) was a Hungarian deputy. He was educated at the gymnasium and at the school of technology in Budapest. After spending some time in his father's tannery in order to acquire a practical knowledge of the manufacture of leather, he undertook an extensive tour, visiting Germany, Egypt, Palestine, and Turkey.

Wolfner was an alderman of Újpest, a member of the county council of Pest, president of the national association of leather manufacturers, director of the technological industrial museum, and a member of the chamber of commerce and industry in Budapest. From 1896 he represented Gödöllő in the Hungarian Parliament, a fact which is the more noteworthy because of the circumstance that this district was the favorite residence of Francis Joseph I, and was under the influence of court officials.

In 1904 Wolfner was the recipient of a rare honour, when the king appointed him a Captain of Hussars in the reserves and elevated him to the Hungarian nobility.

Baron Theodore Wolfner died on May 18, 1929, at the age of 65.

Wolfner married Maria Margit Gitta (1872-1940?); their children were Johann János Wolfner (1894-1944), Veronika Henrietta Dirsztay (b. 1896), Lilly Andrea Halmy (b. 1897), and András Pál Wolfner (1898-1945). The Wolfners were a Jewish family; Johann and András were both murdered in the Holocaust.
