= Percy Stevens =

The Rt. Rev. Percy Stevens was a missionary of the Anglican Church.
Born on 21 May 1882 and educated at Winchester House, Bristol and St Aidan's Theological College, Birkenhead, he was ordained in 1907 and began his ecclesiastical career as a Curate at St Jude's, Plymouth. For many years a CMS Missionary in Kwangsi-Hunan he was Bishop of that area from 1933 to 1949.
He died on 7 July 1966
