= Steven Mansbach =

American historian (born 1950)

Steven Mansbach (born 1950) is an American historian, currently a Distinguished University Professor in History of 20th-century art at University of Maryland. He is also the Founding Dean and Director of the American Academy in Berlin.
