= Lajos Pósa (writer) =

Hungarian writer and poet

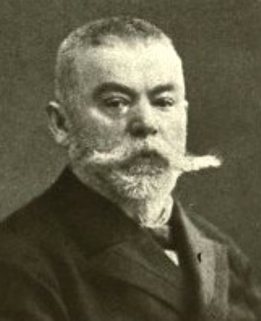
Lajos Pósa

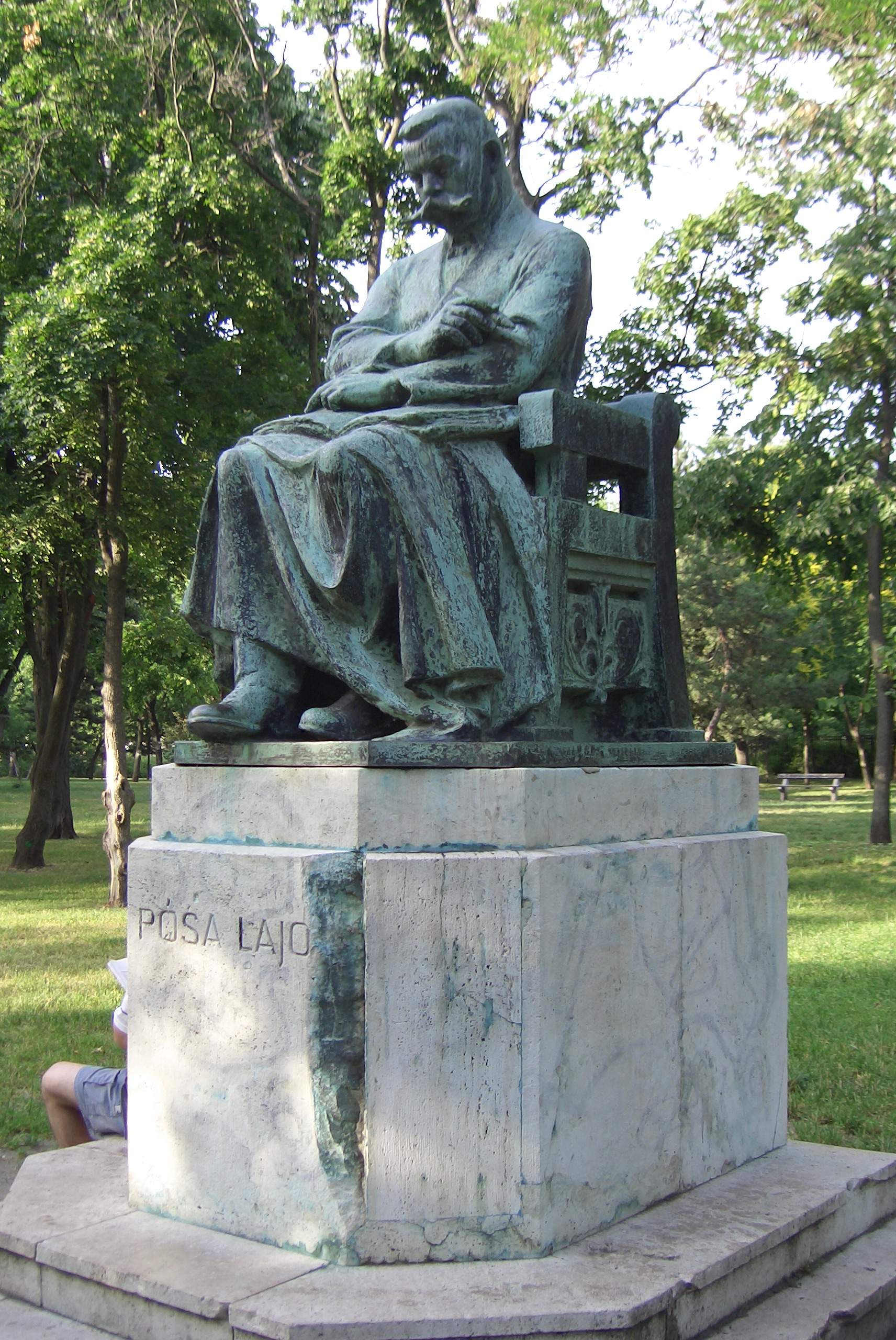
His statue in City Park Budapest

Lajos Pósa (9 April 1850 – 9 July 1914) was a Hungarian writer and poet. Alongside Elek Benedek, he created and edited a children's literary journal, Az Én Újságom ("My Newspaper").
