= Donald Tytler (bishop) =

Donald Alexander Tytler (2 May 1925 – 1992) was the 8th Bishop of Middleton.

A noted liberal, he was born in 1925 and educated at Eastbourne College and Christ's College, Cambridge; theological training at Ridley Hall, Cambridge. Ordained in 1949 to assistant curacy in Yardley, Birmingham; SCM Chaplain, University of Birmingham, 1952; Precentor at Birmingham Cathedral, 1955; Diocescan Director of Education within the Diocese of Birmingham, 1957; Vicar of St Mark, Londonderry, and Rural dean of Warley, 1963; Canon Residentiary, Birmingham Cathedral, 1972; and Archdeacon of Aston, 1977; Suffragan Bishop of Middleton, 1982, held until his death in 1992.

== Notes ==
Church of England titles
Preceded by Edward Ralph Wickham	Bishop of Middleton; 1982 – 1992	Succeeded by Stephen Squires Venner
