= Archdeacon of Aston =

Church of England ecclesiastical office

The Archdeacon of Aston is a senior ecclesiastical officer within the Diocese of Birmingham.

The Archdeacon is responsible for the disciplinary supervision of the clergy within the archdeaconry's three deaneries: Aston and Sutton Coldfield, Coleshill and Polesworth, and Yardley and Solihull.

The post was created from the Archdeaconry of Birmingham by Order-in-Council on 23 October 1906 and is currently held by Phelim O'Hare, who was collated at Aston Parish Church on 14 July 2024.

== List of archdeacons ==
- 1906–1912 (res.): Mansfield Owen
- 1912–1913 (res.): Walter Hobhouse
- 1913–1920 (res.): George Gardner
- 1920–1938 (res.): Harold Richards
- 1938–1946 (res.): Henry McGowan (afterwards Bishop of Wakefield)
- 1946–1954 (res.): Michael Parker (afterwards Bishop suffragan of Aston)
- 1954–1955: vacant
- 1955–2 October 1964 (d.): Maxwell Dunlop
- 1965–1977 (ret.): Francis Warman (afterward archdeacon emeritus)
- 1977–1982 (res.): Donald Tytler (afterwards Bishop suffragan of Middleton)
- 1982–1990 (res.): John Cooper
- 1990–2003 (ret.): John Barton (afterward archdeacon emeritus)
- 2005–25 January 2014 (res.): Brian Russell
- 16 November 2014 – 30 September 2022 (res.): Simon Heathfield
- 14 July 2024 – present: Phelim O'Hare
