= Israel ben Solomon Wahrmann =

Hungarian rabbi (1755–1824)

Israel ben Solomon Wahrmann was the first officially recognized rabbi of Pest, Hungary.

== Biography ==
Wahrmann was born at Óbuda (year unknown). In 1799 he was called to the rabbinate of Pest, and was the first officially recognized rabbi of the community, which developed rapidly under his leadership. His insistence in the matter prompted the drafting of the community's first statutes. The most important institution connected with his name is the Nationalschule, an elementary school dedicated on 8 September 1814, which was an important factor in raising the intellectual status of the community, its curriculum including Hungarian, modern science, and Hebrew. Wahrmann published only one sermon, in German and entitled Andachtsübung der Israeliten der Königlichen Freistadt Pesth.

Wahrman died in Budapest on 24 June, 1824. The sorrow at his death found expression in Philip Weil's Hebrew and German poem Evel Yisrael, oder Totenfeier.
