= Georgina Kinnear =

Kinnear, Georgina (1826/1828–1914), headmistress

- Born: 1820; Edinburgh, Scotland
- Died: 26 April 1914 (aged 93–94); Edinburgh, Scotland
- Education: self-taught

Georgina Kinnear (1820 – 26 April 1914) was a British headmistress.

== Life ==
Kinnear was born in Edinburgh in 1820. Her brothers were educated by tutors, but Kinnear taught herself, getting up at 5 am each morning to do so. She was able to poach some language teaching from her brother's tutors. She was the daughter of John Gardner Kinnear FRSE, a businessman and founder of John G. Kinnear & Co, commission merchants based at 17 St Vincent Place in the city centre. The family lived at 137 Clarence Place in Glasgow. Her younger brother became Alexander Kinnear, 1st Baron Kinnear and her uncle was James Kinnear FRSE (1810–1849). All were descended from the Edinburgh banking firm of Thomas Kinnear and Sons.

Kinnear traveled abroad and increased her knowledge of French and German. In 1860 she was employed by the British minister Lord and Lady Ann Napier to educate their children at their home in the Netherlands. The minister family moved to Russia in 1861 and there she taught herself Russian so well that she was able to take a job with a Russian family.

Kinnear became the head of the Park School for Girls in Glasgow in 1880. The school was a new one opened by the Glasgow Girls School Company which had been formed by local businessmen the year before. Despite being largely self-taught Kinnear came with glowing recommendations from the schools she had worked at previously. Kinnear was allowed to develop the school as she saw fit. She was shocked by the complacency of others about the lack of education for girls.

When she retired, she was replaced by Margaret Paulin Young who had been a founding pupil of the Park School. She had been head girl and was later groomed by Kinnear to take on the post. Kinnear had sent her to be the founding head of St Columba's School, Kilmacolm which was a clone of Park School opened by the same company in 1897. Kinnear, Young and Young's replacement are credited with forming St Columba's school which is still an independent, but co-educational, school in 2019.

Kinnear died in Edinburgh in 1914 after spending some time speaking mostly in Russian.

== See also ==
- "Variety without Disorder A History of St Columba’s 1897-1997" by Susan Milligan
