= Alexander Kinnear, 1st Baron Kinnear =

Scottish advocate and judge

Alexander Kinnear
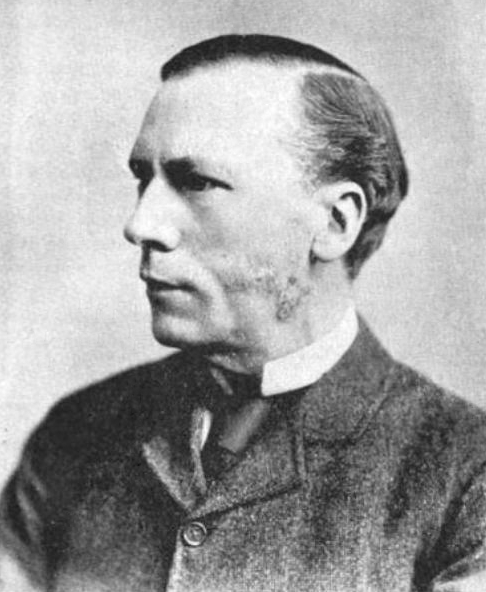
- Born: Alexander Smith Kinnear; 3 November 1833; Edinburgh, Scotland
- Died: 20 December 1917 (aged 84); Edinburgh, Scotland
- Burial place: Dean Cemetery
- Education: University of Glasgow; University of Edinburgh
- Occupation(s): Advocate, judge

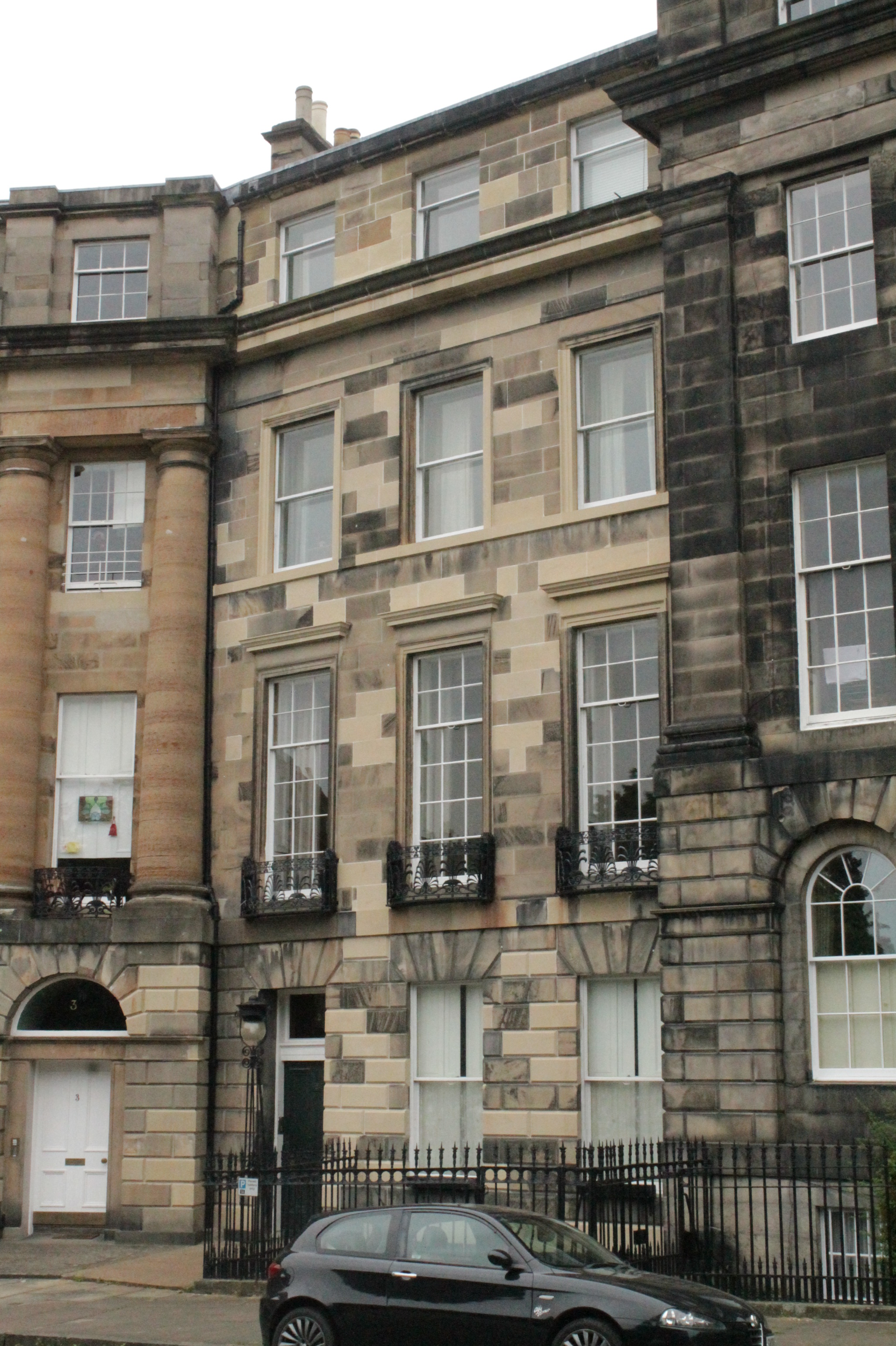
2 Moray Place, Edinburgh

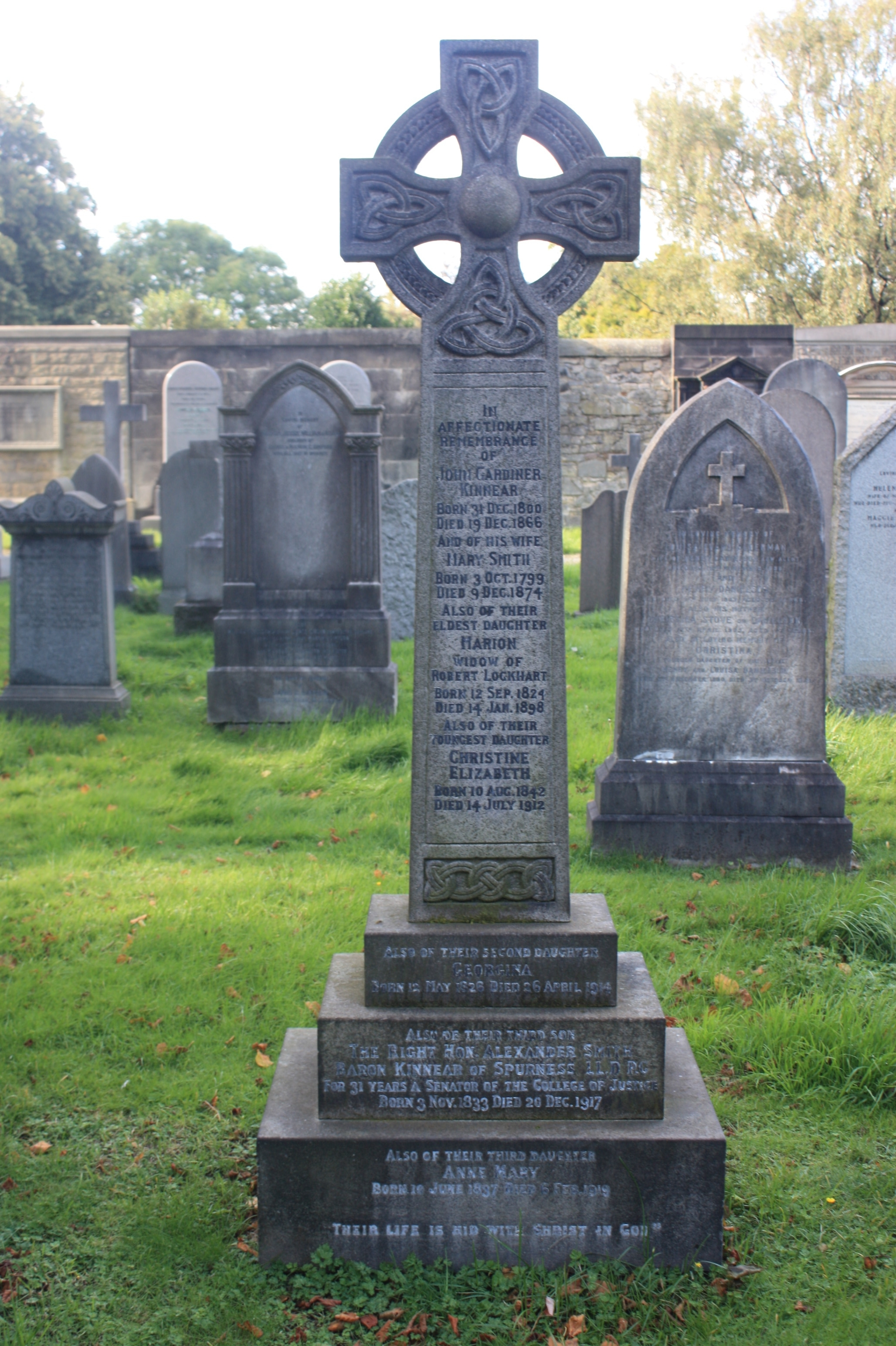
Baron Kinnear's grave, Dean Cemetery

Alexander Smith Kinnear, 1st Baron Kinnear, PC, FRSE (3 November 1833 – 20 December 1917) was a Scottish advocate and judge. He served as Lord of Council and Session (1882–1913), and was appointed to the Privy Council in 1911.

== Life ==
He was born in Edinburgh, the son of John Gardiner Kinnear FRSE, a businessman and founder of John G. Kinnear & Co, commission merchants based at 17 St Vincent Place in the city centre. The family lived at 137 Clarence Place in Glasgow. His eldest sister became the headmistress Georgina Kinnear, and his uncle was James Kinnear FRSE (1810–1849). All were descended from the Edinburgh banking firm of Thomas Kinnear and Sons.

He was educated at Glasgow and Edinburgh universities, and was called to the Scottish bar in 1856. For some years he acted as a law reporter, but in 1878 he was chosen leading counsel in the Court of Session for the liquidators in the case arising out of the failure of the City of Glasgow Bank, and henceforward his rise was rapid. In 1881 he became a Q.C., and the same year was chosen Dean of the Faculty of Advocates. In 1882 he was made a judge, with the courtesy title of Lord Kinnear, and in 1890 an appellate judge, retiring from the Court of Session in 1913, although he continued to sit in the House of Lords as a lord of appeal. He was a member of the commission of 1904 for settling the question of the division of Scottish church property.

In 1883 he was elected a Fellow of the Royal Society of Edinburgh. His proposers were James Moncrieff, Lord Moncrieff, Alexander Crum Brown, Peter Guthrie Tait, and Alexander Forbes Irvine. He was awarded honorary doctorates (LLD) from the University of Edinburgh in 1878 and the University of Glasgow in 1894.

He lived at 2 Moray Place, a huge townhouse on the exclusive Moray Estate on the western fringe of Edinburgh's New Town.

== Baron Kinnear ==
Baron Kinnear, of Spurness in the County of Orkney, was a title in the Peerage of the United Kingdom. It was created on 5 February 1897 for Alexander Kinnear, Lord Kinnear in recognition of his services as chairman of the Scottish Universities Commission of 1889. He did not marry, and the title became extinct on his death on in Edinburgh 20 December 1917.

He is buried with other family members in a relatively commonplace grave in Dean Cemetery in Edinburgh on the central path within the north section of the original cemetery.

Peerage of the United Kingdom
| New creation | Baron Kinnear; 1897–1917 | Extinct |
