= Girlguiding Scotland =

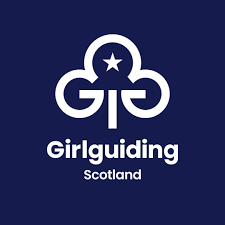
- Official Girlguiding Scotland logo (2023)
- Headquarters: Girlguiding Scotland Headquarters
- Location: Edinburgh
- Country: Scotland
- Founders: Robert Baden-Powell, Olave Baden-Powell, Agnes Baden-Powell
- Membership: 49000 (Active)
- Scottish Chief Commissioner: Elaine Rough
- Deputy Scottish Chief Commissioner: Sarah MacNeil
- Website www.girlguidingscotland.org.uk

Girlguiding Scotland is part of the worldwide Guiding movement. It is the country's largest voluntary organisation for girls and young women with 61,375 members in 3,500 units throughout Scotland.

== History ==
The Boy Scouting Movement was first founded by Lord Robert Baden-Powell in 1907, and after seeing that girls and young women were joining scouts, and overwhelming appeals from these girls, his sister Agnes Baden-Powell was given the job of founding the Girl Guide Movement.

One of these girls who became scouts, and who is recognised as Scotland's first Girl Guide, is Allison Hope Greenlees (Then, Allison Hope Cargill) at Laurel Bank School. She started the Cuckoo Patrol, after reading an edition of Scouting for Boys and wanted something like the Boy Scouts to be available to girls. The Cuckoo Patrol was the first Patrol of Girl Scouts in Scotland, and was formed in Glasgow in 1908 with links to the 1st Glasgow Scout Patrol; similar patrols were being set up all over the UK. This led to a more specific demand for "something for the girls" at the Crystal Palace Rally in 1910, despite work already in place to bring these changes around. Allison Cargill now has a Girlguiding House named after her, which is maintained by Girlguiding East Lothian County.

The first registered Girl Guides in Scotland were the 1st Peebles Patrol, formed in 1910, and founded by Lady Erskine. The first meeting was held on 26 February 1910 at Venlaw Castle, Tweeddale. The Girl Guides were officially launched in the same year by Baden-Powell's sister Agnes Baden-Powell, and Imperial Headquarters established. A Scottish Headquarters Committee was formed in 1912 and the Girl Guide movement established in Scotland. The Girl Guides Association for Scotland was established in 1933 with its own constitution.

== Administration ==
Girlguiding Scotland has active units in six regions that cover all of Scotland:

The six regions are further subdivided into a total of 38 geographical counties plus a 39th non-geographical county for Lone members. These in turn are divided into divisions; divisions may then be split into districts. Each district comprises a number of individual units covering all sections. How districts and divisions work together varies, depending on a number of factors: location, number of units and members, historic tradition and events and current leadership teams; and may change over time. Each area works towards delivering the best Guiding experience for their particular circumstances under overall guidance from Girlguiding Scotland and Girlguiding UK.

== Regions and counties ==
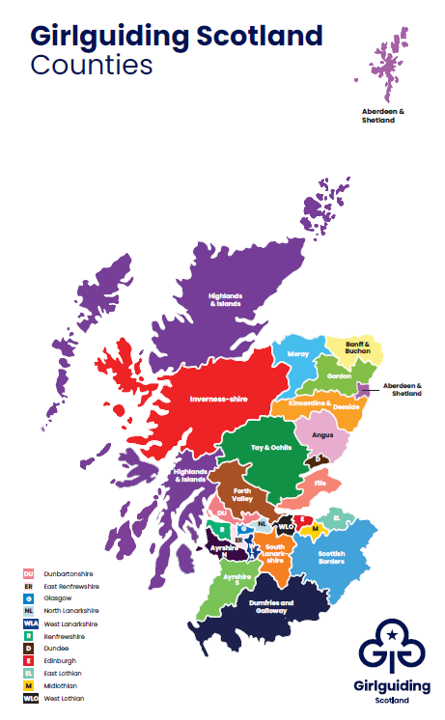
Map of Girlguiding Scotland Counties (as of 2023)

Arrangement of the counties into regions
Region	Counties
Lothian and Borders	Edinburgh, East Lothian, West Lothian, Midlothian, Roxburghshire, Tweed Valley, Berwickshire
Central	Fife, Forth Valley, Clackmannanshire, Angus, Perth & Kinross, Dundee
Strathclyde	City of Glasgow, Renfrewshire, East Renfrewshire, Dumbartonshire, North Lanarkshire, West Lanarkshire, South Lanarkshire
Highlands & Islands	Shetland, Orkney, Western Isles, Caithness, Sutherland, Ross-shire, Inverness-shire, Argyll
Grampian	Aberdeen, Kincardine & Deeside, Gordon, Banff & Buchan, Moray
Ayrshire & South West	Ayrshire North, Ayrshire South, Dumfries-shire, Stewartry of Kirkcudbright, Wigtownshire

The 39th County of Lones is not geographically located, as it provides support Scotland-wide and therefore sits separate from the regional structure. In all other ways it is identical to the other counties.

== Membership ==
The earlier membership badge features the Scottish thistle, one of the national emblems of Scotland

In 2016 the membership was over 60,000 members and registered volunteers, making up the largest voluntary organisation for girls and women in Scotland.

There were approximately 10,000 Rainbows, 22,000 Brownies, 14,000 Guides, 2000 Senior Section young women, and over 9,000 Adult members. About one in three eight-year-old girls in Scotland is a Brownie, and half the women born in Scotland have belonged to Girlguiding Scotland at some point in their lives.

The adult members give over 1 million hours in voluntary service each year, ranging from face to face time with young members through to attending and delivering training, accounts, record-keeping, membership support and planning. This is the equivalent of 550 full-time jobs.

Girlguiding Scotland is a charity and is funded by fundraising, grants, membership subscriptions and a trading arm.

Girlguiding Scotland Branded Logo (2010)

Girlguiding Scotland became independent in 1933 and in 1939 moved its headquarters to Coates Crescent, Edinburgh, where it remains today.

The Scottish Chief Commissioner is the most senior role in Girlguiding Scotland, who serves for a term of five years. Dinah Faulds became Scottish Chief Commissioner on 1 September 2007. She was succeeded by Sue Walker in 2012; and Dr Moira McKenna was appointed in 2017. The current Scottish Chief Commissioner is Elaine Rough who took over in 2022.

== Former location ==
Netherurd was Girlguiding Scotland's primary activity centre, where thousands on girls and young women held camps, and sleepovers; however it was sold in 2021. It was a Georgian mansion in the Scottish Borders, with 30 acres of grounds amid the Border Hills of Peeblesshire. It was given to the Girl Guides in the 1940s by Major Thomson. The centre included accommodation in the main house, the Garden House, a small number of new wigwam style cabins and five campsites. The centre offered a number of outdoor activity options including high and low ropes courses, water activities and archery; there were facilities to deliver training and indoor activities across the site.

== See also ==
- Girlguiding UK
- World Association of Girl Guides and Girl Scouts
