= George Terry =

George Terry may refer to:

- George Terry (musician) (born 1950), American guitarist
- Sir George Terry (police officer) (1921–1995), senior British police officer
- George Frederick Terry, Scottish Episcopalian clergyman

== See also ==
- Terry George (born 1952), Irish filmmaker
- Terry George (entrepreneur) (born 1965), British businessman
