= George Frederick Terry =

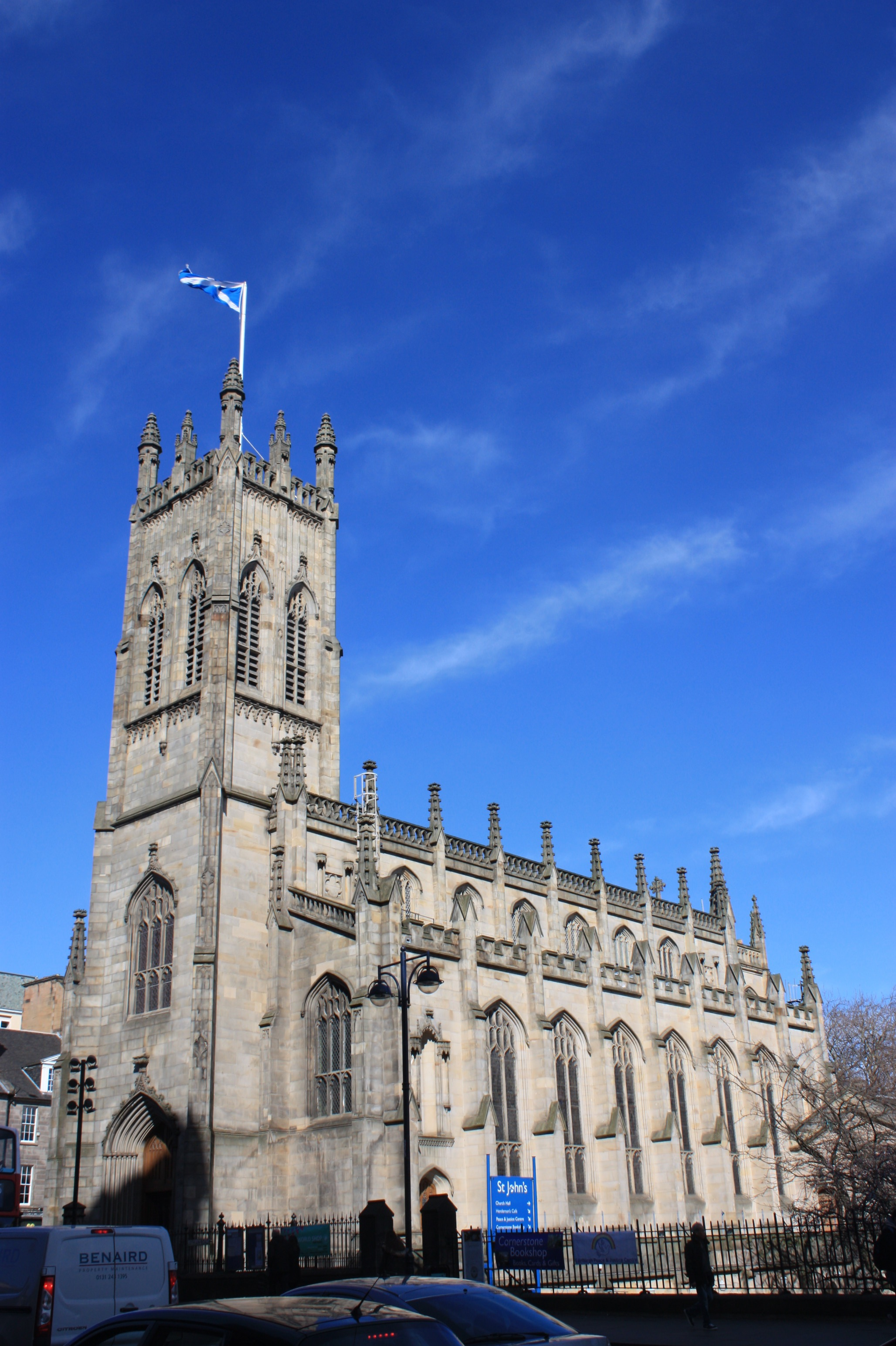
St John's in central Edinburgh

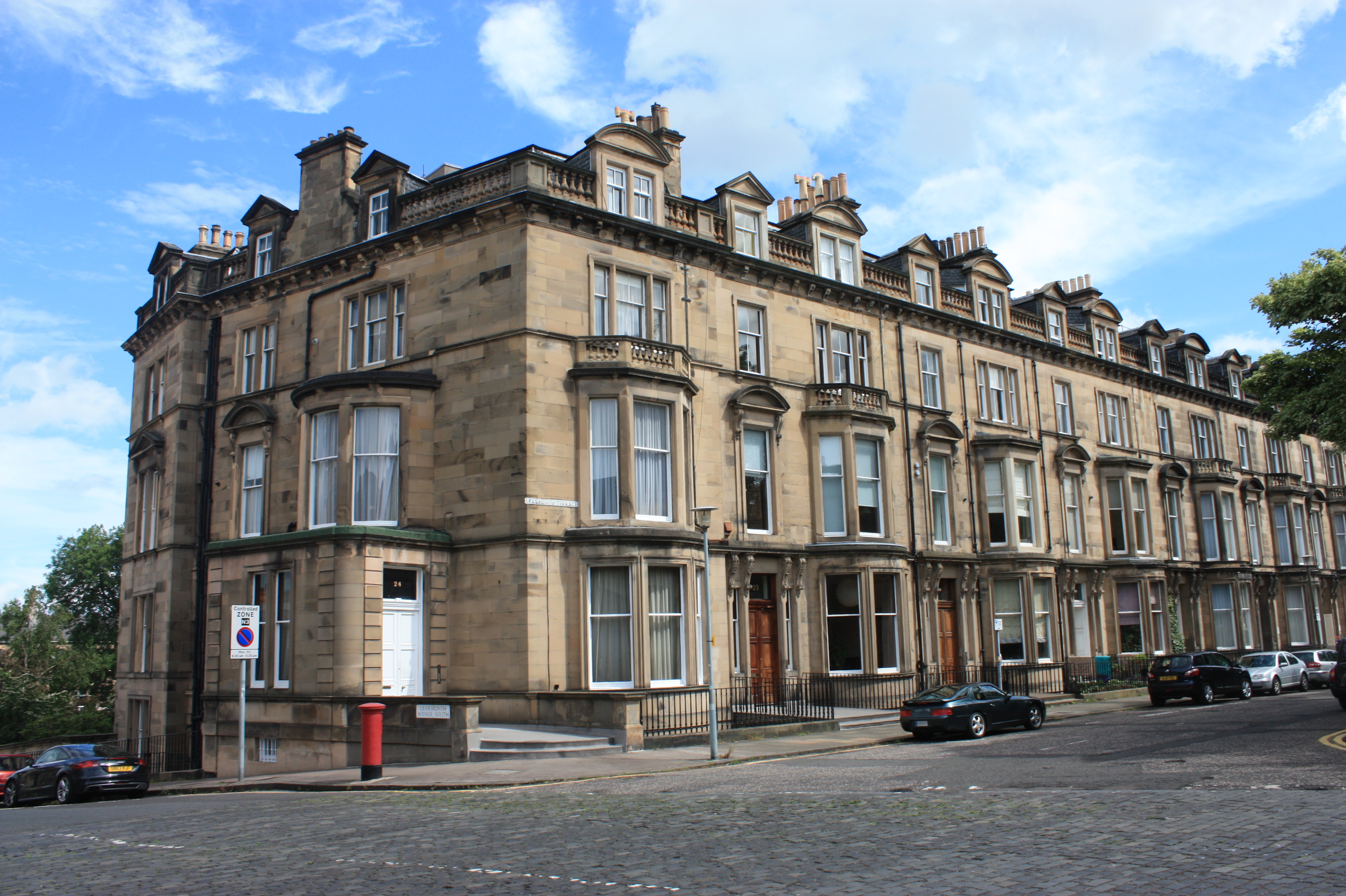
Learmonth Terrace, Edinburgh

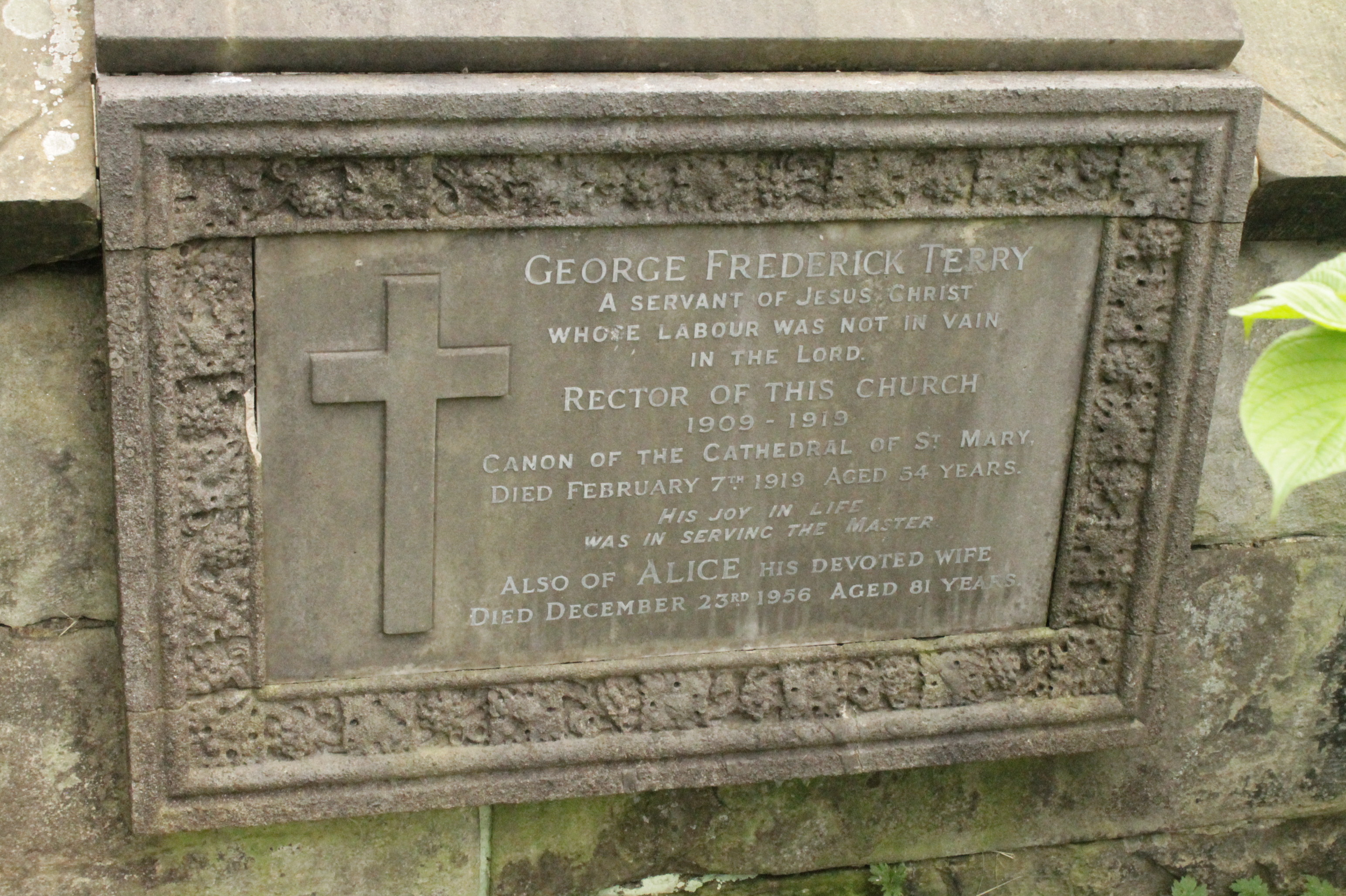
The grave of Rev George Frederick Terry, St John's, Edinburgh

George Frederick Terry (1864–1919) was a clergyman who served as Rector of St John's Church in Edinburgh, the principal church of the Scottish Episcopalian Church.

== Life ==
He was born in England in 1864.

He originally trained as an architect but then retrained for the clergy. He became a deacon in 1892 and priest in 1893.

He served as a curate at St Saviour's Church in Nottingham then served at St Peter's Church in Notting Hill in London. In 1901 he became vicar of All Souls Church in Hampstead.

In 1909 he succeeded Rev George James Cowley-Brown as Rector of St John's Church on Princes Street in central Edinburgh. He also served as Canon of St Mary's Episcopal Cathedral in Edinburgh. He lived at 10 Learmonth Terrace in the city's affluent West End.

In 1914 he became Edinburgh's first Scoutmaster

He died on 7 February 1919 due to the Spanish flu pandemic and was buried in the churchyard at St. John's in a terrace to the east of the church.

He was succeeded as Rector by Rev James Geoffrey Gordon.

== Family ==
He was married to Alice (1875-1956) who is buried with him. They had at least one son: John ("Jack") Terry (d.1953) who is buried with them.
