= Edward Ramsay =

Scottish Episcopal clergyman (1793–1872)

- Born: 1793
- Died: 1872 (aged 78–79)
- Occupations: Clergyman; author
- Known for: Dean of Edinburgh; works on Scottish history and biography

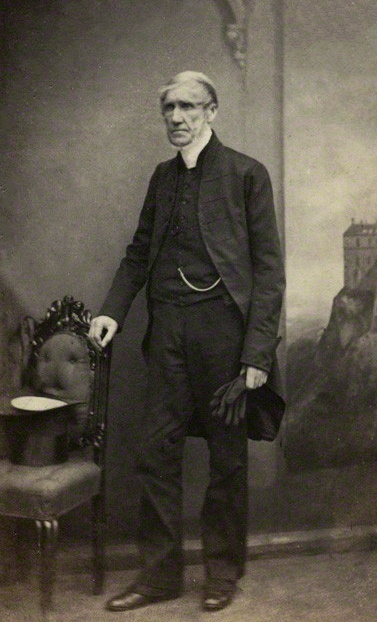
Ramsay in the early 1860s

Edward Bannerman Ramsay, FRSE (17 January 1793– 27 December 1872), usually referred to as Dean Ramsay, was a clergyman of the Scottish Episcopal Church, and Dean of Edinburgh in that communion from 1841, has a place in literature through his Reminiscences of Scottish Life and Character, which had gone through 22 editions at his death. It is a book full of the personality of the author, and preserves many traits and anecdotes.

== Life ==
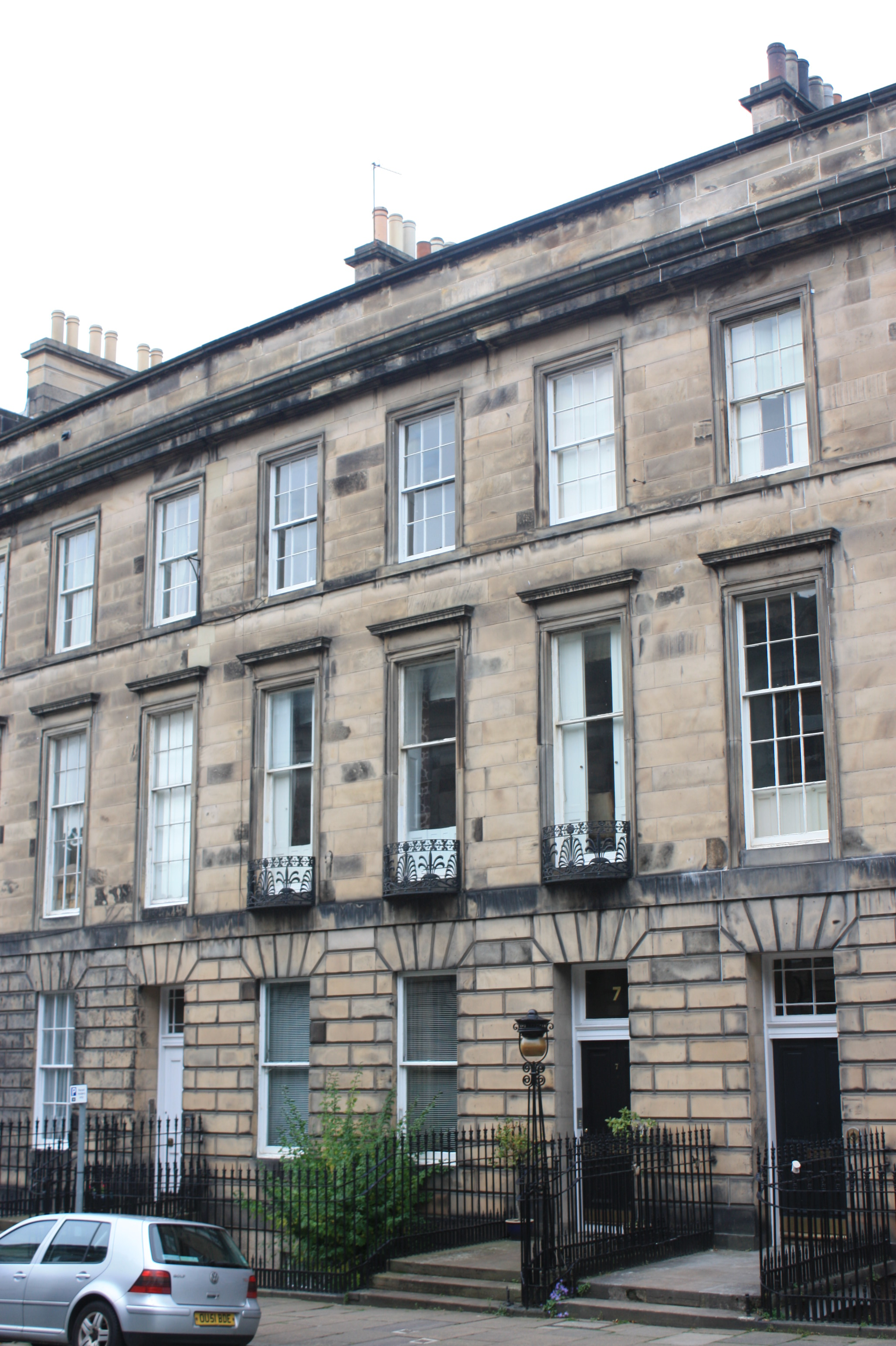
7 Darnaway Street, Edinburgh

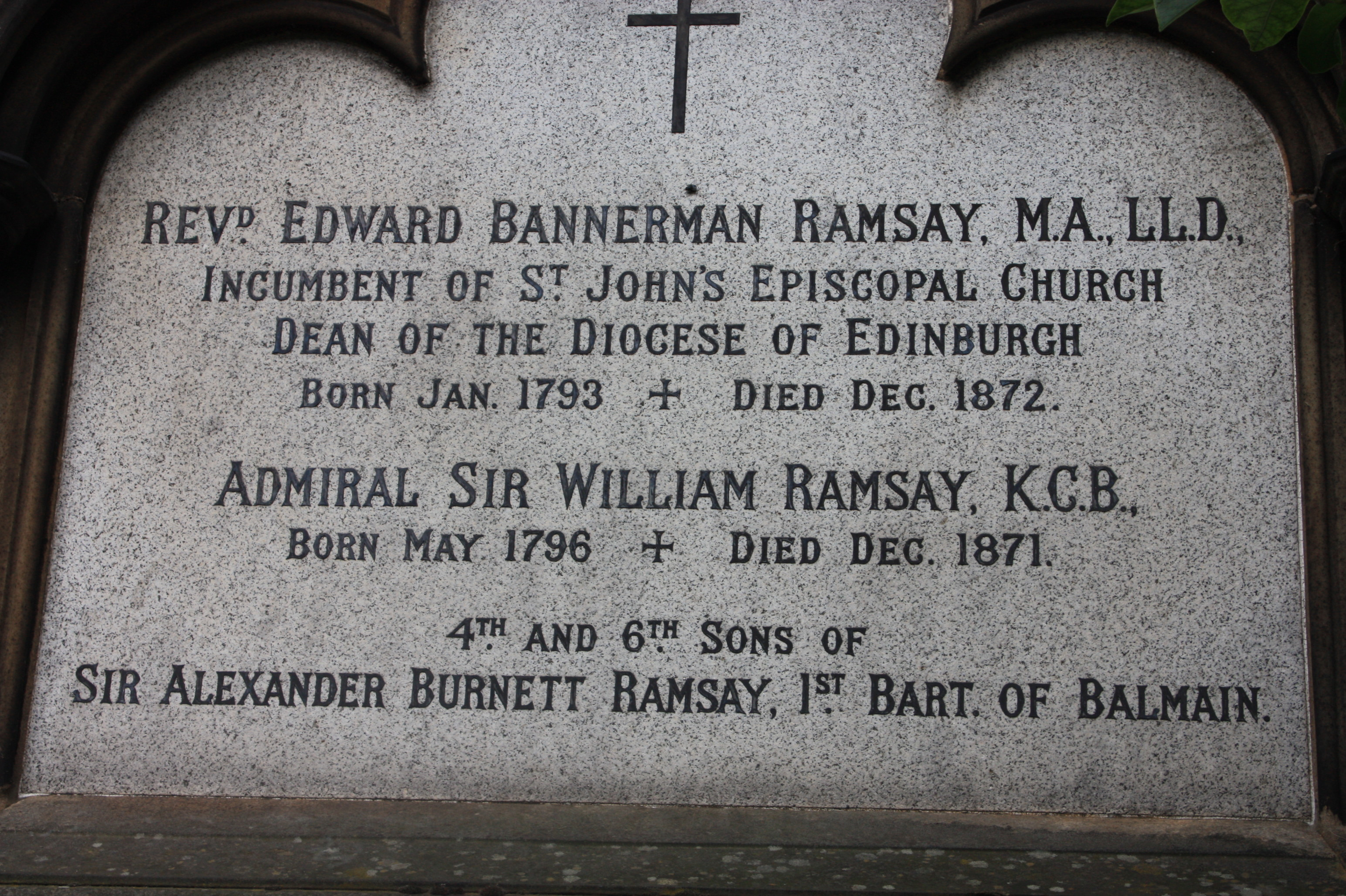
Dean Ramsay's grave, St John's

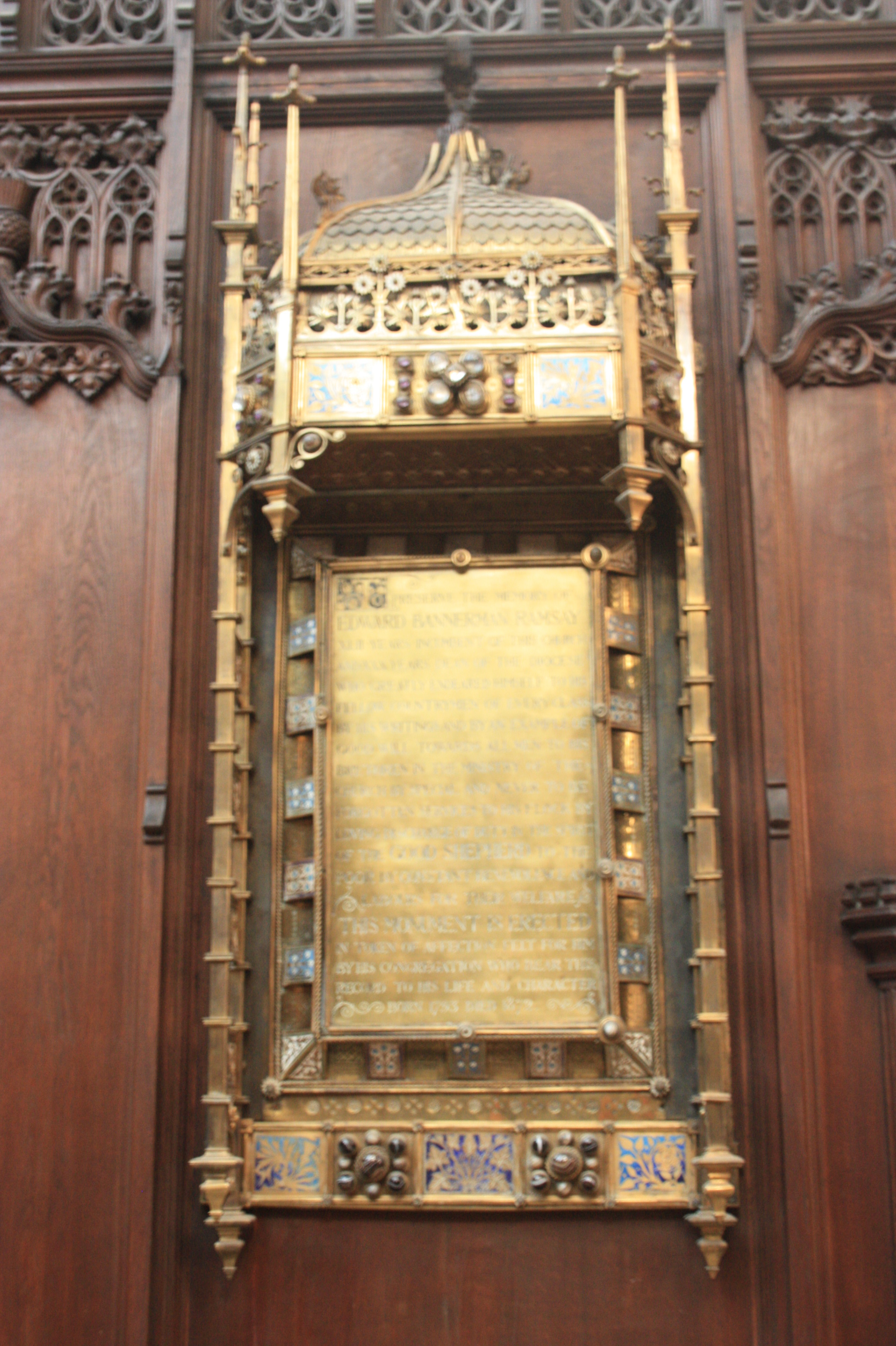
Memorial to Dean Ramsay, St John's, Edinburgh

Ramsay was born in Aberdeenshire on 31 January 1793, the fourth son of Elizabeth Bannerman and Sir Alexander Ramsay, Baronet of Balmain and Fasque.

He spent much of his early life in Yorkshire, attending the Cathedral Grammar School in Durham from 1806. He then attended St John's College at Cambridge University, graduating in 1815. He was then appointed curate of Rodden and of Buckland Dinham, Somerset. In 1824 he came to Edinburgh to serve as curate to St George's on York Place before being appointed minister of St John's Episcopal Church on Princes Street in 1830, where he then remained until death. This appointment followed the death of Bishop Daniel Sandford, founder of the church. His house from this period was a very large townhouse on the edge of the Moray Estate, 7 Darnaway Street, only five minutes walk from his church through Charlotte Square.

In 1838 he formed a new branch of the church, thereafter known as the Scottish Episcopal Church Society. In 1841 he was elected Dean of the Diocese of Edinburgh.

Over and above his religious activity he was elected a Fellow of the Royal Society of Edinburgh in 1827, his proposer being Sir David Brewster. He served as the Society's vice-president from 1859 to 1862.. He was the inaugural Honorary President of the Edinburgh Choral Union (later Edinburgh Royal Choral Union) from 1863 to 1865.

He was also one of the founders of Glenalmond College.

He died at 23 Ainslie Place on the Moray Estate in Edinburgh on 27 December 1872. His memorial service was led by Rt Rev Henry Cotterill. He was buried in the eastern enclosure attaching the church.

His public memorial, an imposing 7.3m high Celtic cross in Shap granite with bronze sculpted panels, is on Princes Street in the grounds of St John's, Edinburgh, facing Charlotte Street. It was designed by the architect Robert Rowand Anderson and built by Farmer & Brindley of London. The bronze panels are by F. A. Skidmore. It was erected in 1879.

== Legacy ==
The Episcopal Church still runs a charitable trust, The Dean Ramsay Fund, in his name.

== Publications ==
He co-wrote Reminiscences of Scottish Life and Character with his friend Cosmo Innes.

== Family ==
His brother was Admiral Sir William Ramsay KSB (1798-1871).

He married Isabella Cochrane, daughter of Thomas Cochrane, Speaker of the House of Representatives in Nova Scotia, in 1829. They had no children.

== Publications ==
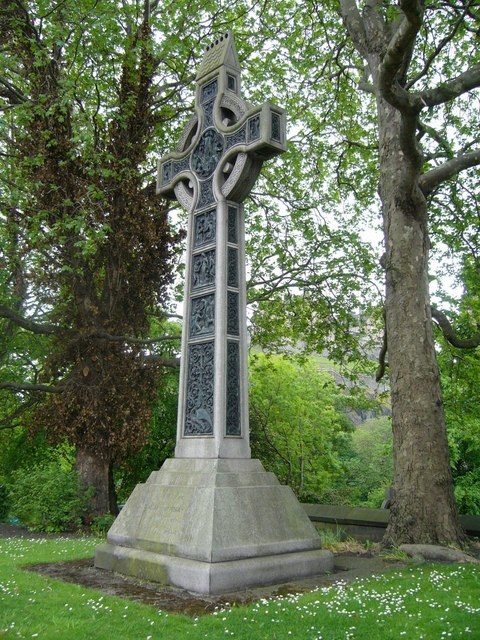
The Dean Ramsay Memorial on Princes Street

- A Catechism Compiled and Arranged for the Use of Young Persons (1835)
- The Christian's Almoner (1840)
- Reminiscences of Scottish Life and Character (1857)
