= Margaret Paulin Young =

Scottish educator (1864–1953)

- detail of 1929 portrait by James Gunn
- Born: 4 December 1864; Lilliesleaf
- Died: 15 January 1953 (aged 88); Hillhead
- Known for: leading the Park School in Glasgow

Margaret Paulin Young (4 December 1864 – 15 January 1953) was a Scottish educator. She attended and was later headmistress of the Park School for Girls in Glasgow, where she introduced classes on art and science.

== Early life ==
Young was born in Lilliesleaf in what is now the Scottish Borders. Her father, the Rev. William Langlands Young, was the United Presbyterian minister there, starting in 1857. Her mother was Margaret Brown Paulin. Author J. M. Barrie was a relative. Young was a founding pupil at the Park School in Glasgow in 1880, and became head girl. She trained as a teacher at the Training College for Teachers in Middle and Higher Schools for Girls in London.

== Career ==
Young taught classics at Oxford High School for Girls for two years, from 1884 to 1886, then returned to Park School. The school's headmistress, Georgina Kinnear, groomed Young as her successor, and appointed her headmistress at a new girls' school in Kilmacolm for further experience.

Young modernised the facilities at Park School, introducing school uniforms, dedicated classes in science and art, and a hockey program. It was said that she turned out to watch every match irrespective of rain or sun. The school had grown under her leadership. She retired in 1929 and she was presented with a portrait by James Gunn and a £500 prize fund was created. In retirement she was active in the Park School Students' Association, and president of the association for two years. The new head was Janie Robertson.

== Personal life ==
Young died at home in Hillhead in 1953, aged 88 years.
