= George Francis Brown =

British civil servant of the East India Company (1802–1871)

George Francis Brown (1802–1871) was a British civil servant of the East India Company, and Commissioner of Bhagalpur, Bihar at the time of the Santhal rebellion.

== Early life ==
He was the son of David Brown, and younger brother of Charles Philip Brown. His father, a chaplain in Bengal, died in 1812, and his mother Frances (née Cowley) then brought her family of eight children to London. In 1819 he was nominated for the East India College. Appointed as writer in 1820, he returned to India in November 1821, and was given posts at the assistant level, in the revenue and judicial systems, in 1823.

== Official ==
In 1826 Brown had an acting judicial position in Futtehpore, and in 1827 in Allahabad. In 1830 he became judge in Jaunpur, and in 1831 also Collector there. In 1834 he was consulted by John Low on the state of affairs in Awadh.

In 1835 Brown took 18 months furlough, in the Cape of Good Hope, for the sake of his health. In 1837 he was appointed Officiating (acting) Commissioner of Revenue at Bhagalpur (12th Circuit or Division). Also, that, he was appointed to Suheswan, but this was a post he never took up. His post at Bhagalpur was confirmed in 1854.

Brown raised funds for a Gothic church in Bhagalpur. He also helped set up a Christian mission there, with the Rev. Frederick William Vaux.

== Santal rebellion ==
The Santals settled in Damin-i-koh, a forested area. James Pontet had responsibility from 1837 for developing the area as a source of revenue. The Santals opposed other incomers, and the situation was disturbed in the mid-1850s by the building of a railway line. Santal leaders emerged, and led a rising.

The rebels moved on the town of Barhait, and gained an initial victory at Pirpainti, against British forces led by Major F. W. Burroughs, sent from Bhagalpur. Brown made proclamations, and declared martial law, though he was later found to have erred procedurally. He persisted with claims that the rebellion was being promoted by agitators, and argued his case with Frederick James Halliday. But Alfred Clarke Bidwell was appointed special commissioner for the suppression of the insurrection.

The rebels were defeated after fighting on a large scale, with thousands killed. Bidwell's report pointed a finger at Pontet, accused of failing to support the large number of Santal migrants to the area. The official view was that the local administration was at fault.

A separate Santal Pargana district was created in 1855, under George Yule. Yule became also Commissioner at Bhagalpur, with Ashley Eden as deputy.

== Later life and death ==
Brown retired from the East India Company service (retirement after 35 years of service became normal in 1854), and joined the Royal Institution in 1860. He died on 9 April 1871, and his will was proved in London.

== Family ==
Brown married in 1830 Catharine Jemima Gane, third daughter of James Gane; she died at Putney on 6 December 1863. Their children included:

- George James Cowley-Brown;
- Francis David Millet Brown VC;
- George Peploe Brown, Royal Artillery and artist (youngest son, died 1909), who married Harriette, daughter of William Wilberforce Bird;
- Hannah Maria(h) Brown who married John Henry Pratt; and
- Lucy Gisborne Brown, baptised 1836 at Rondebosch, South Africa, appears (as Browne and a spinster) in an official notice of her father's death as executor.
