= Nicholas Carnegie =

British Army officer

Major General Nicholas Carnegie of Coates HEIC (1750–1824) was an 18/19th century British Army Officer.

== Life ==
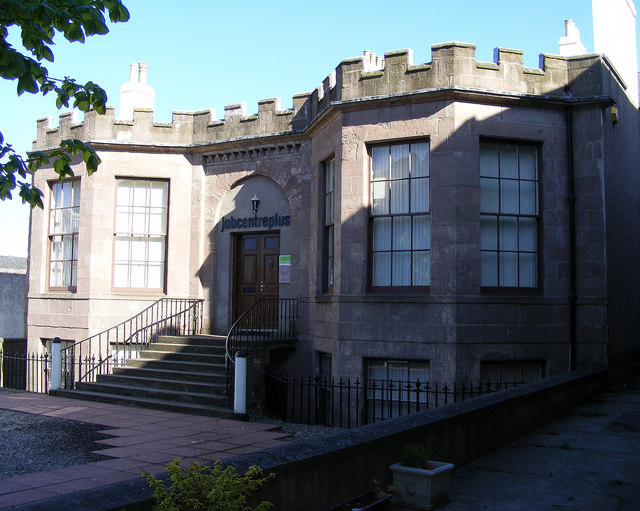
The Castle Stead at Montrose

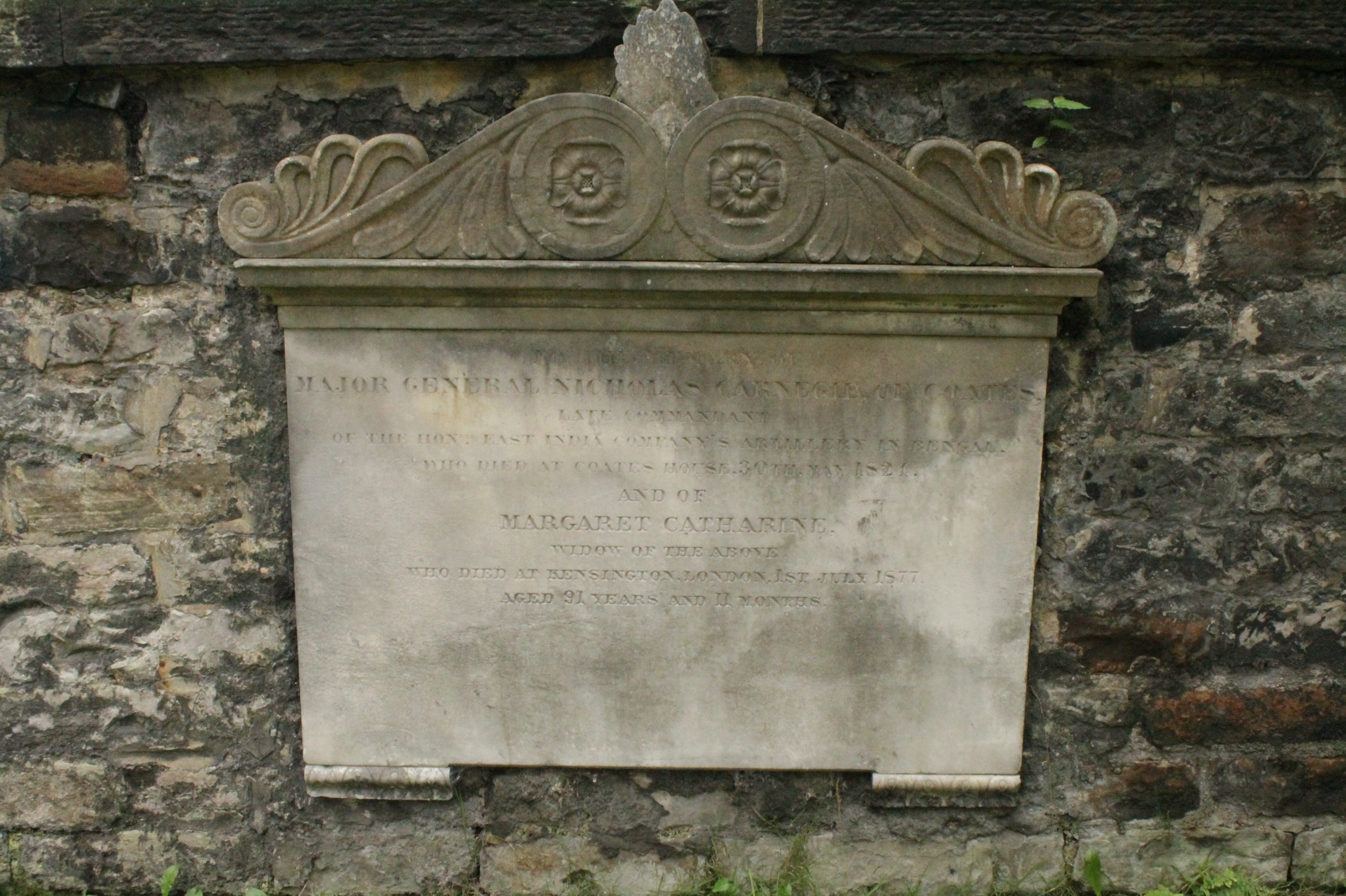
The grave of Major General Nicholas Carnegie, St John's churchyard, Edinburgh

He was stepbrother of George Carnegie whose mother Susan Carnegie was cousin to David Scott, Chairman of the East India Company. This rather tenuous connection was critical to his whole career.

He joined the East India Company as a junior officer (usually an Ensign) around 1765. He served mainly in India to the needs of the Scindia rulers. He reached the rank of Major in 1801. He fought against the Holkar in 1801/2 and in the Battle of Hadapsar in 1802.

He served in the Anglo-Maratha Wars in 1803. This included the mutiny of the 1st Brigade in September 1803 where he and a fellow officer escaped before the Massacre of Assaye.

On 12 November 1804 he was promoted to Lt Colonel.

He was in charge of the Bengal Artillery in India at the rank of Colonel until he resigned in 1808, being replaced by John Horsford.

Around 1810 he purchased The Castle Stead near Montrose from the Marquis of Montrose. He spent his final years in West Coates House in Edinburgh in 1822.

He died at West Coates House in west Edinburgh on 30 May 1824. He is buried in the churchyard of St John's Church on Princes Street in Edinburgh. The grave lies on the lowest terrace.

== Family ==
He was married to Margaret Catherine Boswell (1786-1877), 36 years his junior, who outlived him by half a century.

They had two daughters: Sibella and Susan.
