= St Kentigern's Church, Edinburgh (Union Canal) =

Former church

Coordinates: 55.94042°N 3.21230°W

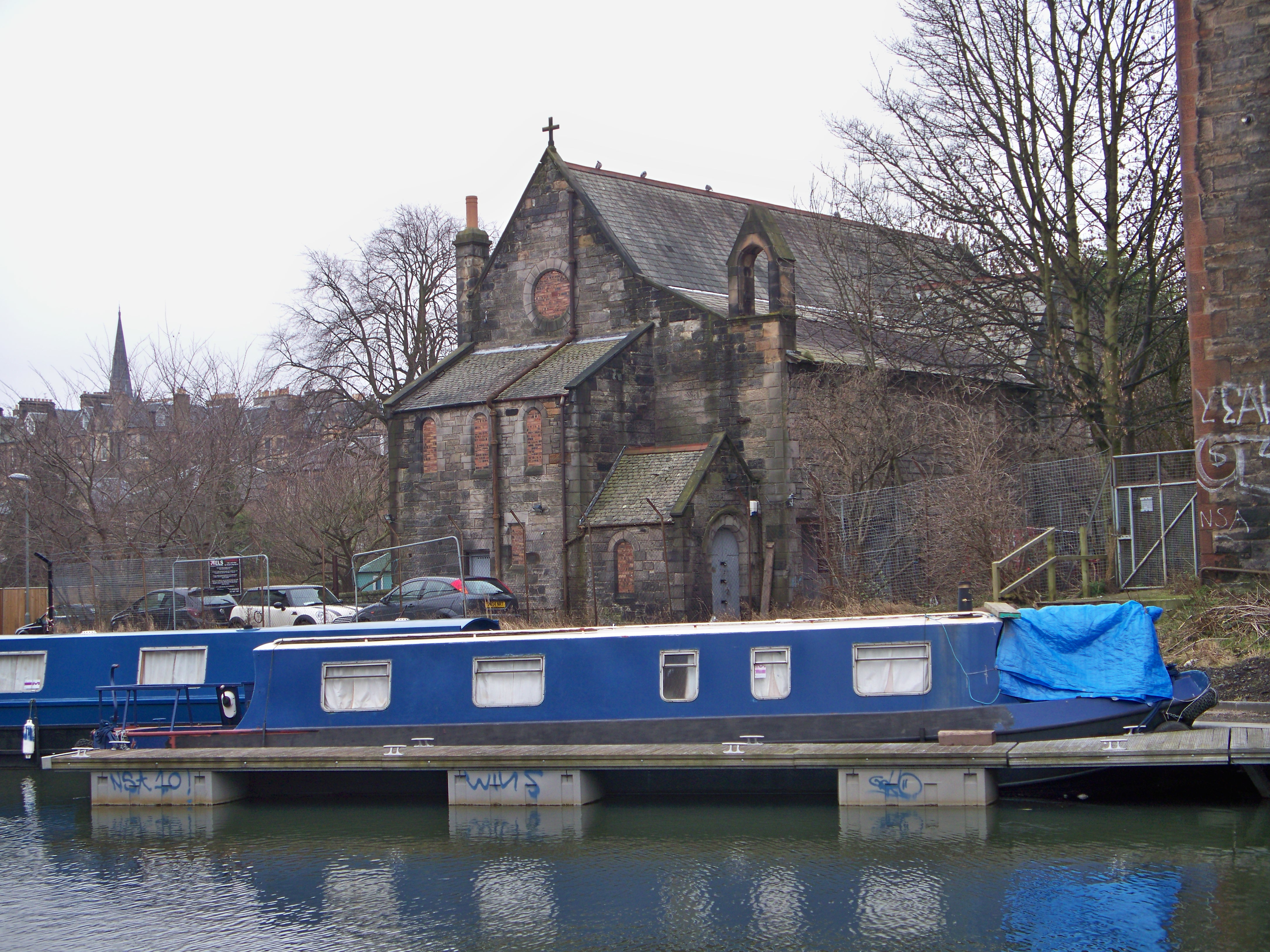
Former St Kentigern's Church, Viewforth

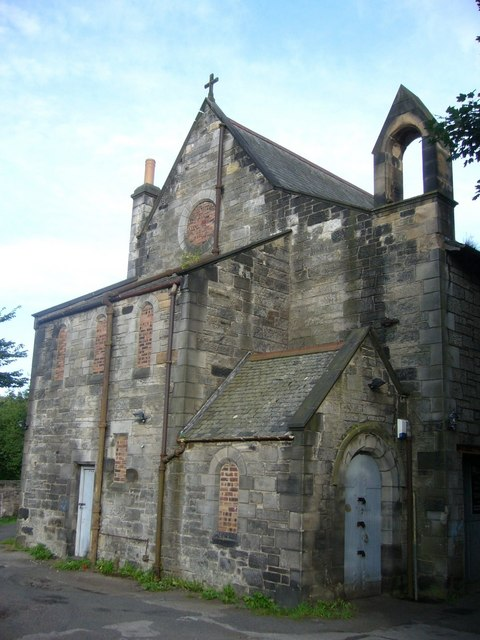
The former St Kentigern's mission church alongside the Union Canal.

St Kentigern's Church is a former Episcopalian church which is now disused in Edinburgh, Scotland. The congregation began in 1859 on Earl Grey Street as a mission station of St John's Episcopal Church on Princes Street. The church is located on the Union Canal in Viewforth and was built in 1897. The stone Gothic-style building was designed by John More Dick Peddie, a prolific Scottish architect and the designer of the Caledonian Hilton building. The church closed in 1941 after which it was used as a nursery and a garage.

In 2005, there was an attempt to demolish the church. In 2015, the church was found to contain a large cannabis haul.

In 2020, City of Edinburgh Council received a planning application to convert the church into residential use. As of 2024, it has been converted into housing.

== St Kentigern ==
In 1925 the church was dedicated to Kentigern (Celtic: “High Lord”), also known as Saint Mungo.

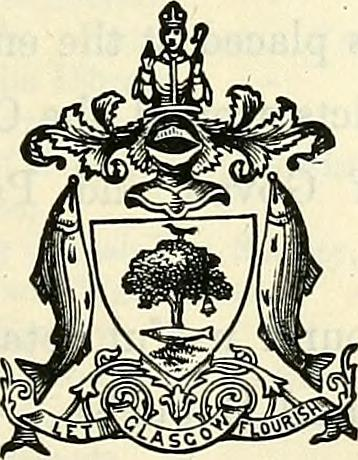
City of Glasgow Crest showing St Kentigern
