= Francis David Millet Brown =

Colonel Francis Brown VC
- Born: 7 August 1837; Bhagalpur, British India
- Died: 21 November 1895 (aged 58); Sandown, Isle of Wight
- Burial place: West Hill Cemetery, Winchester
- Military career
- Allegiance: United Kingdom
- Branch: Bengal Army; British Army; British Indian Army
- Service years: 1855–1894
- Rank: Lieutenant-colonel (Official); Colonel (Field Promotion)
- Units: 1st European Bengal Fusiliers; 101st Regiment of Foot; Indian Staff Corps
- Conflicts: Indian Mutiny; Umbeyla Campaign
- Awards: Victoria Cross

Colonel Francis David Millet Brown VC (7 August 1837 – 21 November 1895) was a British recipient of the Victoria Cross, the highest and most prestigious award for gallantry in the face of the enemy that can be awarded to British and Commonwealth forces.

== Details ==
Brown was born on 7 August 1837 in Bhagalpur, India, the son of George Francis Brown of the Bengal Civil Service. He was educated at Grosvenor College, Bath, and from 1852 to 1854 by a private tutor, Brisco Morland Gane, late curate of Honiton.

He was 20 years old, and a lieutenant in the 1st European Bengal Fusiliers (later The Royal Munster Fusiliers) during the Indian Mutiny when the following deed, on 16 November 1857 at Narnoul, India, for which Brown was awarded the Victoria Cross:

For great gallantry at Narnoul, on the 16th November, 1857, in having, at the imminent risk of his own life, rushed to the assistance of a wounded soldier of the 1st European Bengal Fusiliers, whom he carried off, under a very heavy fire from the enemy, whose cavalry were within forty or fifty yards of him at the time.

He was again promoted, this time to captain 23 August 1864. He returned to the army as major on 7 December 1875. He was promoted to lieutenant colonel 8 December 1881. He was Presented to Queen Victoria at a Levee at St James's Palace on 24 April 1860. He later achieved the rank of colonel.

== Personal life ==
Between 1868 and 1873, Brown was employed as assistant principal of Thomason Civil Engineering College, Roorkee. He married Jessie Rhind Russell. Her date of birth is unknown. They had two sons:

- Frank Russell Brown (24 March 1872 – 4 April 1900). He was commissioned 2nd lieutenant, Royal Munster Fusiliers, and promoted to a lieutenant on 1 August 1895. He died of wounds received in action near Bloemfontein Waterworks in South Africa during the Second Boer War.
- Claude Russell-Brown (11 April 1873 – 19 January 1939). Claude was commissioned as 2nd lieutenant, Royal Engineers, 22 July 1892. He was made a lieutenant 22 July 1895. Claude moved to Canada and was better known as a noted amateur tennis player. He reached the quarterfinals of the men's singles event at the 1908 Summer Olympics and competed at Wimbledon in 1904.

Brown remarried, to Jessie Doris Childs, after the death of his first wife.

== Death ==
Francis David Millet Brown died on 21 November 1895, aged 58, from undisclosed causes, in Sandown, Isle of Wight and was buried in Winchester Cemetery, after a service at Winchester Cathedral.

== See also ==
- List of Indian Mutiny Victoria Cross recipients

== Sources ==
- Harvey, David (1999). Monuments to Courage: Victoria Cross Headstones and Memorials. Vol.1, 1854–1916. Kevin & Kay Patience. OCLC 59437297.
- The Register of the Victoria Cross, This England (1997); ISBN 0-906324-27-0
