= John Campbell (moderator) =

Scottish Church of Scotland minister (1758–1828)

John Campbell (1758–1828) was a Church of Scotland minister who served as Moderator of the General Assembly in 1818.

== Life ==
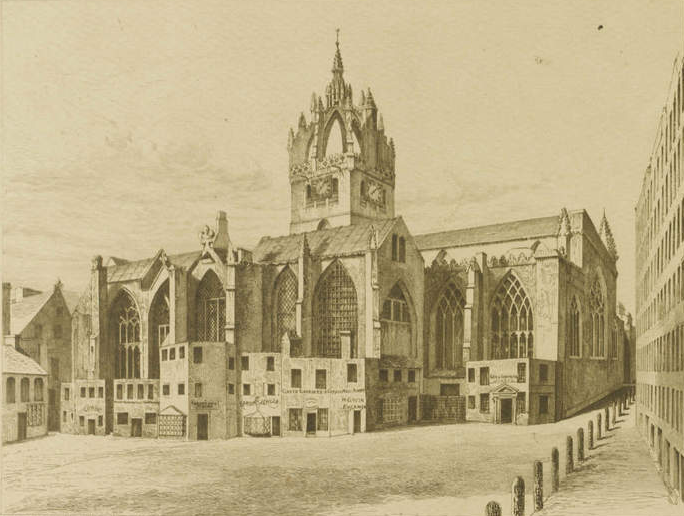
St Giles' from the south c. 1700

He was born in Glasgow on 24 May 1758 the son of Daniel Campbell, a merchant. He was educated at Glasgow Grammar School then studied at Glasgow University. In August 1781 he was licensed to preach as a Church of Scotland minister by the Presbytery of Glasgow.

His first role (1782) was as private chaplain to Willielma Campbell, Lady Glenorchy. In that capacity he may have assisted Rev Thomas Snell Jones for a year at Lady Glenorchy's Church in Edinburgh (but as a Church of Scotland minister could not officially preside as the General Assembly did not approve of this privately built chapel).

In May 1783 he was ordained as minister of Kippen. After two decades there, in October 1805 he was chosen as minister of Tolbooth parish, one of the four parishes contained within the subdivided St Giles Cathedral as second charge under Rev Thomas Randall Davidson. In 1806 he was chosen as Secretary of the Society in Scotland for Propagating Christian Knowledge and in 1807 was awarded an honorary Doctor of Divinity by Edinburgh University. He is listed as living at Society Hall on the Netherbow.

In May 1818 he succeeded Rev Gavin Gibb as Moderator of the General Assembly, and was succeeded in turn in 1819 by Rev Duncan Macfarlan.

He lived his final years at 45 Albany Street and died there on 30 August 1828 and was buried in Greyfriars Kirkyard.

== Family ==
In 1788 he married Christian Innes daughter of Robert Innes of Gifford Vale, a country house north of Gifford, East Lothian. Christian died in April 1796. In October 1801 he married Jean Kinnear daughter of Thomas Kinnear a Director of the Bank of Scotland. their children included:

- Daniel (1803-1809)
- Elizabeth (b.1806)
- Mary (b.1808) married Rev James Barclay Mellis of Tealing
- Jane (b.1810)
- Margaret (b.1814) married Charles James Kerr
- Jane married Rev Dr John Gordon Lorimer (1804-1868) grandparents to John Gordon Lorimer

== Publications ==
- Reflections on the Death of HRH Princess Charlotte (1817)
- The Acclamation of the Redeemed (1818)
- A Sermon After the Interment of Robert Balfour DD (1818)
