= Sir James Milles Riddell, 2nd Baronet =

Sir James Milles Riddell (sometimes shown as James Milne Riddell) FRSE DCL, 2nd Baronet of Ardnamurchan and Sunart (1787–1861) was a 19th-century Scottish landowner and agricultural improver.

== Life ==
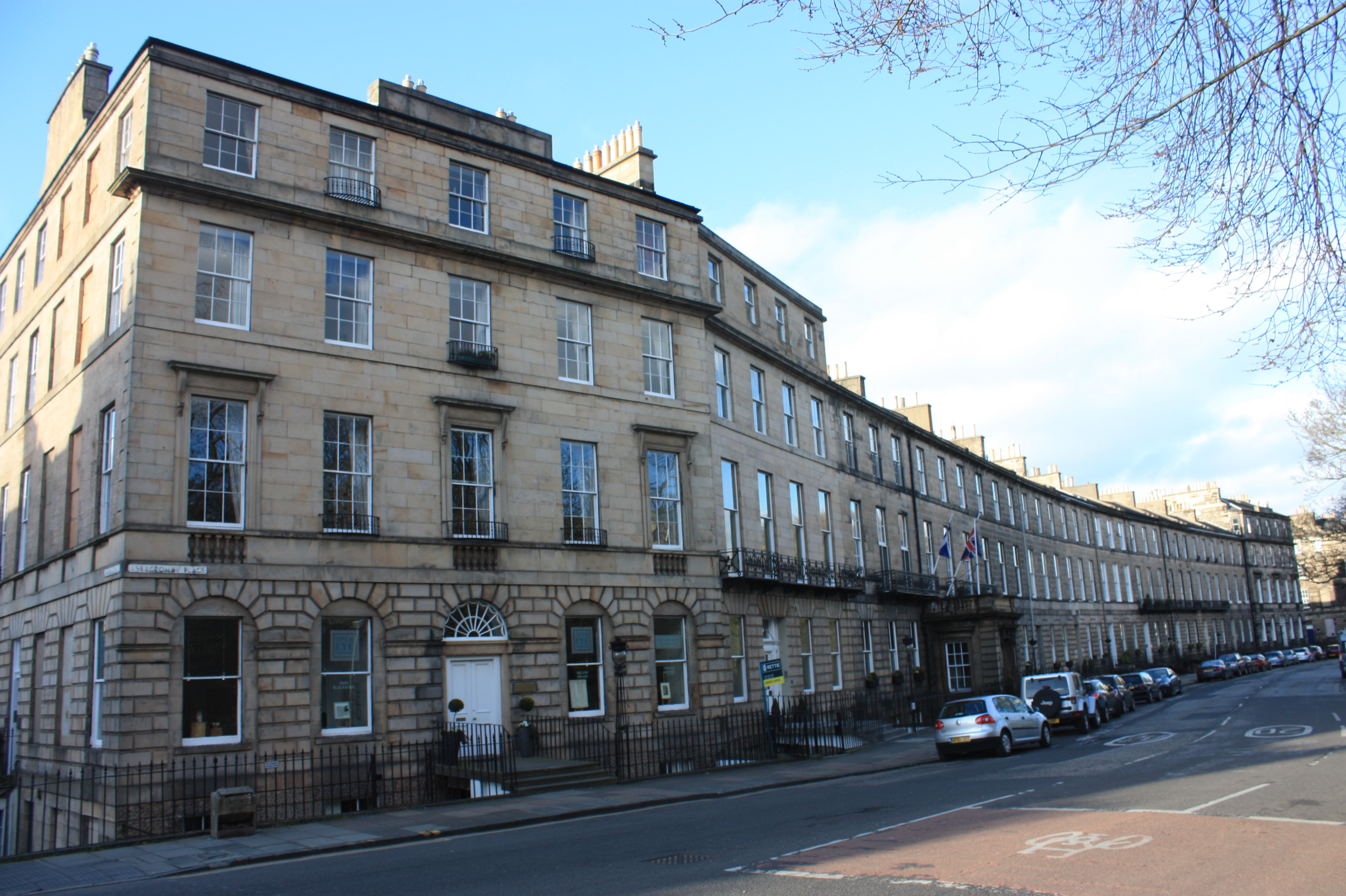
Abercromby Place in Edinburgh

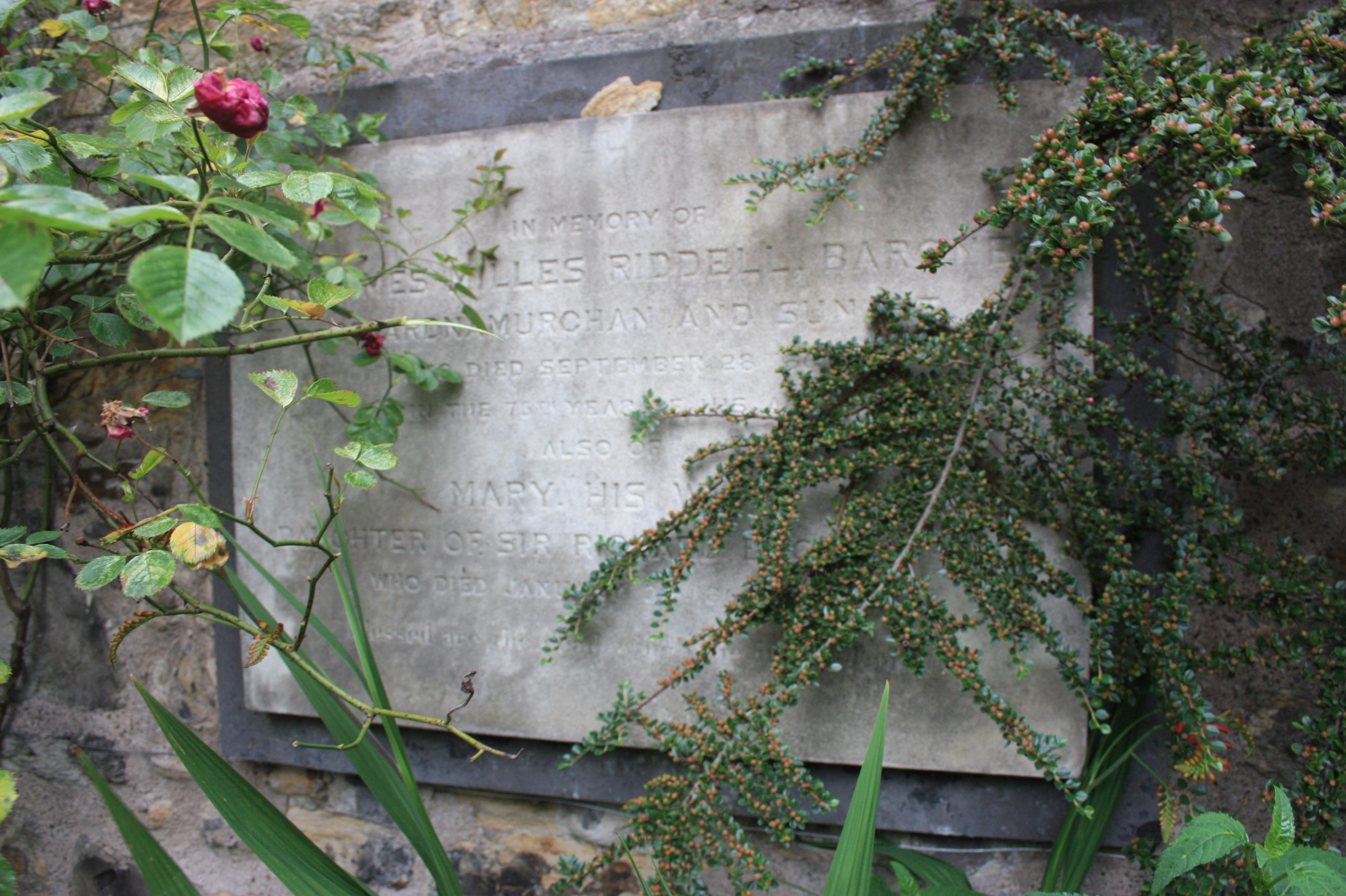
The grave of Sir James Milles Riddell, St Johns, Princes Street

He was born on 3 June 1787 the son of Thomas Riddell, and his wife, Margaretta Campbell. His grandfather Sir James Riddell, 1st Baronet of Ardnamurchan and Sunart outlived his father Thomas, and on James' death in 1797 James Milles Riddell became 2nd baronet at the age of ten.

They lived at the family estate of Strontian in Argyleshire where in 1791 Thomas Charles Hope first discovered strontium (originally called strontianite, in recognition of its finding place).

He studied at Christ Church, Oxford. In 1820 he had a townhouse in Edinburgh's Second New Town at 30 Abercromby Place.

In 1821 he was elected a Fellow of the Royal Society of Edinburgh, his proposer being Thomas Charles Hope.

In 1828 the clachans (tied villages) of Bourblaige and Tornamona were, on the instructions of Sir James Milles Riddell, brutally cleared. "In one case a half-witted woman was locked in her cottage, the door being barricaded on the outside by mason-work. ... The laird's men shot the dogs, shot the goats, drove away the cows, then they took the roofs off. It was in the wintertime that they did it. Ploughs were put through the potato pits so that they would spoil in the frost."

He died in Edinburgh on 28 September 1861 and is buried in St John's Churchyard at the west end of Princes Street. The grave lies in the north-west corner of the enclosure attached to the east end of the church.

== Family ==
In 1822 he married Mary Brooke, daughter of Sir Richard Brooke, 5th Baronet.

They had one daughter, Mary Augusta Riddell (died 1879).

On his death the baronetcy passed to Thomas Miles Riddell, a cousin.

== Artistic recognition ==
His portrait by Joseph Slater, Jr. was later engraved by Frederick Christian Lewis.

Baronetage of Great Britain
Preceded by James Riddell	Baronet (of Ardnamurchan); 1797–1861	Succeeded by Thomas Miles Riddell
