= Aeneas Mackintosh (priest) =

- Born: 1 July 1927; Inverness, Scotland
- Died: 8 December 1998 (aged 71)
- Education: Kelham Theological College
- Spouse: Eileen Mary Barlow (m. 1956)
- Children: 4 sons
- Religion: Anglican
- Ordained: 1952 (deacon); 1953 (priest)
- Title: The Reverend Canon

Aeneas Mackintosh (1927–1998) was a 20th-century clergyman of the Scottish Episcopal Church.

== Education and family ==
Born Inverness, he was educated at Kelham Theological College in Nottinghamshire, 1944–45 and 1948–52. He was ordained as a deacon in 1952 and a priest in 1953. In 1956, he married his wife Eileen Mary Barlow, and they had four sons: Richard, Mark, Simon and Christopher.

== Ministry positions ==
- Precentor at St Andrew's Cathedral, Inverness, 1952–55.
- Curate at St Augustine's Church, Wisbech, Cambridgeshire, 1955–57.
- Curate-in-charge at St Matthew's, Glasgow, 1957–60, and then Rector, 1960–61.
- Rector of Haddington, East Lothian, 1961–65.
- Diocesan Inspector of Schools for the Diocese of Edinburgh, 1963–81.
- Assistant priest at St John's, Edinburgh, 1965–69, and then Rector, 1969–81.
- Senior Tutor, Diocese of Edinburgh Training for Ministry (T.F.M.), 1972–87.
- Canon of St Mary's Cathedral, Edinburgh, 1975.
- Rector of North Berwick and Gullane, 1981–87.
- Provincial Information Officer and Communication Advisor, 1987–92.

He retired in June 1992 and died on 8 December 1998.

== Notes ==
Scottish Episcopal Church titles
Preceded by Keith Appleby Arnold	Rector of St John's, Edinburgh; 1969 – 1981	Succeeded by Neville Chamberlain
