= St John's, Edinburgh =

Historic site in Scotland

Coordinates: 55.9500°N 3.2061°W

St John's Church
- The Parish Church of Saint John the Evangelist
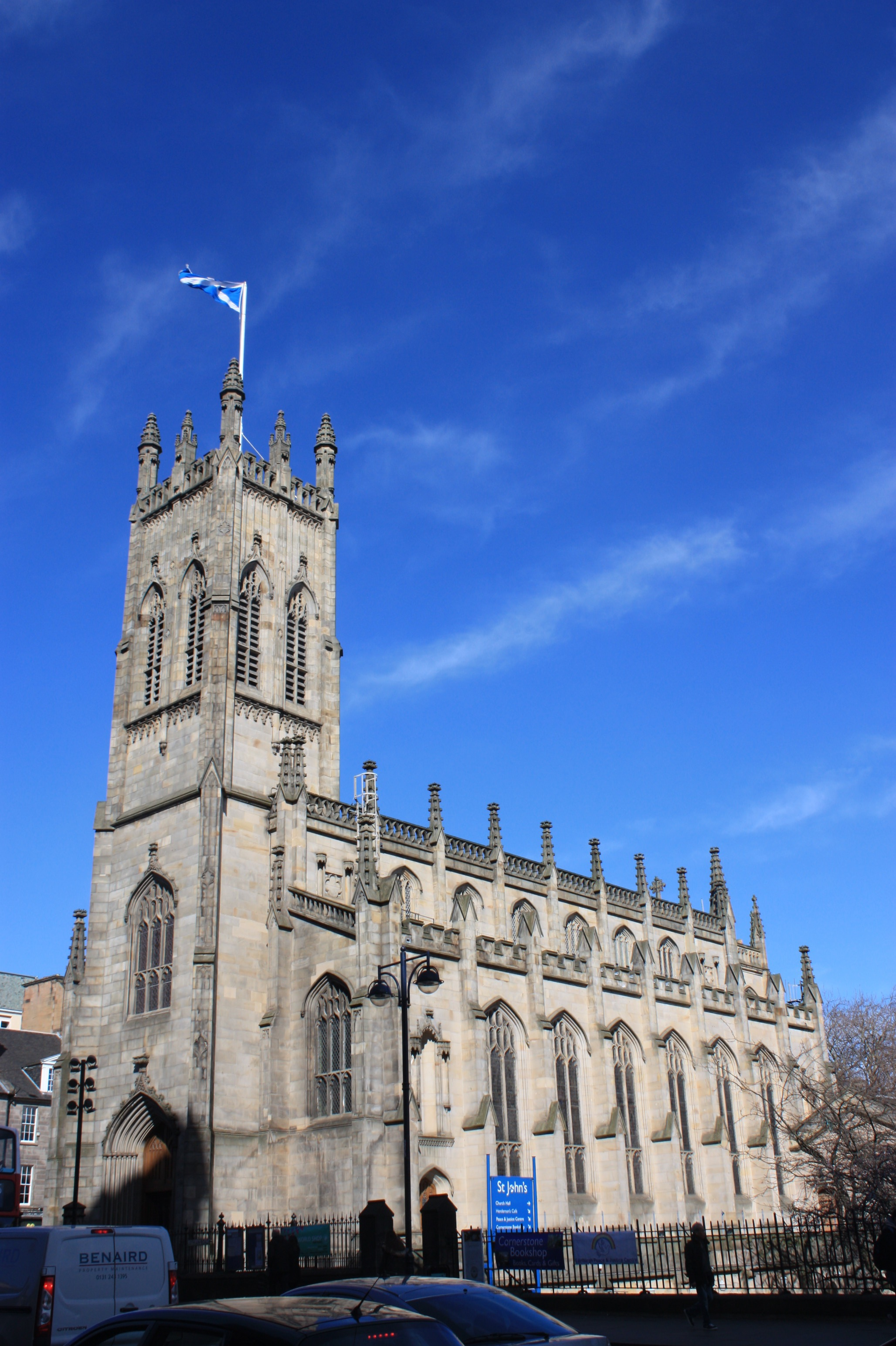
- St John's Church
- Location: 1A Lothian Road, Edinburgh EH1 2AB
- Country: Scotland
- Denomination: Scottish Episcopal Church
- Website: St John's Episcopal Church, Edinburgh

History
- Status: Active
- Dedication: John the Evangelist
- Dedicated: 19 March 1818

Architecture
- Functional status: Parish church
- Architect: William Burn
- Architectural type: Neo-gothic
- Groundbreaking: 1816

Administration
- Diocese: Edinburgh

Clergy
- Bishop: Vacant
- Rector: Revd Dr David Bagnall

The Church of St John the Evangelist is a Scottish Episcopal church in the centre of Edinburgh, Scotland. It is sited at the west end of Princes Street at its junction with Lothian Road, and is protected as a category A listed building.

== Background ==
The church was dedicated as St John's Chapel on Maundy Thursday 1818 with construction having begun in 1816. It was designed by the architect William Burn the previous year, at the age of only 25.

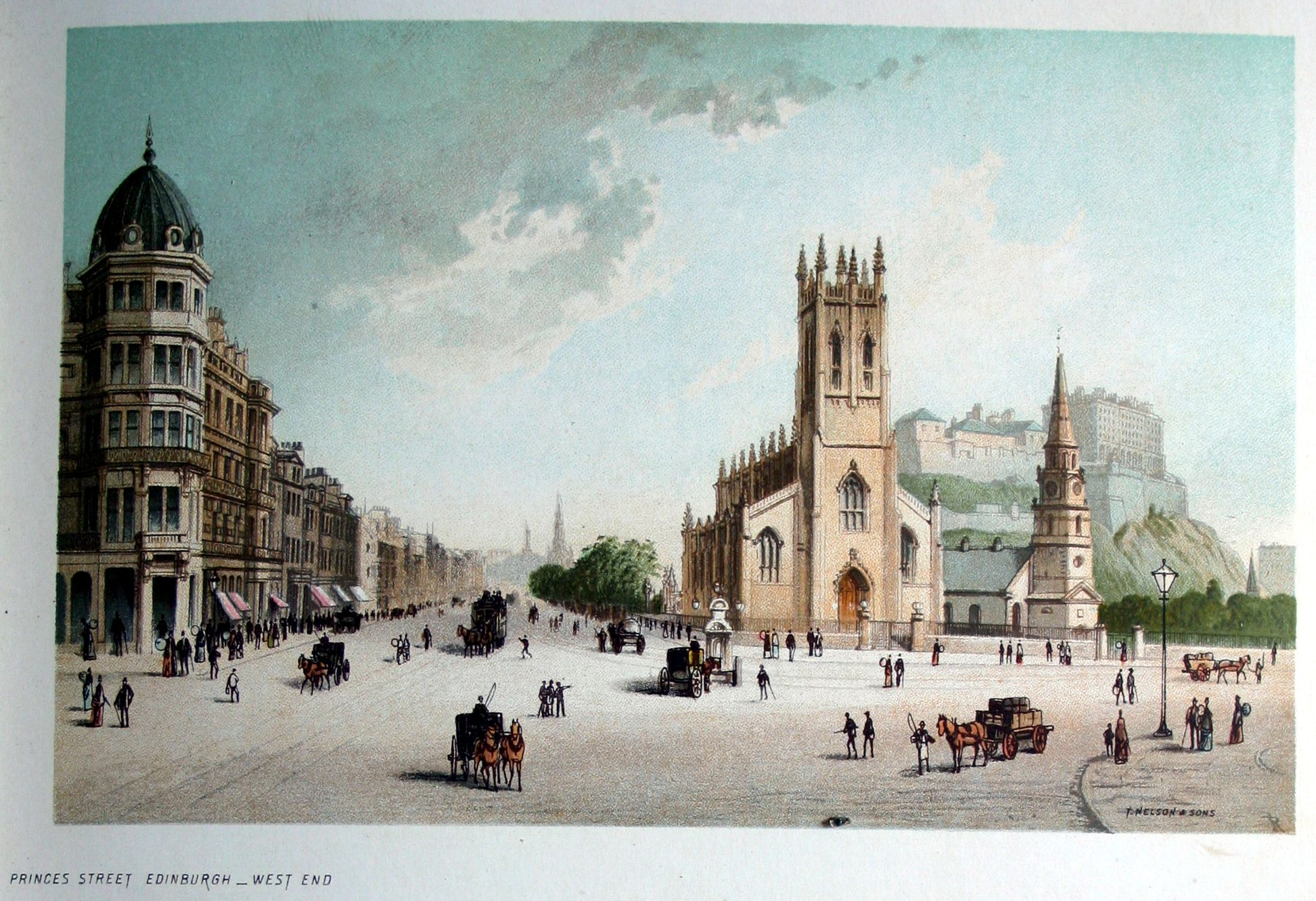
1889 view looking east along Princes Street, with the church to the right in front of St Cuthbert's Church and Edinburgh Castle

The congregation had begun in 1792 when Daniel Sandford came to Edinburgh to minister on Church of England lines. In 1797 the Qualified congregation moved to Charlotte Chapel which was re-built on larger lines in 1811. They sold shares to fund a new church, the banker Sir William Forbes being the main figure, and Charlotte Chapel was then sold to the Baptists.

Edward Bannerman Ramsay joined St John's as curate in 1827. He succeeded Bishop Sandford as minister in 1830, and stayed until his own death in 1872, having been Dean from 1846.

The sanctuary and chancel were built in 1879–82 by Peddie & Kinnear (John Dick Peddie and Charles Kinnear). The vestry and Hall were added in 1915–16 by John More Dick Peddie and Forbes Smith.

The war memorial was added in 1919 to a design by Sir Robert Lorimer. Lorimer also designed and oversaw the addition of faux-vaults when Lothian Road was widened in 1926.

St John's holds daily services and is one of the few remaining Episcopal churches in Scotland to hold the weekly service of Matins.

== Description ==
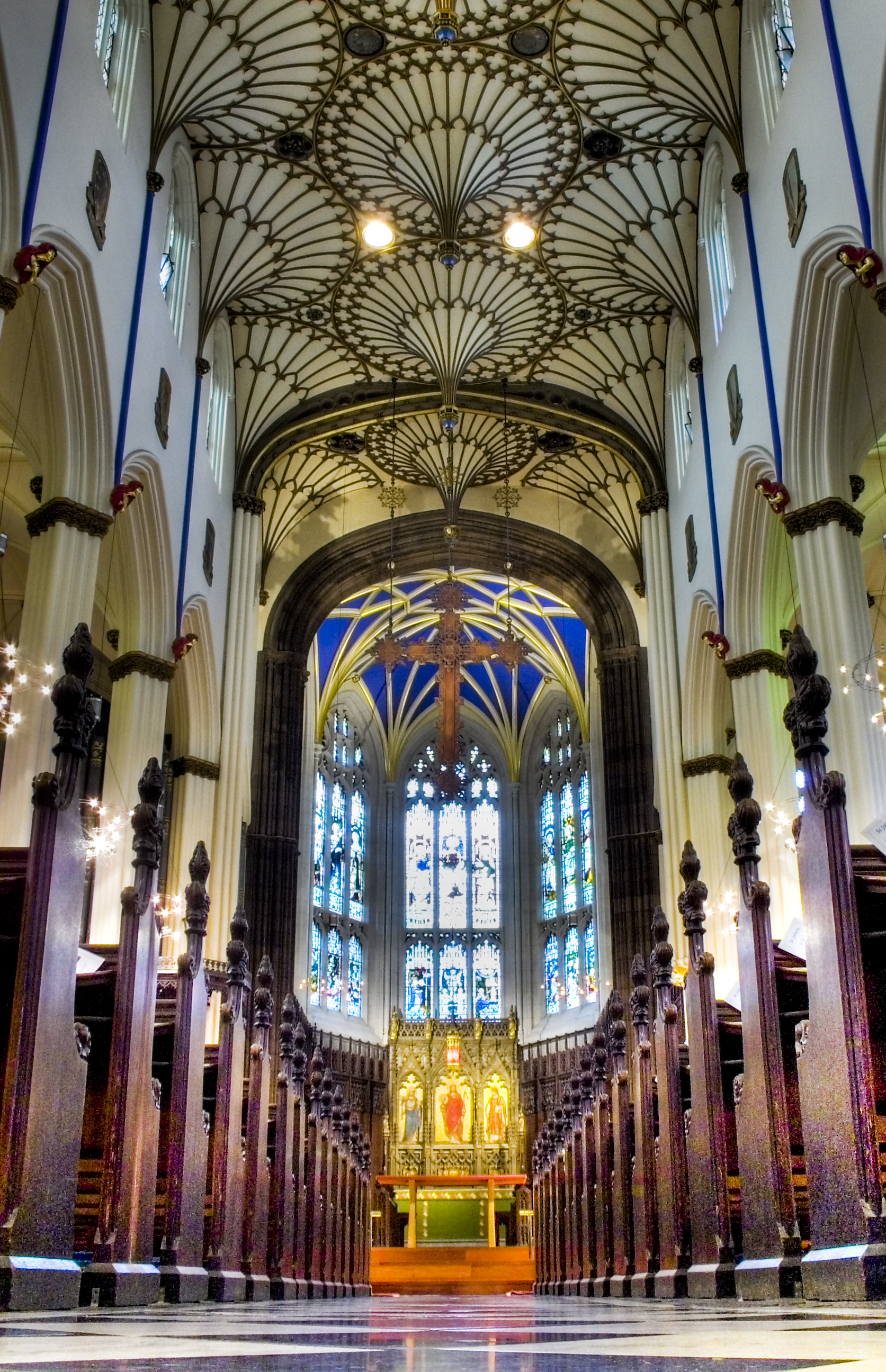
Interior, St John's Church

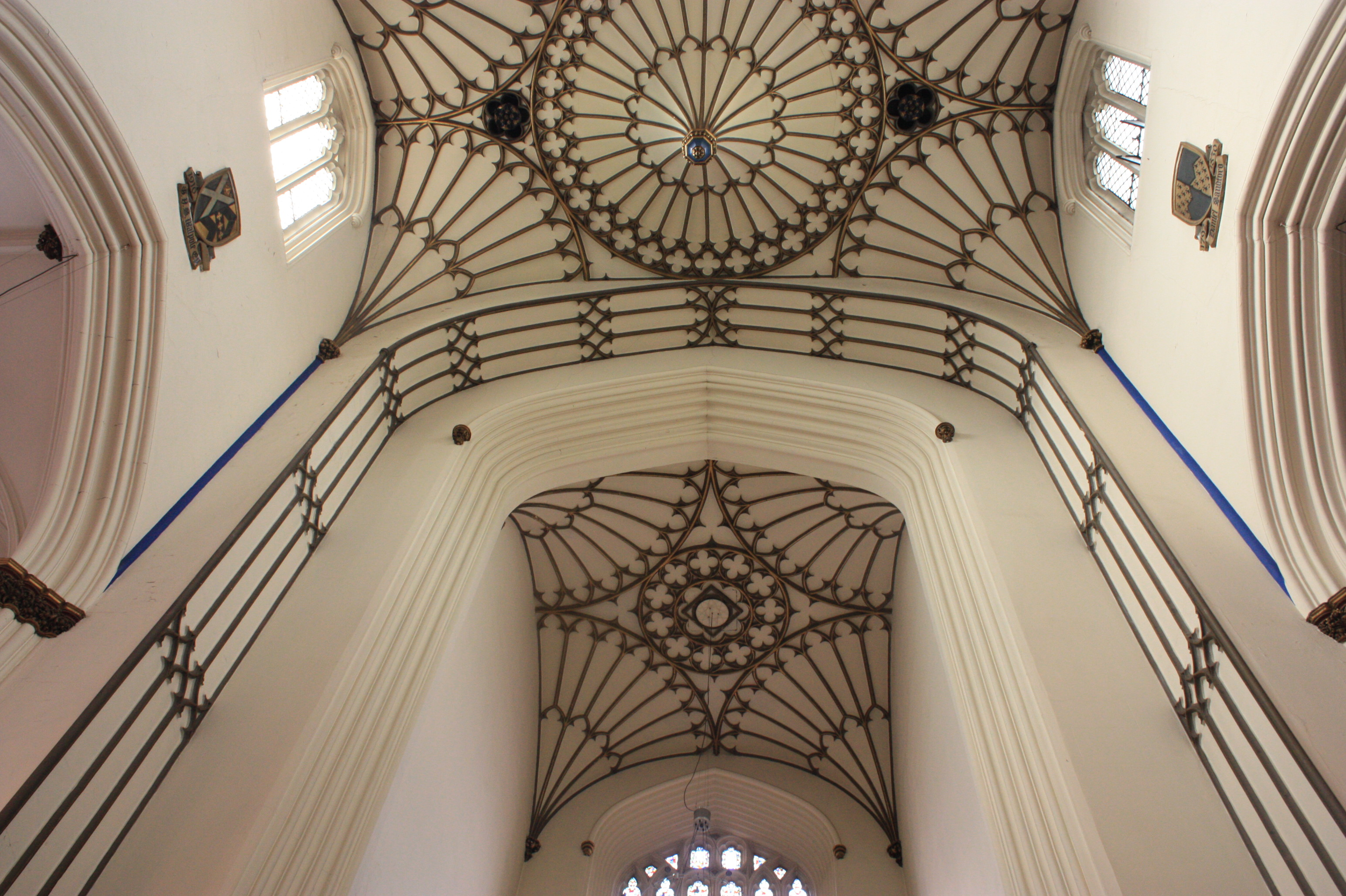
The supporting arch to the west tower

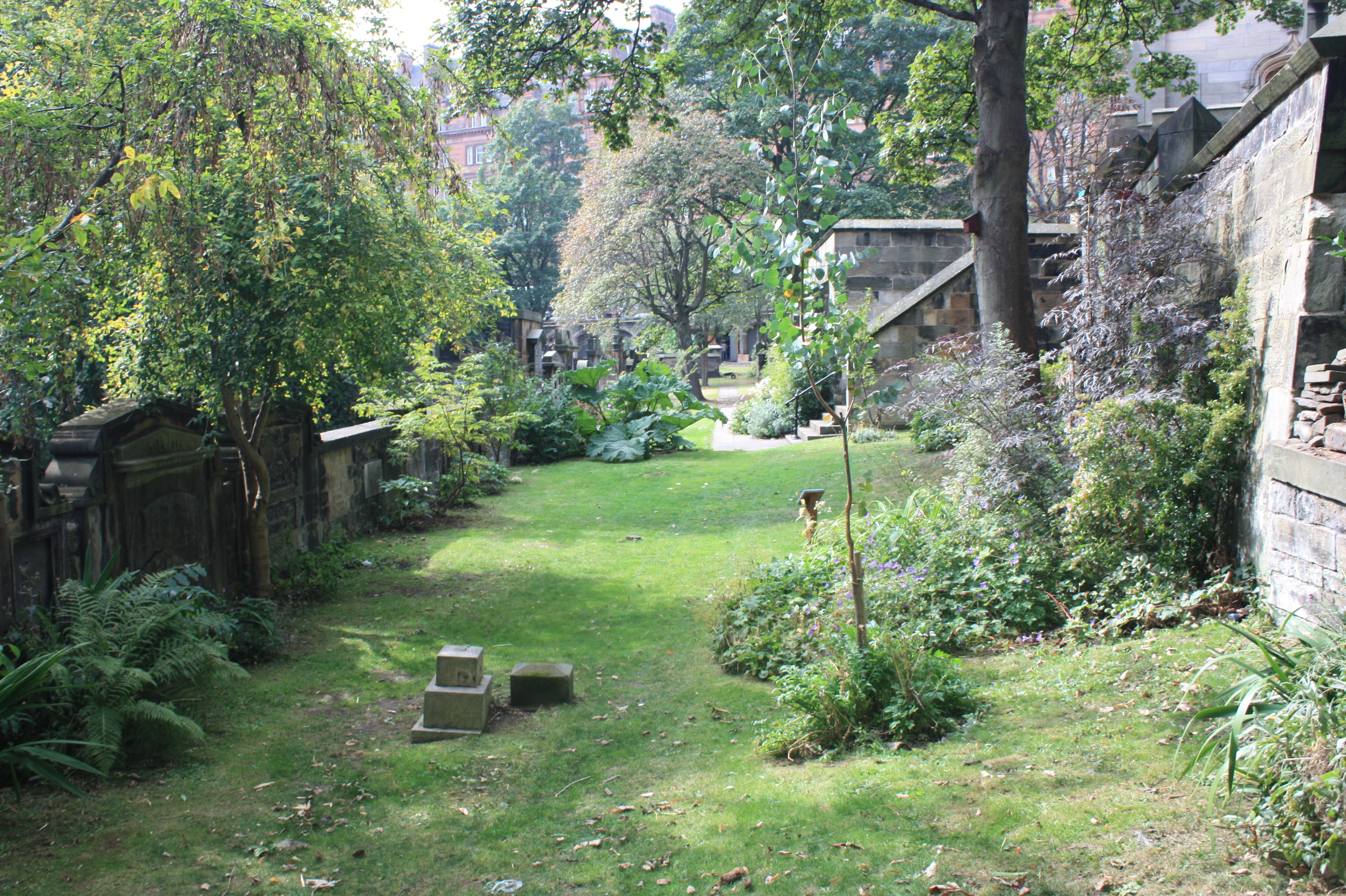
The lower terraces of the graveyard

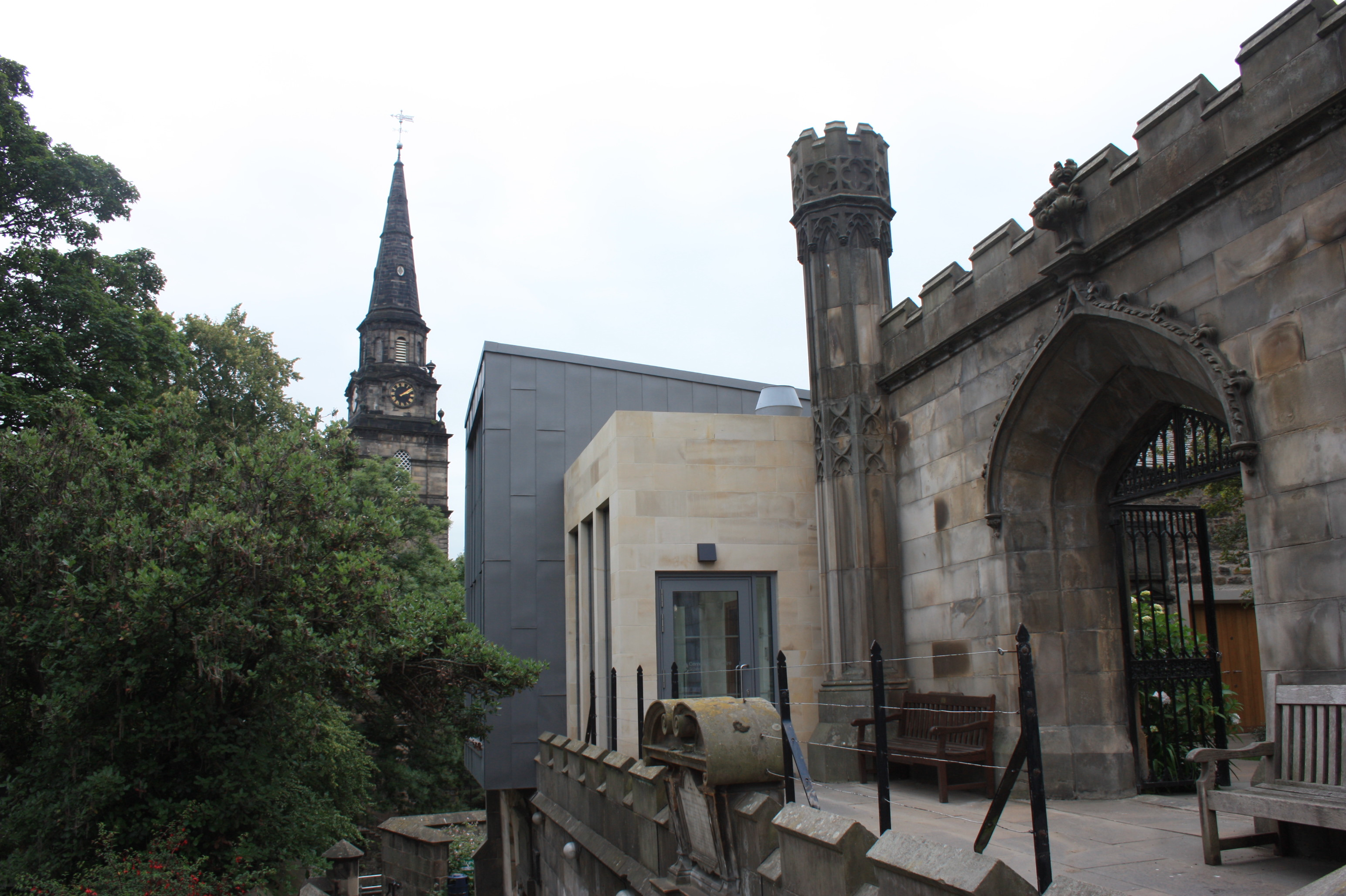
The 2018 extension to St John's

The plaster pendant fan vault ceiling is derived from that found in the Henry VII Chapel in Westminster Abbey.

Stained glass is largely by Ballantine, but the east window is by William Raphael Eginton.

The morning chapel was furnished by Walker Todd in 1935.

An extension was added to the south-east corner in 2018.

== List of rectors ==
- 1804–1830: Daniel Sandford
- 1830–1872: Edward Bannerman Ramsay
- 1873–1883: Daniel Fox Sandford
- 1883–1909: George James Cowley-Brown
- 1909–1919: George Frederick Terry
- 1919–1926: James Geoffrey Gordon
- 1927–1939: Charles Henry Ritchie
- 1940–1947: Sidney Harvie-Clark
- 1947–1961: David Brownfield Porter
- 1962–1969: Keith Appleby Arnold
- 1969–1981: Aeneas Mackintosh
- 1982–1997: Neville Chamberlain
- 1998–2012: John Andrew Armes
- 2013–2024: Markus Dünzkofer
- 2025-now : David Bagnall

== Memorials ==
- General Sir John Campbell, 2nd Baronet of New Brunswick, (present-day Canada)
- Sir Henry Raeburn
- Dean Edward Bannerman Ramsay (a tall granite Celtic cross by Robert Rowand Anderson of 1878 with Celtic bronze reliefs by Skidmore, facing Princes Street just east of the church)
- John Stuart Stuart-Forbes (1849–1876) (also known as J. S. Hiley; died at the Battle of the Little Bighorn in North America. His plaque can be found on the left hand side of the church as you enter) The plaque reads "In Memory of John Stuart Stuart Forbes 7th Regt. United States Cavalry. Born at Rugby 28th May 1849. Killed in Action 25th June 1876."

== Graveyard ==
- The Rev Archibald Alison (1757–1839) and his son William Pulteney Alison (1790–1859)
- Sir William Arbuthnot, 1st Baronet (1766–1829)
- Lesley Baillie (1768–1843) subject of Robert Burns' poem "Bonnie Lesley"
- Thomas Balfour (1810–1838), MP for Orkney and Shetland
- George Joseph Bell (1770–1843), legal author
- George Burnett, Lord Lyon (1822–1890)
- General Sir Archibald Campbell, 1st Baronet (1769–1843)
- William Campbell, Lord Skerrington (1855–1927), Senator of the College of Justice 1908-9
- Major General Nicholas Carnegie of Coates (d.1824)
- Sir James Clerk of Penicuik (1812–1870)
- James Donaldson (1751–1830), founder of Donaldson's School for the Deaf
- Andrew Duncan (1773–1832)
- Daniel Ellis (botanist) (1772–1841)
- William Erskine (1773–1852) historian
- Sir Hugh Bates Maxwell and Sir William Maxwell, 9th and 10th Baronets of Calderwood (within the eastern enclosure)
- Sir William Forbes's son George Forbes (died 1857)
- Sir William Hamilton, 9th Baronet (1788–1856), metaphysician (stone moved and used as edge paving in the eastern enclosure)
- Alexander Irving, Lord Newton (1766–1832) law lord
- Thomas Kinnear (1796–1830) banker
- Thomas Laycock (physiologist) (1812–1874)
- James Skene (d.1864) and his son William Forbes Skene (1805–1892) buried under the chapel
- Aeneas James George Mackay (1839–1911)
- Charles Kincaid Mackenzie, Lord Mackenzie (d.1938)
- General Anthony MacRae (1812–1868), with bronze by Sir John Steell
- George Moir (1800–1870), lawyer and essayist
- John Shank More (1784–1861)
- Macvey Napier (1776–1847)
- Margaret Outram (1778–1863), widow of Benjamin Outram
- Bouverie Francis Primrose (1813–1898)
- Anne (1793–1825), sister of Stamford Raffles
- Dean Edward Bannerman Ramsay (buried distant from the memorial on Princes Street (see above) with a separate monument) and his brother Admiral Sir William Ramsay (1796–1871)
- Bishop Harry Reid (died 1943)
- Sir James Milles Riddell, 2nd Baronet (1787–1861)
- Anne Rutherford (mother of Sir Walter Scott)
- Daniel Rutherford (1749–1819) discoverer of nitrogen (uncle of Sir Walter Scott)
- Daniel Fox Sandford (1831–1906), Bishop of Tasmania, son of Daniel Sandford (bishop of Edinburgh), founder of the church.
- Catherine Sinclair (1800–1864), author
- Sir John James Stuart of Allanbank (1779–1849)
- James Syme (1799–1870), surgeon
- Peter Guthrie Tait (1831–1901) and his sons John Guthrie Tait (1861–1945) and William Archer Porter Tait (1866–1929) plus a memorial to Frederick Guthrie Tait (buried in South Africa)
- William John Thomson RSA (1771–1845), American-born artist, member of the Royal Scottish Academy
- James Walker (1781–1862), civil engineer
- Bishop James Walker (1770–1841)
- Sir William Stuart Walker (1813–1896)
- George Young, Lord Young (1819–1907)
- Malvina Wells (1804–1887) only known person buried in Edinburgh who was born enslaved.

== Edinburgh City Centre Churches Together ==
St John's is one of three churches which form Together, an ecumenical grouping in the New Town of Edinburgh. The others are St Andrew's & St George's West and St Cuthbert's.

== Just Festival ==
The church is also home to the Just Festival (formerly known as the Festival of Spirituality and Peace), which takes place each August alongside the Edinburgh Festival Fringe.

== Tabot ==
An Ethiopian tabot, a replica of Moses' Tablets of Law, was discovered in storage at St John's Church, and was returned in February 2002 to Addis Ababa.

== Beliefs ==
=== Marriage ===
The church has an inclusive vision and celebrates both opposite-sex marriages and same-sex marriages.

In 2017 the Scottish Episcopal Church changed its marriage canon, allowing clergy (with the consent of their congregations) to opt into the Scottish same-sex marriage legislation. The first marriage of a couple of the same gender inside an Anglican church in the British Isles was solemnised at St John's in September that year with the rector presiding.

== See also ==
- St Kentigern's Church, Edinburgh (Union Canal), began as a mission from St John's
