= Allison Greenlees =

- Born: Allison Hope Cargill; 13 August 1896; Hillhead, Glasgow, Scotland
- Died: 4 August 1979 (aged 82); Edinburgh, Scotland
- Organization: Girlguiding Scotland
- Known for: Scotland's First Girl Guide
- Spouse: James Greenlees (m. 1922; died 1951)
- Children: Robert Greenlees, Mary Campbell Allison Greenlees
- Awards: Silver Fish Award

Allison Greenlees (born Allison Hope Cargill; 13 August 1896 – 4 August 1979) was a Scottish Girl Guide leader who is recognised as Scotland's first Girl Guide. in 1908, two years before Girl Guides were founded, she formed a patrol of girl scouts in Glasgow. She was a founder member of Girlguiding Scotland.

== Early life ==
Born in Hillhead, Glasgow, she was the daughter of Mary Hope Walker Grierson and Sir John Cargill, 1st Baronet. She had no brother and if she had been a son then she would have become a baronet. Greenlees set up a precursor to Girl Guides with five friends from Laurel Bank School, the Cuckoo Patrol, after reading an edition of Scouting for Boys and wanted something like the Boy Scouts to be available to girls. In 1909, the Cuckoo Patrol was adopted into the First Glasgow Scout Group, a year before The Girl Guides Association was established by Agnes Baden-Powell in 1910. and the Cuckoo Patrol became the Girl Guide Thistle Patrol.

== Girl Guiding ==
In 1908, Greenlees bought the first issue of Scouting for Boys, which inspired her to form the Cuckoo Patrol later that year with five friends from Laurel Bank School in Glasgow. In 1909, the Cuckoo Patrol was affiliated to the 1st Glasgow Scout Group.

The Cuckoo Patrol met regularly in a stable loft to learn similar skills to the Boy Scouts, like practising knot tying by lowering each other from the loft to the stable yard. They quickly gained recognition: a local Scoutmaster came to their weekly meetings to examine them for their tests and on one occasion they were allowed to parade with the Scouts.

In 1910 Guiding became official and the Cuckoo Patrol became the Thistle Patrol of the Girl Guides; though the patrol was never officially registered because Greenlees left Glasgow in late 1910 to attend school in Malvern, Worcestershire. The first Glasgow Guide company was not registered until December 1911.

There had been a patrol of Girl Scouts affiliated to an Edinburgh scout troop and was registered as the 1st Midlothian in July 1910, later changing to 1st Edinburgh which still meets today. Though the first Girl Guide Company to register in Scotland was the 1st Peebles Company.

Greenlees went on to a private school in Malvern and a Guide Company was started in 1911 with a strong Scottish Connection. One of the company was Loelia Buchan Hepburn who became the first County Commissioner for East Lothian and Deputy Commissioner for Scotland aged 20.

Greenlees returned to Glasgow and developed Guiding there. When the First World War broke out she used her experience to help raise the Glasgow Battalion of the Women's Voluntary Reserve (WVR). After the war, as Division Commissioner she enrolled 30 Guides at a time.

In 1930, she became County Commissioner Girlguiding Midlothian and in 1953 she became President of Girlguiding Scotland. She was awarded the Silver Fish Award which is the Girl Guiding's highest adult honour, in 1939.

== Career ==
She retired here after her husband died.

After the start of the First World War, she turned her skills to help set up the Glasgow Battalion of the Women's Emergency Corps.

== Legacy ==
Allison Cargill House is a registered charity named for her, and it supplies bunk house accommodation in East Lothian for Brownies and other Sections of Guiding to camp at.

== Personal life ==
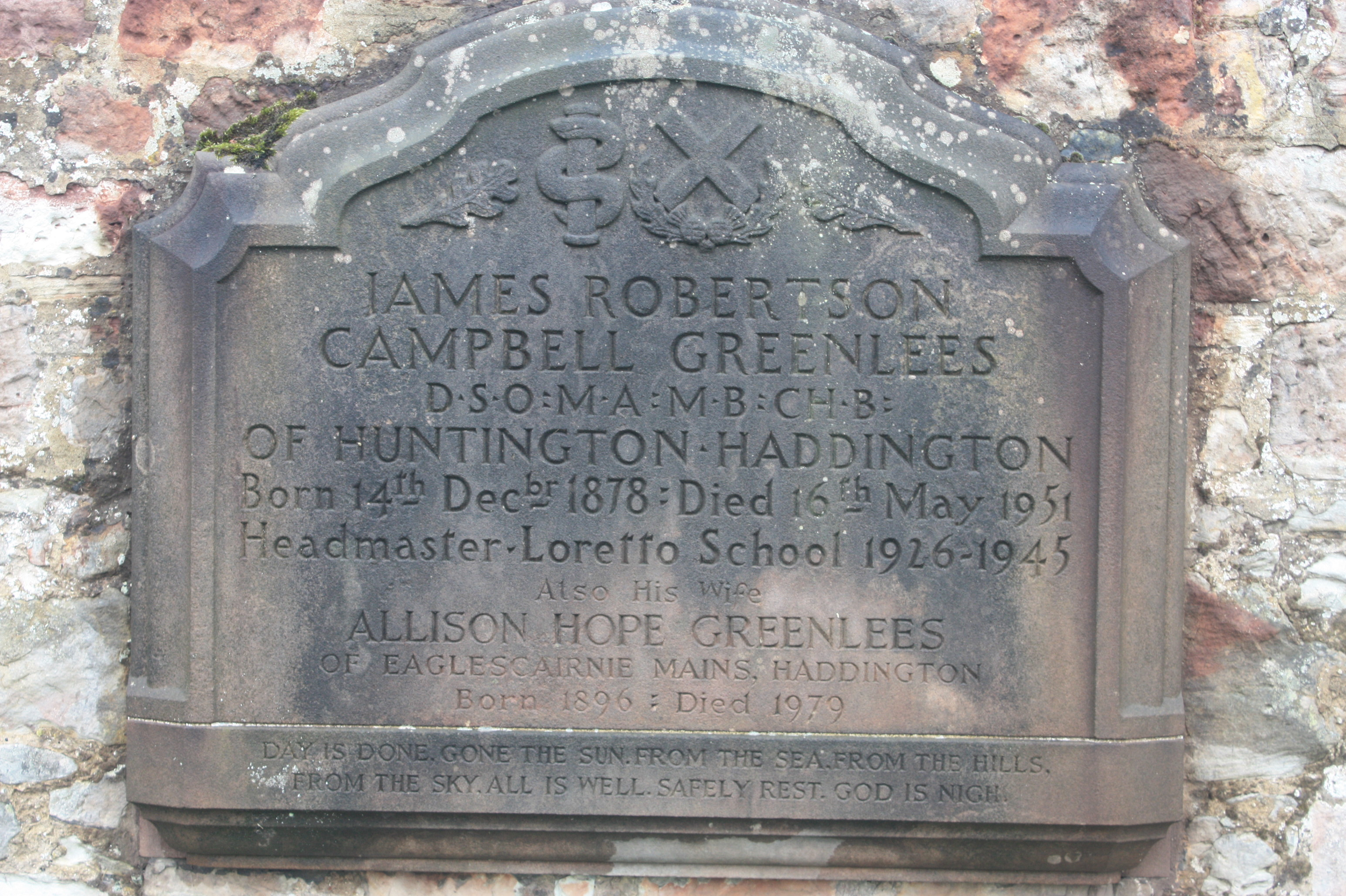
Greenlees' grave, Inveresk Cemetery

In 1922 she married Dr James Greenlees who became headmaster of Loretto Public School, Musselburgh, from 1926-1946, living in Inveresk. They had a son and a daughter, Robert and Mary Campbell Allison (1925-2003). Her husband died in 1951 and she bought the farmhouse and steading of Eaglescairnie House. She died in Edinburgh on 4 August 1979.
