= Park School for Girls =

Location
- 25 Lynedoch St; Glasgow, G3 6AA; Scotland

Information
- Type: Private day school
- Established: 1880
- Founder: Glasgow Girls School Company
- Closed: 1996
- Gender: Girls School
- Houses: Bruce, Kelvin, Raeburn and Scott
- Colours: Navy Blue and Green

Park School for Girls was a private all-girls school in Glasgow, Scotland. The school merged with Laurel Bank School and the resulting Laurel Park School was absorbed into Hutchesons' Grammar School in 2002.

== History ==
The school was founded in 1880 by the Glasgow Girls School Company, which appointed the self-taught Georgina Kinnear to develop a school as she saw fit. One of the first pupils was Margaret Paulin Young who rose to become Head Girl. She returned to teach and was groomed by Georgina Kinnear to take her place. Under Young's leadership, the school it continued to grow, developing separate classes for art and science.

In 1929, Margaret Paulin Young retired and Janie Robertson became the head of Park School. She was born in Dumfries in 1879 and was a masters graduate of Edinburgh University. She had been head of maths and second mistress. She was religious and she could recite parts of the bible from memory. She was active in the church and the Girl Guides. She led the school until 1944 and died in 1957.

In 1976, with a declining need for girls' schools in the west end of Glasgow, the governors of the school agreed to share finances with two other nearby girls' schools.

Due to falling enrolments, Park School merged with Laurel Bank school in 1996, creating Laurel Park School. The Park School premises on Lynedoch Street were sold and converted into luxury flats, while Laurel Park School occupied the former Laurel Bank School premises on Lilybank Terrace in Hillhead. Laurel Park School for girls closed in 2002, and pupils transferred to Hutchesons' Grammar School.

Alumni includes: Margaret Paulin Young, Siobhan Redmond and Catherine Carswell.

== Laurel Bank School ==
Laurel Bank had been formed in 1903 by Margaret Hannan Watson and Janet Spens who were graduates of St Andrews and Glasgow University. Spens left Watson in charge when she left in 1908. It had distinctive green uniforms. It had also had some notable pupils. One early pupil had read "Scouting for Boys" and with five other students they formed the "Cuckoo Patrol" which was a precursor of the Girl Guides. Allison Greenlees was Scotland's first Girl Guide in 1909. A notable and "immortal" staff member was Agnes Raeburn who taught art at Laurel Bank. Later alumni include the journalists Sally Magnusson and Laura Kuenssberg, Ann Paton, Lady Paton, the pacifist Helen Steven and Janet Hendry one of the pioneers of Scottish aviation and the first woman pilot in Scotland.
