= Thomas Kinnear =

Scottish banker (1796–1830)

not to be confused with Grace Marks' employer who died in 1843

Thomas Kinnear FRSE (1796–1830) was a Scottish banker and Director of T. Kinnear & Sons. He was also a Director of the Bank of Scotland.

== Life ==
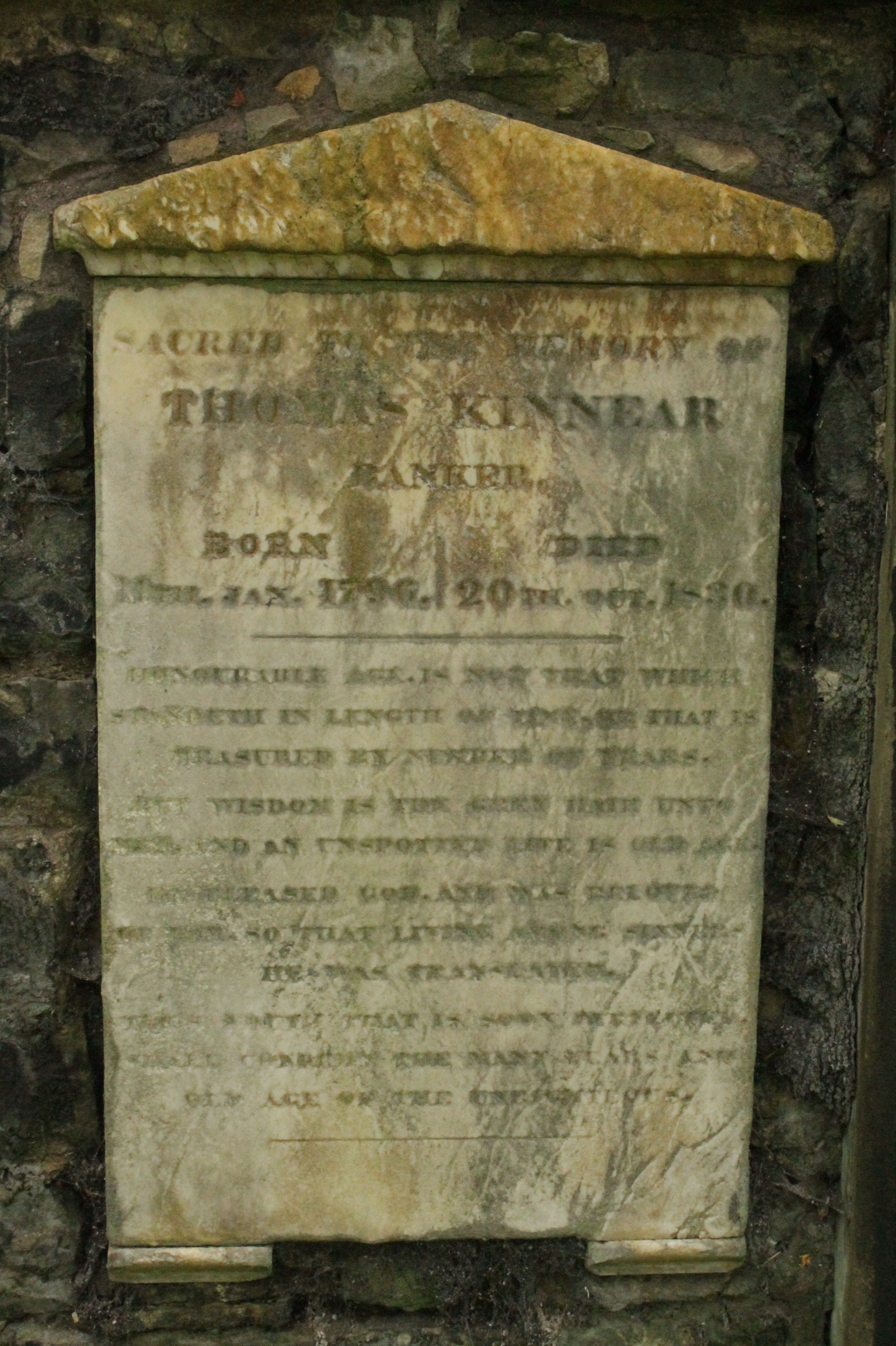
The grave of Thomas Kinnear, St John's churchyard, Edinburgh

He was born on 11 January 1796.

His father was Charles Kinnear, an agriculturalist in Fife. His grandfather Thomas Kinnear was also a banker and founded T. Kinnear and Sons in 1748. Kinnear’s was one of the few Scottish banks to survive the crisis of 1772.

His company had premises at 9 Royal Exchange in Edinburgh.

He was elected a Fellow of the Royal Society of Edinburgh in 1820, his proposer being Thomas Allan.

He died on 20 October 1830. He is buried at a south facing wall of the lower terrace of St John's churchyard on Princes Street.

After his death his widow is listed as living at 44 Melville Street in Edinburgh’s West End.

The National Archives in Kew hold a copy of his will, dated 21 February 1831. After his death his firm amalgamated with Donald Smith and Son to form Kinnear, Smith and Company (1831). Smith had been Lord Provost of Edinburgh 1807-08. Due to mismanagement of funds this company failed disastrously in 1833/4, leaving debts of £320,000.

== Family ==
His daughter Jean Kinnear (1772-1838) married Rev John Campbell minister of Tolbooth parish, St Giles who was Moderator of the General Assembly of the Church of Scotland in 1818.

His nephew was the lawyer James Kinnear.
