= George James Cowley-Brown =

- Born: July 2, 1832
- Died: December 17, 1924 (aged 92)
- Education: Christ Church, Oxford
- Occupations: Clergyman and author
- Spouse(s): Isabel Cowley-Brown, née Tottenham
- Children: 2 sons, 3 daughters
- Parent: George Francis Cowley-Brown
- Religion: Anglican
- Church: Church of England and; Scottish Episcopal Church
- Ordained: 1855 (deacon); 1858 (priest)
- Offices held: Rector of Shipton-on-Cherwell; Rector of Buckhorn-Weston; Rector of St Edmund's, Salisbury; Rector of St John's, Edinburgh
- Title: The Reverend Canon

George James Cowley-Brown, M.A. (1832–1924) was an Anglican clergyman and author who served in both the Church of England and the Scottish Episcopal Church.

== Life ==
The eldest son of George Francis Brown, he was educated at Christ Church, Oxford, where awarded a Bachelor of Arts degree in 1854 and a Master of Arts degree in 1857.

He was ordained in the Anglican ministry as a deacon in 1855 and a priest in 1858. He served as a curate at Bladon-cum-Woodstock, Oxfordshire, 1855–1867; during which time he became domestic chaplain to the Duke of Marlborough in 1858. His next three appointments were Rector of Shipton-on-Cherwell, Oxfordshire, 1867–1874; Rector of Buckhorn-Weston, Dorset, 1874–77; and Rector of St Edmund's, Salisbury, Wiltshire, 1877–83. He became Rector of St John's, Edinburgh in 1883 and a canon of St Mary's Cathedral, Edinburgh in 1898. He retired in 1909. He lived at 9 Grosvenor Street in the western part of the city.

He married Isabel Tottenham and had two sons: Horace Wyndham Cowley-Brown and John Stapleton Cowley-Brown, who both became authors. He had three daughters, all of whom died before the age of twenty-two: Isabel Katharine (d. June 8 1894, age 21), Mary Verena (d. August 18 1887, age 11), and Edith Caledon (d. June 20 1894, age 3 and 10 mo.). George's wife Isabel died just months before her two surviving daughters on April 7 1894.

== Works ==
He published a number of works:

- Lectures on the Gospel according to St. John (1863)
- A Short Apology for the Book of Common Prayer (1873)
- Daily Lessons on the Life of Our Lord, two volumes (1880)
- Prayers for a Household from Old Divines (1st edition 1881; 2nd edition 1897; 3rd edition 1907)
- Some Reason for Believing Christianity to be True (1897)
- Via Media (reprinted from the National Review) (1898)
- Verselets and Versions (1911)
