= James Kinnear =

Scottish lawyer

James Kinnear WS FRSE (1810–1849) was a Scottish lawyer. His legal title was Master Extraordinary in Chancery and Commissioner of English Affairs.

== Life ==
He was born on 2 December 1810 and lived at 31 Queen Street in the New Town.

He was apprenticed as a lawyer to Richard Mackenzie WS at 12 Thistle Street, close to his family home, around 1825. The office later transferred to William Sharp WS at the same address (presumably on the death of Mackenzie). He qualified as a Writer to the Signet in 1832 and thereafter set up his own premises at 81 George Street, a fairly prestigious address in the city centre and far grander than his previous employer's premises. At this time he was living at 9 Doune Terrace on the Moray Estate on the west side of Edinburgh. In 1841 he was elected a Fellow of the Royal Society of Edinburgh. His proposer was George Augustus Borthwick.

In later life he lived at 35 Queen Street, a few doors from his childhood home. He also owned a villa at Stove, on Sanday, Orkney, close to his wife's childhood home.

He died on 21 June 1849 in Cádiz whilst touring in Spain. A memorial to his memory stands in St Cuthbert's Churchyard in Edinburgh.

== Family ==
He was married to Mary Henrietta Balfour (1809-1871) in February 1832. She was the eldest daughter of Captain William Balfour RN of Trenaby in Orkney. They had seven children including George Thomas Balfour Kinnear (1833-1915) and William Balfour Kinnear (1838-1871).

His older brother John Gardner Kinnear (1800-1866) followed in his father's footsteps as a banker. He was also a Fellow of the Royal Society of Edinburgh serving as Treasurer to the Society 1833/4. He died at La Belle Place in Glasgow on 19 December 1866. John married Mary Smith. Their son Alexander became Alexander Kinnear, 1st Baron Kinnear.
