= Susan Hamilton (soprano) =

Scottish soprano

Susan Hamilton (born 1970) is a Scottish soprano focusing on Baroque and Contemporary music

Her earliest musical education was as a chorister at St Mary's Episcopal Cathedral in Edinburgh where she was one of the first girl choristers and as a pupil at St Mary's Music School in Edinburgh.

Susan performs at major international festivals and has worked with conductors such as Sir John Eliot Gardiner, Philippe Herreweghe, Paul McCreesh, Rafael Frühbeck de Burgos and Ton Koopman; Composers such as Fabian Fiorini, Ronald Stevenson, Pascal Dusapin, Witold Lutoslawski and Peter Nelson. Along with Ben Parry she was co-founder and formerly artistic director of the Dunedin Consort. Susan recently co-founded a new ensemble on the Scottish cultural scene, Laudonia.
