= George Inglis =

George Inglis may refer to:

- George Inglis (footballer), footballer for Southampton St. Mary's F.C.
- George Henry Inglis (1902–1979), British Army officer
