= Philip Crosfield =

Scottish Anglican priest

George Philip Chorley Crosfield OBE (9 September 1924 – 13 March 2013) was an eminent Anglican priest in the latter part of the 20th century.

He was born on 9 September 1924 and educated at George Watson's College, Edinburgh and Selwyn College, Cambridge.

After wartime service with the Royal Artillery, during which he saw action in Normandy in 1944, Germany in 1945 and was then posted to India, he was ordained in 1952 and began his career with a curacy at St David's, Pilton, Edinburgh and subsequently at St. Andrew's Church, St. Andrews, where he was also Anglican chaplain to the university. It was here that he met his wife, Susan Martin, an undergraduate who was president of the Anglican Society.

He was appointed Rector of St Cuthbert's, Hawick in 1955 and he and Susan were married in the summer of 1956. After 5 years, Crosfield was asked to be Chaplain of Gordonstoun School and his appointment coincided with the arrival at the school of the young Prince Charles, whom he later prepared for confirmation.

In 1968, he was appointed Vice-Provost and Canon Residentiary at St Mary's Cathedral, Edinburgh, but, following Patrick Rodger's departure to be Bishop of Manchester, he became its Provost in 1970, a post he was to hold until retirement 20 years later. During his time at the cathedral, he founded St. Mary's Music School, which had grown out of the St. Mary's Cathedral Choir School. The Music School opened its doors in 1972, with Yehudi Menuhin as its patron.

Crosfield was a member of the Board of Governors of Lendrick Muir School, a special residential school for maladjusted children (mainly boys) aged 11-19.

In the 1980s, horrified by the effects of unemployment on young people, Crosfield set up the St. Mary's Cathedral Workshop, which has looked after the fabric of the Victorian Cathedral whilst training apprentice stonemasons and reviving the skills and trades associated with old buildings that were in danger of disappearing.

Moving to Penicuik, near Edinburgh, in retirement, he continued his work as a priest as part of the Ministry Team of St. James the Less Episcopal Church.

Religious titles
Preceded by Patrick Campbell Rodger	Provost of St Mary’s Cathedral, Edinburgh; 1970 – 1990	Succeeded by Graham John Thompson Forbes
