= Daphne Foskett =

English art writer (1911–1998)

Daphne Foskett FRSA
- Born: Daphne Kirk; 23 December 1911; Shoddesden, Kimpton, Hampshire, England
- Died: 15 June 1998 (aged 86); Solihull, Warwickshire, England
- Citizenship: British
- Occupations: Art connoisseur; Art writer
- Spouse: Reginald Foskett (m. 1937; died 1973)
- Children: 2

Daphne Foskett FRSA (née Kirk; 23 December 1911 – 15 June 1998) was an English art connoisseur and art writer. She became interested in portrait miniatures while living in Edinburgh in the late 1950s and was encouraged to publish her research as her knowledge on the subject grew. Foskett published seven books and one exhibition catalogue during her career. She conducted lecture tours and was a contributor to some periodicals. Foskett's large photographic archive was sent to the Scottish National Portrait Gallery on a long-term loan in 2003 and her miniatures were catalogued in the same year.

== Early life ==
Foskett was born at Shoddesden, Kimpton, Hampshire on 23 December 1911. She was the daughter of the Duke of Cornwall's Light Infantry captain John William Carnegie Kirk and his wife, Agnes Maud Haynes, née Kirk. Foskett was of Scottish ancestry through her paternal grandfather, John Kirk, the botanist and physician. She grew up primarily in Sevenoaks, Kent, and was taught at the private St Ives School, Bexhill, Sussex, but did not have any formal qualifications when she left the school. Foskett was as a matron at a Kent preparatory school in the mid-1930s. She worked in the Nottinghamshire parishes of Rainworth from 1937 to 1943 before moving to Ordsall until 1947. Foskett later moved to work in Ilkeston, Derbyshire from 1948 to 1956. These years saw her get heavily involved with the Girl Guides, the Mothers' Union and the Young Wives.

== Career ==
While living in Edinburgh during the late 1950s, Foskett became interested in portrait miniatures, and assisted the miniatures dealer Arthur Tite at the annual Grosvenor House art fair. As her knowledge on the subject grew, she was encouraged to publish her research, and published British Portrait Miniatures: A History in 1963. Foskett followed with the first monograph on the 18th-century miniaturist John Smart the following year. As with several other researchers, she misidentified Smart's place of birth as Norfolk when he was born in Soho. In 1965, the Scottish committee of the Arts Council invited her to curate the coinciding Edinburgh International Festival exhibition 'British Portrait Miniatures' at Rothesay Terrace. Foskett was appointed a governor of St. Anne's School, Windermere in 1971.

The next year, she authored the two-volume A Dictionary of British Miniature Painters containing biographical information on more than 4,500 portrait miniaturists. Foskett published two monographs and an exhibition catalogue in Samuel Cooper, 1609–1672, John Harden of Brathay Hall, 1772–1847 and Samuel Cooper and His Contemporaries. She republished A Dictionary of British Miniature Painters together with a new edition of Collecting Miniatures to compile the single-volume Miniatures: Dictionary and Guide in 1979. In 1981, Foskett wrote her eighth piece of work, Elizabethan Miniatures. She was a consultant on the 'Artists of the Tudor Court' exhibition at the Victoria and Albert Museum in 1983 and authored an unpublished but completed manuscript on a major period of the portrait miniature.

In 1987, Foskett's final book, Miniatures: Dictionary and Guide, was published for the Antique Collectors' Club in Woodbridge, Suffolk, and was made an Honorary Member of the Royal Miniature Society. She contributed to the periodicals Antique Dealer, Apollo, Collector's Guide and The Connoisseur. Foskett was a Fellow of the Royal Society of Arts, and was a member of the Royal Over-Seas League and Theta Sigma Phi. She went on lecture tours to London and the United States, and built up a large photographic archive as well as conducting international correspondence on a wide scale. In 1990, the artist Heather O. Catchpole made a watercolour on ivorine portrait miniature of Foskett.

== Personal life ==
Foskett was a member of the Church of England. She was married to the curate and bishop Reginald Foskett from 7 April 1937 until his death in 1973. They had two daughters. She died in the Solihull Parkway Hospital on 15 June 1998.

== Legacy ==
According to Stephen Lloyd in Foskett's Dictionary of National Biography entry and obituary in The Scotsman, she had succeeded in bringing portrait miniatures closer to art collectors, art connoisseurs and the general public. Following her death, her photographic archive and much of her art collection was placed on long-term loan at the Scottish National Portrait Gallery, Edinburgh in 2003. Her miniatures were catalogued in the same year, as well as the watercolour portrait of Foskett being presented to the Scottish National Portrait Gallery.
