= General Inglis =

General Inglis may refer to:

- George Henry Inglis, (1902–1979), British Army major general
- John C. Inglis (fl. 1970s–2020s), U.S. Air National Guard brigadier general
- John Eardley Inglis (1814–1862), British Army major general
- William Inglis (British Army officer) (1764–1835), British Army lieutenant general

== See also ==
- Harry C. Ingles (1888–1976), U.S. Army major general
