= John Wilson (Scottish priest) =

Scottish Episcopalian minister

John Skinner Wilson (5 January 1849, Fyvie – 11 November 1926, Strathtay) was an eminent Episcopalian minister in the first quarter of the twentieth century.

John Skinner Wilson was born in 1849 and educated at Trinity College, Glenalmond and St Catharine's College, Cambridge. He was ordained in 1873 and was Rector of St George's, Edinburgh after which he was appointed Provost of St Mary's Cathedral, Edinburgh in 1897, a post he held until he died on 11 November 1926.

Religious titles
Preceded by James Francis Montgomery	Provost of St Mary’s Cathedral, Edinburgh; 1897 – 1919	Succeeded by Edward Lowry Henderson
