= Hector Gooderham =

Scottish Episcopalian priest

Hector Bransby Gooderham (11 October 1909 – 30 December 1977) was an eminent Episcopalian priest in the third quarter of the 20th Century.

He was born on 11 October 1901 and educated at George Heriot's School, Edinburgh and the city's University. He was ordained in 1924 and began his career with a curacy at St. Mary's Cathedral, Glasgow after which he was appointed Rector of St John's, Selkirk. Subsequently, the incumbent at St Baldred's, North Berwick he was appointed Provost of St Mary's Cathedral, Edinburgh in 1949, a post he was to hold until 1956. His last appointment before retirement was at St Peter's, Cranley Gardens, London and he died on 30 December 1977.

Religious titles
Preceded by Ivor Erskine St Clair Ramsay	Provost of St Mary’s Cathedral, Edinburgh; 1949 – 1956	Succeeded by Reginald Foskett
