= Ivor Ramsay =

Scottish priest

Ivor Erskine St Clair Ramsay (1 November 1902 – 22 January 1956) was a Scottish Anglican priest in the middle part of the 20th century.

He was born on 1 November 1902 and educated at Ardvreck School, Uppingham School and Glasgow University. He was ordained in 1925 and began his career with a curacy at St Paul's Cathedral, Dundee. In 1931 he became a Novice of the College of the Resurrection, Mirfield and the following year Chaplain of the Home of St Francis, Dunfermline. He then held incumbencies at St John's Church, Jedburgh, Christ Church, Falkirk and St Andrew's, Dunmore before being appointed Provost of St Mary's Cathedral, Edinburgh. In 1949 he was appointed Dean of King's College, Cambridge, a post he held until January 1956 when he jumped to his death from the roof of King's College Chapel while reportedly suffering from depression. He was succeeded at King's by Dr. Alec Vidler.

Religious titles
Preceded by David Colin Dunlop	Provost of St Mary’s Cathedral, Edinburgh; 1944 – 1949	Succeeded by Hector Bransby Gooderham
