= Helen MacLeod =

Scottish harp player

- Born: 1 December 1980; Skye
- Died: 23 July 2018 (aged 37)
- Instrument: Harp

Helen MacLeod (1 December 1980 - 23 July 2018) was a Scottish harp player.

== Life ==
Helen was born on Skye on 1 December 1980 to Roddy and Dolores Macleod. Her father was a native Gaelic speaker, and she grew up in Inverinate on the shore of Loch Duich.

She was first taught clarsach by Christine Martin, and then continued to study the clarsach and pedal harp at St Mary's Music School in Edinburgh. She learned the piano for a time as well, and was interested in Scottish and classical playing.

Helen then went to the Royal Northern College of Music in Manchester, and studied with Welsh harpist Eira Lynn Jones before graduating in 2003.

She had a varied career, working with the Royal Scottish National Orchestra, the Scottish Chamber Orchestra and the Hallé Orchestra among others. She formed a duo Hoot in 2005 with flautist Emma Wilkins, and they released an album Garden of Adonis on 2010. Between 2009 and 2018 she taught at St Mary's Music School in Edinburgh.

She died in a car accident on 23 July 2018.
