= St Mary's Music School =

Coordinates: 55°56′50″N 3°13′14″W

Location
- 25 Grosvenor Crescent; Edinburgh, EH12 5EL; Scotland

Information
- Type: Independent day and boarding Specialist music school
- Established: 1880
- Headteacher: Kenneth Taylor
- Director of Music: John Cameron
- Gender: Coeducational
- Age: 9 to 19
- Enrolment: 80 (2017)
- Website: https://www.stmarysmusicschool.co.uk/

St Mary's Music School is a music school in Scotland in the West End of Edinburgh, for children aged 9 to 19 and is also the Choir School of St Mary's Episcopal Cathedral. The school, which is non-denominational, provides education for children with a special talent in music, and is Scotland's only full-time independent specialist music school. In 2023, the school had 64 pupils from many different backgrounds coming from all parts of Scotland, the rest of the UK and abroad.

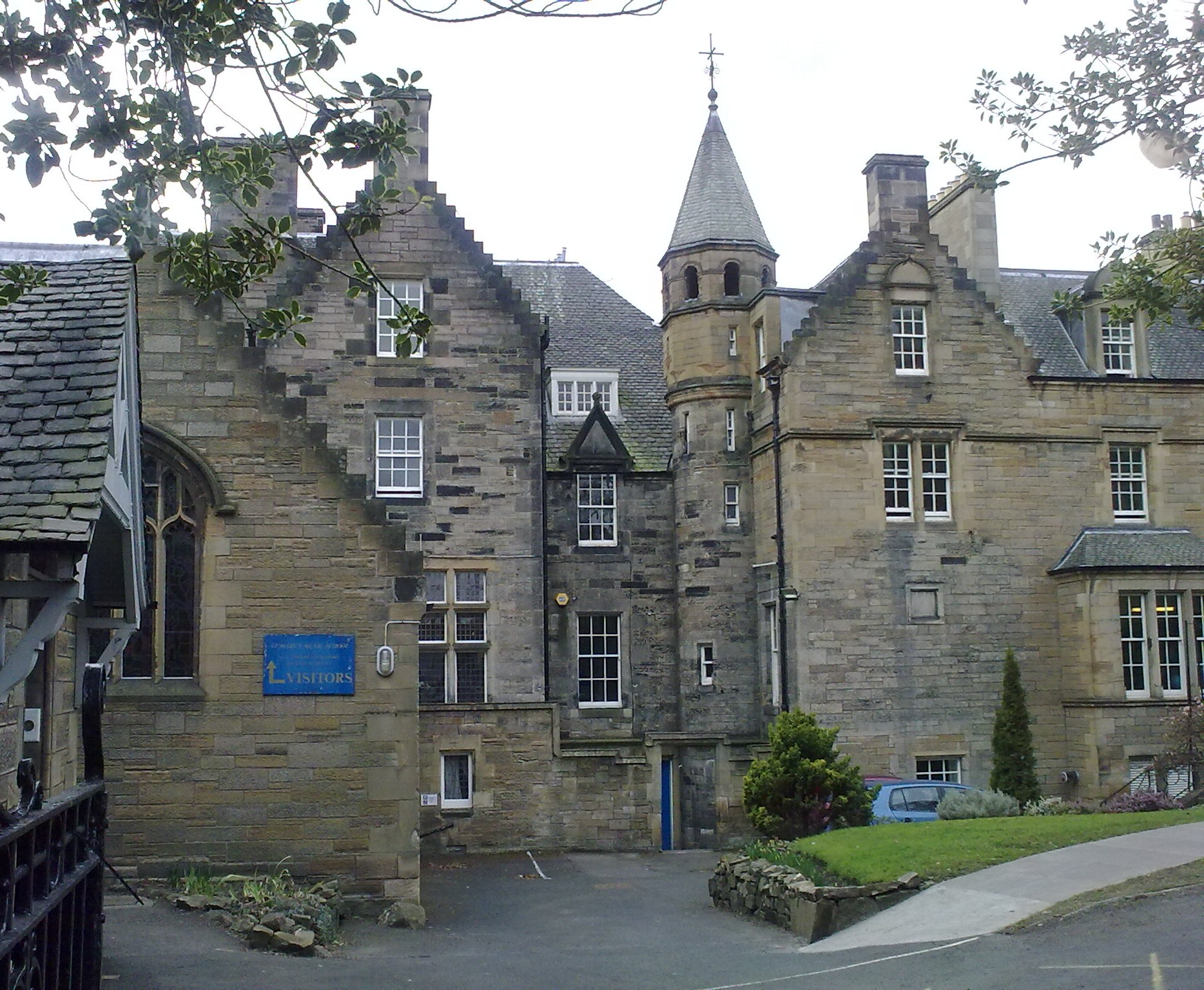

== Entrance ==
Entry to the school is by audition and assessment, based on musical ability and potential and regardless of personal circumstances. Scottish Government funding, up to 100%, is available through the statutory Aided Places scheme to assist with the cost of tuition and boarding fees. The school and St Mary's Cathedral also award bursaries.

== Performance ==
The school operates a large chamber orchestra, a junior string sinfonia and a senior string ensemble. Jazz and traditional Scottish music (including instruments like the clàrsach and bagpipes) feature in specialist ensembles and in Jazz and Scottish Music Days. Students perform regularly throughout Edinburgh and beyond. In addition to internal lunchtime concerts, students have also performed at the Queen's Hall, Edinburgh, Jam House, Kirks, Cathedral and the Royal Conservatoire of Scotland in Glasgow. Students have also been requested to play at many civic occasions including Royalty, the Scottish Parliament and other public events such as a NATO visit to Edinburgh.

== Academics ==
The school day is from 8:30 am until 5:00 pm (3:30 on Wednesdays and 4:30 on Fridays).

St Mary's Music School was named as Scottish Independent Secondary School of the Year in 2007 The 2016 pass rate was 100% for National 4, Higher and A level exams, 94% for National 5 and 95% for Advanced Highers. A former music director, Nigel Murray, wrote in 1994 that the self-discipline acquired in the devotion to the mastery of an art as self-fulfilling as music was bound to have a beneficial effect on the rest of the pupil's work and play. Murray continued that if he had a motto for St Mary's Music School it would be the words of the Italian pianist Ferruccio Busoni, "He who is only a musician is no musician".

== History ==
St Mary's Music School was founded as the Song School of St Mary's Episcopal Cathedral in 1880 to educate choristers for the newly built St Mary's Episcopal Cathedral. At that time the school was located at Old Coates House and the adjacent Song School Building, both within the Cathedral precincts.

In 1970 Dennis Townhill and the Provost, Philip Crosfield, became the driving force of a plan not only to safeguard the future of the Choir School of St Mary's Cathedral, Edinburgh but to transform it into a new and vibrant entity. In 1972 the school was expanded into a specialist music school on the lines of the Yehudi Menuhin School, with Lord Menuhin becoming patron and referring to it as "my younger sister-school in Scotland". The school educates young instrumentalists, composers and singers. In 1976 the Cathedral choir was opened to girls. In 1995, the music school moved out of the Cathedral grounds and into its current location at Coates Hall, Grosvenor Crescent, Edinburgh.

St Mary's Music School is the only Scottish member of the UK Music and Dance Schools (MDS) and is similar to other specialist music schools throughout Europe such as the Dresden Music Gymnasium; Sächsisches Landesgymnasium für Musik "Carl Maria von Weber". The current president is John Wallace, a trumpet player and former principal of the Royal Scottish Academy of Music and Drama. Vice presidents are Evelyn Glennie, Steven Isserlis, James MacMillan, Jerzy Maksymiuk and Steven Osborne.

In 2019, the school received a new Steinway piano, gifted from fundraising by the charitable trust of the Witherby Publishing Group.

== Location ==
Coates Hall was originally designed by David Bryce for Sheriff Napier in 1850 as a small Baronial house. In 1891 the building was bought by the Scottish Episcopal Church for use as the Edinburgh Theological College and enlarged by Sydney Mitchell adding a late gothic chapel. In 1913 Robert Lorimer added a storey to the main block.

In 1995 Coates Hall was sold to St Mary's Music School and houses the (de-consecrated) chapel which is used for concerts. The chapel contains three stained glass windows. by Ninian Comper which includes Scotland's first saints, St Columba and St Ninian. The school also has two libraries, staff offices, bedrooms for boarding pupils, and 25 music practice rooms. Academic subjects are mainly taught in two 20th-century buildings within the school grounds.

The school is surrounded by gardens in the heart of Edinburgh's West End and has excellent transport connections due to its proximity to Haymarket railway station and connecting bus and tram links.

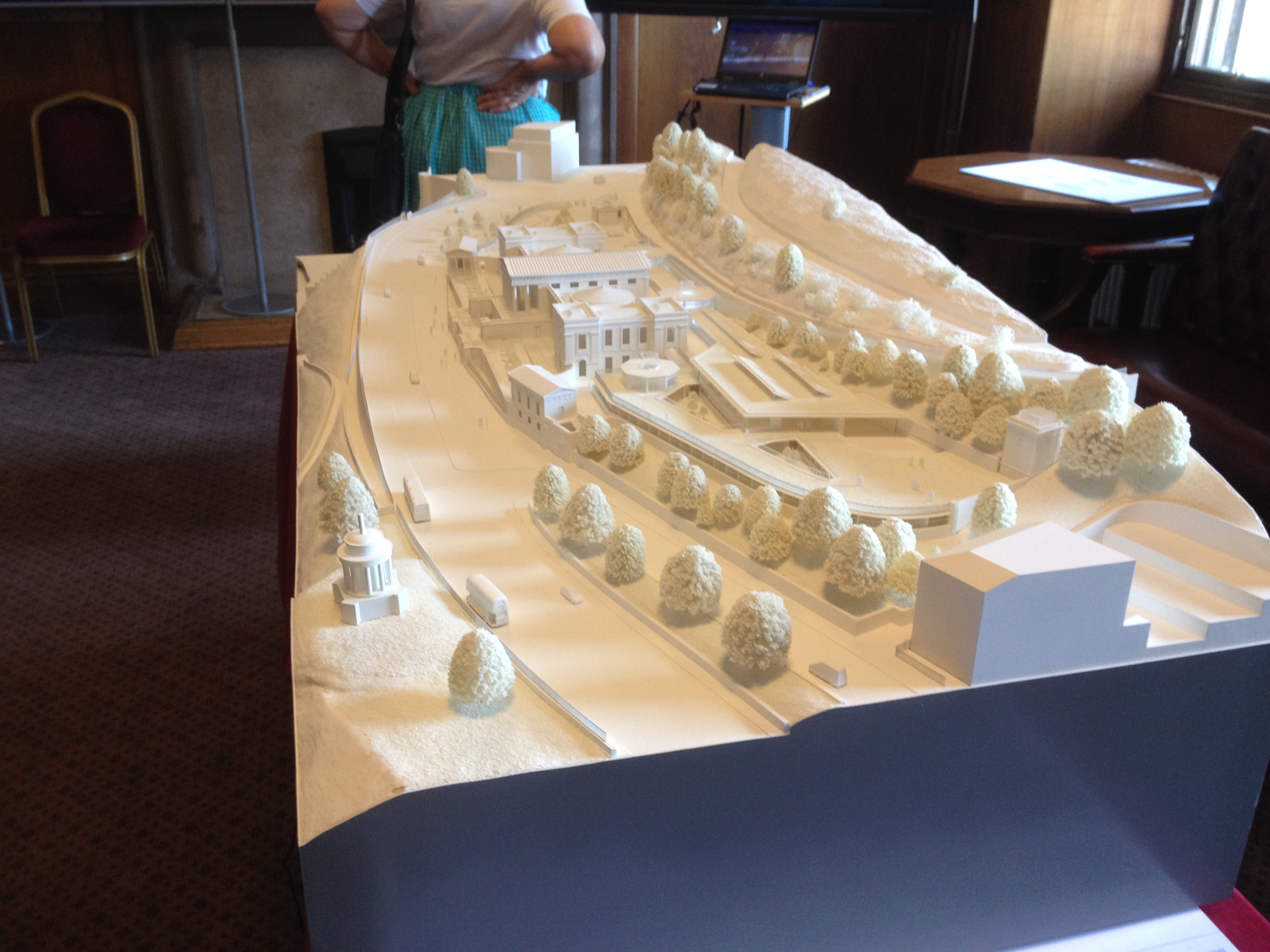
Model in 2016 of proposed new building for school

The Song School within the nearby Cathedral precinct is still used by the choristers for daily practice, where they are surrounded by murals by Phoebe Anna Traquair. It was these murals (1888–1892) which won Traquair national recognition. Within a tunnelled ceiling interior the east wall depicts the cathedral clergy and choir. The south depicts Traquair's admired contemporaries such as Dante Gabriel Rossetti, William Holman Hunt, and George Frederic Watts; the north, birds and choristers sing together. The west shows the four beasts singing the Sanctus.

=== Royal High School ===
In 2016 the school put forward a fully funded £25 million proposal to move its location to the old Royal High School in Edinburgh in competition with another proposal to convert the site to a hotel. The school's plans were accepted by the Edinburgh Council planning committee in 2016 and would have allowed the school to increase the number of its students. However, the council had previously signed a contract with Duddingston House Properties in 2012 to convert the Royal High into a hotel. Two hotel plans were rejected by the Edinburgh Council planning committee in 2015 and 2017. The St Mary's Music School obtained a 125-year lease from Edinburgh Council for £1.5 million so that plans could go ahead after the Council cancelled their agreement with Duddingston House Properties in January 2021.

== Notable alumni ==
- Alexander Armstrong – comedian, actor and presenter best known for The Armstrong and Miller Show
- Alan Benzie – pianist; winner, BBC Scotland Young Jazz Musician of the Year 2007, Billboard Award winner, Berklee College, Boston
- Monica Brett-Crowther – mezzo-soprano
- Brìghde Chaimbeul – bagpiper
- Daisy Chute – singer and member of All Angels
- Paul Galbraith – guitarist
- Helen Grime – oboist and composer
- Susan Hamilton – soprano
- David Horne – composer
- Ethan Loch – pianist and composer; the first blind person to attend the school.
- Helen MacLeod – harpist
- Steven Osborne – pianist
- Mike Peden – record producer
- Andrew Robb – Double Bass; winner, BBC Scotland Young Jazz Musician of the Year 2009
- Garry Walker – conductor

== See also ==
- Music schools
- Music schools in Scotland
