= Jules Molyneaux =

British mountaineer

- Born: 12 July 2008 (age 17)
- Citizenship: British
- Education: Ardvreck Preparatory School, Glenalmond College

Jules Molyneaux (born 12 July 2008) is a British mountaineer who became the youngest person to summit the Matterhorn at the age of 11.

== Early life and education ==
Molyneaux grew up in Highlands of Scotland. He attended Ardvreck Preparatory School, where he was introduced to outdoor education and climbing activities, and later continued his education at Glenalmond College (secondary level). He learned about early ascents of the mountain, including the 1861 expedition led by Edward Whymper, and the fear the peak historically inspired in communities living below it.

=== The Matterhorn ascent ===
In the year leading up to the ascent, Molyneaux undertook intensive physical training during the COVID-19 lockdown. On 8 July 2020, Molyneaux successfully summited the Matterhorn (4,478 metres / 14,692 feet) in Switzerland, becoming one of the youngest people to do so at age 11. Ardvreck's head (Ali Kinge) later described him as “an exceedingly determined boy” and noted the school's pride in his achievement. Molyneaux reached the summit in approximately four hours, with the descent taking another four hours.

== Recognition ==
The Matterhorn Museum and national newspapers confirmed that Molyneaux's ascent constituted a world record for age. On the same day as Molyneaux's ascent, a climber reportedly died after falling approximately 400 metres.
