= Hunter Farquharson =

Anglican priest

Hunter Buchanan Farquharson (born 1958), is a priest in the Scottish Episcopal Church, a province of the Anglican communion.

He was educated at the Birmingham School of Speech and Drama and Edinburgh Theological College.

He was ordained in 1989 and began his career as a curate in West Fife. He was rector of St Luke's, Glenrothes from 1991 to and then Rector of Holy Trinity, Dunfermline from then until 1999 when he became Provost of St Ninian's Cathedral, Perth, a post he retired from in July 2023, after 24 years.

Anglican Communion titles
Preceded by Kevin Franz	Provost of St Ninian's Cathedral, Perth; 1999–present	Incumbent
