= James Montgomery (priest) =

British priest (1818–1897)

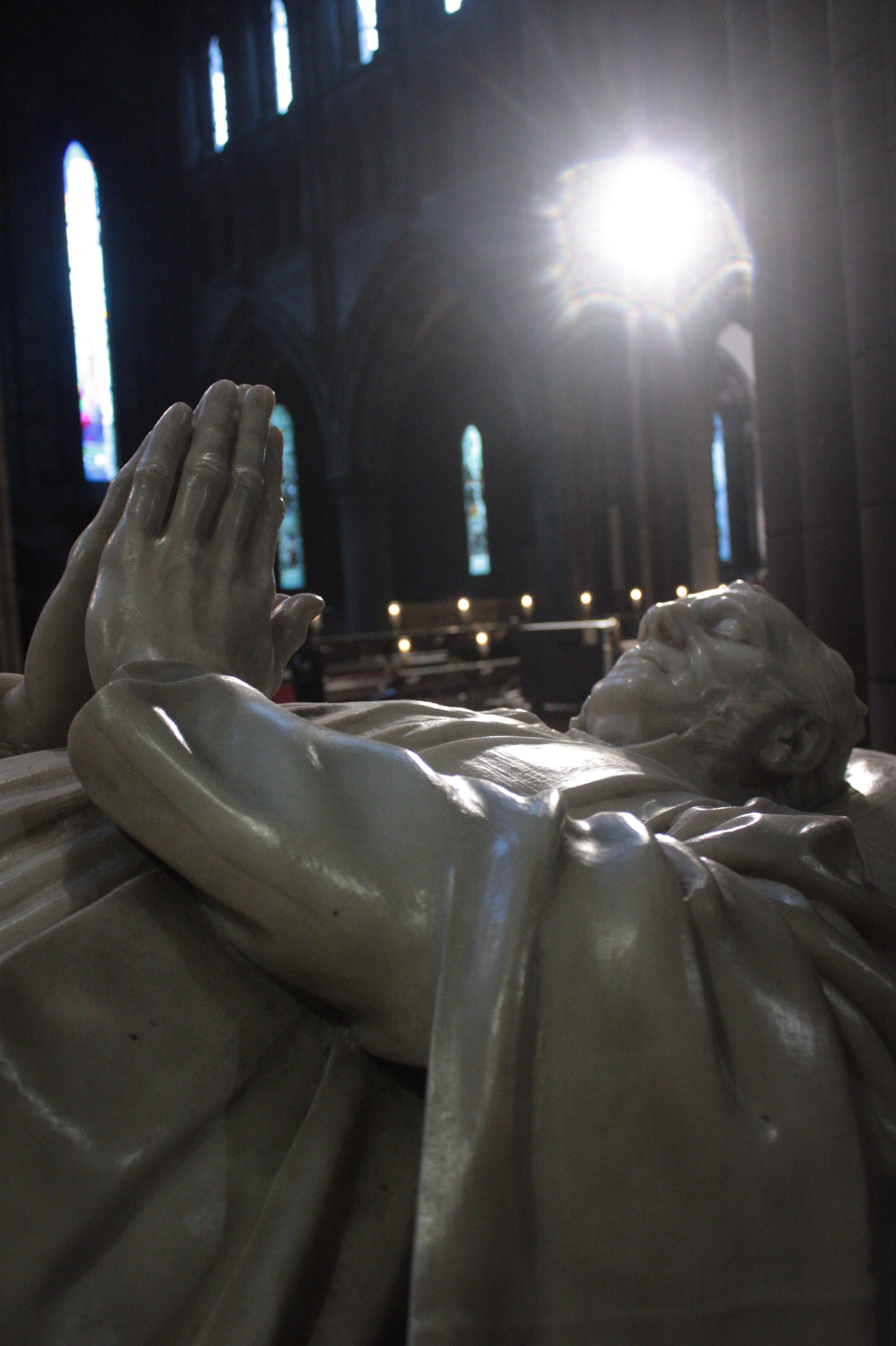
Effigy of Dean Montgomery in St Mary's Episcopal Cathedral in Edinburgh

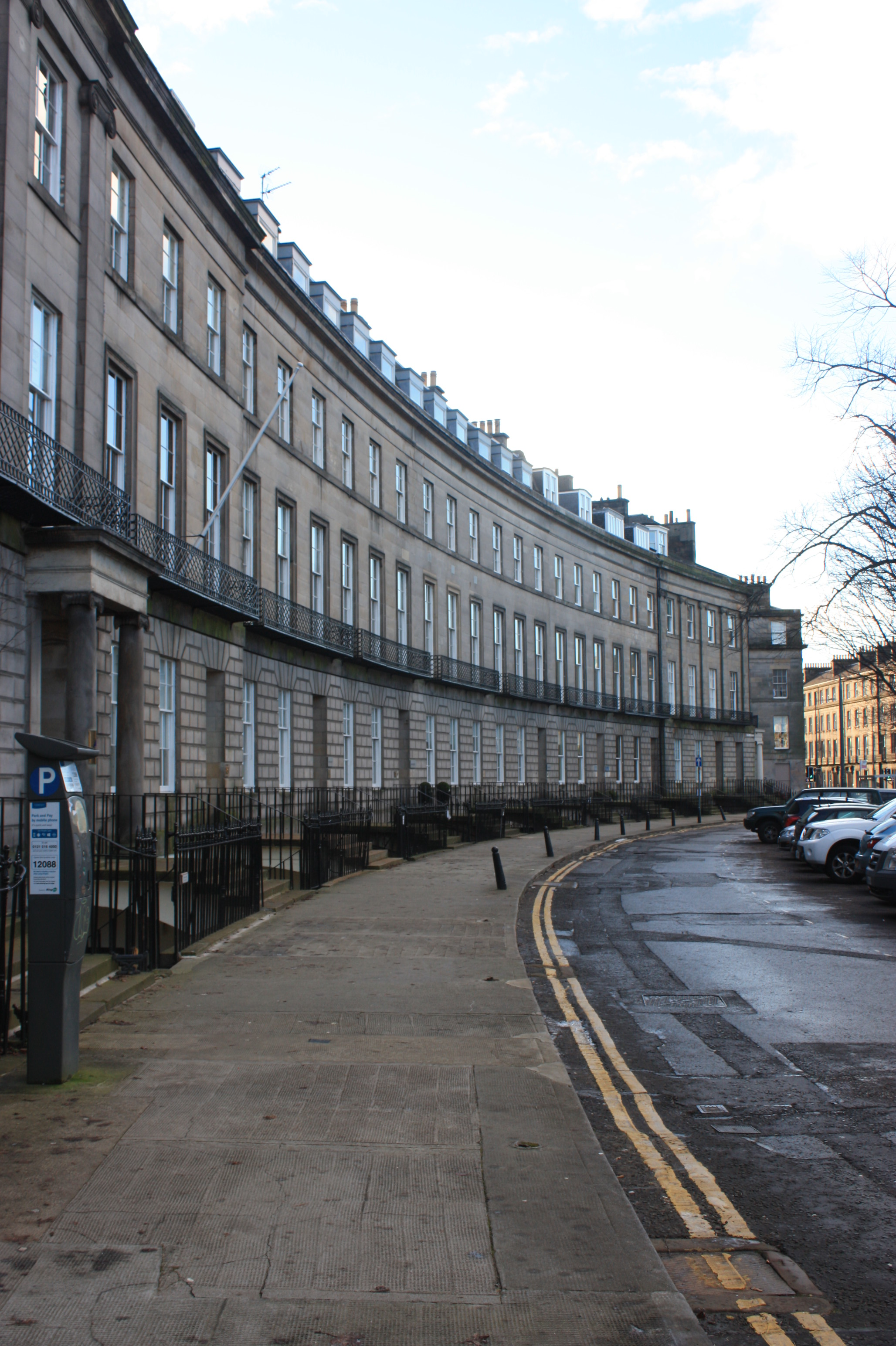
Atholl Crescent in Edinburgh

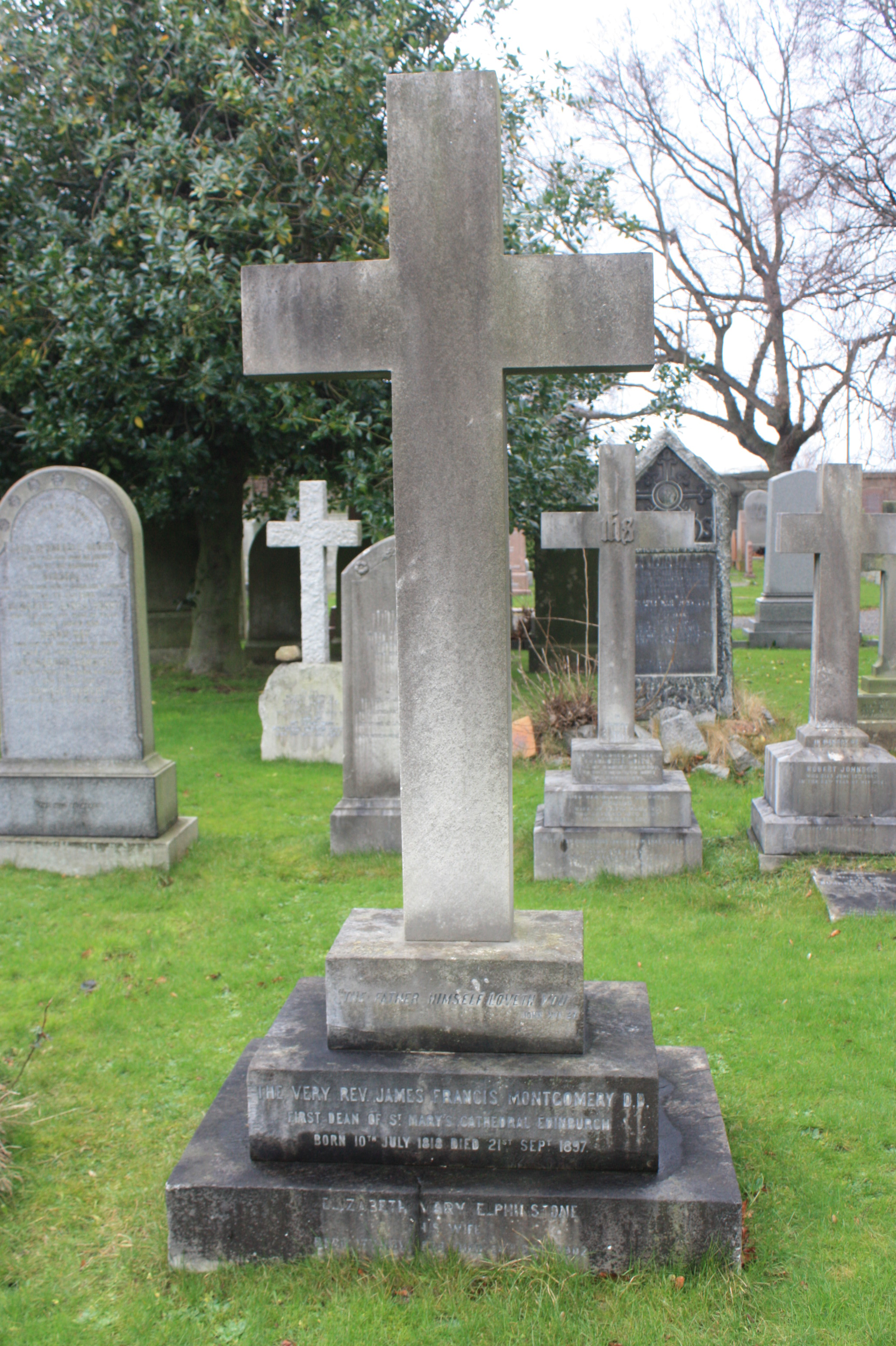
Dean Montgomery's grave, Dean Cemetery, Edinburgh

James Francis Montgomery FRSE (10 July 1818 – 21 September 1897) was trained as an Anglican priest and served as Dean in St Mary's Episcopal Cathedral in Edinburgh. He is usually referred to as Dean Montgomery. He was an early photographic pioneer and was one of the youngest members of the Edinburgh Calotype Club, one of the world's first photographic societies.

== Life ==
He was born on 10 July 1818, the son of Elizabeth Mason and Robert Montgomery, Lord Treasurers Remembrancer (younger son of Sir James William Montgomery). He would have spent much time in his early life at the family home of Stobo Castle.

He originally studied law and was admitted to the Scottish bar as an advocate in 1840. In the 1840s he is listed as an operational Edinburgh advocate working from 17 Atholl Crescent in the West End, living together with Robert Montgomery.

In the mid-1850s, he had a change of direction and studied divinity at Durham University, graduating with a BA in 1858 before being ordained, and serving as a curate at Puddletown. In 1858 he returned to Edinburgh to serve at St Paul's. He transferred to St Mary's Episcopal Cathedral in Edinburgh as a junior incumbent in 1864. He was appointed Dean of Edinburgh in 1873; and Provost of that St Mary's Episcopal Cathedral in Edinburgh in 1879.

In 1868, he was elected a fellow of the Royal Society of Edinburgh for his early photographic experiments, his proposer being Philip Kelland.

He lived close to the cathedral at 17 Atholl Crescent, a large townhouse in Edinburgh's West End.

He died at home on 21 September 1897 and is buried in the northern Victorian extension of Dean Cemetery. The grave lies in the south-west section facing onto the southern path.

== Memorials ==
A fine recumbent effigy of Montgomery exists on the north side of the choir stalls, sculpted by James Pittendrigh Macgillivray five years after his death (1902).

== Family ==
He married the Hon. Elizabeth Mary Elphinstone (1834-1902) on 17 January 1860. A brass plaque to her memory lies in the north aisle of St Mary's Episcopal Cathedral. They had no surviving children.

== Publications ==
- Words from the Cross (1864)
- My Walk with God (1883)

Religious titles
Preceded by Edward Bannerman Ramsay	Dean of Edinburgh; 1873 – 1897	Succeeded by John Skinner Wilson
Preceded by Inaugural appointment	Provost of St Mary’s Cathedral, Edinburgh; 1879 – 1897	Succeeded by John Skinner Wilson
