= Graham Forbes =

Scottish priest

The Very Reverend Graham Forbes CBE
- Provost of St Mary's Cathedral, Edinburgh
- Church: Scottish Episcopal Church
- Diocese: Diocese of Edinburgh
- In office: 1990 to present
- Other post: Provost of St Ninian's Cathedral, Perth (1982–1990)

Orders
- Ordination: 1976

Personal details
- Born: Graham John Thomson Forbes; 10 June 1951 (age 75)

Graham John Thomson Forbes, CBE is a priest of the Scottish Episcopal Church. He was Provost of St Mary's Cathedral, Edinburgh from 1990 until June 2017.

He was born on 10 June 1951 and educated at George Heriot's School, Edinburgh and the University of Aberdeen. and the University of Edinburgh. Ordained in 1976, he was a Curate at Old Saint Paul's, Edinburgh after which he was appointed Provost of St Ninian's Cathedral, Perth in 1982.

== Current appointments ==
Forbes is currently Chair of OSCR (Office of the Scottish Charity Regulator) and Chair of Court, Edinburgh Napier University. He also serves on the Armed Forces Pay Review Body and the Security Vetting Appeals Panel. In addition he is the Honorary Consul of Portugal in Edinburgh.

== Previous appointments ==
Forbes' previous appointments include HM (lay) Inspector of Constabulary; the General Medical Council; the Scottish Consumer Council; the Parole Board of Scotland; the Scottish Board of the Royal College of Anaesthetists; the Scottish Community Education Council, the Mental Welfare Commission for Scotland, and the Edinburgh Board of Manpower Services Commission. He is an Honorary Doctor of Napier University. He chaired the Scottish Executive's Expert Group on MMR. In January 2002, he became chairman of the board of the Scottish Criminal Cases Review Commission (SCCRC), having been a board member since its inception in 1999. He ceased to be a member on 31 December 2008, having served the maximum period permitted by statute.

He was appointed a CBE in 2003 for public service in Scotland.

Religious titles
Preceded by Alfred Ian Watt	Provost of St Ninian’s Cathedral, Perth; 1982 –1990	Succeeded by Kevin Gerhard Franz
Preceded by George Philip Chorley Crosfield	Provost of St Mary’s Cathedral, Edinburgh; 1990 –	Succeeded by Current Incumbent
