= St Mary Magdalene, Bailgate, Lincoln =

St Mary Magdalene, Bailgate
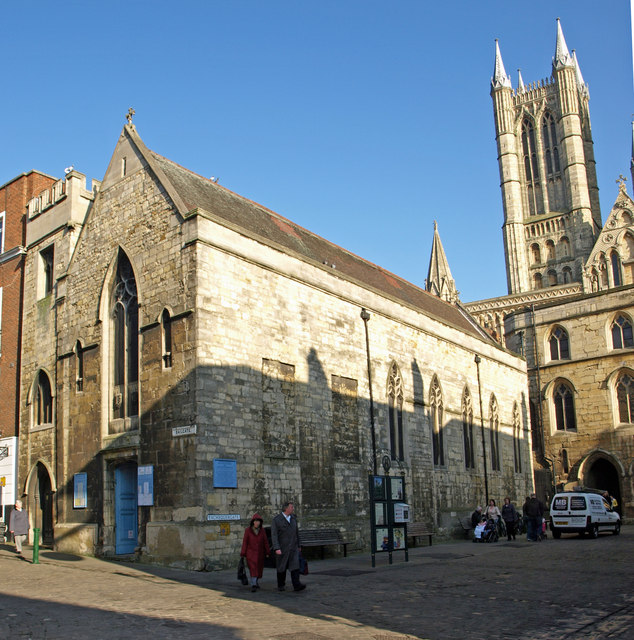
- St Mary Magdalene, Bailgate
- 53.234486°N 0.538288°W
- OS grid reference: SK 97659 71824
- Country: England
- Denomination: Church of England
- Churchmanship: Broad Church
- Website: stmarym.org.uk

History
- Status: In use

Architecture
- Heritage designation: Grade II listed
- Completed: 1695

Administration
- Diocese: Diocese of Lincoln
- Archdeaconry: Lincoln
- Parish: Lincoln St Mary Magdalene

St Mary Magdalene, Bailgate, is a Grade II listed parish church in Lincoln, England. It is dedicated to Jesus' companion, Mary Magdalene.

== History ==
The church stands in the Exchequer near the site of an Anglo-Saxon church, St Mary's, (which is believed to be under the present cathedral building) mentioned in the Domesday book. The current building dates from the late twelfth/early thirteenth century, was opened in 1317 and was rebuilt in 1695, following damage by the Parliamentary forces in 1644. In 1882 George Frederick Bodley undertook some remodelling work including a chancel screen and organ case.

== Incumbents ==
VICAR

- ? Geoffrey de Whicham - Chaplain
- 1250 Godred - [previously chaplain]

RECTOR

- 1275 John de North Leverton
- 1293 William de Blighburgh
- 1305 William de Harpeswelle [capalanus]
- John de Bolun alias Bohun
- 1322 Richard de Hilletoft
- 1340 Ranulfus de Harrington
- John Branspath (qui obit 1376)
- John de Searle
- 1384 Walter de de Windesore
- 1403 Robert de Hoggesthorpe
- 1406 William Skaytt
- 1422 Robert Gylman
- 1453 John Walpole
- 1456 William Kirksgarth
- 1461 John Sharpe
- 1468 John Waltham
- 1484 William Skelton
- 1492 Henry Farley
- 1520 Thomas Willson
- 1522 Nicholas Bayte
- 1527 John Cook, Walter Ireland, Robert Kelsey
- 1529 Christopher Massinberd
- 1552 Bartholemew Warde
- 1558 Robert Taylor
- 1560 Edward Parker
- 1564 Richard Halliwell
- 1565 Willian Mann
- 1570 Jeremias Loveday
- 1583 Christopher Diggles
- 1608 Peter Walter
- 1623 John Crispe
- 1665 Walter Powell
- 1712 Anthony Reid (qui obit 1714)
- 1714 Johannes Crisp
- 1721 Nathan Drake (qui obit 1752)
- 1753 Thomas Sympson (qui obit 1786)
- 1792 George Jepson
- 1797 William Gray
- 1826 S.Martin
- 1829 Richard Garvey, Senior
- 1862 Henry Woollaston Hutton
- 1876 William Barber Lightfoot
- 1878 Peter Llewellyn
- 1880 George Tyson Harvey
- 1894 William Neville Usher
- 1901 Henry Leigh Bennett
- 1904 Arthur Roland Maddison
- 1907 Cecil Edward Bolam
- 1926 Charles Harold Scott
- 1940 Euclid Curry Butterworth
- 1945 Cyril Theodore Henry Dams
- 1952 Hugh Frank Riches
- 1967 David Nigel Griffiths
- 1973 Victor Read (Priest-in-Charge: S.Mary Magdalene w. St Paul-in-the-Bail)
- 1973 John Benson Bayley (1973-75 Priest-in-Charge: S.Mary Magdalene w. St Paul-in-the-Bail. 1975:The Benefice of Lincoln Minster Group is created. 1975 Rector: Lincoln Minster Group)
- 2003 Edward Michael Crispin Bowes-Smith (Priest-in-Charge) (2012 The Benefice of Lincoln Minster Group is dissolved)

VICAR

- 2014 Matthew Alexander Whitehead
- 2018 Adrian Paul Smith

== Organ ==
In 1864 a Lieblich organ was installed by T. C. Lewis. In 1866 a new instrument was installed by T. H. Nicholson of Lincoln, rebuilt in 1914 by Henry Jackson of Lincoln and in 1945 by Cousans of Lincoln. Details of the organ can be found on the National Pipe Organ Register.

=== Organists ===
- 1855 L. Mawer
- 1855 Miss Carlill
- 1856 Mrs Mawer
- c.1858 Allen
- 1858 B. Wray (died in office)
- c.1860 J. Wilson
- 1870 William Lawrence (also junior assistant organist at cathedral)
- 1880 Ernest Wood
- 1883 Frank George
- 1920 John Rayner
- 1947 Dennis Townhill (also pupil-assistant organist at cathedral)
- 1949 Denys Talbot
- 1954 Peter Rushton
- 1957 Oswald Lintern
- 1992 Christopher Brook
