= Colin Dunlop (bishop) =

(David) Colin Dunlop (31 July 1897 – 23 February 1968) was an Anglican bishop in the 20th century.

Son of Scottish East India merchant David Jugurtha Dunlop, of 25, Wickham Road, Beckenham, Kent (now Greater London), and Laura Frances, née Beddard, Dunlop was educated at Radley and New College, Oxford (BA 1921, MA 1924), and was ordained after wartime service. He enlisted in 1915 as ‘Medically A1’ and served with the 3rd Buffs in France. He was a lieutenant when he relinquished command to attend New College. His first post was as a curate at St Mary, Primrose Hill, after which he became Chaplain to George Bell, Bishop of Chichester, and Chaplain at St Peter and St Sigfrid's Church in Stockholm. Appointed Vicar of St Thomas Hove and then Henfield, in 1940 he became Provost of St Mary's Cathedral, Edinburgh before elevation to the episcopate as Bishop of Jarrow (and Archdeacon of Auckland) five years later. In 1949 he became Dean of Lincoln, a post he held until he retired in November 1964. Early in 1950, he was also appointed an Assistant Bishop of Lincoln; which post he retained till his 1964 retirement from the Deanery.

In 1955 he was appointed the first chair of the Liturgical Commission of the Church of England. There is a description of him during his time in Jarrow ‘In appearance, he was a striking character, good looking and unusual in the gift of preaching a sermon in the grand manner of a former age’.

He published the guide Lincoln Cathedral, 1978.

His granddaughter, Fuchsia Dunlop, is a food writer.

Religious titles
Preceded by Logie Danson	Provost of St Mary's Cathedral, Edinburgh; 1940–1944	Succeeded by Ivor Ramsay
Preceded by Leslie Owen	Bishop of Jarrow; 1944–1949	Succeeded by John Ramsbotham
Preceded by Robert Mitchell	Dean of Lincoln; 1949–1964	Succeeded by Michael Peck
