= Ardvreck School =

Coordinates: 56°23′00″N 3°50′47″W

- Crieff, Perth and Kinross, PH7 4EX; Scotland

Information
- Type: Preparatory day and boarding school
- Motto: Honor praemium virtutis (Honour is the reward of virtue)
- Established: 1883
- Local authority: Perth and Kinross
- Headmistress: Ali Kinge
- Gender: Coeducational
- Age: 3 to 13
- Enrolment: 130~
- Former pupils: Old Ardvreckians
- Website: http://www.ardvreckschool.co.uk/

Ardvreck School is a private boarding and day preparatory school for boys and girls aged 3–13, located in Crieff in Perth and Kinross, Scotland. It was established in 1873.

== Notable former pupils ==
- Rear-Admiral Hugh Balfour (1933-1999), senior Royal Navy officer.
- Jonathan Hammond (born 1980), British sport shooter and Commonwealth Games gold medalist.
- Major General George Henry Inglis (1902-1979), senior British Army officer.
- Jules Molyneaux (born 2008), youngest person to climb the Matterhorn.
- James Provan (born 1936), farmer and politician.
- Ivor Ramsay (1902-1956), Anglican priest.
- Lindsay de Sausmarez, head of government, Guernsey
