= Kevin Franz =

Kevin Gerhard Franz (born 16 June 1953) was until 2017 Lead Healthcare Chaplain for Mental Health Partnerships for Greater Glasgow and Clyde Health Board.

He was educated at the University of Edinburgh and ordained deacon in the Scottish Episcopal Church in 1979. He began his career as a Curate at St Martin, Edinburgh. After this he was Rector of St John's, Selkirk and then Provost of St Ninian's Cathedral, Perth. Since then he has been General Secretary of Action of Churches Together in Scotland (1999–2007), General Secretary of Quaker Peace and Social Witness London, and from 2009 was Lead Chaplain for Mental Health in Greater Glasgow and Clyde Health Board.

Religious titles
Preceded by Graham John Thompson Forbes	Provost of St Ninian’s Cathedral, Perth; 1990 – 1999	Succeeded by Hunter Buchanan Farquharson
