= Patrick Rodger =

British Anglican bishop (1920–2002)

The Right Reverend Patrick Rodger
- Bishop of Oxford
- Church: Church of England
- Diocese: Diocese of Oxford
- In office: 1978 to 1986
- Previous posts: Bishop of Manchester (1970–1978); Provost of St Mary's Cathedral, Edinburgh (1967–1970)

Orders
- Ordination: 1949 (deacon); 1950 (priest)
- Consecration: 1970

Personal details
- Born: Patrick Campbell Rodger; 28 November 1920
- Died: 8 July 2002 (aged 81)
- Denomination: Anglicanism
- Education: Christ Church, Oxford; Westcott House, Cambridge

Patrick Campbell Rodger (28 November 1920 – 8 July 2002) was an Anglican bishop and ecumenist. He was the Bishop of Manchester (1970–1978) and Bishop of Oxford (1978–1986).

== Early life and education ==
He came from a prosperous middle-class family in Helensburgh, Argyll and Bute, Scotland. He was educated at Cargilfield, a prep school in Edinburgh, and at Rugby School, then an all-boys public school (i.e. independent boarding school).

Towards the end of the Second World War he served in the Royal Corps of Signals. After a brilliant undergraduate career at Christ Church, Oxford (BA 1947) he studied for ordination at Westcott House, Cambridge.

== Ordained ministry ==
Rodger was ordained in the Scottish Episcopal Church as a deacon in 1949 and as a priest in 1950. From 1949 to 1951, he served his curacy at St John's, Edinburgh. He then moved in to chaplaincy, working at the University of Edinburgh with Anglican students between 1951 and 1955.

He served ministries in Edinburgh (including a time as Provost of St Mary's Cathedral). After his first curacy in Edinburgh, he worked for the Student Christian Movement. From 1961 to 1966 he was a member of staff of the World Council of Churches (Executive Secretary for Faith and Order). He returned from Geneva after being nominated (but not elected) as General Secretary of the WCC. In the event the post went to the Revd Eugene Carson Blake. During his service as an Anglican Bishop he was also chair of the Churches' Unity Commission and president of the Conference of European Churches. As Bishop of Oxford he presided over the beginning of an Area scheme which delegated functions from the diocesan to his suffragan or "Area" bishops, in order to decentralise the work of the diocese. In retirement he served as an assistant bishop in the Diocese of Edinburgh. In 1989, he published Songs in a Strange Land, a devotional book on praying with the Psalms.

He was an early advocate of the ordination of women as deacons and priests.

Church of England titles
Preceded by Reginald Foskett	Provost of St Mary’s Cathedral, Edinburgh; 1967–1970	Succeeded by George Crosfield
Preceded by William Greer	Bishop of Manchester; 1970–1978	Succeeded by Stanley Booth-Clibborn
Preceded by Kenneth Woollcombe	Bishop of Oxford; 1978–1986	Succeeded by Richard Harries
