= Reginald Foskett =

Reginald Foskett (1909 – 13 November 1973) was the fourth Anglican Bishop of Penrith in the modern era.

Born in 1909 he was educated at Derby School and Keble College, Oxford and ordained priest in 1933. After Curacies at Gedling and Mansfield he was Rector at Ordsall followed by service as Rural Dean of Ilkeston. From 1957 he was Provost of St Mary's Cathedral, Edinburgh before elevation to the Episcopate a decade later: a post he was to hold for only three years, retiring prematurely due to ill-health. A dedicated historian of the church and of African history., he died on 13 November 1973.

== Notes ==
Religious titles
Preceded by Hector Bransby Gooderham	Provost of St Mary’s Cathedral, Edinburgh; 1957 – 1967	Succeeded by Patrick Campbell Rodger
Preceded by Cyril Bulley	Bishop of Penrith; 1967 – 1970	Succeeded by William Edward Augustus Pugh
