= St Mary's Cathedral, Edinburgh (Episcopal) =

Cathedral in Edinburgh, Scotland

Coordinates: 55°56′55″N 3°12′58″W

St Mary's Episcopal Cathedral
- Cathedral Church of Saint Mary the Virgin
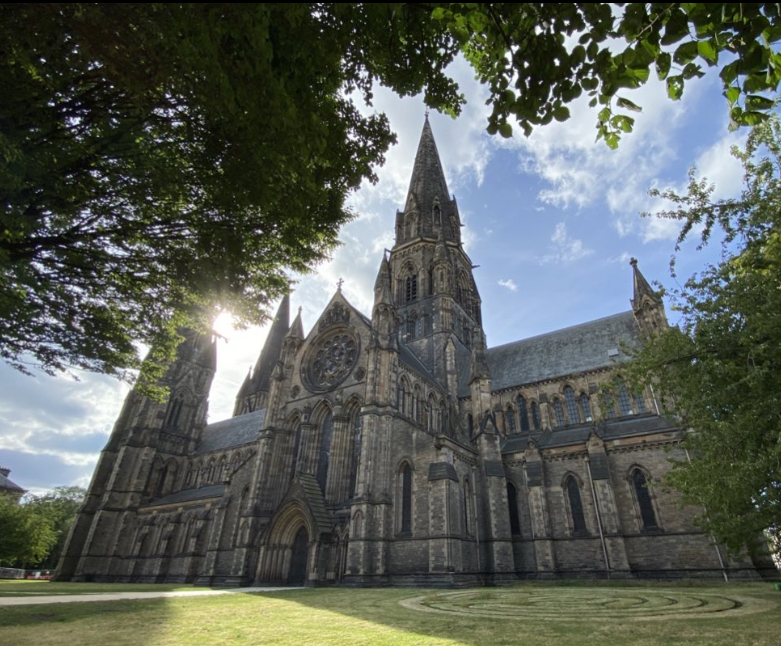

- Location in Edinburgh; Palmerston Place EH12 5AW
- Location: Palmerston Place, Edinburgh EH12 5AW
- Country: Scotland
- Denomination: Scottish Episcopal Church
- Churchmanship: Broad Church
- Website: www.cathedral.net

History
- Dedication: St Mary the Virgin

Administration
- Diocese: Edinburgh

Clergy
- Bishop: Dagmar Winter
- Priest(s): John Conway; Marion Chatterley; Paul Foster

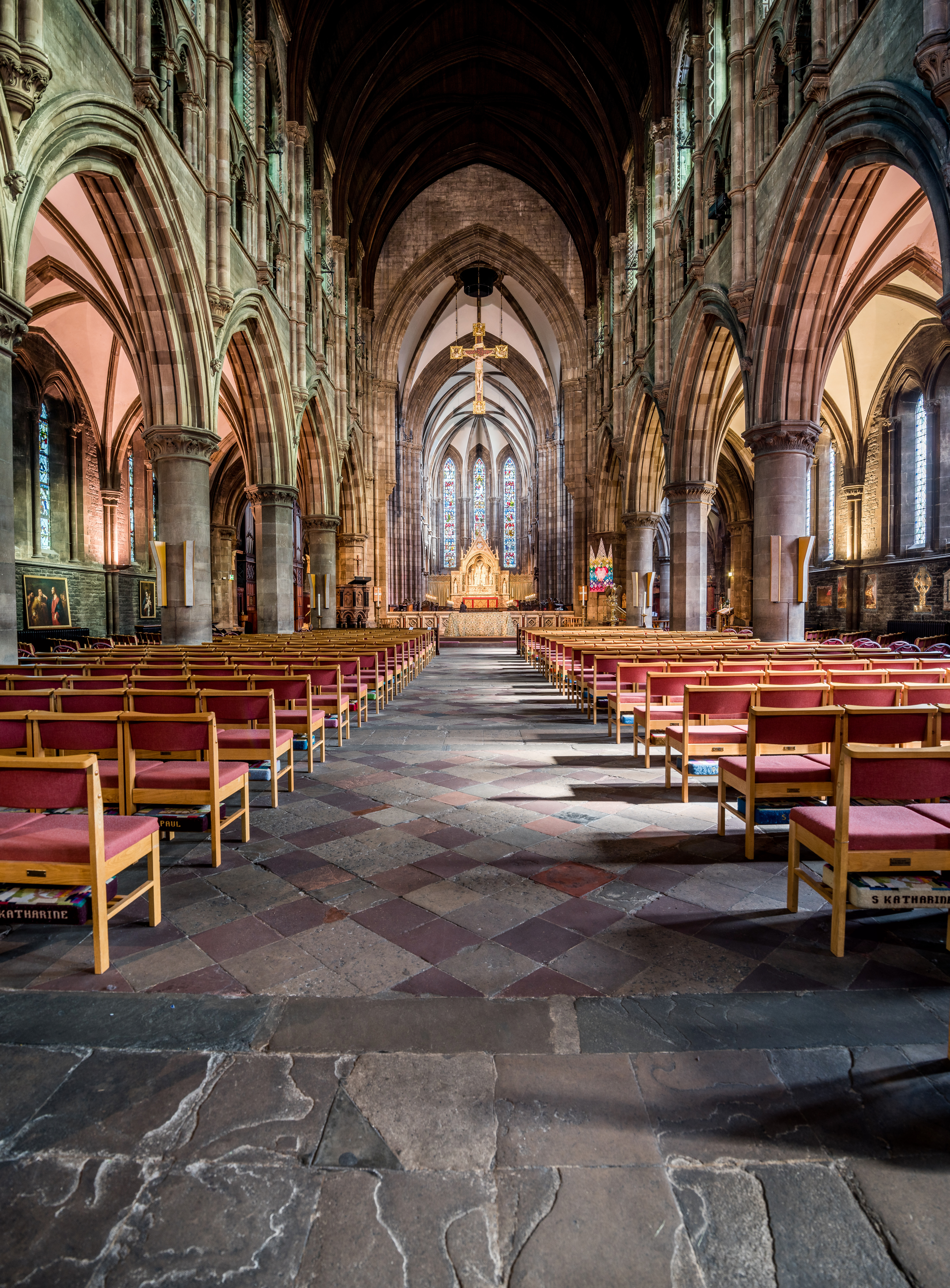
St Mary's interior looking down the centre aisle to the high altar

The Cathedral Church of Saint Mary the Virgin, commonly known as St Mary's Episcopal Cathedral, (Note: Scottish Gaelic: Cathair-eaglais Easbaigeach an Naoimh Moire) is a cathedral of the Scottish Episcopal Church in the West End of Edinburgh, Scotland; part of the worldwide Anglican Communion.

Its foundation stone was laid in Palmerston Place on 21 May 1874 by the Duke of Buccleuch and Queensberry. The building was consecrated on 30 October 1879.

St Mary's Episcopal Cathedral is the mother church of all Scottish Episcopal churches in the Edinburgh diocese, which stretches from the Firth of Forth down to the English border. There are seven dioceses in Scotland. St Mary's is the see of the Bishop of Edinburgh, one of the seven bishops of the Scottish Episcopal Church.

The cathedral was designed in a Victorian Gothic revival style by architect Sir George Gilbert Scott. It has attained Category A listed building status, and is part of the Old Town and New Town of Edinburgh World Heritage Site. The cathedral is one of only three in the United Kingdom that feature three spires, the other two being Lichfield and Truro cathedrals. The main spire is 90 metres (295 ft) tall, making the building the tallest in the Edinburgh urban area. The Song School and the Chapter House were also added in years following consecration – the Chapter house in 1880. The two west spires – "Barbara" and "Mary" – were completed in 1917.

== History ==
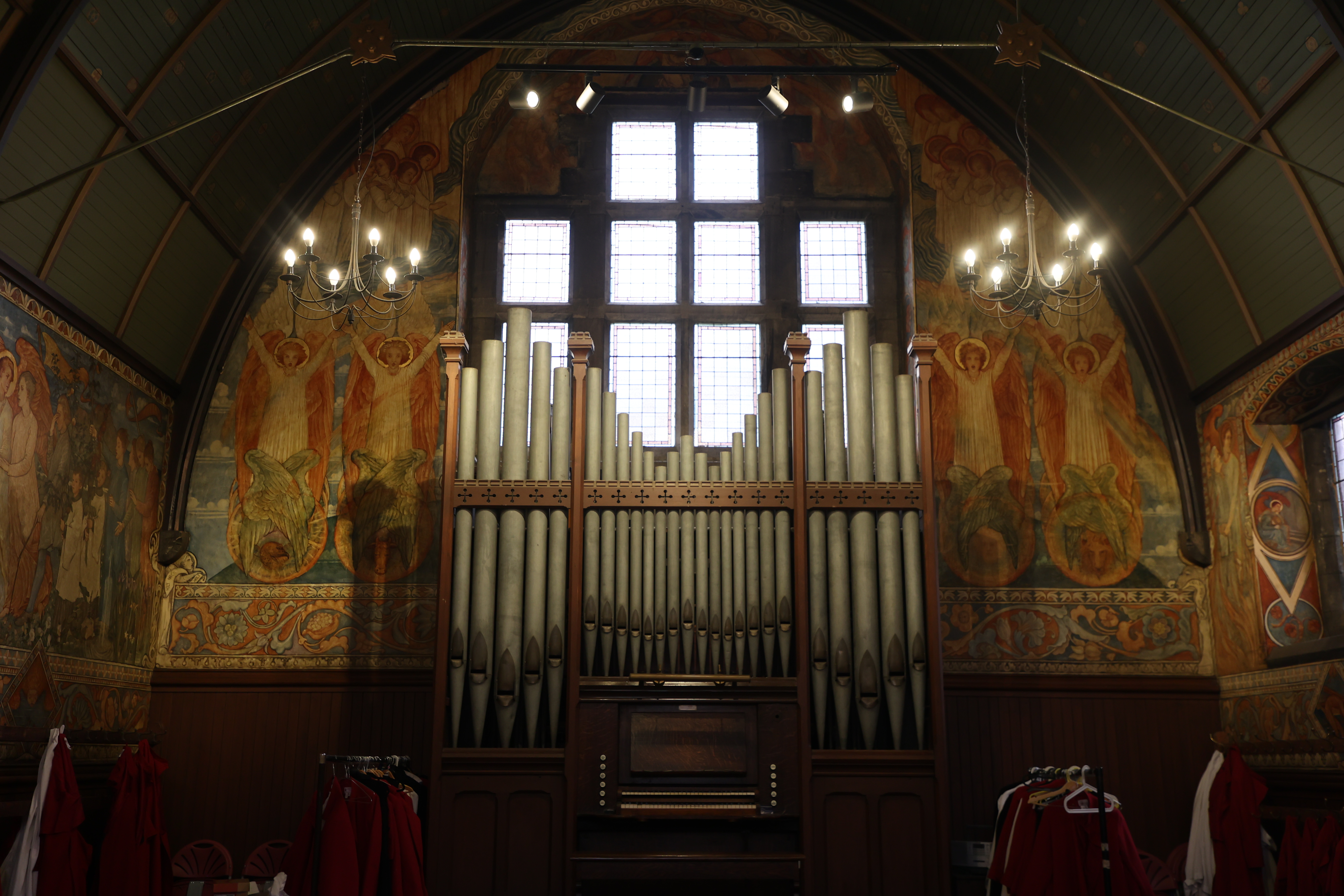
Murals inside the Song School

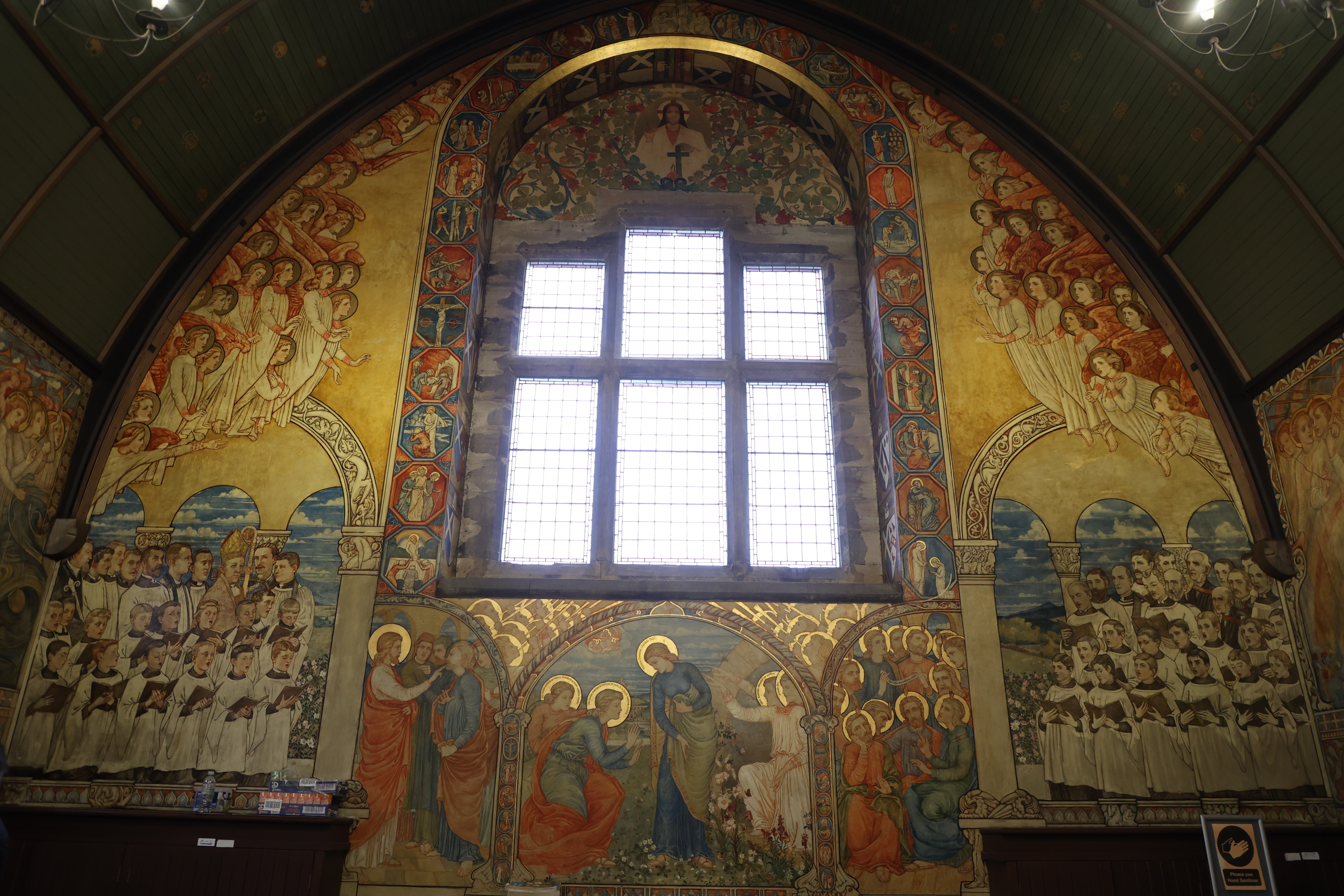
Murals inside the Song School looking away from the organ

In 1689, following the Glorious Revolution, Presbyterianism was restored in place of episcopacy in the national Church of Scotland. This led to the emergence of the Scottish Episcopal Church as a separate Christian denomination.

Edinburgh's historic St Giles' Cathedral was raised to cathedral status in 1633, the seat of the newly established Bishop of Edinburgh. However the rejection of episcopacy saw the cathedral converted to Presbyterian use. For a time the Episcopal residue of that congregation worshipped in an old woollen mill in Carrubber's Close, near the site of the present Old St Paul's Church.

A bequest by Barbara and Mary Walker left the cathedral's site in Edinburgh's West End to the Episcopal Church alongside an endowment. administered by the Walker Trustees, allowing for the building of a cathedral dedicated to St Mary the Virgin. The sisters owned the surrounding Drumsheugh Estate and lived in Easter Coates House, which survives to the north of the cathedral. They were the granddaughters of the Rev. George Walker, the Episcopal minister of Oldmeldrum Church (1734–1781). Their father, William Walker, was Attorney in Exchequer, and Bearer of the White Rod of Scotland; their mother was Mary Drummond, daughter of George Drummond, six times Lord Provost of Edinburgh and initiator of the New Town. William Walker bought the Coates estate from the Byres family around 1800 and is remembered in the street names William Street and Walker Street round the corner from Manor Place.

=== Design and construction ===
The cathedral was designed by Sir George Gilbert Scott and the foundation stone was laid on 21 May 1874 by the Duke of Buccleuch and Queensberry, whose family had been supportive of Scottish episcopacy over the previous hundred years. Inside the stone was placed a bottle containing a copy of the trust deed, the Edinburgh Post Office Directory, Oliver and Boyd's Almanac, newspapers and coins. The cathedral's builder was G. W. Booth and the clerk of works was Edwin Morgan.

St Mary's Episcopal Cathedral has four main doors: the west, east, north and south doors. The cathedral's main entrance is the ornate west entrance, from Palmerston Place, which features Saint Peter and the key to the Kingdom of Heaven.

In preparation for the opening of the cathedral a congregation had been formed to worship in a temporary iron church erected on the site now occupied by the Song School. Beginning on 26 May 1876, it was ministered to by the dean, James Montgomery, and two chaplains, and grew rapidly. The nave of the cathedral was opened on 25 January 1879 and from that day, daily services have been held in the cathedral. The cathedral was consecrated on 30 October 1879 in the presence of about 200 clergy from around the country.

The twin spires at the west end, known as "Barbara" and "Mary" after the Walker sisters, were not begun until 1913 and completed in 1917. The architect for these was Charles Marriott Oldrid Scott, Sir George's grandson.

The reredos is designed by John Oldrid Scott and sculpted by Mary Grant. The critic Sacheverell Sitwell condemned the design as "peerless for ugliness, unless it be for its own sister, Scott's St John's College chapel, at Cambridge".

== Music ==
=== Choral services ===
St Mary's Cathedral is the only cathedral in Scotland to maintain a tradition of daily choral services, for most of the year, with choristers drawn from its own choir school.

It was the first cathedral in Great Britain to employ girls in the treble line as well as boys, in 1978, when Dennis Townhill was organist and choir master. In 2005, St Mary's Cathedral became the first cathedral in the Anglican tradition to have a female alto singing in daily services.

It is the only cathedral in Scotland to offer Choral Evensong during weekdays on a regular basis.

=== Song School ===
The Song School was built in 1885. It was designed by John Oldrid Scott. The Song School walls were ornately decorated by the Irish-born artist Phoebe Anna Traquair between 1888 and 1892. It provided St Mary's choir with a rehearsal space which the choir use for their daily practice. It houses a second Father Willis organ (1829). Guided tours of the Song School are available at certain times during the year.

=== St Mary's Music School and choir ===
St Mary's Music School was founded to educate its choirboys. It continues to educate choristers of the cathedral and is now a separate specialist music school open to all pupils.

=== Bells ===
There are ten original bells in the central tower of the cathedral hung for change ringing, with two further bells which have been added more recently. They were the gift of the first dean of St Mary's, James F. Montgomery. The bells were all cast by John Taylor & Co. of Loughborough to weight ratios defined by Lord Grimthorpe who was a leading bell designer of his day. This is one of only a few complete Grimthorpe rings still in existence. The tenor bell weighs 41 long cwt (4,600 lb or 2,100 kg). The bells were dedicated on 29 October 1879.

=== Festival Fringe venue ===
St Mary's Episcopal Cathedral (Venue 91) hosts classical concerts, coffee concerts, lunchtime recitals, art events and exhibitions during the annual Edinburgh Festival Fringe.

St Mary's also has an active calendar of concerts, charity concerts, events and exhibitions throughout the year.

=== Organ ===
Since 1879 there has been an organ, which was built with a mechanical action by 'Father' Henry Willis. It was changed to electro-pneumatic action in 1897 by Robert Hope-Jones. From 1931 to the present it has been maintained by Harrison & Harrison of Durham.

Nowadays its disposition consists of 57 stops.

=== Organists ===
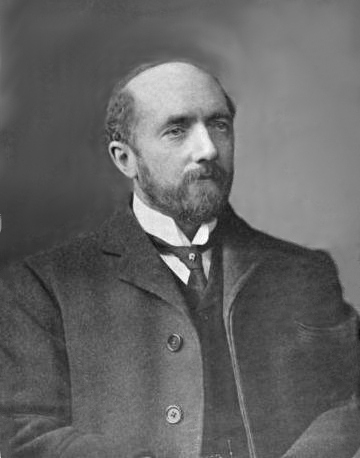
T. H. Collinson

- 1878 Thomas Henry Collinson
- 1929 Robert Head
- 1958 Eric Parsons
- 1961 Dennis Townhill
- 1991 Timothy Byram-Wigfield
- 1999 Matthew Owens
- 2005 Simon Nieminski
- 2007 (to current day) Duncan Ferguson (Master of Music & Organist)

== Provosts of the cathedral ==
The provost in the Scottish Episcopalian church is the senior priest of the cathedral, with responsibility for the mother church of the diocese. When the bishop officiates, the provost is assistant priest. They are formally addressed as The Very Reverend and more informally as Provost <first name> or simply <first name>.

- 1879–1897 James Montgomery
- 1897–1919 John Wilson
- 1920–1925 Edward Henderson
- 1925–1938 William Margetson
- 1938–1939 Logie Danson
- 1940–1944 David Dunlop
- 1944–1949 Ivor Ramsay
- 1949–1956 Hector Gooderham
- 1957–1967 Reginald Foskett
- 1967–1970 Patrick Rodger
- 1970–1990 Philip Crosfield
- 1990–2017 Graham Forbes
- September 2017 (to current day) John Conway

== Objects of interest ==
=== Memorials ===
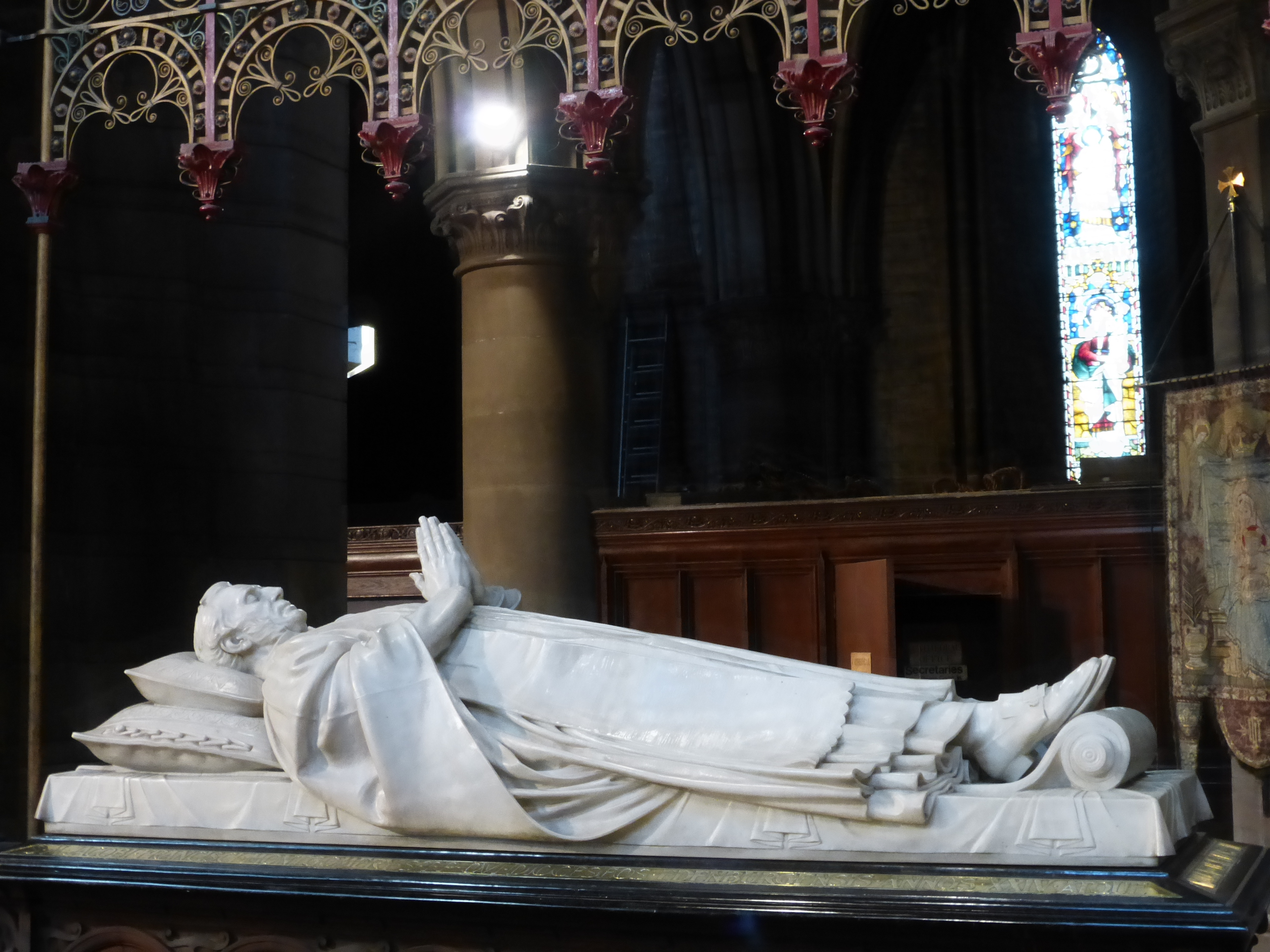
James Montgomery effigy (1902)

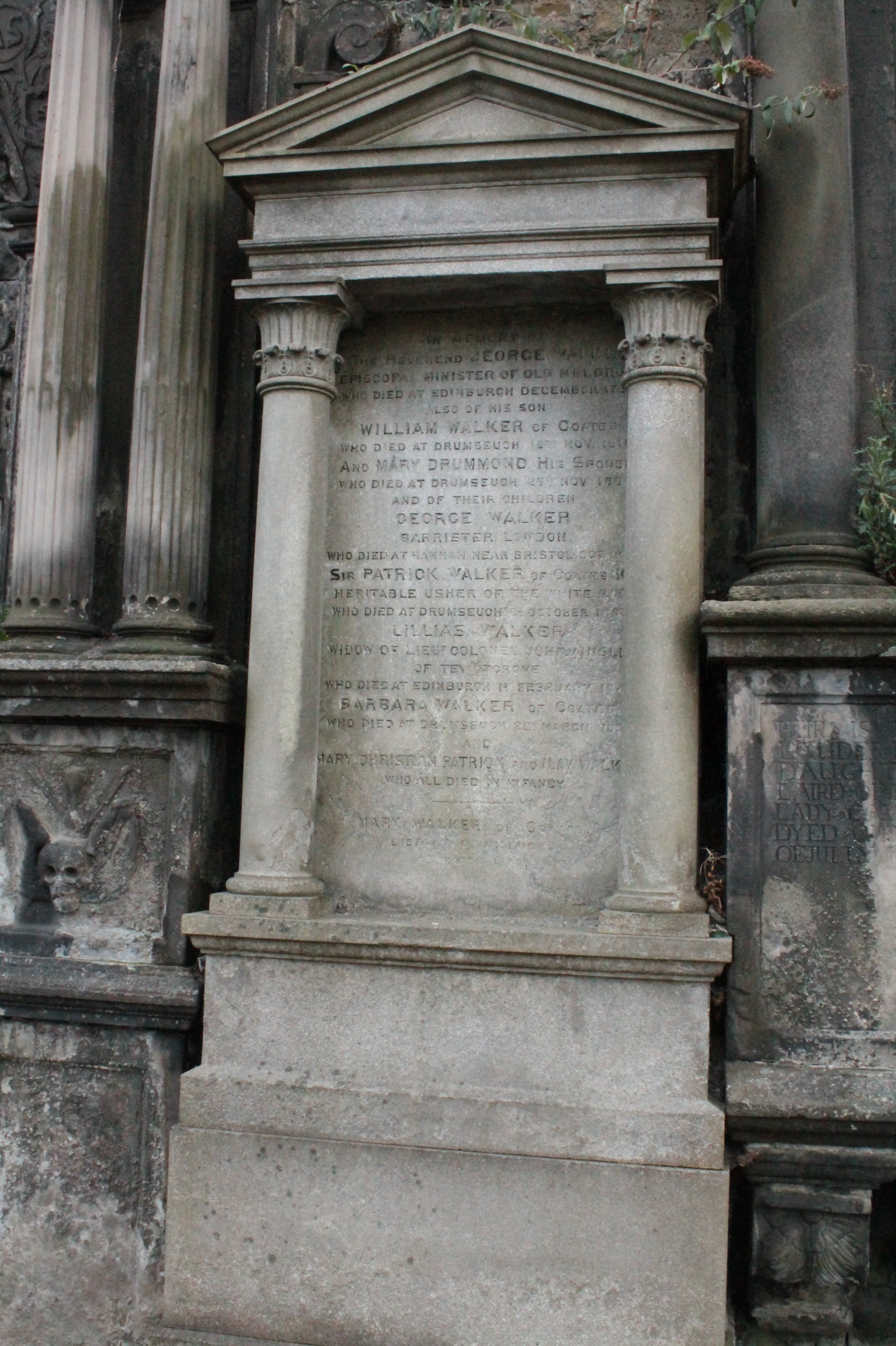
Grave of Barbara and Mary Walker, Greyfriars Kirkyard

- Captain James Dundas V.C. (1842–1879)
- General Sir Alexander Frank Philip Christison Bt. (1893–1993), erected by the Burma Star Association
- Soldiers of the Royal Scots killed overseas 1857–1870
- Reclining marble effigy of James Francis Montgomery (1902) by James Pittendrigh Macgillivray.
- Barbara and Mary Walker, the philanthropists who funded the church (see above)

The war memorial is by Pilkington Jackson (1920).

=== Rood cross ===
The Lorimer rood cross was designed as part of the National War Memorial, and completed by Sir Robert Lorimer in 1922. It is positioned high aloft the nave altar, unmissable as eyes lift to view the high altar, or the east lancet windows beyond. It is a striking figure of Christ crucified on a background of Flanders poppies and decorated with golden winged angels.

=== Walter Scott's pew ===
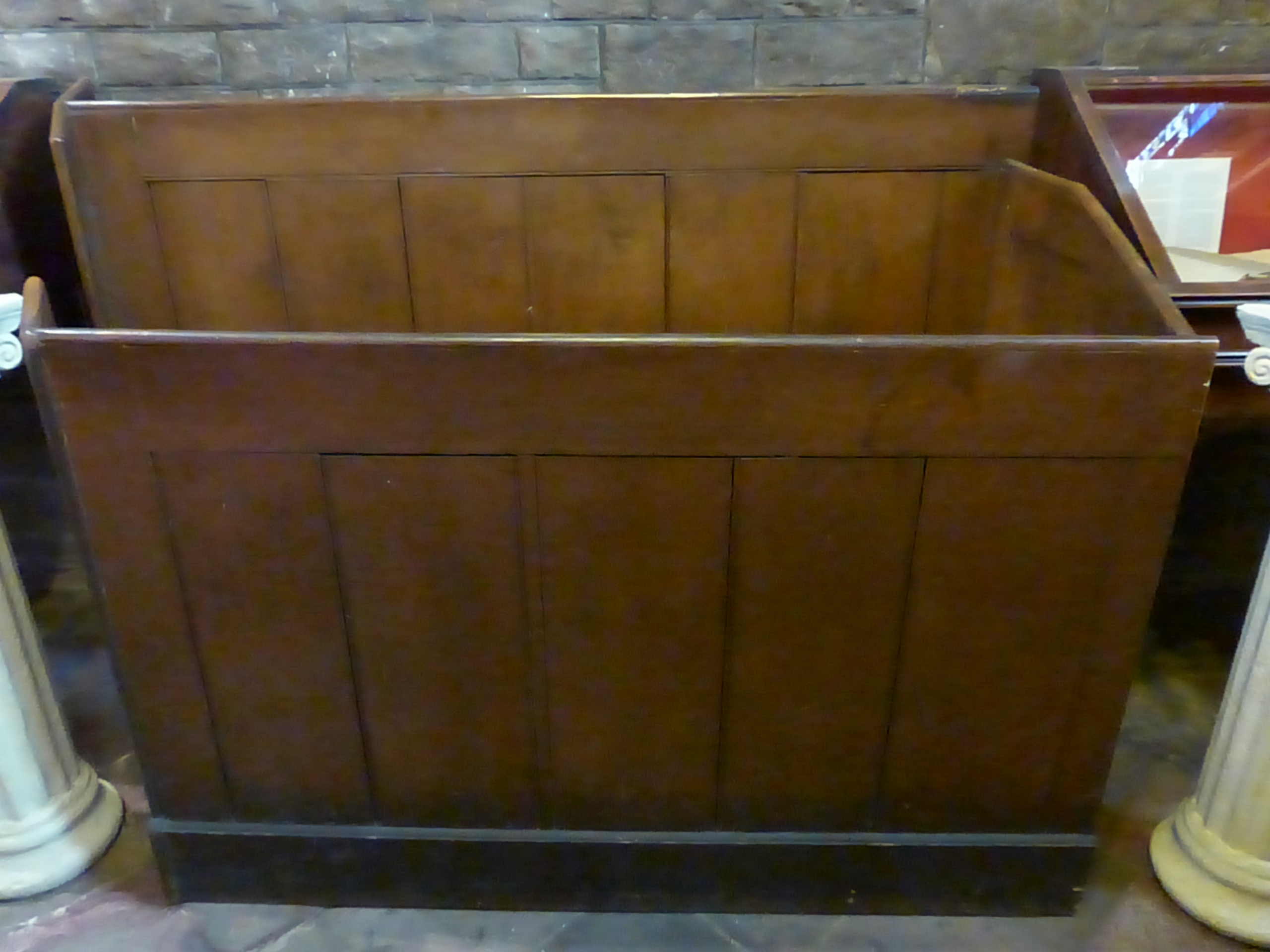
Sir Walter Scott's pew

Sir Walter Scott's pew was moved to the cathedral in 2006. Its first location was in St George's Church on York Place and was then moved in 1932 to St Paul's Church across the road when the two congregations amalgamated, and the latter building became St Paul's and St George's.

Raised a Presbyterian in the Church of Scotland where he was ordained as an elder, in adult life Scott also adhered to the doctrine of the Scottish Episcopal Church.

=== The Presence ===
A painting by Alfred Edward Borthwick, produced in 1910 and gifted by the artist in 1944, it hangs in the North Quire . It depicts the interior of the cathedral and was said to be the most reproduced picture of its time.

=== Paolozzi’s Millennium Window ===
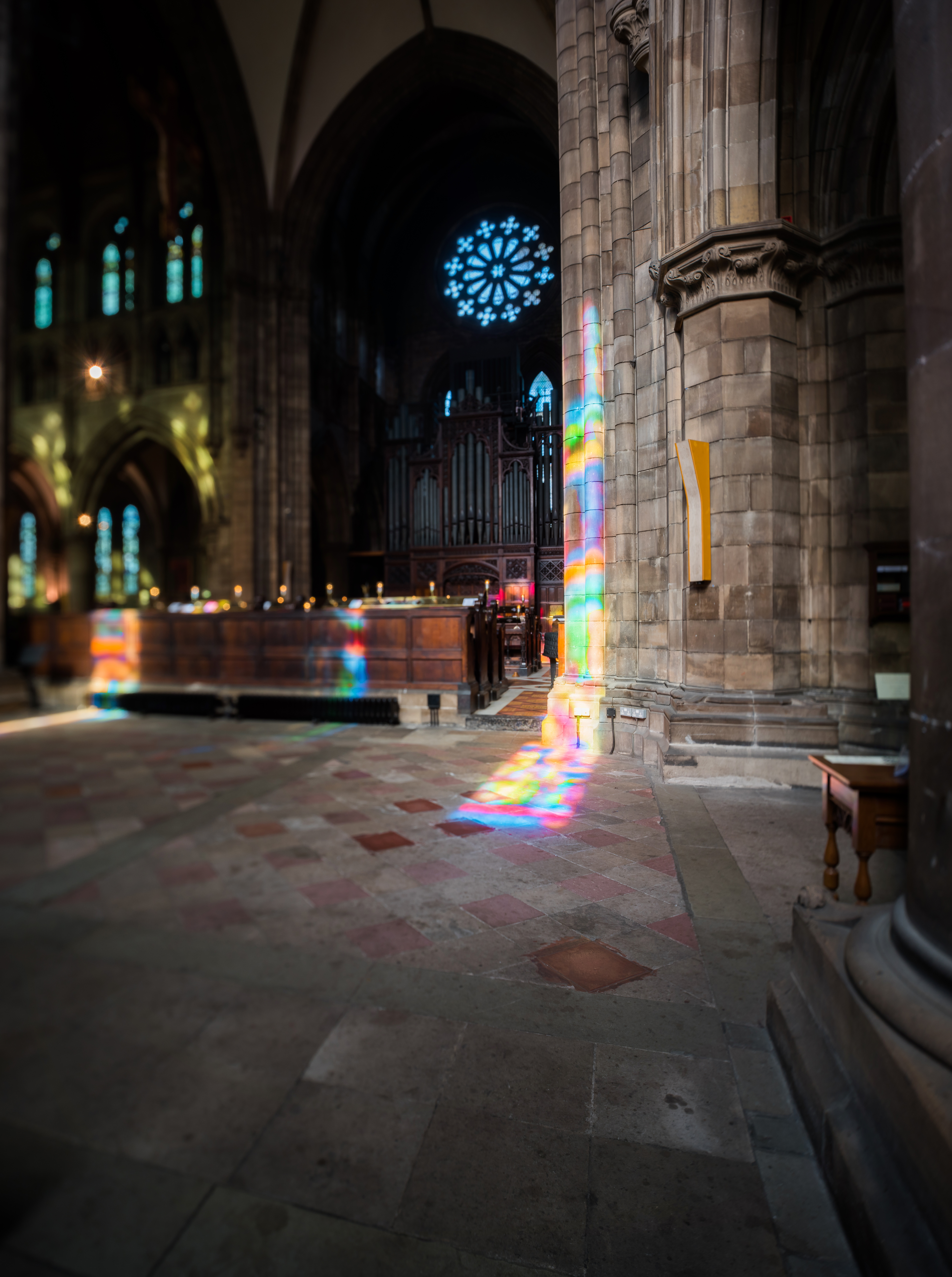
Projections of Sir Eduardo Paolozzi's Millennium Window onto pillars in the Resurrection Chapel of the cathedral

The cathedral is home to a stained-glass window reworked as an artwork in the Modern Art genre for year 2000 by Eduardo Paolozzi who was born in Leith. The glasswork consists of a large rose window with three lancet windows below, in vibrant colours of glass which are designed to project onto stonework inside the cathedral on bright days. It is visible from the south side of St Mary's from Bishop's Walk but is best viewed from inside with the light behind, from either the Resurrection Chapel on the south side, or beside the ornate wooden casing and pipework of St Mary's Father Willis organ on the north side.

=== Prayer labyrinth ===
The south grounds of the cathedral are accessed from Bishop's Walk or from the south doors in the Resurrection Chapel when these stand open.

A prayer labyrinth designed by artists connected with the cathedral has been carved and sown with wild flowers, with help from others in the congregation of St Mary's. Unlike a maze, a labyrinth is a single continuous route, from entry point to centre. The prayer labyrinth frees you to think your own thoughts or prayers for others, as you follow the path, edged by wild flowers; to attract insects.

== Depictions ==
An original painting of the cathedral by Judy Joel appeared on the second class stamp in the Royal Mail's 2024 series of special Christmas stamps.

== Gallery ==
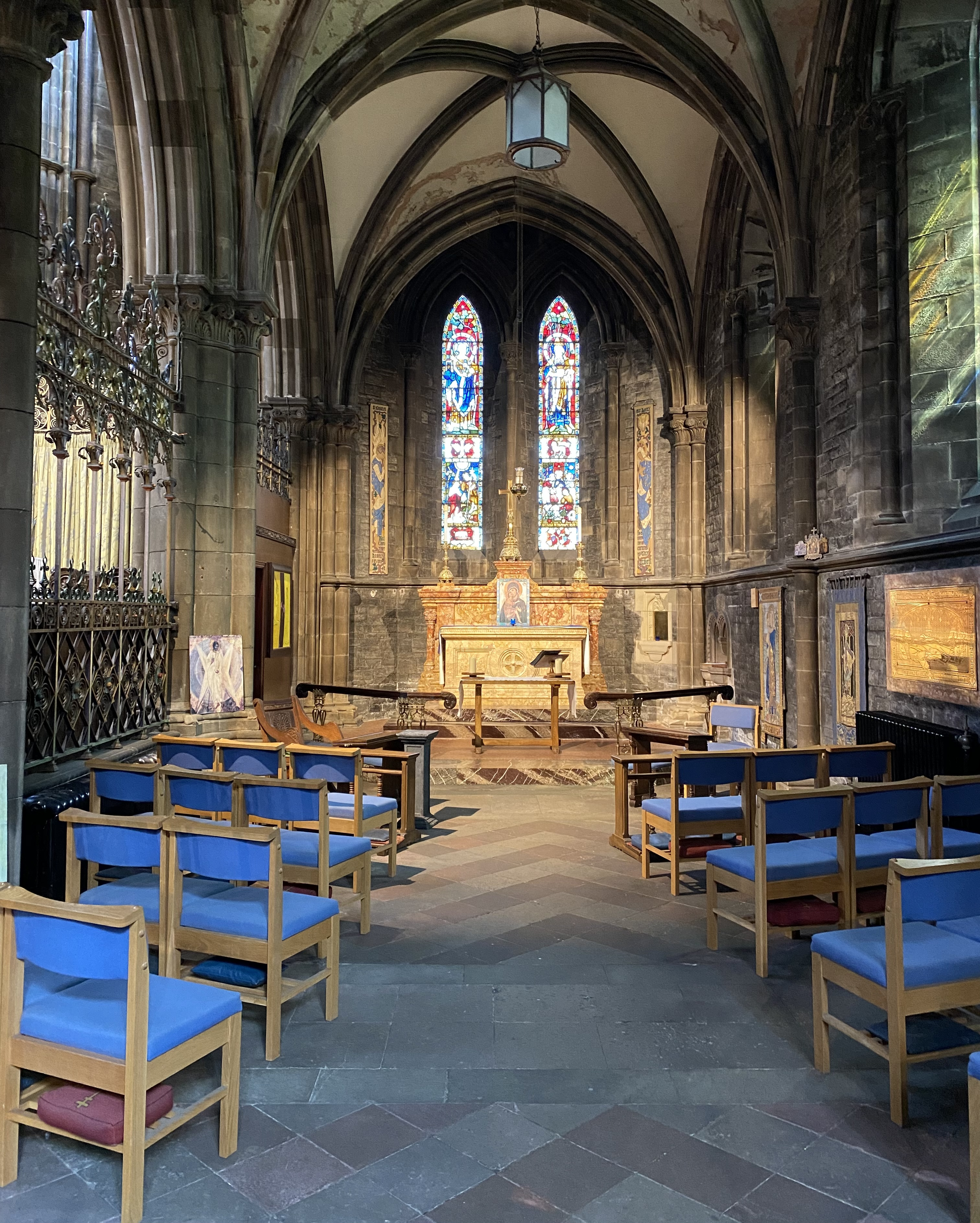
The Lady Chapel; (Note: The Lady Chapel is used for small daily services and for private thoughts and prayers.)

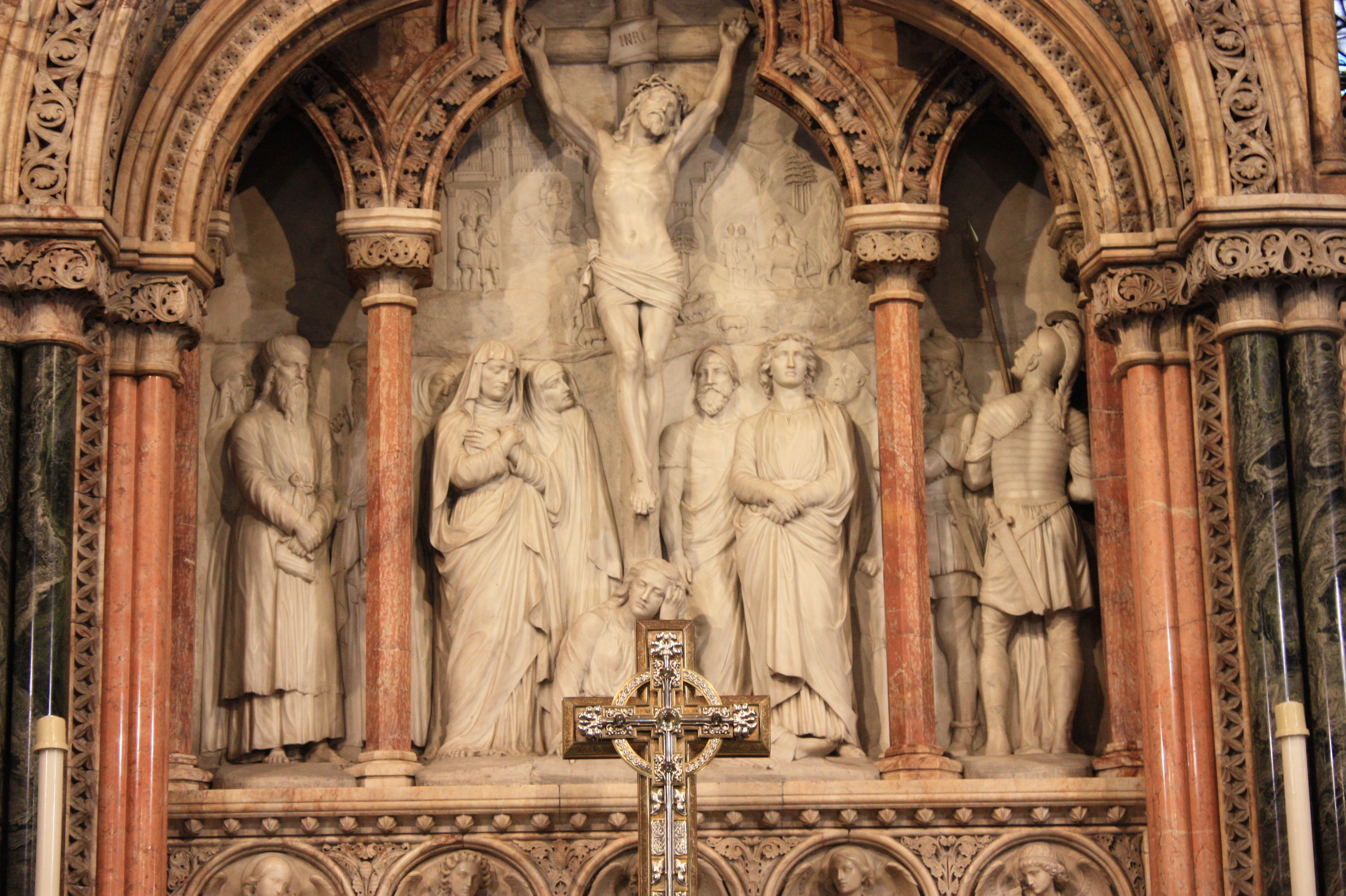
The ornate reredos (Note: The ornate reredos at the high altar was designed by John Oldrid Scott and sculpted by Mary Grant of Kilgraston in Perthshire – one of the most eminent female sculptors of 19th-century Britain, with numerous commissions from the rich and famous. The reredos is in alabaster with inlaid coloured marbles and depicts the crucifixion scene around the cross at Calvary: to Jesus' left, his mother Mary; and to his right, faithful disciple John. At Jesus' feet is a distressed Mary Magdalene. In addition there are carved wingéd angels atop the structure, and below the crucifixion scene are five marble disks each displaying an angel's face and wings. The figure to the far left of the reredos, in its own outer archway, is St Columba and to the right is St Margaret of Scotland.)

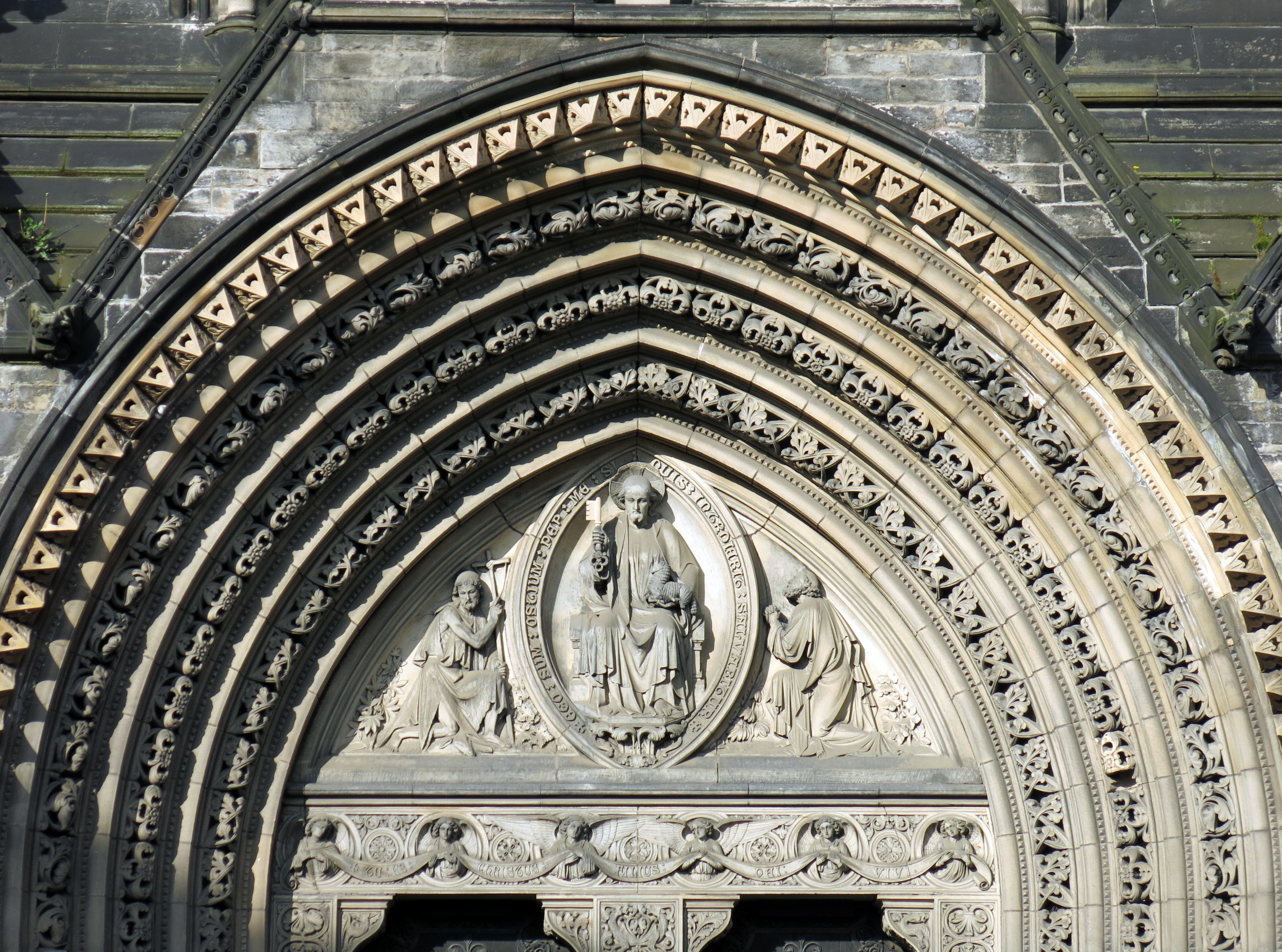
Main West entrance, Palmerston Place; St Peter holds the key to the Kingdom of Heaven

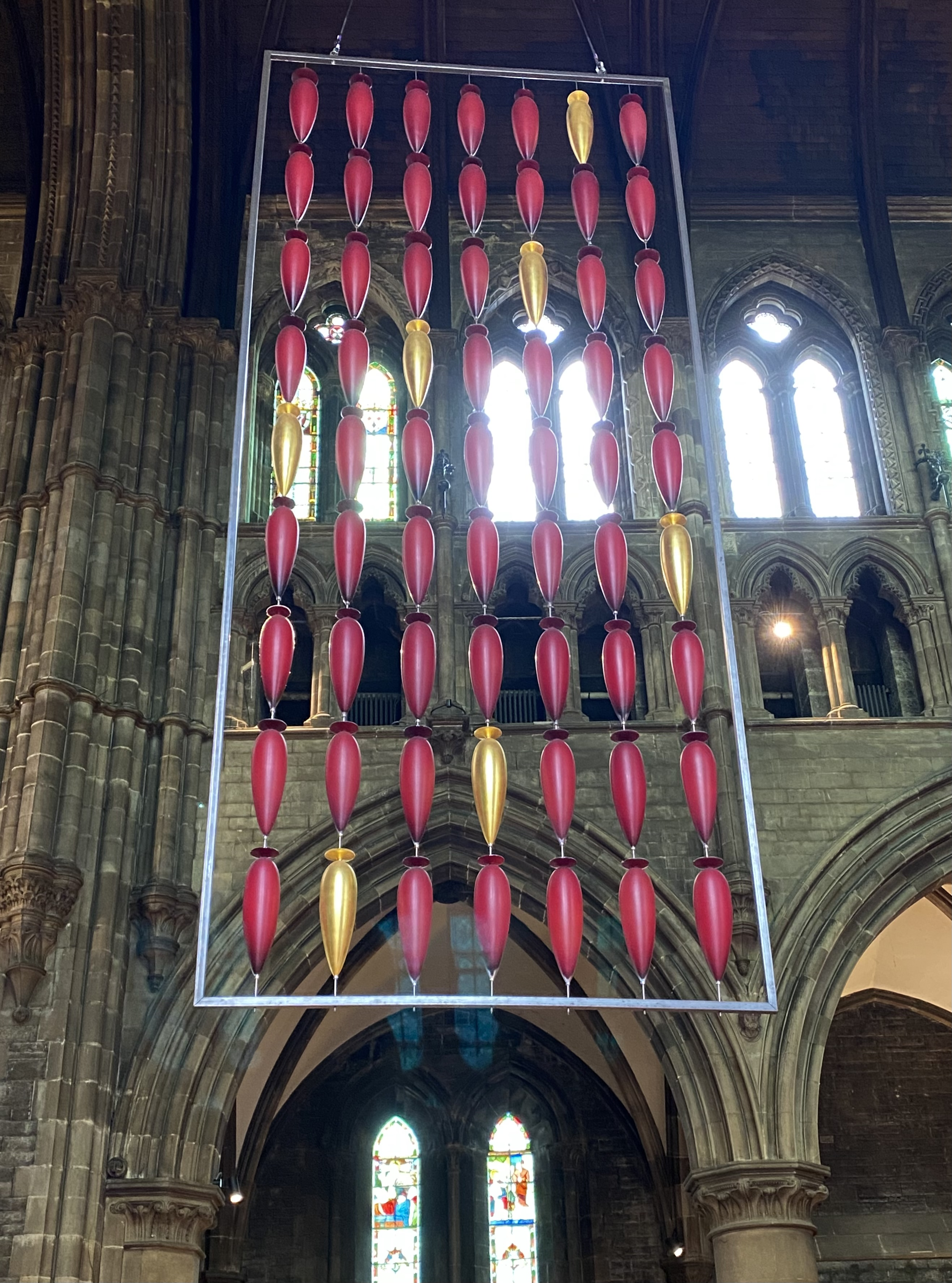
Free blown 7 cold worked glass. Gold leaf & steel. Baldwin and Guggisberg. (Note: [Part of] The Cathedral Collection 2016. Gifted to the cathedral; on permanent display.)

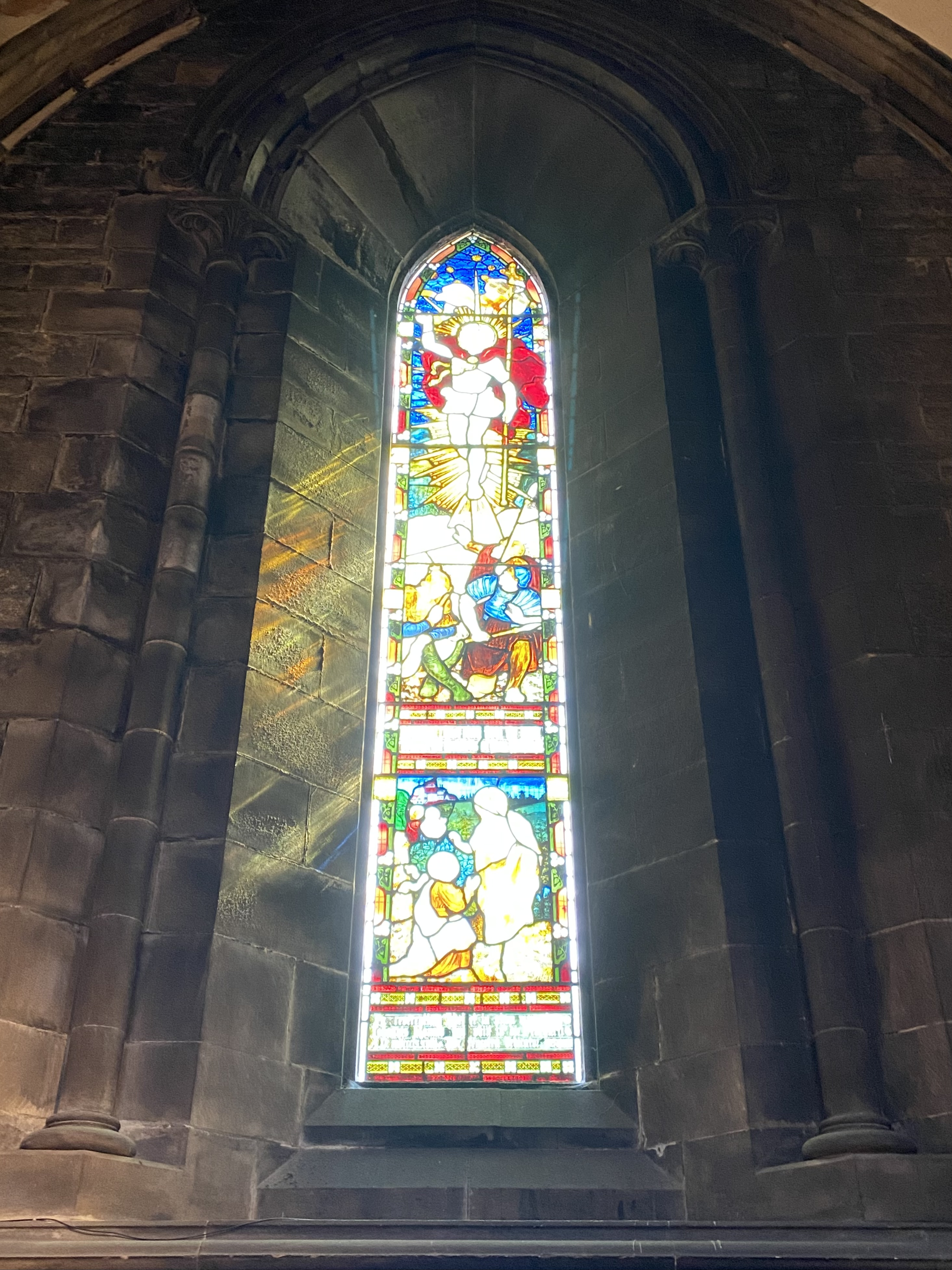
Stained glass window in the south wall of the cathedral; within the Lady Chapel

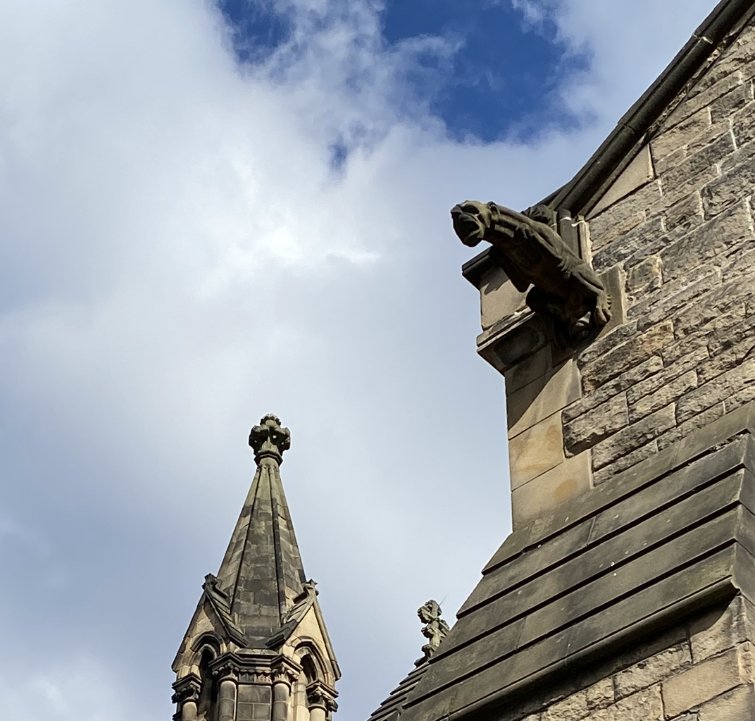
One of the many gargoyles and grotesques at the cathedral

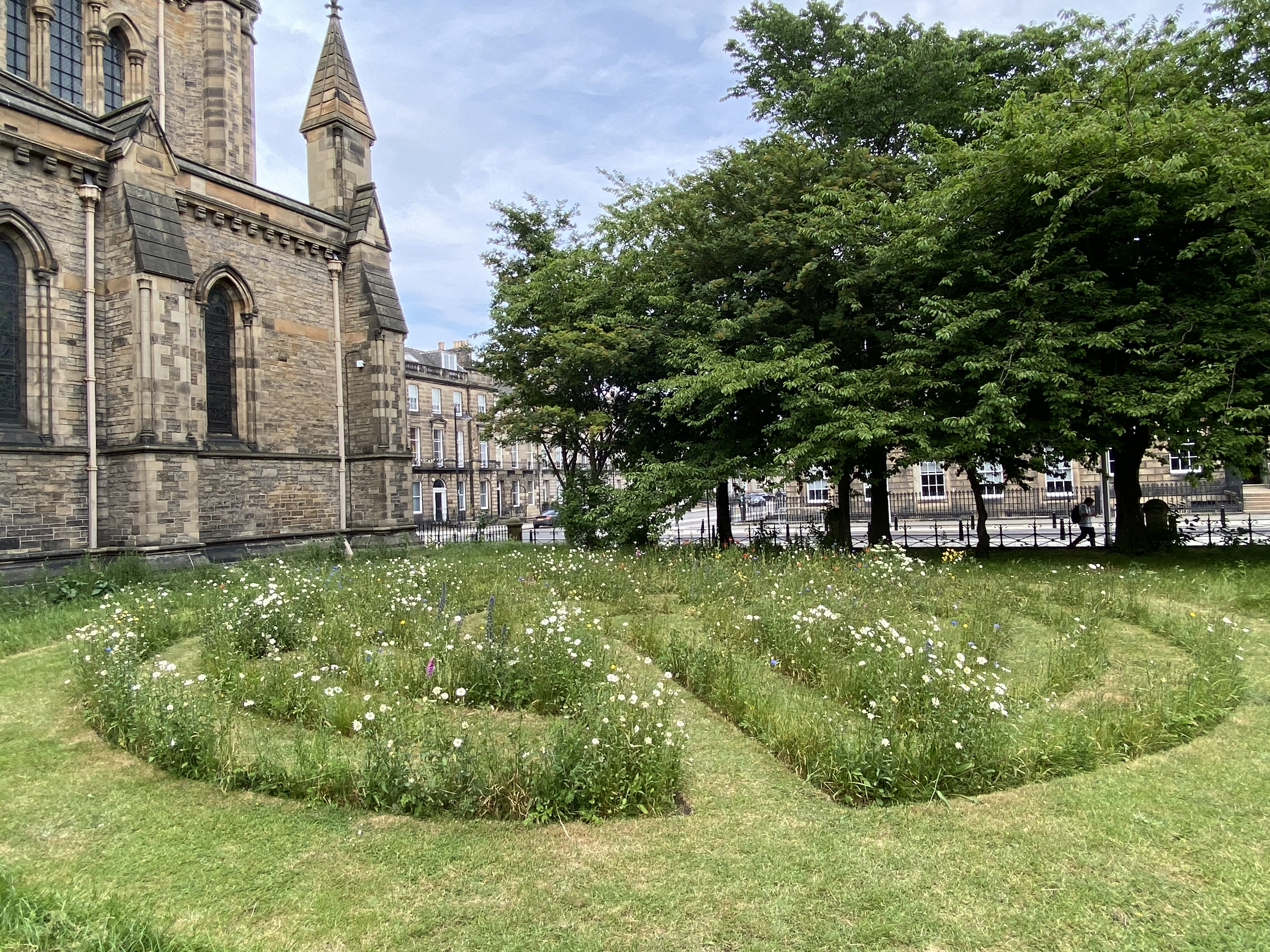
Wildflower labyrinth in the South Gardens

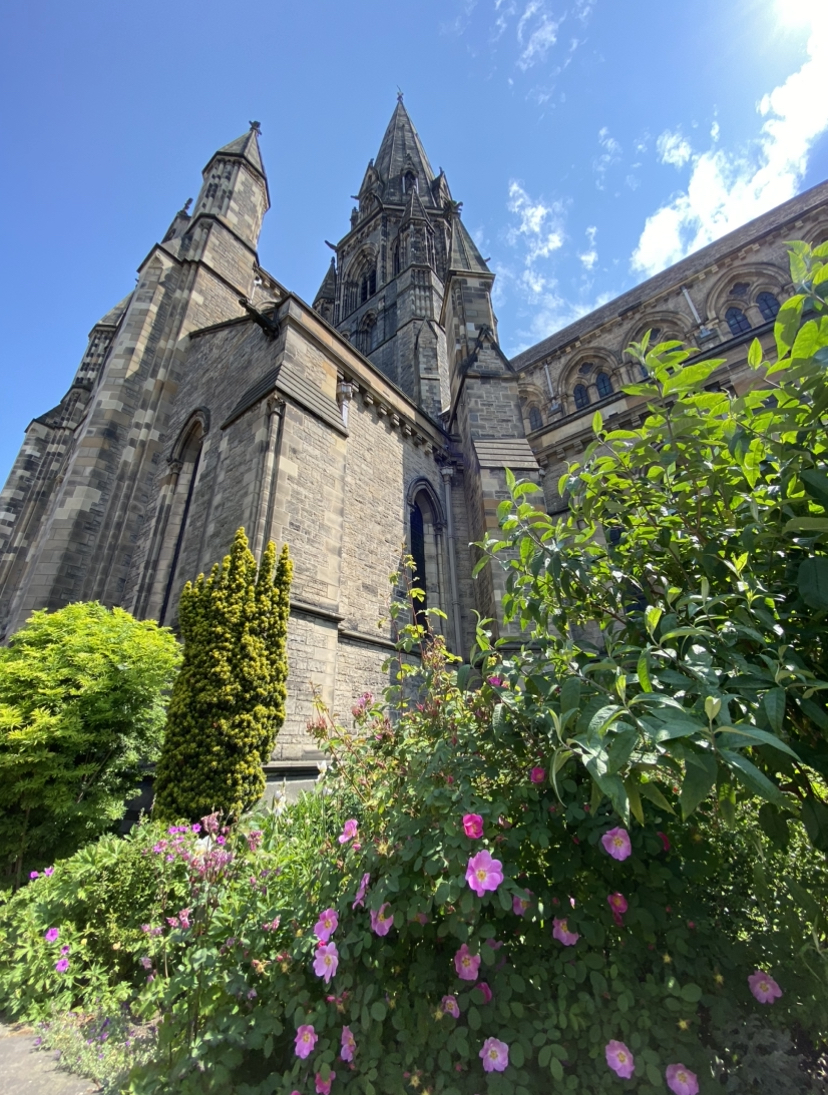
The cathedral’s North Gardens

== See also ==
- Primus of the Scottish Episcopal Church
- Bishop of Edinburgh
- Frances Burberry, dean of the Edinburgh diocese
- Diocese of Edinburgh
- List of cathedrals in the United Kingdom
- St Mary's Cathedral, Edinburgh (Roman Catholic), the Roman Catholic cathedral of similar name situated at the East End of Edinburgh
