= Dennis Townhill =

English organist & composer (1925–2008)

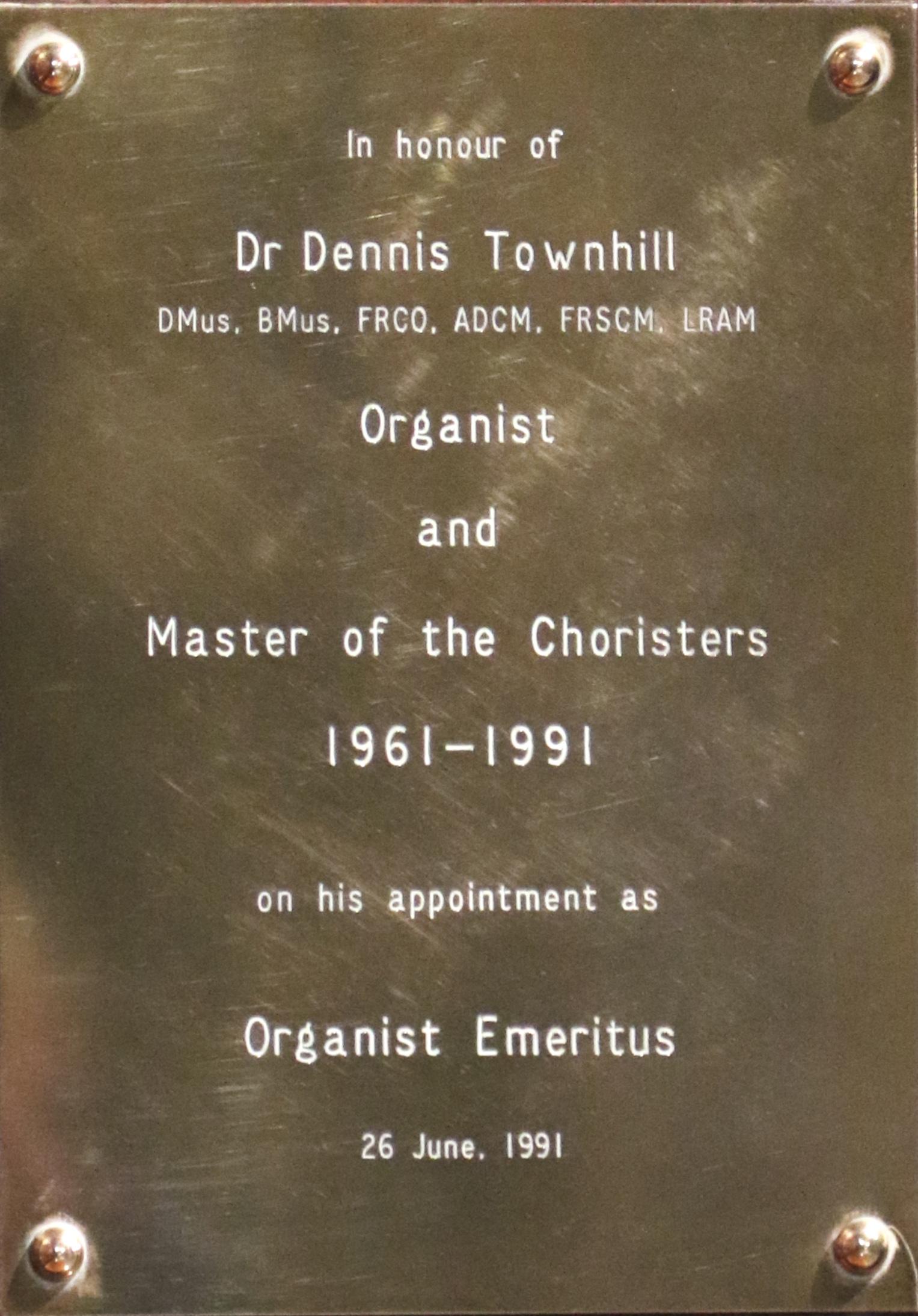
Memorial in St Mary's Cathedral, Edinburgh

Dennis William Townhill OBE (29 May 1925 – 18 July 2008) was an English organist and composer.

Born in Lincoln, he was educated at Lincoln School and studied under Dr Gordon Archbold Slater at Lincoln Cathedral.

Townhill composed a set of responses for use at Anglican evensong.

In 1970, Townhill became the driving force of a plan not only to safeguard the future of the Choir School of St Mary’s Cathedral, Edinburgh but to transform it into a new and vibrant entity. In 1972, the school was expanded into a specialist music school on the lines of the Yehudi Menuhin School, with Lord Menuhin becoming patron and referring to it as "my younger sister-school in Scotland".

He was organist and choir master at:

- St Paul's Church, Burton on Trent. 1942–1943
- St. Mary le Wigford’s Church, Lincoln 1943–1947
- St. Mary Magdalene, Bailgate, Lincoln, Lincoln 1947–1949
- St James Church, Louth 1949–1956
- Grimsby Parish Church 1956–1961
- St Mary's Cathedral, Edinburgh 1961–1991

Townhill retired in 1991, and his autobiographical memoir The Imp and the Thistle: The Story of a Life of Music Making was self-published in 2000.
