= George Henry Inglis =

British Army officer

Major-General George Henry Inglis CB CBE
- Born: 22 August 1902
- Died: 2 March 1979 (aged 76)
- Military career
- Allegiance: United Kingdom
- Branch: British Army
- Service years: 1922–1956
- Rank: Major-General
- Service number: 14525
- Unit: Royal Artillery
- Commands: Nigeria district (1953–1956); 52nd (Lowland) Infantry Division (1950–1952); 18th Training Brigade (1948)
- Conflicts: Second World War
- Awards: Companion of the Order of the Bath; Commander of the Order of the British Empire; Mentioned in Despatches (2)
- Other work: Vice-President The Royal British Legion (1978–1979)

Major-General George Henry Inglis, CB, CBE (22 August 1902 – 2 March 1979) was a senior British Army officer.

== Education ==
Inglis was educated at Ardvreck School in Crieff, Wellington College in Berkshire and the Royal Military Academy, Woolwich.

== Military career ==
Inglis was commissioned as a second lieutenant in the Royal Artillery in 1922. During the Second World War, he served in France, with South East Asia Command (SEAC) and Middle East Land Forces (MELF). Promoted to brigadier in 1944, he was mentioned in despatches for service in Burma in 1946 and again for service in Palestine in 1949.

In 1948 Inglis was commanding officer of the 18th Training Brigade, Oswestry. He was appointed a Commander of the Order of the British Empire in June 1950. He was General Officer Commanding the 52nd (Lowland) Infantry Division from 1950 to 1952. He was promoted to major general in 1951, and appointed a Companion of the Order of the Bath in 1952.

Inglis became General Officer Commanding, Nigeria district in 1953 before retiring from the British Army in 1956. From 1960 to 1967 he served as colonel commandant of the Royal Artillery.

== Appointments ==
Inglis was appointed Justice of the peace (JP) Cumberland in 1958; High Sheriff of Cumberland in 1961; deputy lieutenant of Cumberland in 1962 and vice-lieutenant of Cumberland from 1969 to 1974. He also served as vice-president of The Royal British Legion from 1978 to 1979 and president of the North West area from 1973 to 1979.

Military offices
Preceded by Roy Urquhart	GOC 52nd (Lowland) Infantry Division; 1950–1952	Succeeded by George Collingwood
