= Missal of Arbuthnott =

1491 missal by James Sibbald

The Arbuthnott Missal is the only extant missal of Scottish Use. It won a prestigious top award in the British Library's Hidden Treasures competition 2007.

James Sibbald, priest of Arbuthnott, Scotland, wrote it in 1491 on vellum in Gothic characters with illuminations. It corresponds closely with the typical edition of 1498 of the Sarum Missal. After the Reformation, the missal became the property of the Arbuthnott family, in whose possession it remained until 1897, when it was purchased by Archibald Coats of Paisley, who presented it to the town museum.

It was edited under the title Liber Ecclesie Beati Terrenani de Arbuthnott: Missale secundum usum Ecclesiæ Sancti Andreæ in Scotia by Alexander Penrose Forbes, Bishop of Brechin and published in 1864 by his brother George Hay Forbes at the Pitsligo Press, Burntisland.
