= John Hay Forbes, Lord Medwyn =

British judge (1776–1854)

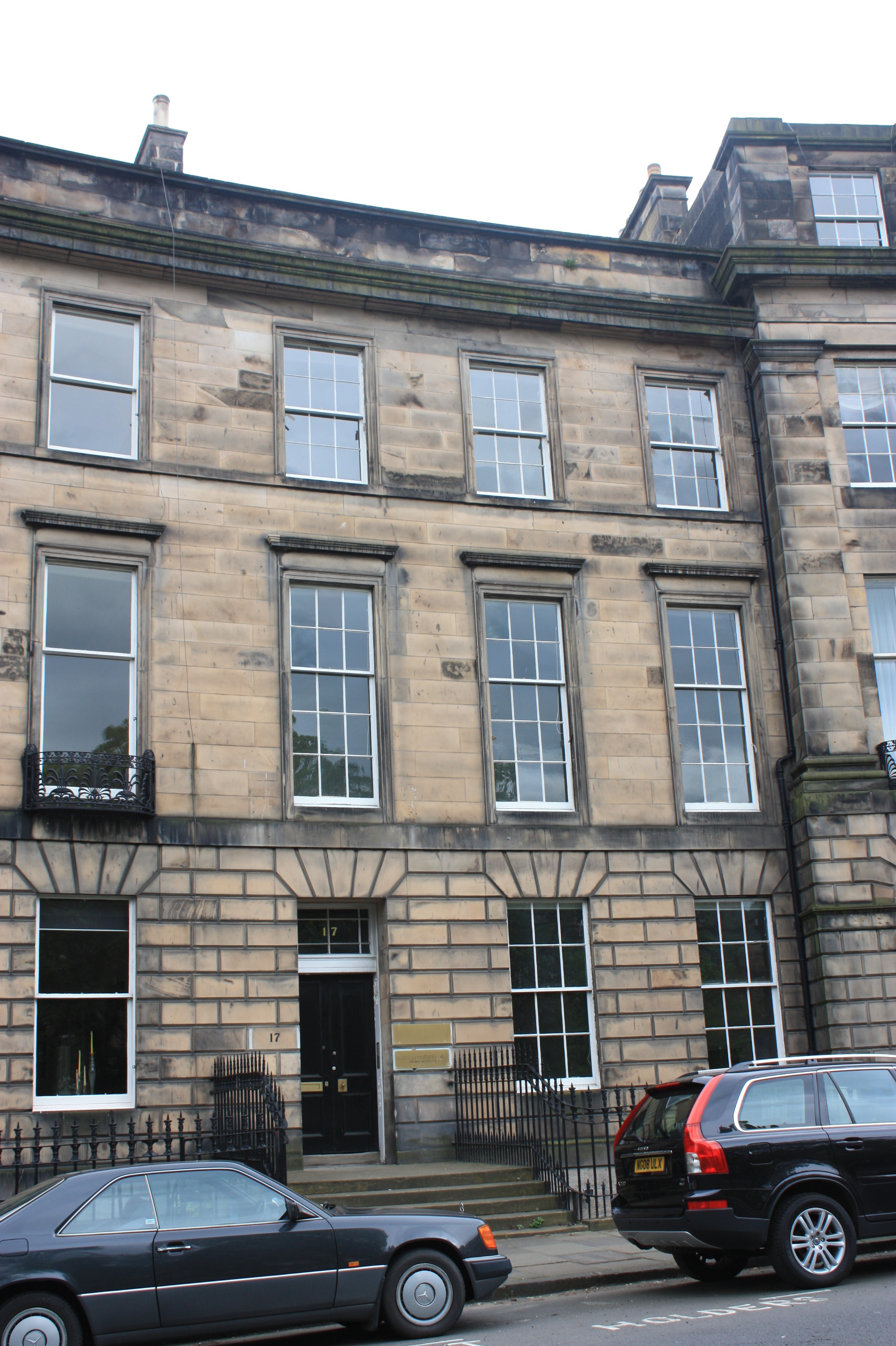
Lord Medwyn's house at 17 Ainslie Place, Edinburgh

John Hay Forbes, Lord Medwyn (19 September 1776 – 25 July 1854) was a British judge.

== Life ==
Forbes was born in Edinburgh on 19 September 1776 the second son of Sir William Forbes, 6th Baronet, and his wife Elizabeth Hay.

He studied law at Edinburgh University and was admitted to the Scottish Bar as an advocate in 1799. He was appointed Sheriff Depute of Perthshire in 1807, and was made Lord of Session in January 1825, when he assumed the courtesy title of Lord Medwyn, from his estate in Perthshire.

In the 1830s he is listed as living at 17 Ainslie Place on the Moray Estate in the west end of Edinburgh.

In December 1830 he was made a Lord of Justiciary. He resigned that appointment in May 1849, retired from the bench in October 1852, and died in Edinburgh, 25 July 1854.

== Works ==
He edited a new edition of ‘Thoughts concerning Man's Condition and Duties in this Life, and his Hopes in the World to come’, by Alexander Forbes, 4th Lord Forbes of Pitsligo (1678–1762), 1835, 4th ed. Edinburgh, 1854.

== Family ==
Forbes married Louisa Cumming-Gordon, daughter of Sir Alexander Cumming-Gordon of Altyre, Elgin. They had several children, including the sons William Forbes of Medwyn, Alexander Penrose Forbes (who became bishop of Brechin) and George Hay Forbes, Episcopalian clergyman and founder of the Pitsligo Press. Their daughters were Louisa Penuel Forbes and Helen Forbes.

== Artistic recognition ==
Forbes' portrait is held in the University of St Andrews.
