= St Salvador's Church, Dundee =

Coordinates: 56°28′12″N 2°58′18″W

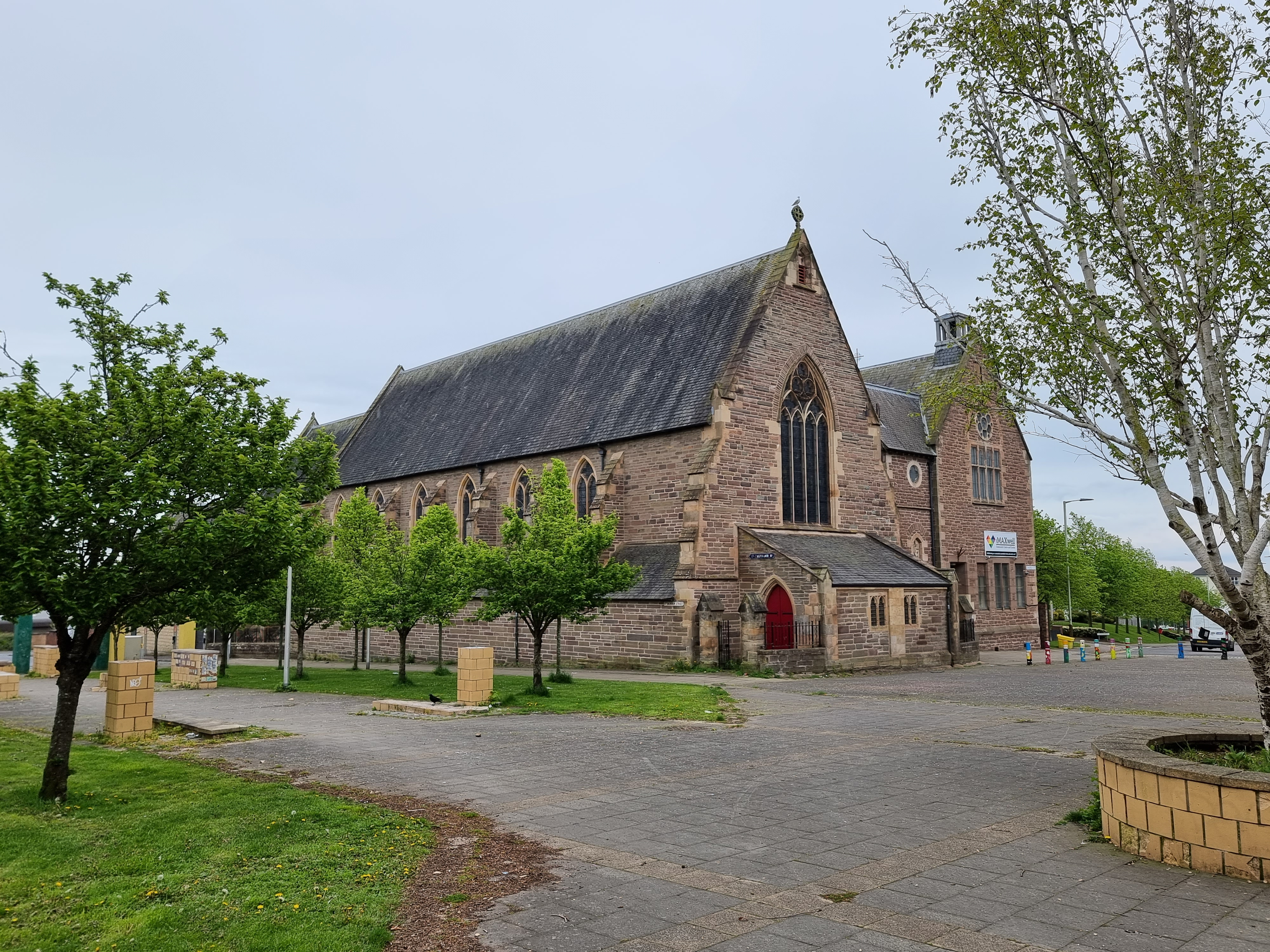
- St Salvador's Church, Dundee
- Location: Dundee
- Country: Scotland
- Denomination: Scottish Episcopal Church
- Churchmanship: Anglo-Catholic
- Website: stsalvadors.com

History
- Dedication: St Salvador
- Consecrated: 1868

Architecture
- Architect: George Frederick Bodley
- Architectural type: Church
- Style: Gothic Revival
- Completed: 1868

Administration
- Diocese: Brechin

St Salvador's Church is a Scottish Episcopal Church building in Dundee, designed in a Gothic Revival version of the English, Welsh and Scottish Decorated Style by George Frederick Bodley (with St Bride's Church, Glasgow one of only two churches by him in Scotland). Its dedication is a medieval Scottish version of Saint Saviour's.

== History ==
The parish was founded in 1856 as one of the missions to the poorer areas of the city by Alexander Penrose Forbes (Bishop of Brechin and previously a student at Oxford at the height of the Oxford Movement), specifically the mill-workers of the town's Hilltown area. Worship was originally held in the upper floor of the 1857 parish school building, also designed by Bodley and contemporary with his St Michael's, Brighton, with the nave of the permanent church only added in 1865-1868 and a chancel in 1874.

Its ceiling paintings are by Frederick Leach, whilst the friezes on the chancel arch, the reredos (showing an Annunciation and Crucifixion flanked by the Virgin Mary and John the Evangelist surrounded by the eleven post-Easter apostles and Paul of Tarsus) and much of the stained glass in the building are by Burlison and Grylls. A Wordsworth and Maskell organ was added in 1884.

Originally done in tempera, the interior decorations were repainted in oil colours in 1907 and 1936 before a restoration in 1969-1977 which won a Scottish Civic Trust award. The church and its parish hall were Category A listed in 1965, whilst the church was restored again in 2011. Its archives are held at Dundee City Archives and Dundee University Archive, Records Management and Museum Services.
