= Joseph Jobberns =

Scottish priest (1868–1936)

Joseph Brewer Jobberns OBE (25 November 1868 – 22 July 1936) was a Scottish Episcopal priest who was Dean of Brechin from 1931 until his death in 1936.

== Life ==
Jobberns was born in Fermoy, County Cork, to English parents Joseph Jobberns and Janet Brown. His father was a captain in the 39th Regiment of Foot. He was educated at Aberdeen Grammar School and the University of Aberdeen. He earned his M.A. in 1890. He was ordained curate in 1894. After a curacy in Dundee he was Rector of Holy Rood Church, Carnoustie from 1896 to 1922. From 1923 he was the incumbent at St Mary Magdalene, Dundee.

After a year of weakened health, Jobberns collapsed and died while at the altar during his service at St Mary Magdalene.

== Notes ==
Scottish Episcopal Church titles
Preceded by William Leslie Christie	Dean of Brechin; 1931–1936	Succeeded by John Eric Macrae
