= Matthew Gibson (priest) =

Matthew Sayer Gibson was Dean of Brechin from 1964 until 1971.

He was educated at Durham University and ordained in 1941. He was a Curate at St Mary Magdalene, Dundee and then Curate in charge at St Ninian, in the same city. He was then Rector of St Mary Magdalene; Chaplain to the Bishop of Brechin from 1952 to 1959; and a Canon of Brechin Cathedral from 1956.

== Notes ==
Scottish Episcopal Church titles
Preceded by Walter Harry de Voil	Dean of Brechin; 1964–1971	Succeeded by Ernest Hayes
