= John Sprott =

Anglican priest in the mid 20th century

The Right Reverend John Sprott
- Bishop of Brechin
- Church: Scottish Episcopal Church
- Diocese: Brechin
- In office: 1959-1975
- Predecessor: Eric Graham
- Successor: Ted Luscombe

Orders
- Ordination: 1928
- Consecration: 1959

Personal details
- Born: 16 October 1903
- Died: 11 November 1982 (aged 79)
- Denomination: Anglican
- Education: University of Glasgow

John Chappell Sprott (16 October 1903 – 11 November 1982) was an eminent Anglican priest in the mid 20th century.

He was educated at the University of Glasgow, graduating in 1925. His early working life was spent as a locomotive engineer and he retained an interest in railways throughout his life. He was ordained after a period of study at Edinburgh Theological College in 1928. His ecclesiastical career began as a Minor Canon and Succentor at St Mary's Cathedral, Edinburgh after which he held curacies at All Saints, Glasgow and St George the Martyr, Holborn. From 1933 to 1937 he was Rector of West Hackney and then Provost of St Paul's Cathedral, Dundee. His service at St Paul's marked the start of a 35-year association with the Diocese of Brechin, and in 1959 he became Bishop of Brechin, a post he held until his retirement in 1975 to make way for a younger man. He and his wife planned to retire to Troon.

Religious titles
Preceded by Kenneth Sutherland-Graeme	Provost of St Paul's Cathedral, Dundee; 1940–1959	Succeeded by Alastair Haggart
Preceded by Eric Graham	Bishop of Brechin; 1959–1975	Succeeded by Ted Luscombe
