= James Nicolson (priest) =

James Nicolson (1832–1889) was a Scottish cleric, Dean of Brechin from 1874 until his death on 25 January 1889.

Nicolson was educated at Aberdeen Grammar School, went on to Marischal College, Aberdeen and was ordained in 1857. His first post was Curate at St Mary Magdalene, Dundee and Chaplain to the Bishop of Brechin. He assisted David Greig's mission work in Dundee. After that he was the incumbent at St Salvador, Dundee, which he had helped to found in 1856 together with Alexander Penrose Forbes, Bishop Of Brechin.

== Notes ==
Scottish Episcopal Church titles
Preceded by Robert Thom	Dean of Brechin; 1874–1889	Succeeded by James Crabb
