= Ian Stewart (priest) =

The Rev Canon Ian Guild Stewart was Dean of Brechin from 2007 until 2008.

He was born in 1943, educated at Edinburgh Theological College and ordained in 1985. After curacies in Dundee he was the Rector of Montrose. He was a Canon of St Paul's Cathedral, Dundee from 2001 until 2008.

== Notes ==
Scottish Episcopal Church titles
Preceded by Robert William Breaden	Dean of Brechin; 2008 –2012	Succeeded by David Christopher Mumford
