= Nigel Peyton =

British Anglican bishop (born 1951)

The Right Reverend Nigel Peyton
- Bishop of Brechin
- Diocese: Diocese of Brechin
- Elected: 18 May 2011
- In office: 2011–2017
- Predecessor: John Mantle
- Successor: Andrew Swift

Orders
- Ordination: 1977
- Consecration: 8 October 2011 by David Chillingworth

Personal details
- Born: 5 February 1951 (age 75) London, England
- Denomination: Anglican
- Spouse: Anne Peyton

Nigel Peyton (born 5 February 1951) is a retired British Anglican bishop. From 2011 until 2017, he served as the Bishop of Brechin in the Scottish Episcopal Church.

== Early life and education ==
Born in London in 1951, he was educated at the University of Edinburgh, graduating with a Master of Arts degree in 1973 and a Bachelor of Divinity degree in 1976.

== Ordained ministry ==
He was ordained in the Anglican ministry as a deacon in 1976 and a priest in 1977. Between 1999 and 2011, he served as the Archdeacon of Newark in the Diocese of Southwell and Nottingham.

=== Episcopal ministry ===
He was elected the Bishop of Brechin, ordinary (diocesan bishop) of the Scottish Episcopal Church Diocese of Brechin on 18 May 2011. He was consecrated and installed in a special service at St Paul's Cathedral, Dundee on 8 October 2011. In March 2017 it was announced that Dr Peyton would retire as 50th Bishop of Brechin at the end of July, and the process to elect his successor began in September 2017.

In retirement, Peyton has been licensed as an honorary assistant bishop of the Diocese of Lincoln, England, since 2017.

Church of England titles
| Preceded by David Christopher Hawtin | Archdeacon of Newark; 1999–2011 | Succeeded by Peter Hill (acting) |
Scottish Episcopal Church titles
| Preceded by John Mantle | Bishop of Brechin; 2011–2017 | Succeeded by Andrew Swift |
