= Ernest Hayes (priest) =

Ernest Hayes was Dean of Brechin from 1971 until 1983.

He was educated at Durham University and ordained in 1932. He was a Curate at Pollokshields and then Priest in charge at St Barnabas, Dennistoun. He was Rector of Ballachulish from 1947 to 1950; and of Stonehaven from 1950. He was a Canon of St Paul's Cathedral, Dundee from 1964.

== Notes ==
Scottish Episcopal Church titles
Preceded by Matthew Sayer Gibson	Dean of Brechin; 1971–1983	Succeeded by Robert William Breaden
