= List of people from Broughty Ferry =

The following is a partial list of notable residents, past and present, from Broughty Ferry; a suburb of Dundee in Scotland.

== Journalism ==
- Alan Cochrane, journalist
- James Meek, journalist

== Media ==
- Hamish Clark, actor
- Heather Ripley, actress
- David Robertson, television broadcaster

== Music ==
- Roger Ball, musician
- Ricky Ross, musician

== Military ==
- Hugh Malcolm, Victoria Cross recipient
- Alistair Urquhart, soldier and businessman

== Politics ==
- Isabella Carrie, suffragist
- Douglas Craig, businessman and Conservative politician
- Frances Josephy, Liberal politician
- Lewis Moonie, Labour politician
- Charles Ritchie, 1st Baron Ritchie of Dundee, Conservative politician and Chancellor of the Exchequer
- George Thomson, Labour and later Liberal Democrat politician

== Law ==
- Colin Campbell, lawyer
- Sir Thomas Winsor, lawyer, economic regulator and police reformer

== Religion ==
- Robert Breaden, church minister
- Francis Bridger, church minister
- James Denney, theologian and preacher
- Thomas Dick, preacher and scientist
- Fraser McLuskey, Church of Scotland Minister
- Gordon Webster Free Church minister and later Moderator of the Presbyterian Church of New Zealand

== Sports ==
- David Brown, football player
- Joe Buick, football player
- Sir George Cunningham, rugby union player and colonial administrator
- Fred Erentz, football player
- Frank Glass, ice hockey player
- Alistair Gunn, football player
- Pat Harrower, rugby union player
- Jackie Knight, cricketer and football player
- Jim McLean, football player and manager
- Gibson McNaughton, football player and manager
- Fraser Milligan, football player
- Frank Munro, football player
- Iain Phillip, football player
- Davie Robb, football player
- Richard Sale, cricketer
- Bobby Seith, football player and manager
- George Sievwright, football player and manager

== Other ==
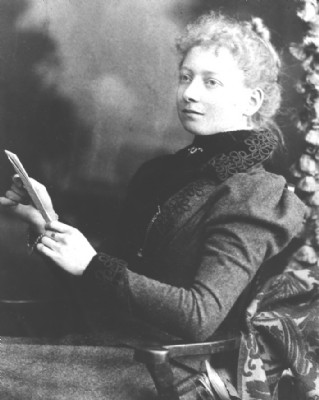
Janet Greig, circa 1900

- David Blair, Titanic crew member
- Pamela Butchart, teacher and children's author
- William Cruikshank, painter
- John Glenday, poet
- Janet Greig, anaesthetist
- Sir Francis Mudie, colonial administrator
- George Peden, historian
- Thomas Smith, lighthouse engineer
- Dudley D. Watkins, Comic Artist
- Leo Baxendale, Cartoonist
