= William Simons (priest) =

Rev. William Charles Simons (19 November 1844 – 7 January 1921) was an English Anglican priest who served as Dean of Brechin from 1913 until 1917.

The third son of The Rev. John Simons, sometime Vicar of Dymock, Gloucestershire, he was educated at the University of Oxford and ordained in 1868. After a curacy at Kirby Underdale he was Priest in charge at Knowle, Bristol. He was Rector of All Souls, Invergowrie from 1883; and Examining Chaplain to the Bishop of Brechin from 1906.

== Notes ==
Scottish Episcopal Church titles
Preceded by William Hatt	Dean of Brechin; 1913–1917	Succeeded by William Leslie Christie
