= Edith Sim =

British researcher and academic

- Born: Hilltown, Dundee
- Education: University of Oxford; Morgan Academy
- Scientific career
- Workplaces: University of Oxford; Kingston University

Edith Sim is a British researcher who is an emeritus professor at Kingston University and the University of Oxford. She was awarded the 2012 British Pharmacological Society John Vane Medal and a lifetime achievement award in 2015 from the Arylamine N-acetyltransferases Workshop Group.

== Early life and education ==
Sim was born and raised in Hilltown, Dundee. Her father Joe ran his own company repairing mechanical office equipment and her mother Edith Snr had worked as a seamstress before joining her husband in helping to run his business. She was an only child, and her grandmother died of tuberculosis. She attended Morgan Academy, where she was the only girl in her chemistry class. She eventually attended a short course at the University of Edinburgh in biochemistry, which motivated her to apply for an undergraduate degree. She moved to the University of Oxford as a doctoral researcher. After earning her doctorate she moved to Grenoble, where she worked as a postdoctoral researcher.

== Research and career ==
Sim's research is at the intersection of chemistry and biology. She joined the faculty at Oxford in 1983, where she was made Head of Pharmacology in 2000. She dedicated her career to understanding the enzyme in tuberculosis. She identified the structure of arylamine N-acetyltransferase and defined the mechanism of action using a catalytic triad. In 2010, Sim moved to Kingston University as dean of science, Engineering and Computing.

In 2012, Sim was awarded the British Pharmacological Society John Vane Medal. She was appointed to the governing body of Abertay University in 2022.

== Awards and honours ==
- 2012 John Vane Medal
- 2015 Lifetime achievement award from the Arylamine N-acetyltransferases Workshop Group

== Selected publications ==
- Seymour Garte; Laura Gaspari; Anna-Karin Alexandrie; et al. (1 December 2001). "Metabolic gene polymorphism frequencies in control populations". Cancer Epidemiology. 10 (12): 1239–1248. ISSN 1055-9965. PMID 11751440. Wikidata Q46857953.
- Robert Van der Geize; Katherine Yam; Thomas Heuser; et al. (30 January 2007). "A gene cluster encoding cholesterol catabolism in a soil actinomycete provides insight into Mycobacterium tuberculosis survival in macrophages". Proceedings of the National Academy of Sciences of the United States of America. 104 (6): 1947–1952. Bibcode:2007PNAS..104.1947V. doi:10.1073/pnas.0605728104. ISSN 0027-8424. PMC 1794314. PMID 17264217. Wikidata Q28486798.
- Kostas P. Vatsis; Wendell W. Weber; Douglas A. Bell; et al. (February 1995). "Nomenclature for N-acetyltransferases". Pharmacogenetics and Genomics. 5 (1): 1–17. doi:10.1097/00008571-199502000-00001. ISSN 1744-6872. PMID 7773298. Wikidata Q28302652.
