= Ted Luscombe =

British bishop (1924–2022)

The Right Reverend Ted Luscombe OStJ
- Bishop of Brechin; Primus of the Scottish Episcopal Church
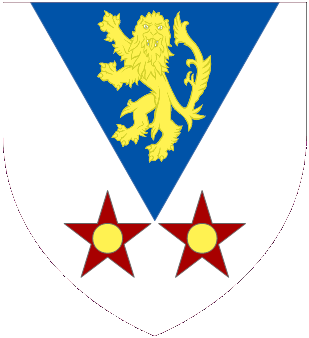
- Shield of arms
- Church: Scottish Episcopal Church
- Diocese: Brechin
- In office: 1975–1990
- Predecessor: John Sprott
- Successor: Robert Halliday
- Other post: Primus of the Scottish Episcopal Church (1985–1990)
- Previous post: Provost of St Paul's Cathedral, Dundee (1971–1975)

Orders
- Ordination: May 1964 by Francis Moncreiffe
- Consecration: 21 June 1975 by Richard Wimbush

Personal details
- Born: 10 November 1924 Torquay, Devon, England
- Died: 3 May 2022 (aged 97) Monifieth, Angus, Scotland
- Parents: Reginald and Winifred Luscombe
- Education: Torquay Boys' Grammar School
- Alma mater: King's College London; Kelham Theological College

Lawrence Edward Luscombe OStJ (10 November 1924 – 3 May 2022) was a British Anglican bishop and author. He was Bishop of Brechin from 1975 to 1990 and primus of the Scottish Episcopal Church from 1985 to 1990.

== Early life and education ==
Luscombe was educated at Torquay Boys' Grammar School, an all-boys state grammar school in Torquay, Devon. He studied at King's College London and Kelham Theological College.

== Career ==
=== Early career ===
Luscombe served during the Second World War in the Indian Army between 1942 and 1945. On 19 March 1944, he was granted an emergency commission as a second lieutenant. On 1 August 1945, he transferred to the Devonshire Regiment of the British Army with the rank of war substantive lieutenant.

Luscombe became an associate of the Institute of Chartered Accountants (ACA) in 1952 and worked as a chartered accountant until 1963.

=== Ordained ministry ===
Luscombe was ordained in the Scottish Episcopal Church as a deacon in 1963 and as a priest one year later in 1964. His ecclesiastical career began as a curate at St Margaret's Glasgow after which he was rector of St Barnabas' Paisley. From 1971 to 1975 he was provost of St Paul's Cathedral, Dundee.

In 1975, Luscombe was consecrated a bishop and appointed the 50th Bishop of Brechin. Ten years later he was additionally elected the Primus of the Scottish Episcopal Church, a post he held until his retirement in 1990.

=== Academic career ===
After retiring, he became an academic and author. He earned an MPhil and PhD research degrees from the University of Dundee where he remained an honorary research fellow in modern history.

== Personal life and death ==
Luscombe died on 3 May 2022, at the age of 97, after a long illness.

== Honours ==
In May 1981, Luscombe was appointed a Serving Brother of the Venerable Order of St John (SBStJ). In January 1986, he was promoted to Officer of the Venerable Order of St John (OStJ). In 1987 he was awarded the honorary degree of Doctor of Laws (LLD) by the University of Dundee.

== Selected works ==
- Matthew Luscombe, Missionary Bishop, 1992
- A Seminary of Learning, 1994
- "The Scottish Episcopal Church in the 20th Century, 1996
- Episcopacy in an Angus Glen, 2003
- Steps into Freedom, 2004
- Hands Across the Sea, 2006

Anglican Communion titles
Preceded by John Sprott	Bishop of Brechin; 1975–1990	Succeeded by Robert Halliday
Preceded by Alastair Haggart	Primus of the Scottish Episcopal Church; 1985–1990	Succeeded by George Henderson
