= Walter de Voil =

Walter Harry de Voil was Dean of Brechin from 1957 until 1964.

== Biography ==
De Voil served with the West Yorkshire Regiment during World War I. He was educated at Durham University where he gained Licentiate of Theology (LTh) in 1922. He studied at the University of Edinburgh where he graduated with an MA in 1923.

He was ordained in 1925 and his first post was a curacy at St Margaret, Lochee and then Chaplain at St Ninian's Cathedral, Perth. He was then Rector of St John Pittenweem; St Margaret Leven; and Holy Rood Carnoustie. In 1937 he gained a PhD from the University of Edinburgh.

From 1942 to 1949 he was vicar of Elsecar, Yorkshire.

In 1940, he married Mary Baxter. In 1942, the couple had a son, Cedric Walter Benedict, who went on to become a physician and received an MBE in 2010. De Voil became the legal guardian of Paul Walter Vogel, born in1929, who emigrated from Germany in 1935. Vogel was the son of his friend Paul Heinz Vogel, an Old Catholic priest and bible scholar.

== Notes ==
Scottish Episcopal Church titles
Preceded by Rudolph Henderson Howat	Dean of Brechin; 1957–1964	Succeeded by Matthew Sayer Gibson
