= Serotonin acetyltransferase =

Serotonin acetyltransferase may refer to:

- Arylamine N-acetyltransferase
- Serotonin N-acetyltransferase
