= Richard Holloway =

Scottish author and cleric (born 1933)

The Right Reverend Richard Holloway FRSE
- Bishop of Edinburgh; Primus of the Scottish Episcopal Church
- Church: Scottish Episcopal Church
- Diocese: Edinburgh
- In office: 1986–2000
- Predecessor: Alastair Haggart
- Successor: Brian Smith
- Other posts: Primus of the Scottish Episcopal Church (1992–2000); Gresham Professor of Divinity (1997–2002)

Orders
- Ordination: 1960 by Francis Moncreiff
- Consecration: 11 June 1986 by Ted Luscombe

Personal details
- Born: 26 November 1933 (age 92) Glasgow, Scotland
- Denomination: Anglicanism
- Education: Kelham Theological College; Edinburgh Theological College; Union Theological Seminary, New York City

Richard Holloway (born 26 November 1933) is a Scottish writer, broadcaster and cleric. He was the Bishop of Edinburgh from 1986 to 2000 and Primus of the Scottish Episcopal Church from 1992 to 2000.

== Early life and education ==
Holloway in conversation with Andrew Copson (Humanists UK) at Conway Hall in 2016

Born in Possilpark, Glasgow, and brought up in Alexandria in the Vale of Leven, Dumbartonshire, Holloway was educated at Kelham Theological College, Edinburgh Theological College and the Union Theological Seminary, New York City.

== Career ==
Between 1958 and 1986, Holloway was a curate, vicar and rector at various parishes in England, Scotland and the United States, including Old St Paul's Edinburgh from 1968 to 1980. He was Bishop of Edinburgh from 1986 and was elected Primus of the Scottish Episcopal Church in 1992. He resigned from these positions in 2000 and is now regarded as one of the most outspoken and controversial figures in the church, having taken an agnostic worldview and commenting widely on issues concerning religious belief in the modern world. His own theological position has become increasingly radical and he has described himself as an "after-religionist", with strong faith in humanity.

Holloway is well known for his support of progressive causes, including campaigning on human rights for gay and lesbian people in both church and state. He is a patron of LGBT Youth Scotland, an organisation dedicated to the inclusion of LGBT young people in the life of Scotland. He has questioned and addressed complex ethical issues in the areas of sexuality, drugs and bioethics. He has written extensively on these topics, being the author of more than 20 books exploring their relationship with modern religion.

Holloway was elected as a fellow of the Royal Society of Edinburgh (1997) and holds honorary degrees from the universities of Strathclyde (1994), Aberdeen (1997), Napier (2000), Glasgow (2002) and St Andrews (2017). He was professor of divinity at Gresham College in the City of London. From 1990 to 1997, he was a member of the Human Fertilisation and Embryology Authority and held the position of chair of the British Medical Association's Steering Group on Ethics and Genetics. He was also a member of the Broadcasting Standards Commission and is a former chair of the Scottish Arts Council and Sistema Scotland.

Holloway has been a reviewer and writer for the broadsheet press for several years, including The Times, The Guardian, The Independent, Sunday Herald and The Scotsman. He is also a frequent presenter on radio and television, having hosted the BBC television series When I Get to Heaven, Holloway's Road and The Sword and the Cross. He currently hosts the BBC Radio Scotland book review programme Cover Stories. He presented the second of the Radio 4 Lent Talks on 11 March 2009. On 28 May 2012 he began presenting a 15-minute programme about faith and doubt, following The World at One on Radio 4, called Honest Doubt: The History of an Epic Struggle and in 2016 he presented the Radio 4 series Three Score Years and Ten, a reflection on human mortality.

His 2012 book, Leaving Alexandria: A Memoir of Faith and Doubt, talks about his life from childhood, and his 2016 book, A Little History of Religion (published by Yale University Press), has received positive reviews from Peter Stanford of The Observer, Ian Thomson of The Financial Times ("exhaustive account"), Stuart Kelly of The Scotsman and John Charmley of The Sunday Times ("Holloway's technique, like his prose, beguiles"), among others. His book Waiting For The Last Bus was published in early 2018 and contains his reflections upon death and mortality. It has been praised for its "erudite quotes" on the subject. His 2021 book, The Heart of Things, is a personal reflection on his life with extracts from favourite poems. In the final chapter, on forgiving, he stresses that people can read their lives through the prism of heroism or defeat or resignation or shame. Only admitting their own weakness will make people kind, help them identify with others and act kin to kin. In his closing verses he concludes that, in the absence of certainty about God or an afterlife, "I, who walked the hills, I, who saw white hares dancing in the snow on Lammermuir, should be grateful for life, even as it passes."

In his 2024 book, On Reflection: Looking for Life's Meaning, he thinks back on some of the questions that have shaped his life. With the help of poets, writers, musicians and artists, Holloway offers his reflections on how a good life is one inspired by love and guided by knowledge.

== Personal life ==
Holloway lives in Edinburgh with his American-born wife Jean. They have three adult children: two daughters and a son.

== Selected works ==
- Let God Arise (Morehouse-Barlow, 1972) ISBN 9780264645988
- A New Heaven (William B. Eerdmans, 1978)
- Beyond Belief: The Christian Encounter with God (Eerdmans, 1982) ISBN 9780802835581
- Paradoxes of Christian Faith and Life (Mowbray, 1984) ISBN 9780264670058
- The Way of the Cross (1987)
- Crossfire: Faith and Doubt in an Age of Uncertainty (HarperCollins, 1987) ISBN 9780002152440
- (editor) Who Needs Feminism? Male Responses to Sexism in the Church (SPCK, 1990) ISBN 9780281045433
- Anger, Sex, Doubt and Death (SPCK, 1992) ISBN 9780281046164
- Dancing on the Edge: Faith in a Post-Christian Age (Harper Collins, 1997) ISBN 9780006280415
- Godless Morality: Keeping Religion out of Ethics (Canongate Canons, 2000) ISBN 9781786893918
- Doubts and Loves: What is Left of Christianity (Canongate, 2000) ISBN 9781841951799
- On Forgiveness: How Can We Forgive the Unforgivable? (Canongate Canons, 2002) ISBN 9781782116288
- Looking in the Distance: The Human Search for Meaning (Canongate Canons, 2004) ISBN 9781786893932
- How To Read The Bible (W.W. Norton, 2006) ISBN 9780393329544
- Between the Monster and the Saint: Reflections on the Human Condition (Canongate, 2012) ISBN 9781847672537
- Leaving Alexandria: A Memoir of Faith and Doubt (Canongate Canons, 2014) ISBN 9781786898913
- A Little History of Religion (Yale University Press, 2016) ISBN 9780300283228
  - Breve storia delle religioni (Ponte alle Grazie)
- Waiting For The Last Bus (Canongate, 2018) ISBN 9781786890245
- Stories We Tell Ourselves: Making Meaning in a Meaningless Universe (Canongate, 2020) ISBN 9781786899965
- The Heart of Things: An Anthology of Memory and Lament (Canongate, 2021) ISBN 9781838854959
- On Reflection: Looking for Life's Meaning (Canongate, 2024) ISBN 9781805302919
- Last Words ISBN 9781800755338

Religious titles
Preceded by Alastair Iain Macdonald Haggart	Bishop of Edinburgh; 1986–2000	Succeeded by Brian Arthur Smith
Preceded by George Henderson	Primus of the Scottish Episcopal Church; 1992–2000	Succeeded by Bruce Cameron
