= John Hepburn =

John Hepburn may refer to:

- John Herspolz (died 1485/7), bishop of Dunblane, also known as John Hepburn
- John Hepburn (prior) (died after July 1525), Prior of St Andrews and Archbishop-elect of St Andrews
- John Hepburn (bishop) (died 1557), Bishop of Brechin
- John Hepburn (soldier) (c. 1598–1636), Scottish soldier who fought in wars in continental Europe
- John Stuart Hepburn (1800–1860), pioneer squatter in Victoria, Australia
