= Kenneth Sutherland =

Kenneth Sutherland may refer to:

- Kenneth Sutherland (cyclist), Belizean cyclist
- Kenneth F. Sutherland, American politician from New York
- Kenneth Sutherland, 3rd Lord Duffus, Scottish noble

== See also ==
- Ken Sutherland, composer, lyricist, playwright and artist
- Kenneth Sutherland-Graeme, Anglican priest
