= Alastair Haggart =

Scottish bishop

The Right Reverend Alastair Haggart
- Bishop of Edinburgh; Primus of the Scottish Episcopal Church
- Church: Scottish Episcopal Church
- Diocese: Edinburgh
- Elected: 1975
- In office: 1975–1985
- Predecessor: Kenneth Carey
- Successor: Richard Holloway
- Other post: Primus of the Scottish Episcopal Church (1977–1985)

Orders
- Ordination: 1942 by John How
- Consecration: 5 December 1975 by Richard Wimbush

Personal details
- Born: 10 October 1915 Glasgow, Scotland
- Died: 11 January 1998 (aged 82) Edinburgh, Scotland
- Denomination: Anglican
- Parents: Alexander Macdonald Haggart & Janet Mackay
- Spouse: Margaret Trundle (1945–1979); Mary Scholes (1983–1998)
- Children: 2
- Education: Durham University

Alastair Iain Macdonald Haggart (10 October 1915 – 11 January 1998) was an eminent Anglican priest.

== Biography ==
Haggart was born on 10 October 1915 and brought up in Fort William. Raised in the Free Church of Scotland, he became an Episcopalian in his early 20s and trained for ministry at Edinburgh Theological College. From there he won an open exhibition to Hatfield College, Durham and graduated with a BA in 1941, and proceeded to an MA four years later. He married Peggy Trundle, a typist, and had two daughters.

As a student, his political convictions were left wing and pacifist. In reaction to the Spanish Civil War, he signed the Peace Pledge. He was active in the Labour Club at Durham as well as the Union.

== Career ==
Haggart was ordained in 1941 and served curacies at St Mary's Cathedral, Glasgow and St Mary's, Hendon. From 1948 to 1951, he was precentor of St Ninian's Cathedral, Perth. He subsequently served as rector of St Oswald's, King's Park, Glasgow, and as acting priest-in-charge of St Martin's, Glasgow. In 1959, he was appointed provost of St Paul's Cathedral, Dundee, remaining there until 1969, when he became principal and Pantonian Professor of Edinburgh Theological College.

He became Bishop of Edinburgh in 1975 and Primus of the Episcopal Church in Scotland in 1977, retiring from both posts in 1985.

Religious titles
Preceded by John Sprott	Provost of St Paul's Cathedral, Dundee; 1959–1969	Succeeded by Ted Luscombe
Preceded by Kenneth Carey	Bishop of Edinburgh; 1975–1985	Succeeded by Richard Holloway
Preceded by Richard Wimbush	Primus of the Scottish Episcopal Church; 1977–1985	Succeeded by Ted Luscombe
