= Kenneth Mackenzie (bishop of Brechin) =

Scottish Anglican priest and author

The Right Reverend Kenneth Mackenzie
- Bishop of Brechin
- Church: Scottish Episcopal Church
- Diocese: Brechin
- In office: 1935–1943
- Predecessor: Walter Robberds
- Successor: Eric Graham

Orders
- Ordination: 1902
- Consecration: 1935

Personal details
- Born: 16 September 1876
- Died: 1 October 1966 (aged 90)
- Denomination: Anglican

Kenneth Donald Mackenzie (16 September 1876 – 1 October 1966) was an eminent Anglican priest and author in the middle third of the 20th century.

He was educated at Radley and Hertford College, Oxford and ordained in 1902. He served curacies at All Hallows', East India Docks and St John's, Upper Norwood. From 1905 to 1910 he was Fellow, Dean and Chaplain of Pembroke College, Oxford. After a further curacy at St Mary Magdalene's, Paddington he became Vicar of Selly Oak in 1915, a post he held for five years. From 1923 to 1934 he worked for the Anglo-Catholic Congress. After that he was a canon residentiary at Salisbury Cathedral until his consecration to the episcopate as Bishop of Brechin, serving until 1943.

Religious titles
Preceded by Walter John Forbes Robberds	Bishop of Brechin; 1935 – 1943	Succeeded by Eric Graham
