= William Meldrum =

William Meldrum may refer to:

- William Meldrum (bishop) (died 1514/16), prelate in Scotland
- William Meldrum (general) (1865–1964), New Zealand lawyer, farmer, military leader, magistrate and local politician
