= Coupar Angus Abbey =

Cistercian monastery in Scotland, 1162–1606

Coordinates: 56°33′N 3°16′W

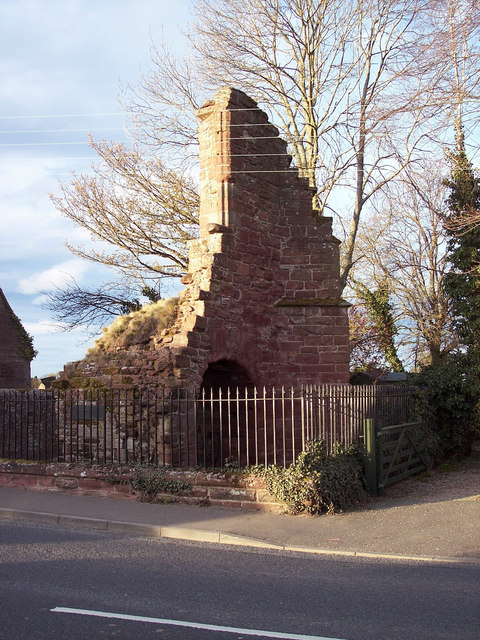
- The gatehouse of Coupar Angus Abbey
- Interactive map of Coupar Angus Abbey

Monastery information
- Full name: Abbey of the Blessed Virgin Mary of Coupar
- Order: Cistercian
- Established: 1162
- Disestablished: 1606
- Mother house: Melrose Abbey
- Dedication: Virgin Mary
- Diocese: Diocese of St Andrews
- Controlled churches: Airlie; Alvah; Bendochy; Dunnottar (?); Errol; Fossoway; Glenisla; Inchmartin; Meathie

People
- Founders: Máel Coluim IV, King of the Scots
- Important associated figures: William de Benin, Thomas Livingston, Donald Campbell

Site
- Location: Coupar Angus, Scotland
- Visible remains: Only partial remains of the gatehouse

Coupar Angus Abbey was a Cistercian monastery near Coupar Angus, in central Scotland, on the boundary between Angus and Gowrie.

It was founded on the old royal manor of Coupar in 1161 to 1162 with the patronage of Máel Coluim IV ("Malcolm IV"), King of Scots, by Cistercian monks from Melrose Abbey. However, it may not have been fully established until 1164. The buildings must have been largely completed by 1233, when the church was dedicated. In the 1230s it acquired a salt pan at Altens on the coast to the south of Aberdeen, with access to a peatery sufficient to fuel it.

Coupar Angus became an abbey of medium to large size and wealth and enjoyed more than four centuries of monastic life. In the 14th century it suffered in the wars with England, one of its granges reportedly being burnt by Edward I in 1305. In 1351 the buildings were described in a papal bull as "exceedingly impoverished." Its fortunes revived later in the middle ages, with at least 24 monks at the Reformation and an income of £5590. This made it the wealthiest Cistercian house in Scotland. In 1559 the abbey was entrusted by Abbot Donald Campbell to his friend Katherine Campbell, Countess of Crawford. Under Donald Campbell religious life appears to have been maintained at high standards, though he joined the Reformation in 1559.

The abbey was turned into a secular lordship for James Elphinstone, by parliament in 1606 and by royal charter in 1607. The abbey church appears to have survived for a time as the parish church. However, from the death of Lord Coupar in 1669 it is likely that the buildings were dismantled for stone. Today, there are almost no remains of the abbey, much of it being burned by the Protestant reformers. A collection of its charters has survived. There is a heavily ruined gatehouse, and some fine fragmentary stonework from the Abbey (notably a number of tombs) is preserved in the present parish church, which stands on or near the site of the medieval building. Other fragments are built into walls throughout the modern town.

The original layout of the abbey remains conjectural; a drawing of 1820 held in the National Library of Scotland allegedly showing the plan has been found to be incorrect.

In the 19th century some women allegedly found the Ley tunnel of Coupar Angus Abbey near the entrance to the churchyard. One went in and was never seen again, however in 1982 a local mason found the entrance again and went in some distance before finding a cave-in. It is said (without evidence) that the tunnel ran a further two and a half miles to a souterrain at Pitcur.

Both the Abbey gatehouse and the Abbey precincts are separately designated as scheduled monuments.

== See also ==
- Abbot of Coupar Angus, for a list of abbots and commendators

== Bibliography ==
- Cowan, Ian B. & Easson, David E., Medieval Religious Houses: Scotland With an Appendix on the Houses in the Isle of Man, Second Edition, (London, 1976), pp. 73–4
- Easson, D.E., Charters of the Abbey of Coupar Angus, 2 vols., Publications of the Scottish History Society. 3rd series; v. 40-41, (Edinburgh, 1947)
- Watt, D.E.R. & Shead, N.F. (eds.), The Heads of Religious Houses in Scotland from the 12th to the 16th Centuries, The Scottish Records Society, New Series, Volume 24, (Edinburgh, 2001), pp. 43–7
