= Rudolph Henderson-Howat =

Scottish Episcopalian priest

Rudolph Henderson-Howat (11 September 1896 – 14 May 1957) was a Scottish Episcopalian priest who was Dean of Brechin from 1953 until his death in 1957.

Henderson-Howat was born in Le Vésinet, Yvelines, France, the son of Barclay Henderson-Howat and Annie Tate. He was educated at St David's College, Lampeter and ordained in 1924. He was a Curate at All Saints, Wigan and then Precentor at St Mary's Cathedral, Edinburgh (Episcopal). After this he was Priest in charge of St Barnabas, Dennistoun then Rector of St John Girvan. From 1930 he was Rector of All Souls, Invergowrie.

Henderson-Howat was also editor of two of the Scottish Episcopal Church's newspapers, Scottish Guardian and Scottish Sentinel. He died suddenly in 1957 following an annual church council meeting at an Aberdeen hotel. His widow, writer Agatha Cooke Henderson-Howat, died in 1990. They had two sons, Gerald and Nigel, and a daughter, Angela.

Scottish Episcopal Church titles
| Preceded by John Dixon Mowat | Dean of Brechin; 1957–1964 | Succeeded by Walter de Voil |
