= Hilltown, Dundee =

Area of Dundee, Scotland

Coordinates: 56.468195°N 2.975431°W

Hilltown: Scottish Gaelic: Baile nan Cnoc; Scots: The Hulltoun
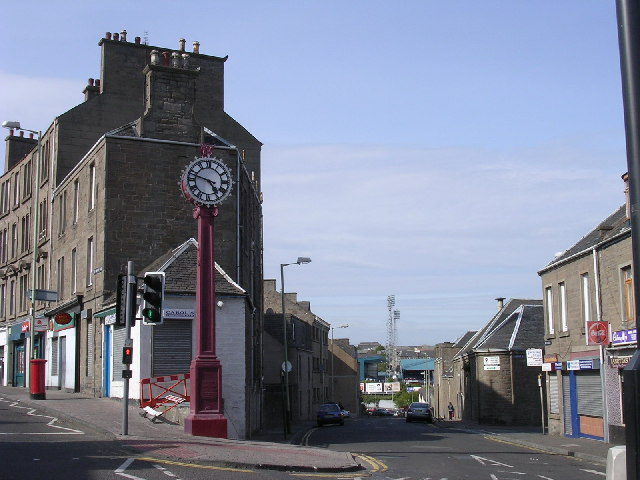
- Hilltown

- Location within Dundee City council area Location within Scotland
- Population: 10,592
- OS grid reference: NO400311
- Council area: Dundee City
- Lieutenancy area: Dundee
- Country: Scotland
- Sovereign state: United Kingdom
- Post town: DUNDEE
- Postcode district: DD3
- Dialling code: 01382
- Police: Scotland
- Fire: Scottish
- Ambulance: Scottish
- UK Parliament: Dundee East Dundee West
- Scottish Parliament: Dundee City East Dundee City West

Hilltown (or informally, The Hilltown, Scots pronunciation: [ðə ˈhɪɫ ˌtun]) in Dundee, Scotland, is a mainly residential area to the north of the City Centre and lying to the south of the main circular road.

== Demographics ==
In the 2001 census the population was 9,337, by 2011 the census recorded 6,408 following major demolition of 1960s and 70s council built multi storeys and 6-in-a-block flats.

The majority of Hilltown housing is mainly three to four storey tenement buildings as well as four tower blocks. This is shown in the census which states that flats are the main housing facility in the Hilltown at 82.0%.

According to the 2022 census, the ethnic makeup of the wider Coldside ward (which includes the Hilltown) was 85.9% White, 8.8% Asian, 2.4% African or Caribbean, 1.3% mixed or multiple ethnic groups, and 1.6% from other ethnic backgrounds.

== Area and boundary description ==
Demolition of the Alexander Street multi-storey flats ("multis") in Dundee's Hilltown on 31 July 2011

Hilltown is a true inner city location. Situated on the edge of the city centre with the Law to the north, the Hilltown area offers excellent views across the River Tay and beyond. Hilltown is one of the oldest parts of the city. This makes it distinctive from other areas in Dundee both physically and demographically. It is an area of Dundee where the effects of the decline of traditional industry have been easily identifiable. Hilltown was once a bustling place of work in the jute industry and provided accessible housing for many of the mill workers but now is mainly a residential area with a central shopping concourse running through the spine. However, these shops are somewhat in decline due to accessibility of new shopping malls within the town centre.

Most of the high-rise blocks were demolished, which has given rise to regeneration in the area. Four of the largest tower blocks (locally known as the 'Alexander Street Multis') were demolished on 31 July 2011. Butterburn Court and Bucklemaker Court were demolished on 30 June 2013.

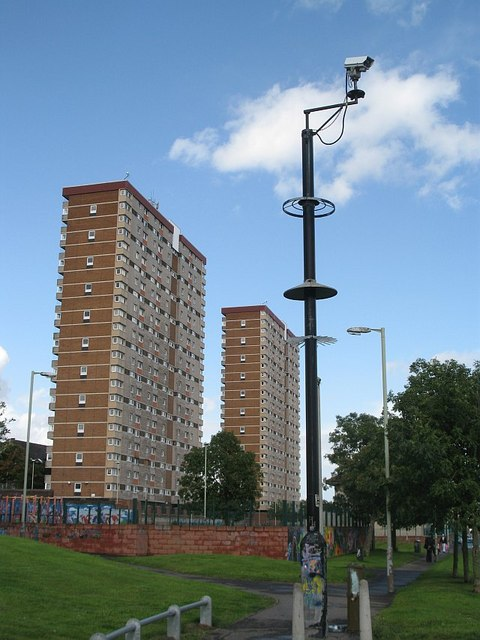
Two of the four aforementioned Alexander Street Multis

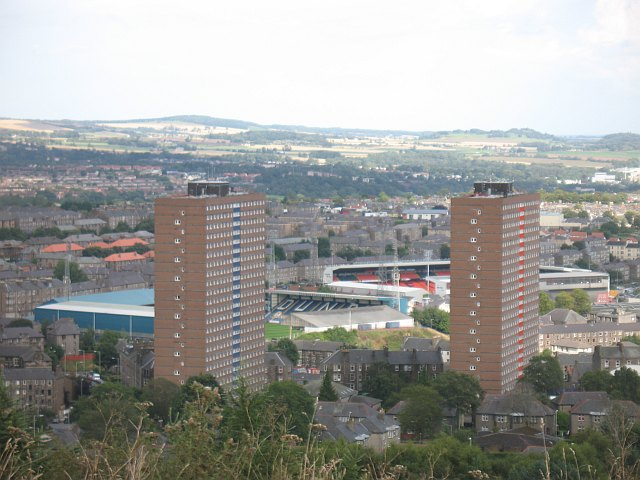
Butterburn and Bucklemaker Courts

Public open spaces and play areas have been provided at various locations across the area. The Hilltown Park was opened in September 2008 as an urban park that will attract local people and visitors to enjoy the open space available.

== Education ==
There are four primary schools in the Hilltown:

- Our Lady's RC Primary School
- Rosebank Primary School
- Dens Road Primary School
- St Peter & Paul RC Primary School

Also the Constitution Road Campus of Dundee College was in the Hilltown.

== History and future ==
The area has a poor or 'interesting' reputation which began in Medieval Times, when merchant and traders offered 'free trade' outside the city walls. The unwelcome (or undesirables) were kept out of the city and eventually it became part of Dundee. It has had a chequered past over the years but is redefining its identity and large developments of modern apartments including low cost housing and recreational facilities are springing up in quick succession.

The Episcopal St Salvador’s Church was founded in the area in 1856 by Alexander Penrose Forbes, Bishop Of Brechin and the Reverend James Nicolson. It was primarily designed to serve as a mission to the many mill workers living in and around the Hilltown area. The building was completed and consecrated in 1874. At one time the church also had a school. The church continues its work to aid the poor of Dundee, running a busy food bank. The Maxwell Community Centre and Garden* has been bringing community together in the Hilltown Park and the garden local people via their support work, youth work and community garden outreach with an average footfall of 2000 visits every month.

== Notable people ==
- Rev. Thomas Dick (1774–1857), church minister, science teacher, writer and astronomer.
- John Duncan (1866–1945), symbolist painter of Arthurian legends, Celtic folklore and other mythological subjects
- Ethel Moorhead (1869–1955), suffragette and painter; lived campaigned in Dundee early 20th C.
- George Kidd (1925–1998), a professional wrestler and TV broadcaster.

== Crime ==
Despite its 'dodgy' reputation, Hilltown ranks as 4th (out of 8 council Wards) in Dundee for its crime rate as of 2024.
