= William Christie (dean of Brechin) =

Scottish priest

William Leslie Christie was Dean of Brechin from 1917 until 1931.

Christie was born in 1858 and was the son of the clergyman William Christie, then incumbent of the Episcopal Church at Fochabers and the Dean of Moray, Ross and Caithness. He was educated at the University of Aberdeen and Edinburgh Theological College and ordained in 1882. After curacies in Edinburgh and Hornsey he was Rector of Stonehaven from 1890 until his death in 1931.

Some of his papers, including many transcripts he made of parish registers and research notes into the history of the Brechin Diocese, are held by Archive Services at the University of Dundee.

Scottish Episcopal Church titles
Preceded by William Simons	Dean of Brechin; 1917–1931	Succeeded by John Macrae
