= John Mantle (bishop) =

The Right Reverend John Mantle
- Bishop of Brechin
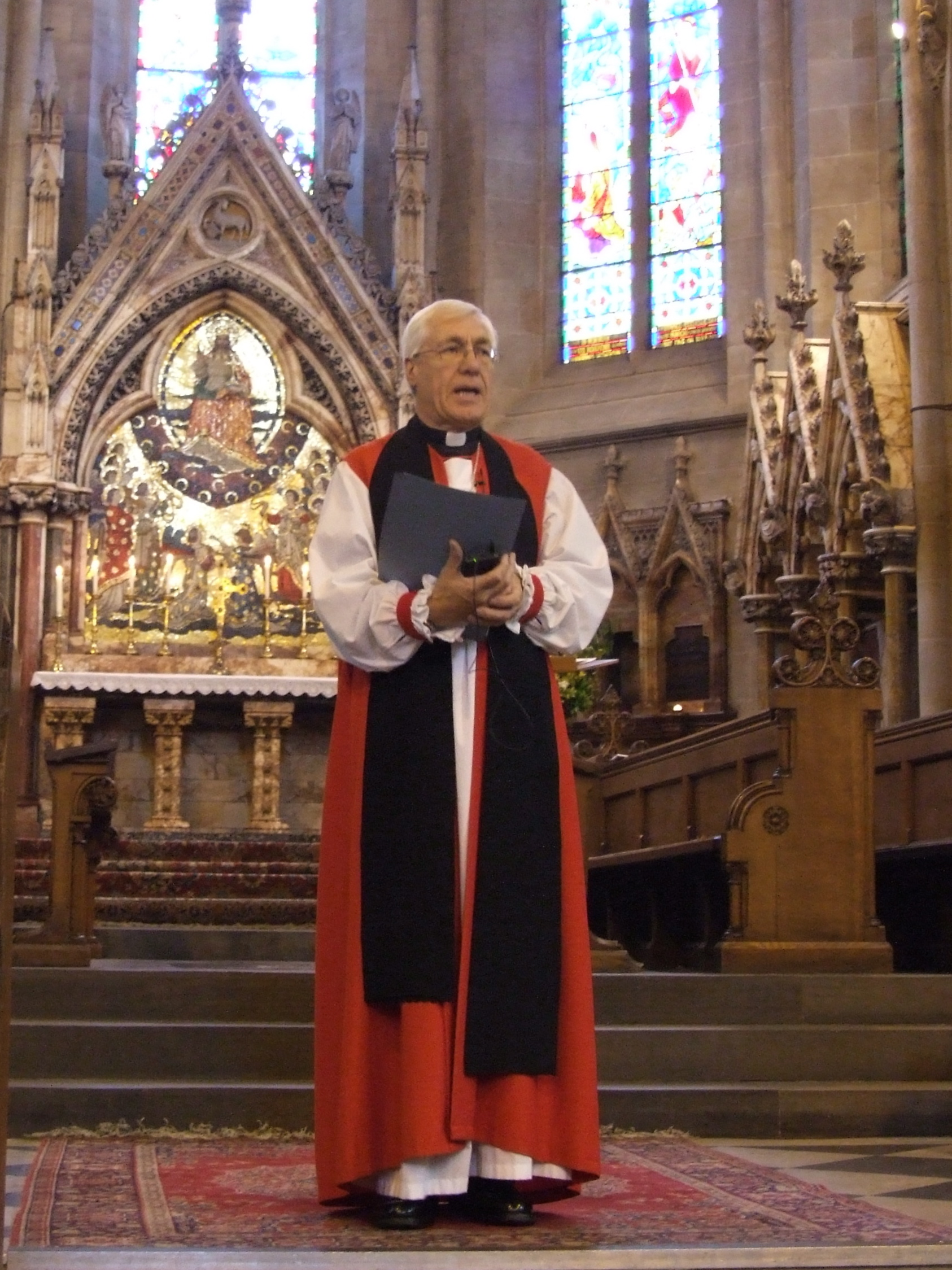
- Mantle at the Cathedral Church of St Paul, Dundee
- Church: Scottish Episcopal Church
- Diocese: Brechin
- Elected: 2005
- In office: 2005-2010
- Predecessor: Neville Chamberlain
- Successor: Nigel Peyton

Orders
- Ordination: 1970
- Consecration: 8 October 2005 by Bruce Cameron

Personal details
- Born: 3 April 1946 Aberdeen, Aberdeenshire, Scotland
- Died: 29 November 2010 (aged 64) Peterborough, Cambridgeshire, England
- Denomination: Anglican
- Parents: Rupert Mantle
- Spouse: Gillian Armstrong
- Children: 2
- Education: University of St Andrews

John Ambrose Cyril Mantle (3 April 1946 – 29 November 2010) was the Bishop of Brechin in the Scottish Episcopal Church.

== Ministry ==
Mantle was born in 1946 in Brechin, the son of an Episcopal (SEC) priest with a long ministry in Dundee and Aberdeen. John Mantle trained for ordination at the Edinburgh Theological College and was ordained deacon in Brechin diocese in 1969, and priest the following year. He served in the Scottish Episcopal Church until 1980, and thereafter in the Church of England until he returned to Scotland on his appointment to the episcopate. In 1980, he became Chaplain of Fitzwilliam College, Cambridge, moving to become staff tutor and Vice Principal of the Canterbury School of Ministry in 1986. He served as Director of Adult Education for the Diocese of Chichester from 1994 to 1999, and was then the Archbishops’ Adviser for Bishops’ Ministry in the Church of England for six years before his election as a bishop in 2005.

Mantle did not begin life as an academic, and was ordained as a non-graduate, subsequently taking a degree in theology from the University of St Andrews. In 1990 he was awarded an honorary degree by the University of Kent and in 1998 he completed his Doctor of Philosophy (PhD) with the University of Leeds, writing a dissertation on British worker-priests in the early 1950s and 1960s (later published by SCM).

He was consecrated Bishop of Brechin on Saturday 8 October 2005, aged 59. Owing to ill health he retired in October 2010, dying only a few weeks later.

== Family life ==
John Mantle was married to Gill Mantle, and they had two children Anna and Tim. In retirement they established their family home in Peterborough, approximately 75 miles (121 km) due north of London.

John Mantle died in Peterborough on 29 November 2010.

== Styles ==
- The Reverend John Mantle (1969–1998)
- The Reverend Doctor John Mantle (1998–2005)
- The Right Reverend Doctor John Mantle (2005–2010)

(Academic Style:)

- The Right Reverend John Mantle

== Books ==
- Mantle, John (1999). Britain's First Worker-Priests: Radical Ministry in a Post-War Setting. London: SCM. ISBN 0-334-02798-5.
