= David Strachan =

David Strachan may refer to:

- David Edgar Strachan (1919–1970), Australian painter
- David P. Strachan, British professor of epidemiology
- David Strachan (bishop) (died 1671), bishop of Brechin, Dundee
- David William Strachan (1877–1958), Canadian politician
