= Robert Breaden =

Scottish priest

The Rev Canon Robert William Breaden was Dean of Brechin from 1984 until 2007.

He was born on 7 November 1937, educated at The King's Hospital and ordained in 1962. He was a Curate at Broughty Ferry and then Rector of the Church of the Holy Rood, Carnoustie from 1965 to 1972. That year he returned to Broughty Ferry and also became a Canon of St Paul's Cathedral, Dundee.

He died on 3 July 2025.

Records relating to his incumbency at St Mary's are held by Archive Services at the University of Dundee, as part of the archives of the Brechin Diocese.

== Notes ==
Scottish Episcopal Church titles
Preceded by Ernest Hayes	Dean of Brechin; 1984–2007	Succeeded by Ian Guild Stewart
