= Nicholas of Brechin =

Bishop of Brechin

Nicholas
- Bishop of Brechin
- See: Brechin
- In office: 1297–1298
- Predecessor: William de Kilconquhar
- Successor: John de Kininmund
- Previous post(s): Sub-Dean of Brechin

Personal details
- Born: unknown unknown
- Died: 1298 (likely) unknown

Nicholas (died c. 1298) was a Scottish churchman and prelate active at the end of the 13th century. While holding the office of sub-dean of Brechin Cathedral, he got provided bishop of Brechin by Pope Boniface VIII on 21 January 1297.

A concurrent mandate was sent, significantly, to John Balliol, King of the Scots rather than Edward I.

He was consecrated on the same day by Giovanni Boccamazza, Cardinal-Bishop of Tusculum.

Bishop Nicholas is known only from papal documents, and his episcopate was short. Although there is no date for Nicholas' death, he had died by 1 June 1298, when his successor John de Kininmund was appointed Brechin bishop.

He is the first known holder of the office of sub-dean of Brechin, though not necessarily the first; holders of this office are poorly recorded, the next known holder being the mid-14th-century William de Forres.

Catholic Church titles
Preceded by William de Kilconquhar	Bishop of Brechin; 1297–1298	Succeeded by John de Kininmund
