= Hugh Jermyn =

English Anglican bishop (1820–1903)

The Right Reverend Hugh Jermyn D.D.
- Bishop of Brechin; Primus of the Scottish Episcopal Church
- Church: Scottish Episcopal Church
- Diocese: Brechin
- In office: 1875–1903
- Predecessor: Alexander Forbes
- Successor: Walter Robberds
- Other post: Primus of the Scottish Episcopal Church (1886–1901)
- Previous post: Bishop of Colombo (1871-1875)

Orders
- Ordination: 1845
- Consecration: 28 October 1871 by Archibald Campbell Tait

Personal details
- Born: 25 August 1820 Swaffham Prior, Cambridgeshire, England
- Died: 17 September 1903 (aged 83) Dundee, Scotland
- Denomination: Anglican
- Parents: George Bitton & Catherine Rowland
- Spouse: Ellen Scudamore (m.1844); Sophia Henrietta Ogle (m.1879)
- Education: Trinity Hall, Cambridge

Hugh Willoughby Jermyn (25 August 1820 – 17 September 1903) was an Anglican bishop in the second half of the 19th century and the very start of the 20th.

== Biography ==
He was born in Swaffham, the son of George Bitton Jermyn, and educated at Westminster and Trinity Hall, Cambridge. Ordained in 1845, his career began as a curate at Kensington Parish Church after which he was incumbent of St John's, Forres. Following this he was Dean of Moray & Ross then Archdeacon of Saint Kitts. He returned to Britain in 1858 to be Rural Dean of Dunster before being appointed Vicar of Barking. In 1871 he was elevated to the episcopate as the 3rd Anglican Bishop of Colombo and in 1875 translated to Brechin. Eleven years later he became Primus of Scotland, a post he held until 1901. He died on 17 September 1903.

Archive Services at the University of Dundee hold papers relating to Jermyn's election as Bishop of Brechin.

Anglican Communion titles
Preceded by Piers Calverley Claughton	Bishop of Colombo; 1871 – 1875	Succeeded by Reginald Stephen Copleston
Preceded by Alexander Penrose Forbes	Bishop of Brechin; 1875 – 1903	Succeeded by Walter John Forbes Robberds
Preceded by Robert Eden	Primus of the Scottish Episcopal Church; 1886 – 1901	Succeeded by James Butler Knill Kelly
