= Walter Robberds =

Scottish Anglican bishop (1863–1944)

The Right Reverend Walter Robberds
- Bishop of Brechin; Primus of the Scottish Episcopal Church
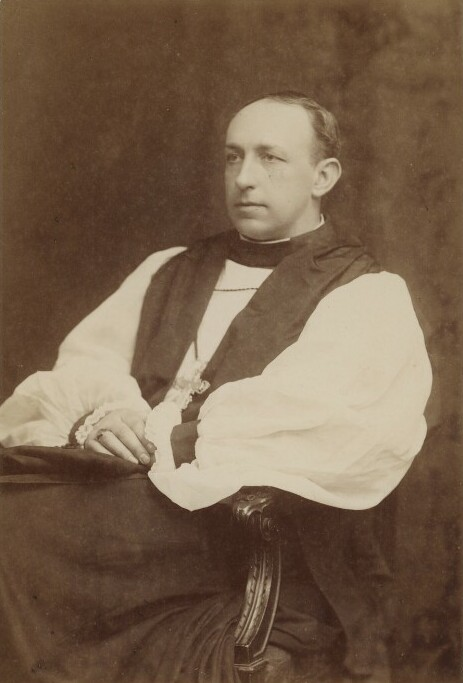
- Robberds c. 1900s
- Church: Scottish Episcopal Church
- Diocese: Brechin
- In office: 1904–1934
- Predecessor: Hugh Jermyn
- Successor: Kenneth Mackenzie
- Other post: Primus of the Scottish Episcopal Church (1908–1934)

Orders
- Ordination: 1888 by Charles Ellicott
- Consecration: 6 January 1904 by James Kelly

Personal details
- Born: 6 September 1863 Baharampur, India
- Died: 16 August 1944 (aged 80) Royal Tunbridge Wells, England
- Denomination: Anglican
- Parents: Frederick Walter Robberds; Caroline Ann Forbes
- Spouse: May Ethel Fox James (m. 1896)
- Children: 4

Walter John Forbes Robberds (1863–1944) was a Scottish Anglican bishop.

== Life and ministry ==
He was born on 6 September 1863 in Baharampur. He was educated at Trinity College, Glenalmond, and Keble College, Oxford. He was ordained deacon after studying at Ripon College Cuddesdon in 1887 in Gloucester and priest in 1888 in Bristol. His career began as a curate at St Mary Redcliffe, Bristol after which he was Chaplain of his old theological college. He then held incumbencies at St German's, Blackheath St Mary's, Arbroath and St Mary Redcliffe where additionally he was also Rural Dean of Bedminster. In 1904 he was ordained to the episcopate as the Bishop of Brechin Four years later he became Primus of Scotland, a post he held until his retirement in 1934. He died on 16 August 1944.

Anglican Communion titles
Preceded by Hugh Jermyn	Bishop of Brechin; 1904–1934	Succeeded by Kenneth Mackenzie
Preceded by George Wilkinson	Primus of the Scottish Episcopal Church; 1908–1934	Succeeded by Arthur Maclean
