= William Hatt =

Scottish priest, Dean of Brechin

William Hatt was Dean of Brechin from 1891 until his death on 29 April 1913: he was Rector of Muchalls from 1865 until 1911, when he died.

== Notes ==
Scottish Episcopal Church titles
Preceded by James Crabb	Dean of Brechin; 1917–1931	Succeeded by William Charles Simons
