= James Crabb (priest) =

James Crabb (1830–1891) was Dean of Brechin from 1889 until his death on 24 August 1891.

Crabb was educated at the University of St Andrews and ordained in 1854. He was curate in charge at Lanark then held incumbencies at Pittenweem and Brechin. He was also Chaplain to the Provincial Grand Lodge of Forfarshire.

== Notes ==
Scottish Episcopal Church titles
Preceded by James Nicolson	Dean of Brechin; 1889–1891	Succeeded by William Hatt
