= David Mumford (priest) =

David Christopher Mumford was Dean of Brechin from 2008 until 2012.

He was born on 14 January 1947, educated at Merton College, Oxford and ordained in 1987. After curacies in Shiremoor and North Shields he was Vicar of Byker then Cowgate. He was Co-ordinator of the International Fellowship of Reconciliation from 2002 until 2007, since when he has been the Rector of Brechin.

== Notes ==
Scottish Episcopal Church titles
Preceded by Ian Guild Stewart	Dean of Brechin; 2008 –2012	Succeeded by Francis William Bridger
