= Robert Halliday (bishop) =

Scottish Anglican priest (1932–2025)

The Right Reverend Robert Halliday
- Bishop Emeritus of Brechin
- Church: Scottish Episcopal Church
- Diocese: Brechin
- In office: 1990–1997
- Predecessor: Ted Luscombe
- Successor: Neville Chamberlain

Orders
- Ordination: 1958
- Consecration: 1990

Personal details
- Born: 7 May 1932 Glasgow, Scotland
- Died: 11 November 2025 (aged 93)
- Denomination: Anglican
- Education: University of Glasgow

Robert Taylor Halliday (7 May 1932 – 11 November 2025) was a Scottish eminent Anglican priest.

== Biography ==
Halliday was educated at the High School of Glasgow and the University of Glasgow (he gained a Master of Arts {MA} and a Bachelor of Divinity {BD}) and ordained in 1958. He held curacies at St Andrews and St Margaret's, Newlands before a 20-year stint as rector of the Church of the Holy Cross, Davidson's Mains. He then returned to St Andrews as a lecturer in Biblical studies at its university and rector of the parish church- posts he held until his elevation to the episcopate as Bishop of Brechin in 1990. He resigned his see in 1997, as he reached the clerical retirement age.

Halliday died on 11 November 2025, at the age of 93.

Religious titles
Preceded by Ted Luscombe	Bishop of Brechin; 1990–1997	Succeeded by Neville Chamberlain
