= Neville Chamberlain (disambiguation) =

Neville Chamberlain (1869–1940) was Prime Minister of the United Kingdom.

Neville Chamberlain may also refer to:

- Sir Neville Bowles Chamberlain (1820–1902), British soldier
- Sir Neville Chamberlain (police officer) (1856–1944), British soldier, inventor of snooker
- Neville Chamberlain (bishop) (1939–2018), bishop of the Anglican Diocese of Brechin, 1997–2005
- Neville Chamberlain (footballer) (born 1960), English football player
