= Matthew Gibson =

Matthew Gibson may refer to:

- Matthew Gibson (bishop) (1734–1790), English Roman Catholic bishop
- Matthew Gibson (priest), Dean of Brechin, 1964–1971
- Matthew Gibson (cyclist) (born 1996), British racing cyclist
- Matt Gibson (born 1953), Scottish snooker player
