= John Mowat (Dean of Brechin) =

John Dixon Mowat was Dean of Brechin from 1947 until 1953.

He was educated at Durham University and ordained in 1908. He was Rector of St Salvador Dundee from 1918 to 1929; and St Mary Arbroath from 1929.

== Notes ==
Scottish Episcopal Church titles
Preceded by John Eric Macrae	Dean of Brechin; 1957–1964	Succeeded by Rudolph Henderson Howat
