= Eric Graham =

Bishop of Brechin; Scottish Episcopalian bishop

The Right Reverend Eric Graham
- Bishop of Brechin
- Church: Scottish Episcopal Church
- Diocese: Brechin
- In office: 1944-1959
- Predecessor: Kenneth Mackenzie
- Successor: John Sprott

Orders
- Ordination: 1913
- Consecration: 1944

Personal details
- Born: 14 December 1888
- Died: 18 January 1964 (aged 75)
- Denomination: Anglican

Eric Graham (14 December 1888 – 18 January 1964) was an Anglican bishop in the mid 20th century.

Graham was born into an ecclesiastical family, a branch of the Dukes of Montrose settled in Ireland in the 18th century; his father was Malcolm Graham, sometime Archdeacon of Stoke-upon-Trent. Graham was educated at Cheltenham College and Oriel College, Oxford, and ordained after a period of study at Wells Theological College in 1913. He was Vice-Principal of Salisbury Theological College, then Fellow and Dean of Oriel College, Oxford. Next he was Rector of Boyton-cum-Sherrington and after that Principal of Cuddesdon Theological College. In 1944 he became Bishop of Brechin, a post he held until 1959.

== Personal ==
In 1919, Graham married Phyllis Norton Buckle, daughter of Christopher Reginald Buckle, a major-general in the British army. They had six recorded children, four sons and two daughters; who include the noted crossword compiler John Galbraith Graham.

Church of England titles
Preceded by Kenneth Mackenzie	Bishop of Brechin; 1944–1959	Succeeded by John Sprott
