= John Balfour (bishop) =

Scottish bishop

- Bishop of Brechin
- Church: Roman Catholic
- See: Diocese of Brechin
- In office: 1465–1488
- Predecessor: Patrick Graham
- Successor: William Meldrum
- Previous posts: Vicar of Linlithgow; Rector of Conveth

Orders
- Consecration: 8 December 1488

Personal details
- Born: unknown
- Died: 1488 unknown

John Balfour (died 1488) was a 15th-century Scottish prelate. He was vicar of Linlithgow and rector of Conveth, before being provided as bishop of Brechin on 29 November 1465. He was consecrated on 8 December by Mark, bishop of Vicenza, with the assistance of Athanasius, bishop of Gerace, and Patrick (Balfour's predecessor), bishop of St Andrews.

He was allowed to retain the church of Conveth (now called Lawrencekirk) after becoming bishop, the papal documents stating that he had held this rectorship for more than nine years prior to 1465. On 9 December his proctor offered 500 gold florins to the papacy.

As bishop, Balfour sat frequently in parliament, his first recorded appearance being 14 October 1467.

After twenty-three years in office there was preparation to secure the appointment of William Meldrum, vicar of Brechin, to the see. On 4 June 1488 a payment of 200 lb. of Flemish groats was made by Walter Monypenny, prior of Loch Leven, to a Florentine merchant for securing bulls in Meldrum's favour; Meldrum was to succeed to the bishopric on the expected vacancy following "the resignation or death of the reverend father in Christ, John Balfour, now bishop of Brechin".

Meldrum was appointed on 4 July. It is unclear if Balfour resigned or died in office. He was definitely dead by 28 July.

Catholic Church titles
| Preceded by Patrick Graham | Bishop of Brechin; 1465–1488 | Succeeded by William Meldrum |
