= Andrew de Buchan =

Bishop of Caithness from 1296 to around 1304

Andrew de Buchan (d. 1304?) was a Scottish Cistercian, bishop of Caithness from 1296.

He was Abbot of Coupar Angus by 1284. He paid homage to Edward I of England at Perth 24 July 1291, and at Berwick-on-Tweed 28 August 1296. He was nominated to the bishopric of Caithness by Pope Boniface VIII, 17 December 1296.

Andrew de Buchan died in or before 1304.

== Notes ==
Attribution

This article incorporates text from a publication now in the public domain: Stephen, Leslie, ed. (1886). "Buchan, Andrew of". Dictionary of National Biography. Vol. 7. London: Smith, Elder & Co.
