= Kenneth Sutherland-Graeme =

Kenneth Malcolm Sutherland-Graeme was an eminent Anglican priest.

He was the incumbent at St Margaret, Aberdeen and then Holy Trinity, Stirling before becoming Provost of St Paul's Cathedral, Dundee in 1931, a post he held for nine years.

Religious titles
Preceded by Alan Campbell Don	Provost of St Paul's Cathedral, Dundee; 1931–1940	Succeeded by John Chappell Sprott
