= Robert Laurie (bishop) =

Minister of the Church of Scotland

Robert Laurie or Lawrie MA (c.1606–1678) was a seventeenth-century Church of Scotland prelate. He was minister of Stirling before becoming, after the Restoration and the reinstitution of episcopal order in Scotland, Dean of Edinburgh.

== Life ==
He was the son of Rev Joseph Laurie, minister of Perth. He graduated with an MA from St Andrews University in 1636 and was licensed to preach by the Presbytery of Perth in 1641. In 1644, he was ordained at Trinity College Church in Edinburgh and in 1648 translated to the nearby Tron Kirk and to the High Kirk of St Giles in 1662.

In 1671, he became Bishop of Brechin, being consecrated at Holyrood House in Edinburgh on 14 July 1672. This was largely a nominal title, which was allowed to return to minister at Holy Trinity in 1674.

He served as Bishop of Brechin until his death in March 1678. The historian Robert Keith referred to him as "a celebrated preacher, and a man of moderation".

== Family ==
He married Catherine Drummond daughter of John Drummond of Colquhalzie. Their youngest daughter Joan Lawrie married Colin Mackenzie, granddaughter of George Mackenzie the Earl of Seaforth.

== Sources ==
- Keith, Robert (1824), An Historical Catalogue of the Scottish Bishops: Down to the Year 1688 (New ed.), London: Printed for Bell & Bradfute

Church of Scotland titles
Preceded by David Strachan	Bishop of Brechin; 1671–1677	Succeeded by George Haliburton
