= Francis Bridger =

Scottish priest

Francis William Bridger (born 1951) is the current dean of Brechin in the Scottish Episcopal Church.

He was educated at Pembroke College, Oxford and ordained in 1979. After a curacy in Islington he was a lecturer at St John's College, Nottingham from 1982 until 1990; vicar of Woodthorpe from 1990 until 1999; principal of Trinity College, Bristol from 1999 until 2005; professor at the Fuller Theological Seminary in the United States from 2005; and rector of Broughty Ferry from 2012.

Religious titles
Preceded by David Christopher Mumford	Dean of Brechin; 2013–present	Incumbent
