= Neville Chamberlain (bishop) =

British bishop

The Right Reverend Neville Chamberlain
- Bishop of Brechin
- Church: Scottish Episcopal Church
- Diocese: Brechin
- Elected: 1997
- In office: 1997–2005
- Predecessor: Robert Halliday
- Successor: John Mantle

Orders
- Ordination: 1964
- Consecration: 1997

Personal details
- Born: 24 October 1939
- Died: 8 October 2018 (aged 78)
- Denomination: Anglican
- Education: University of Nottingham

Neville Chamberlain (24 October 1939 – 8 October 2018) was a British Anglican bishop. He served as Bishop of Brechin in the Scottish Episcopal Church from 1997 to 2005.

== Biography ==
Chamberlain was born on 24 October 1939 and educated at Salford Grammar School and the University of Nottingham, graduating BA in theology and MA in Applied Social Studies, and finally at Ripon Hall, Oxford, gaining a DPSA in 1962 He was ordained in 1964.

Chamberlain was Assistant Curate at St Paul's, Balsall Heath, and then Priest in charge at St Michael's, Hall Green, both in Birmingham. He was a Probation Officer in Grimsby from 1972 to 1974, when he became the Executive Secretary of the Lincoln Diocesan Social Responsibility Committee. In 1982, he was appointed as Rector of St John the Evangelist, Edinburgh, a benefice he held for fifteen years. He was then Bishop of Brechin from 1997 to 2005, and finally Master of Sexey's Hospital, Bruton, from 2005 until 2015.

In 1964, Chamberlain married Diana Hammill, and they had three sons and one daughter; he died on 8 October 2018.

Religious titles
Preceded by Robert Taylor Halliday	Bishop of Brechin; 1997–2005	Succeeded by John Mantle
