= Walter Whitford =

Scottish minister and Bishop of Brechin

- Bishop of Brechin
- Church: Church of Scotland
- See: Brechin
- In office: 1635–1638
- Predecessor: Thomas Sydserf
- Successor: Vacant (until 1662)

Orders
- Consecration: 7 December 1635

Personal details
- Born: c. 1581 Probably Lanarkshire, Scotland
- Died: 1647 (aged 65–66) England

Walter Whitford (c. 1581 – 1647) was a seventeenth-century Scottish minister, prelate and Royalist. After graduating from the University of Glasgow in 1604, he began a career in the Church of Scotland taking a variety of posts until being appointed Bishop of Brechin in 1635.

As a bishop, Whitford was already mistrusted by hardline Presbyterians, and he made himself more unpopular by backing the attempt by the monarchy to impose Archbishop William Laud's prayer book on his congregation. After the abolition of episcopacy by the Church of Scotland in 1639, Whitford was deprived of his bishopric and fled to England. There he retained his sympathy for the monarchy, gaining a small position there before dying in 1647.

== Early life and career ==
Born about 1581, he was the son of Adam Whitford of Milntown (later called Milton Lockhart) near Carluke, by his wife Mary, daughter of Sir James Somerville of Cambusnethan in Lanarkshire. The family of Whitford derives its name from the estate of Whitford in Renfrewshire on the river Cart. Adam Whitford was accused of being concerned in January 1575–6 in a conspiracy against the regent, James Douglas, 4th Earl of Morton.

Walter was educated at the University of Glasgow, graduating in 1601, and afterwards acted as regent. On 10 May 1604 he was licensed to preach by the presbytery of Paisley, and on 3 December 1608 he was presented by King James VI to the parish of Kilmarnock in Ayrshire. In 1610 he was translated to Moffat in Dumfriesshire, where he was admitted before 8 June. In 1613 he was nominated on the commission of the peace for Annandale, and was involved in several of the family feuds with which the county abounded.

On 27 June 1617 Whitford signed the protestation to parliament in support of the liberties of the kirk, but he suffered himself soon after to be won over by the king, and on 15 June 1619 he was nominated a member of the court of high commission. On 30 August he was constituted minister of Failford in Ayrshire by James VI, in addition to his other charge. In March 1620 he received the degree of Doctor of Divinity from Glasgow University; and on 4 August 1621 he was confirmed in his ministry by act of parliament. In 1623 his commission as justice of the peace was renewed, and he was appointed convener of the stewartry of Annandale.

In the same year James proposed to translate him to Liberton in Midlothian, but failed to carry out his intention. On 25 October 1627 he was appointed one of the commissioners nominated by the king for taking measures against Catholics, which on 21 October 1634 was expanded into a high commission to cite and punish all persons dwelling in Scotland concerning whom there were unfavourable reports. On 9 December 1628 he was presented by Charles I to the sub-deanery of Glasgow, which after 1670 formed the parish of Old Monkland in Lanarkshire. In 1630 a dispute regarding the crown's right of patronage prevented him taking possession before there. On 21 October 1634 he was nominated to the commission for the maintenance of church discipline.

== Bishop of Brechin ==
In 1635 Whitford was consecrated as Bishop of Brechin as successor to Thomas Sydserf, holding the sub-deanery in commendam until 1639, when he disponed his title to James Hamilton, third Marquis (afterwards first Duke) of Hamilton. On 16 April 1635 he was created a burgess of Arbroath. Whitford used his episcopal authority to support the liturgical changes which Charles I had introduced. The new Scottish Prayer Book was very unpopular with the masses in Scotland, and in 1637, when Whitford announced his intention of reading it, he was threatened with violence. Undeterred he ascended the pulpit, holding a brace of pistols, his family and servants attending him armed, and read the service with closed doors. On his return he was attacked by an enraged mob, and escaped with difficulty.

The minister of Brechin, Alexander Bisset, refused to obey Whitford's commands to follow his example. The bishop caused his own servant to read the service regularly from the desk. This obstinacy roused intense feeling against him, and towards the close of the year, after his palace had been plundered, he was compelled to flee to England, where, with two other bishops, he violently opposed the Scottish treasurer, Sir John Stewart, 1st Earl of Traquair, whose moderation he disliked, drawing up a memorial against employing him as a commissioner to treat with the Scots.

== Exile in England ==
On 13 December 1638 he was deposed and excommunicated by the Glasgow assembly, whose authority, in common with the other bishops, he had refused to recognise. In addition to the ecclesiastical offence of signing the declinature, he was accused of drunkenness and incontinence, and of "using of masse crucifixes in his chamber". On 23 August 1639 he and the other Scottish prelates drew up a protest against their exclusion from parliament.

On 28 December 1640 Whitford was living in London in great poverty, but on 5 May 1642, as a recompense for his sufferings, Charles presented him to the rectory of Walgrave in Northamptonshire, where he was instituted. He suffered at the hands of the Long Parliament, and there were attempts to remove him from his position. In 1646 he was expelled by the parliamentary soldiery; he died the following year, and was buried on 16 June in the middle aisle of the chancel of St Margaret's, Westminster.

== Family ==
He married Anne, fourth daughter of Sir John Carmichael of that ilk, and niece of the regent Morton. By her he had five sons, John, Adam, David, Walter, and James. He also had two daughters, Rachel and Christian. Rachel was married to James Johnstone, laird of Corehead, and Christian to William Bennett of Bains; Rachel is credited with the discovery of the Moffat Well, which led to Moffat developing into a modest spa town. James received a commission as ensign in the Earl of Chesterfield's regiment of foot on 13 June 1667. In 1660 Whitford's widow petitioned for a yearly allowance out of the rents of the bishopric of Brechin in consideration of the sufferings of her family in the royal cause.

His eldest son, John Whitford (died 1667), divine, was presented, at the instance of Laud, to the rectory of Ashton in Northamptonshire, and instituted in 1640. He was ejected in 1645, and took refuge with his father. He was reinstated at the Restoration, and on 5 July 1661 received a grant of £100 in compensation for the loss of his books and other property. He died at Ashton on 9 October 1667. He married Judith (died 5 March 1707), daughter of John Marriott of Ashton.

The third son, Adam Whitford (1624–1647), soldier, born in 1624, was a king's scholar at Westminster School, and in 1641 was elected to Christ Church, Oxford, whence he matriculated on 10 December, graduating B.A. on 4 December 1646. Like his brother David, he enrolled himself in the royal garrison at Oxford, and was killed in the siege. He was buried in the south transept of Christ Church Cathedral on 10 February 1647.

== Sources from Dictionary of National Biography article ==
Scott's Fasti Eccles. Scoticanæ, I. ii. 655, II. i. 172, III. ii. 889; Wood's Athenæ Oxon. ed. Bliss, iii. 1016; Keith's Catalogue of Scottish Bishops, 1824, p. 167; Registrum Magni Sigilli Regum Scotorum, 1620–33 pp. 243, 513, 1634–1651 pp. 40, 156, 214, 710; Bridges's Hist. of Northamptonshire, ed. Whalley, i. 284–5, 301, ii. 129–30; Baillie's Letters and Journals (Bannatyne Club), vol. i. passim; Nisbet's Heraldry, 1722, i. 376–7; Spottiswoode's Hist. of the Church of Scotland (Spottiswoode Soc.), i. 44; Calderwood's Hist. of the Kirk (Wodrow Soc.), vol. vii. passim; Black's Hist. of Brechin, 1839, pp. 51–2, 303–4; Row's Hist. of the Kirk of Scotland (Wodrow Soc.), pp. 269, 342, 388; Balfour's Annales of Scotland, 1825, i. 364, ii. 309; George Crawfurd's Description of the Shire of Renfrew, ed. Robertson, 1818, pp. 56–7; Memoirs of Henry Guthry, 1748, p. 16; Irving's Upper Ward of Lanarkshire, 1864, ii. 420; Hewins's Whitefoord Papers, 1898; Kennet's Reg. and Chron. 1728, p. 204; Hamilton's Description of the Sheriffdoms of Lanark and Renfrew (Maitland Club), pp. 18, 79; Pitcairn's Criminal Trials, 1833, I. ii. 70; Munimenta Alme Glasguensis (Maitland Club), passim; Grub's Ecclesiastical Hist. of Scotland, 1861, ii. 353, iii. 32, 42, 44, 88; Acts of Parliament of Scotland, iv. 688, v. 46, 120, 129, 479, 505, 528, vii. 347; Spalding's Memorials of Trubles (Spalding Club), passim; Peterkin's Records of the Kirk, 1843, pp. 26–7, 99–106; Paterson's Hist. of Ayr and Wigton, 1866, ii. 466; Wood's Hist. and Antiq. of the Colleges of Oxford, ed. Gutch, p. 510; Misc. Gen. et Herald. 2nd ser. i. 289; Laud's Works (Library of Anglo-Catholic Theol.), iii. 313, vi. 434–5, 438, 590, vii. 427.

Religious titles
Preceded by Thomas Sydserf	Bishop of Brechin; 1635–1638	Vacant Title next held by David Strachan
