= William Meldrum (bishop) =

Roman Catholic bishop

- Bishop of Brechin
- Church: Roman Catholic
- See: Diocese of Brechin
- In office: 1488–1514x1516
- Predecessor: John Balfour
- Successor: John Hepburn
- Previous post(s): Vicar of Brechin

Orders
- Consecration: 30 January x 7 July 1489

Personal details
- Born: c. mid-15th century Perhaps Seggie, Fife
- Died: 8 December 1514 x 19 March 1516 unknown

William Meldrum (died 1514 × 1516) was a prelate in the late 15th- and early 16th-century kingdom of Scotland. He appears to have come from the Meldrum family of Seggie, as suggested by the otters on his arms.

He was vicar of Brechin parish and a canon of the cathedral when provided bishop of Brechin 4 July 1488. His appointment had been foreseen before the death of his predecessor John Balfour; by 4 June 1488 Meldrum had been selected to succeed to the bishopric upon the expected "resignation or death of the reverend father in Christ, John Balfour, now bishop of Brechin".

He was consecrated sometime between 30 January (described as "elect") and 7 July (described as "bishop") 1489. Bishop Meldrum is recorded for the last time in possession of the see on 8 December 1514, and is dead by 19 March 1516, dying at some stage between. He was succeeded by John Hepburn.

== Notes ==
Catholic Church titles
Preceded by John Balfour	Bishop of Brechin; 1488–1514x1516	Succeeded by John Hepburn
