= Abbot of Coupar Angus =

The Abbot of Coupar Angus (later Commendator of Coupar) was the head of the monastic community and lands of Coupar Angus Abbey, on the boundary between Angus and Gowrie in Scotland. The abbot David Bane (David Bayn) was granted the mitre in 1464. The following are a list of abbots and commendators.

== List of abbots ==
- Fulk, x1164-1170
- Ralph, 1171–1189
- Adam, 1189–1194
- Arnold, 1194-x1201
- William (I), 1201-1202
- Udard, 1202–1207
- Richard, 1207–1209
- Alexander, 1209–1240
- Gilbert, 1240–1243
- William de Binin, 1243–1258
- William (III), 1258–1283
- Andreas de Buchan, 1284-1296
- Alan, x1300-1315x
- John Orwell, x1325-1341x1356
- Lambert, fl. 1356
- Walter, fl. 1387
- John de Ketnes, x1395-1419
- William de Ledhuys (Ledhouse), 1419-x1428
- Thomas de Furde, x1428-1429
- William de Blare, 1429-1453x1456
- Thomas de Levingstone, 1456–1459
- John de Hudton, 1460–1461
- David Bane, 1461-1479x1483
- John Schanwell, 1479x1483-1506
- Robert Beaton, 1507
- William Turnbull, 1507–1524
  - William Stewart, 1511–1512
  - Thomas Hay, 1524–1525
  - John (Alexander) Spens, 1524-1526 (elect only)
- Donald Campbell 1526-1562/3

== List of commendators ==
- Leonard Leslie (I), 1563–1602
- George Foullertoun the Younger of Dunune, 1594
- Leonard Leslie (II), 1596–1598
- Andrew Lamb, 1603–1607
- Patrick Stirling, 1607
- James Elphinstone, 1606–1607

== Bibliography ==
- Cowan, Ian B. & Easson, David E., Medieval Religious Houses: Scotland With an Appendix on the Houses in the Isle of Man, Second edition, (London, 1976), pp. 73–4
- Easson, D. E., Charters of the Abbey of Coupar Angus, 2 vols., Publications of the Scottish History Society. 3rd series; v. 40–41, (Edinburgh, 1947)
- Watt, D. E. R. & Shead, N. F. (eds.), The Heads of Religious Houses in Scotland from the 12th to the 16th Centuries, The Scottish Records Society, New Series, Volume 24, (Edinburgh, 2001), pp. 43–7
