= John Macrae (priest) =

John Eric Macrae (died 1947) was a British clergyman. He was Dean of Brechin from 1936 until 1947.

He was educated at the University of St Andrews and ordained in 1894. He served curacies at St Andrew, Dundee and St Saviour, Pimlico. After this he was the Chaplain of Edinburgh Theological College. During World War I he was a Chaplain to the Forces. He was Rector of St Clement Salford; All Saints, Worcester; and from 1924 All Saints, Invergowrie.

He died in 1947.

== Notes ==
Scottish Episcopal Church titles
Preceded by Joseph Brewer Jobberns	Dean of Brechin; 1957–1964	Succeeded by John Dixon Mowat
