= Donald Campbell (abbot) =

Scottish noble and churchman

- Born: Early 1500s
- Died: 16 December 1562 x 20 January 1563
- Other name: Dòmhnall Caimbeul
- Occupation: Abbot
- Title: Abbot of Coupar Angus; Bishop of Dunkeld; Bishop of Brechin

Donald Campbell (Scottish Gaelic: Dòmhnall Caimbeul) (died 1562) was a 16th-century Scottish noble and churchman. He was the son of Archibald Campbell, 2nd Earl of Argyll and Elizabeth Stewart, daughter of John Stewart, 1st Earl of Lennox. From 1522, he was a student of St Salvator's College, at the University of St Andrews. After graduation, he became a cleric in his home diocese, the diocese of Argyll.

== Biography ==
=== Abbot of Coupar Angus ===
In May 1525, King James V of Scotland recommended Campbell's appointment as Abbot of Coupar Angus, a recommendation confirmed by parliament in the following year - despite the fact that the monks of Coupar Angus Abbey had already elected one of their brothers, Alexander Spens, to the position in early 1524. In September 1529, the papacy agreed that Campbell could hold the abbey for eight months in commendam, providing that if he did not become a monk in this period the abbey would thereafter be regarded as vacant; the following February, 1530, he received an eight-month extension to this. Campbell seems to have complied, and was in France in the following months.

Donald was back in Scotland in 1532, attending parliament that year. In May 1533, he was given a five-year appointment as commissioner of the Chapter-General of the Scottish Cistercian Order. While delegating the ordinary business of the abbey to monks, kinsmen and friends, and in Scotland held a variety of high-profile political offices in this period, including Senator of the College of Justice (July 1541), Lord of the Articles for the parliaments of March and December 1543 and was a member of the Privy Council (June 1545); he had visited France again in 1536.

=== Bishopric of Dunkeld ===
In 1549 he secured crown nomination to the bishopric of Dunkeld from the Governor of Scotland, James Hamilton, Duke of Châtellerault. The vacancy was caused by the translation of the previous bishop, John Hamilton, to the archbishopric of St Andrews in 1547.

His appointment was opposed by one Robert Crichton. Crichton was the nephew of George Crichton, Bishop of Dunkeld, who had died in 1544, and had been appointed coadjutor and successor to his uncle the year before the latter's death - without the consent of the Scottish government. The government thus ignored the appointment, placing Hamilton in charge. Robert litigated - unsuccessfully - against Hamilton in the Papal see. When Hamilton was translated, Crichton was still litigating. The dispute continued into 1553. When Mary of Guise took over the government from Châtellerault in 1554, she acknowledged Crichton's position and Campbell appears to have given up the bishopric. In this year, perhaps in compensation, he was made Keeper of the Privy Seal, a position he held until his death in 1562.

=== Brechin and the Reformation ===
By 1558, and perhaps as early as 1557, Campbell pursued another bishopric, the bishopric of Brechin, possibly receiving a nomination from Mary of Guise. The vacancy had been caused by the death of Bishop John Hepburn in the early summer of 1557. Campbell's proctor in Rome, John Row, attempted to gain permission for his master to abandon the dress Cistercian monk and to hold the bishopric of Brechin with the abbacy of Coupar Angus. Campbell never seems to have been awarded the see.

Campbell's ambition for Brechin was overtaken by the events of the Scottish Reformation. Although he was present at the burning of the Protestant Walter Milne in April 1558, in the following year Abbot Campbell himself became a Protestant and, at the urging of the Lords of the Congregation, abandoned monastic habit, banned mass from his monastery and destroyed its icons and altars. He entrusted Coupar Angus Abbey at this time to his friend Katherine Campbell, Countess of Crawford. In the following year he attended the Reformation Parliament which severed Scotland's ties with Rome.

He died sometime between 16 December 1562 and 20 January 1563. He is said to have left five illegitimate sons, who were later declared legitimate in order that they might inherit estates of property given to them from the tracts of land formerly belonging to the Catholic Church and redistributed by the state post-Reformation.

== Notes ==
Religious titles
Preceded by William Turnbull see also Alexander Spens; Thomas Hay	Abbot of Coupar Angus; 1525–1562	Succeeded by Leonard Leslie see also John Campbell
Preceded by John Hamilton	Bishop of Dunkeld not consecrated 1549–1554	Succeeded by Robert Crichton
Preceded by John Hepburn	Bishop of Brechin nominated 1557–1559	Succeeded by John Sinclair
