= Andrew Swift (bishop) =

British Anglican bishop and former engineer

The Right Reverend Andrew Swift DL
- Bishop of Brechin
- Church: Scottish Episcopal Church
- Diocese: Diocese of Brechin
- In office: 2018 to present
- Predecessor: Nigel Peyton
- Other post: Dean of the Argyll and The Isles (2012–2018)

Orders
- Ordination: 2007 (deacon); 2008 (priest)
- Consecration: 25 August 2018 by Mark Strange

Personal details
- Born: Andrew Christopher Swift; 10 January 1968 (age 58)
- Denomination: Anglicanism
- Spouse: Susan Mary Swift
- Children: Eleanor Louise Swift Peter James Swift Frances Jane Swift
- Education: University of Edinburgh; University of Aberdeen; Ripon College Cuddesdon; University of Oxford

Andrew Christopher Swift, DL (born 10 January 1968) is a British Anglican bishop and former engineer. Since 2018, he has been the Bishop of Brechin in the Scottish Episcopal Church.

== Education ==
Swift graduated Bachelor of Engineering from the University of Edinburgh in 1990, and Master of Science from the University of Aberdeen in 1997. He undertook formation for the priesthood at Ripon College Cuddesdon, graduating Bachelor of Theology from the University of Oxford in 2008.

== Ordained ministry ==
Swift was ordained in the Church of England as a deacon in 2007 and as a priest in 2008. He served his curacy at St Catharine's Church, Gloucester in the Diocese of Gloucester.

In 2010, Swift moved to the Scottish Episcopal Church, joining the Diocese of Argyll and The Isles. He served as Dean of the Argyll and The Isles from 2012. He had additionally been Priest-in-Charge and then Rector of Holy Trinity Church, Dunoon, and St Paul's Church, Rothesay. In June 2018, it was announced that he had been elected the next Bishop of Brechin. On 25 August 2018, he was consecrated a bishop by Mark Strange, Primus of the Scottish Episcopal Church, and installed as the 51st Bishop of Brechin during a service at St Paul's Cathedral, Dundee.

Scottish Episcopal Church titles
Preceded by Nigel Peyton	Bishop of Brechin; 2018 to present	Incumbent
