= Frederick Leach =

British artist

Frederick Richard Leach (1837–1904) was an English master decorator, mural and stained glass painter based in Cambridge. He worked with the architects George Frederick Bodley and George Gilbert Scott Junior, the designer William Morris and the church craftsman Charles Eamer Kempe on many Victorian Gothic revival churches, Cambridge college interiors and church restorations.

== Biography ==
Leach was born in Cambridge, where his father, Richard Hopkins Leach was an artist and craftsman. It is uncertain how he was educated, although he clearly was highly literate and erudite, with a good knowledge of art and literature. At 17 he resolved to use his talents for God. A sincere member of the Church of England, his personal beliefs tended towards low church Anglicanism. His preferred place of worship was Christ Church, Cambridge, an early Victorian structure, where he made the east window, but he worked on many high church (or Anglo-Catholic) commissions, thinking that this was for the glory of God, employing the maxim 'to work is to pray'.

In 1862 he bought a premises in City Road, Cambridge, which became both his home and the headquarters of his business as an artist-craftsman. As his trade expanded he established a showroom in St Mary's Passage, on the west side of Market Hill in Cambridge.

Leach emerged as a nationally known artist-craftsman in 1866, when he worked with Bodley and Kempe on the decoration of St John the Baptist's church at Tuebrook in Liverpool and with William Morris on the ceiling decorations of the chapel of Jesus College, Cambridge. Subsequent collaborations with Bodley included the roof and organ loft of St Botolph's Church, Cambridge, the interior decoration of St Salvador's Church, Dundee and the decoration of the dining hall in Queens' College, Cambridge. He was responsible for much of the decorations of the walls and ceilings of All Saints, Cambridge, one of Bodley's most significant works. He also carried out Morris's redesign for the roof of the Oxford Union in 1875

Frederick Leach was a close friend of Charles Eamer Kempe, doing much to help Kempe start as a stained glass craftsman, although their relationship seems to have cooled after 1872.

In 1866 Leach was contracted by William Beaumont to paint the organ pipes and front during the restoration of St Michael's, Cambridge, and, after Beaumont's death, by George Gilbert Scott Junior for the reredos over a two-year period from 1872 to 1874 at a fee of £203-16-2. In 1874, Leach painted the roof, without payment, as a thanks offering to God.

Frederick Leach's most significant original commission was probably the interior decoration of St Clement's Church, Cambridge. Here he was responsible for the entire interior decoration, which included some elaborate wall paintings that he personally devised and executed. Much of this has been lost, apart from the rood beam, and an impressively large painting on the east wall of the chancel showing Jesus as the divine head and great high priest of the church, surrounded by biblical figures and saints.

Other Cambridgeshire commissions included the windows of St Peter's, Barton. Leach painted the sundial of Queens' College Cambridge in 1864 and his firm was to repaint it in 1911.

In 1880 he received a prestige commission to work on the interior of St James's Palace in London, although it is uncertain how much of his work might have survived.

Frederick Leach married Mary Ann Goodenough in 1864: they had four sons who grew to adulthood: Barnett (1864–1949), Frederick (1869–1948), Walter (1870–1934) and Charles (1875–1961). While Charles emigrated to Canada, his three older sons went into business with him: thus his company name was changed to 'F. R. Leach and Sons'. In 1893 Frederick moved from City Road to a new 'arts and crafts' style house, 'St George's' in De Freville Avenue in Chesterton, a village on the north side of Cambridge. He died on 18 December 1904 and was buried in the churchyard of St Andrew's Church, Chesterton.

Frederick's three older sons, Barnett, Frederick and Charles continued the family business as artist-craftsmen, but financial difficulties led to the company being placed into liquidation in 1916. After this the brothers pursued separate careers.

== David Parr House ==
David Parr, an employee of F. R. Leach and sons, decorated the interior of his house in an elaborate neo-Gothic style. The house, 186 Gwydir Street, Cambridge, opened to the public in May 2019 and became a Grade II* listed building in 2020. At the same time, the Leach's showroom at 3 St Mary's Passage was listed Grade II.
