= George Hay Forbes =

Scottish Episcopal priest (1821–1875)

George Hay Forbes (1821–1875) was a priest of the Scottish Episcopal Church and the brother of Alexander Penrose Forbes, Bishop of Brechin.

Despite severe physical adversity, Forbes was responsible for church building at Burntisland near Edinburgh, where he founded the Pitsligo Press. Amongst his publications he edited works of St Gregory of Nyssa (1855, 1861). Books written by him included The Goodness of God and Doctrinal Errors of the English Prayer Book. He wrote the article "Altars" for the ninth and tenth editions of the Encyclopaedia Britannica.
