= John Hepburn (bishop) =

Scottish bishop

- Bishop of Brechin
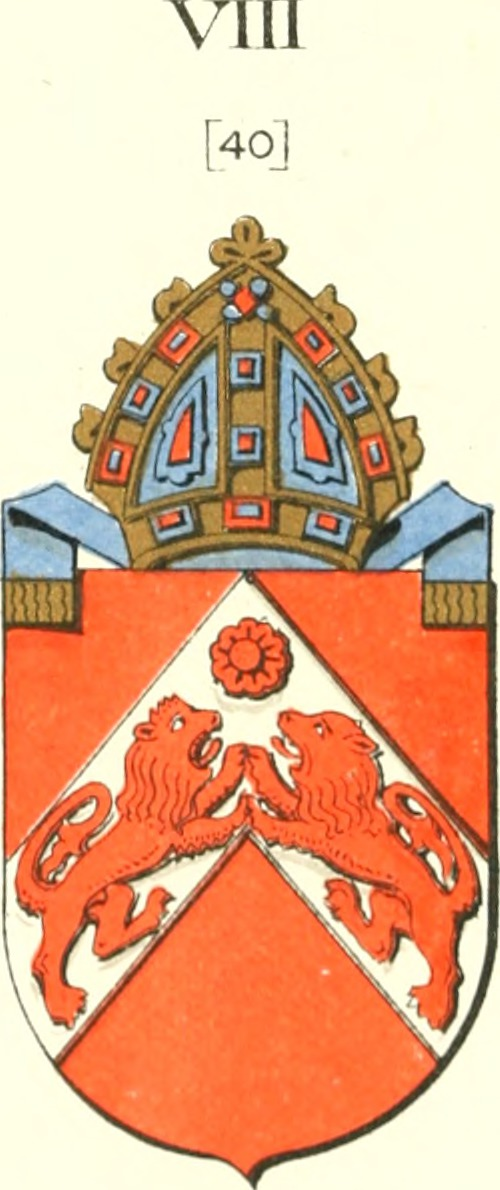
- Coat of arms of John Herburn
- See: Diocese of Brechin
- In office: 1516–1557
- Predecessor: William Meldrum
- Successor: Donald Campbell

Orders
- Consecration: June 1522 x February 1523

Personal details
- Born: circa 1500; East Lothian
- Died: early 1557 unknown

John Hepburn (died between 27 March and 22 May 1557) was provided bishop of Brechin, Scotland, by Pope Leo X on 29 October 1516, but there may have been a delay in consecrating him due to his "defect of age". He may not have been consecrated until sometime between June 1522 and 23 February 1523, though the evidence is complex and contradictory.

He was one of the younger sons of Sir Patrick Hepburn, 1st Earl of Bothwell by his spouse Margaret, daughter of George Gordon, 2nd Earl of Huntly, whose marriage contract was signed on 21 February 1491, indicating a probable year of birth for John as circa 1500.

Bishop Hepburn's first recorded appearance in parliament appears on 16 November 1524, occurring thereafter with great regularity. He died on the eve of the Scottish Reformation having served four decades in office.

Catholic Church titles
Preceded by William Meldrum	Bishop of Brechin; 1516–1557	Succeeded by Donald Campbell
