= David Strachan (bishop) =

Scottish bishop

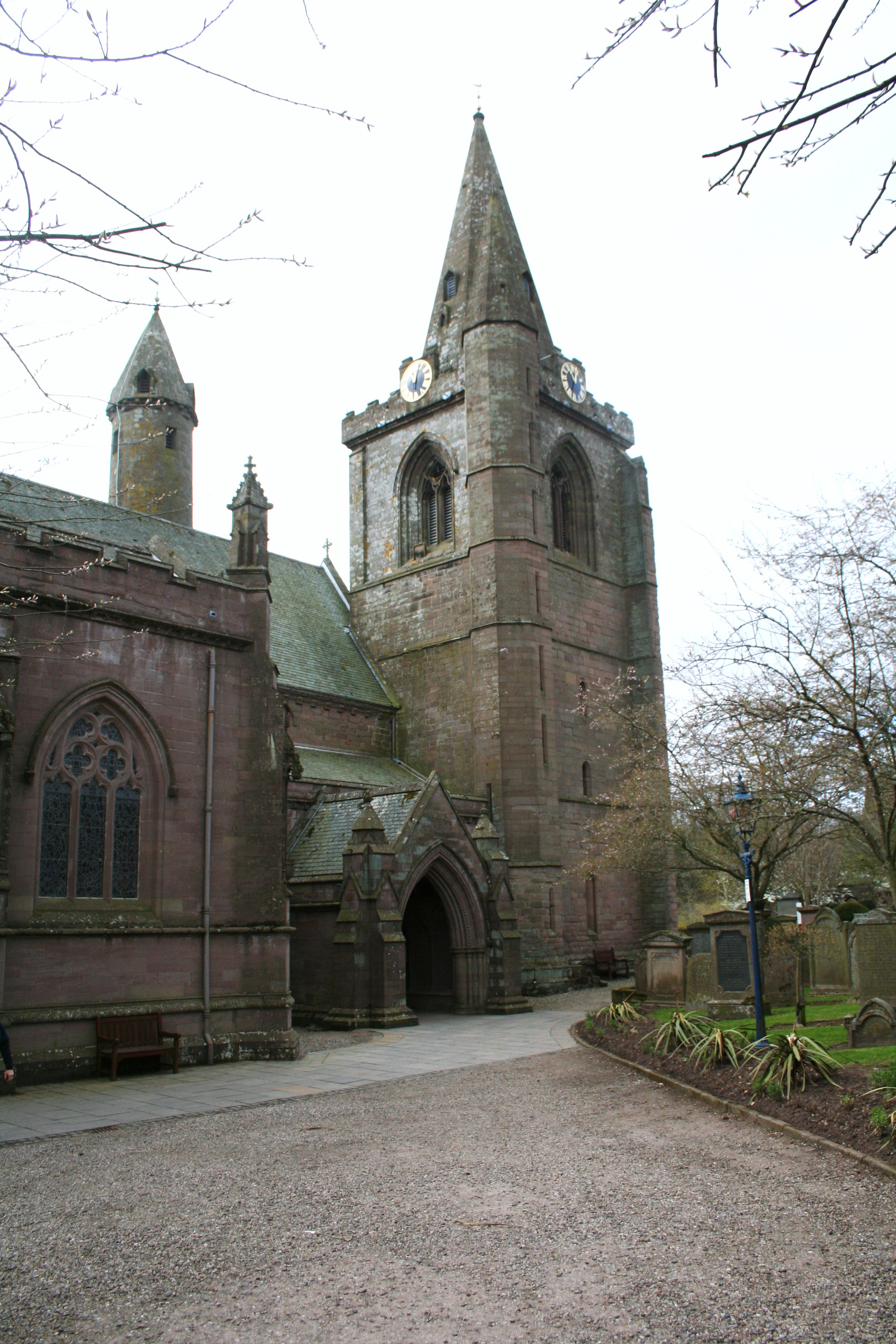
Brechin Cathedral and the clock presented by Strachan

David Strachan (c.1601–1671) was a Scottish clergyman who rose to be Protestant Bishop of Brechin.

== Life ==
He was born around 1601 the son of James Strachan of Monboddo. He was educated at Edinburgh University graduating MA in 1622.

In August 1630 he became minister of Fettercairn. In 1662, after the Restoration, episcopacy was restored in the Church of Scotland and Strachan was appointed Bishop of Brechin under patronage of Charles II. He was consecrated on 7 May 1662 at St Andrews Cathedral and took office on 3 August 1662.

In 1665 he presented a clock to the church for installation on the steeple. He died on 9 October 1671. He is buried in Brechin Cathedral just in front of his pulpit.

== Family ==
He married twice: firstly to Margaret Henderson. Their children included: David Strachan (b.1640) parson of Montrose; James Strachan (1642–1685) apprenticed in Edinburgh, later Commissary of Brechin; John Strachan (b.1647) apprenticed in Edinburgh; Christian; Mary married John Mathie; Beatrix married Rev John Strachan, minister of Strachan; and Margaret.

He secondly married Anne Barclay daughter of David Barclay of Mather, widow of John Douglas of Tilliquhilly.

Church of Scotland titles
Vacant Title last held by Walter Whitford	Bishop of Brechin; 1662–1671	Succeeded by Robert Laurie
