= Glenesk =

- Location within Gauteng Location within South Africa
- Coordinates: 26.232°S 28.046°E
- Country: South Africa
- Province: Gauteng
- Municipality: City of Johannesburg
- Main Place: Johannesburg
- Established: 1931

Area
  - Total: 0.65 km^{2} (0.25 sq mi)

Population (2011)
  - Total: 1,030
  - Density: 1,600/km^{2} (4,100/sq mi)

Racial makeup (2011)
  - Black African: 49.7%
  - Coloured: 12.7%
  - Indian/Asian: 2.9%
  - White: 33.0%
  - Other: 1.7%

First languages (2011)
  - Afrikaans: 34.3%
  - English: 27.5%
  - Zulu: 9.8%
  - Xhosa: 7.0%
  - Other: 21.4%
- Time zone: UTC+2 (SAST)
- Postal code (street): 2190

Glenesk is a suburb of Johannesburg, South Africa, and is located in Region F of the City of Johannesburg Metropolitan Municipality. The suburb lies just north of Turffontein and is south of the CBD.

== History ==
The suburb was surveyed in 1928 and then proclaimed on 30 September 1931. The name has a Scottish origin, named after Glenesk House in Scotland.
