= William of Binning =

13th-century Scottish abbot

William of Binning or William of Binin was a 13th-century Cistercian monk. His name indicates that he came from Binning, in Uphall parish, West Lothian, Scotland; otherwise, his background is obscure. He emerges on 29 November 1243 when he is styled "Prior of Newbattle" (deputy Abbot of Newbattle) and elected to be Abbot of Coupar Angus. According to Alexander Myln's 16th century Vitae Dunkeldensis ecclesiae episcoporum ("Lives of the Bishops of Dunkeld"), when William was at Newbattle Abbey he authored a vita (that is, a biography) of John the Scot (died 1203), successively Bishop of Dunkeld and Bishop of St Andrews. The vita has failed to survive. William resigned his position as Abbot of Coupar Angus on 29 September 1258. He died at an unknown date afterwards.

== Notes ==
Religious titles
Preceded by Gilbert	Abbot of Coupar Angus; 1243–1258	Succeeded by William
