= Arylamine N-acetyltransferase =

arylamine N-acetyltransferase

Identifiers
- EC no.: 2.3.1.5
- CAS no.: 9027-33-2

Databases
- BRENDA: enzyme data
- ExPASy: NiceZyme view
- KEGG: enzyme entry
- MetaCyc: metabolic pathway
- Rhea: reactions
- PDB structures: RCSB PDB PDBe PDBsum
- Gene Ontology: AmiGO / QuickGO
Search
- PMC: articles
- PubMed: articles
- NCBI: proteins

In enzymology, an arylamine N-acetyltransferase (EC 2.3.1.5) is an enzyme that catalyzes the chemical reaction

acetyl-CoA + an arylamine $\rightleftharpoons$ CoA + an N-acetylarylamine

Thus, the two substrates of this enzyme are acetyl-CoA and arylamine, whereas its two products are CoA and N-acetylarylamine.

This enzyme belongs to the family of transferases, specifically those acyltransferases transferring groups other than aminoacyl groups. The systematic name of this enzyme class is acetyl-CoA:arylamine N-acetyltransferase. Other names in common use include arylamine acetylase, beta-naphthylamine N-acetyltransferase, 4-aminobiphenyl N-acetyltransferase, acetyl CoA-arylamine N-acetyltransferase, 2-naphthylamine N-acetyltransferase, arylamine acetyltransferase, indoleamine N-acetyltransferase, N-acetyltransferase, p-aminosalicylate N-acetyltransferase, serotonin acetyltransferase, and serotonin N-acetyltransferase.

== Structural studies ==
As of late 2007, 7 structures have been solved for this class of enzymes, with PDB accession codes PDB: 1GX3, PDB: 1W5R, PDB: 1W6F, PDB: 2BSZ, PDB: 2IJA, PDB: 2PFR, and PDB: 2PQT.
