= Pitsligo Press =

19th-century Scottish printing press

The Pitsligo Press was a printing press founded in 1852 by Scottish Episcopal priest and scholar George Hay Forbes (1821–1875) in Burntisland, Scotland. It published sermons, periodicals, patristic texts, liturgical material, and used fonts in Latin types, as well as Greek, Hebrew, Aramaic, Syriac, Ethiopic and Armenian.

After Forbes's death in 1875, the press moved to Edinburgh under the direction of the Rev. Walter Bell (died 1892), Honorary Canon of Cumbrae.

== Notable publications ==
- The Ancient Liturgies of the Gallican Church (1855)
- John Mason Neale, The Farm of Aptonga (1856)
- Missale Drummondiense: The Ancient Irish Missal, in the Possession of the Baroness Willoughby de Eresby, Drummond Castle, Perthshire (1882)
- Pontificale Ecclesiae S. Andreae: The Pontifical Offices Used by David de Bernham (1885)
- The Works of the Right Reverend Father in God, Thomas Rattray of Craighall, Sometime Bishop of Dunkeld and Primus of the Church of Scotland. Containing, Instructions Concerning the Christian Covenant; A Question Concerning such as Have Communicated without Being Confirmed; An Essay on the Nature of Man; A Letter on the Intermediate State.
