= Brechin Cathedral =

Church in Angus, Scotland

Coordinates: 56.730744°N 2.661497°W

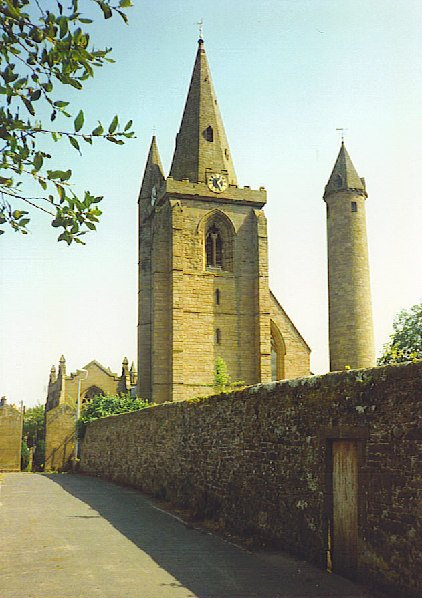
- The Cathedral and Round Tower
- Brechin Cathedral
- Location: Church Lane, Brechin, Angus DD9 6JS
- Country: Scotland
- Denomination: Church of Scotland
- Previous denomination: Roman Catholic
- Churchmanship: Reformed
- Website: brechincathedral.org.uk

History
- Founded: 13th century
- Dedication: Holy Trinity

Architecture
- Functional status: Closed
- Heritage designation: Category A listed building
- Designated: 11 June 1971
- Style: Gothic
- Closed: 2021

Listed Building – Category A
- Official name: Brechin Cathedral Church Lane
- Designated: 11 June 1971
- Reference no.: LB22439

Scheduled monument
- Official name: Brechin Cathedral Round Tower
- Type: Ecclesiastical: tower
- Designated: 12 March 1996
- Reference no.: SM90041

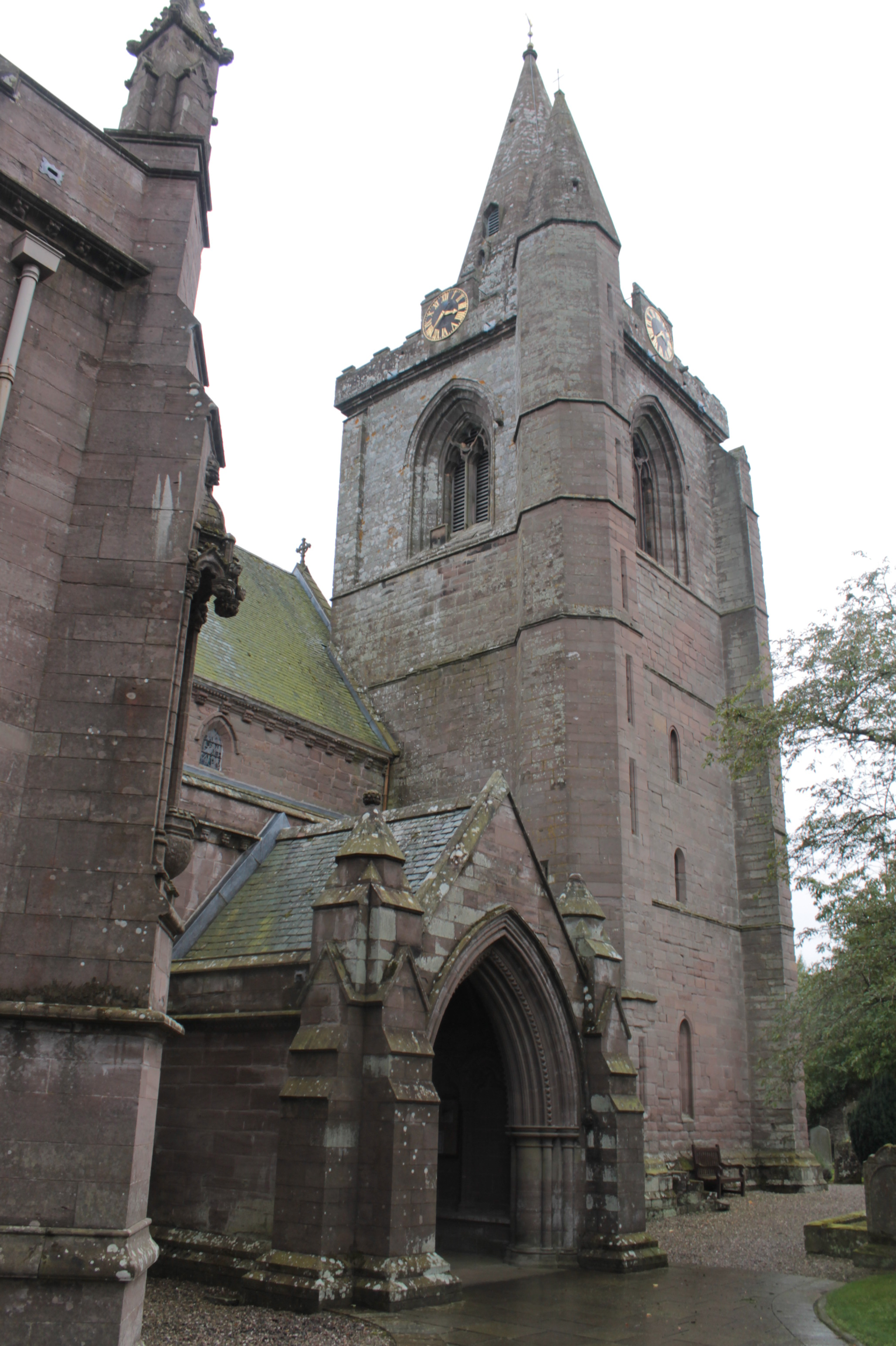
Brechin Cathedral, main entrance

Brechin Cathedral is a Scottish church building which dates from the 13th century. It was the cathedral of the former Roman Catholic Diocese of Brechin but has not served that function since the Scottish Reformation in the 16th century.

It is largely built in the Gothic style, but was altered in 1806, and again in a later restoration by John Honeyman, completed in 1902. The western gable with its flamboyant window, Gothic door and massive square tower, parts of the (much truncated) choir, and the nave pillars and clerestory are all that is left of the original edifice. The modern stained glass in the chancel is reckoned amongst the finest in Scotland.

The cathedral is a Category A listed building and the attached round tower is a scheduled monument.

== Round tower ==
Immediately adjoining the cathedral to the southwest stands the round tower, built about A.D. 1000. It is 86 ft.(26.21 m) high, has at the base a circumference of 50 ft.(15.3 m) and a diameter of 16 ft.(4.9 m), and is capped with a hexagonal spire of 18 ft.(5.5 m), added in the 14th century. This type of structure is somewhat common in Ireland, but the only Scottish examples are those at Brechin and Abernethy in Perthshire.

The quality of the masonry is superior to all but a very few of the Irish examples. The narrow single doorway, raised some feet above ground level in a manner common in these buildings, is also exceptionally fine. The door-surround is enriched with two bands of pellets, and the monolithic arch has a well-preserved representation of the Crucifixion. The slightly splayed sides of the doorway (also monolithic) have relief sculptures of ecclesiastics, one of them holding a crosier, the other a Tau-shaped staff.

Two monuments preserved within the cathedral, the so-called 'Brechin hogback', and a cross-slab, 'St Mary's Stone', are further rare and important examples of Scottish 11th-century stone sculpture. The hogback combines Celtic and Scandinavian motifs, and is the most complex known stone sculpture in the Ringerike style in Scotland. The inscribed St Mary's Stone has a circular border round the central motif of the Virgin and Child which echoes that on the round tower.

== Present ==
Between 1999 and 2009, Scott Rennie was minister of Brechin Cathedral.

In February 2020, the Presbytery of Angus agreed to a dissolution motion, under which ownership of Brechin Cathedral transferred to the General Trustees of the Church of Scotland, who would shut down and sell the building. Nonetheless, the Brechin 2020 committee planned to mark the 800th anniversary of the cathedral on 7 June 2020. In the event this proved impossible due to Covid restrictions.

The Cathedral closed its doors for the final time as a sanctified church at a special service on 28 November 2021.

Led by Caroline Carnegie, Duchess of Fife, a committee of Trustees has been established to take over accountability for the care and development of the Cathedral with a stated intent to restore it to being a focal point and hub for the community and tourists alike.

== See also ==
- Bishop of Brechin
- Brechin
- Diocese of Brechin (Episcopal)
