= Alexander Forbes (bishop of Brechin) =

Scottish Episcopalian divine

The Right Reverend Alexander Forbes
- Bishop of Brechin
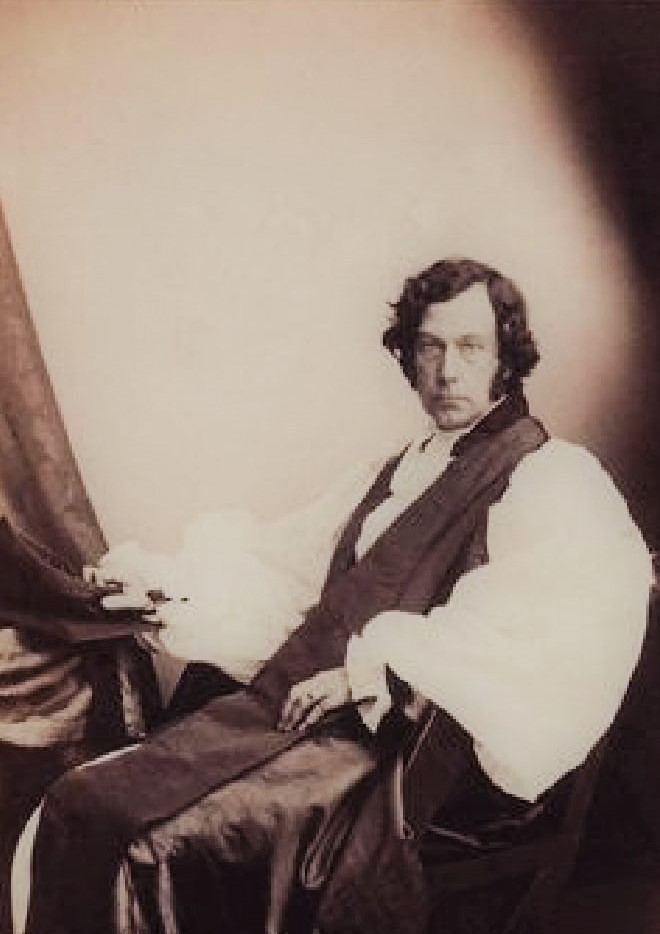
- Church: Scottish Episcopal Church
- Diocese: Brechin
- In office: 1847-1875
- Predecessor: David Moir
- Successor: Hugh Jermyn

Orders
- Ordination: 1845 by Richard Bagot
- Consecration: 28 October 1847 by William Skinner

Personal details
- Born: 16 June 1817 Edinburgh, Scotland
- Died: 8 October 1875 (aged 58) Dundee, Scotland
- Buried: St Paul's Cathedral, Dundee
- Denomination: Anglican
- Education: University of Glasgow; Brasenose College, Oxford

Alexander Penrose Forbes (16 June 1817 – 8 October 1875) was a Scottish Episcopalian divine. A leading cleric in the Scottish Episcopal Church, he was Bishop of Brechin from 1847 until his death in 1875.

== Biography ==
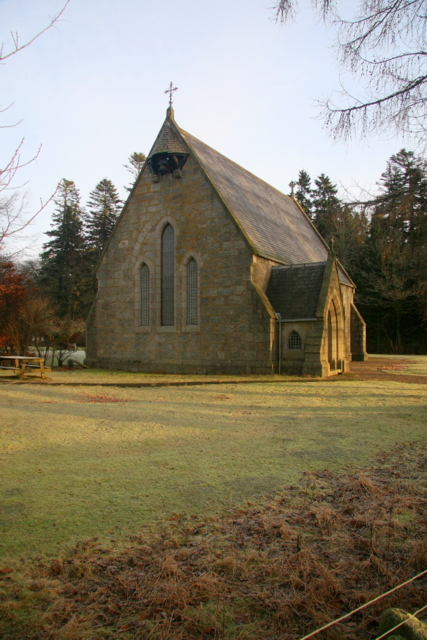
St Drostan's Episcopal Church, Tarfside

Forbes was born in Edinburgh, the second son of John Hay Forbes, Lord Medwyn, a judge of the court of session, and grandson of Sir William Forbes, 6th Baronet of Pitsligo. He studied first at the Edinburgh Academy, then for two years under the Rev. Thomas Dale the poet, in Kent, passed one session at Glasgow University in 1831 and, having chosen the career of the Indian Civil Service, completed his studies with distinction at the East India Company College. In 1836 he went to Madras and secured early promotion, but in consequence of ill health, he was obliged to return to England. In 1840, he entered Brasenose College, Oxford, where in 1841 he obtained the Boden Sanskrit scholarship. He graduated with a B.A. in 1844.

He was at Oxford during the early years of the movement known as Tractarianism, and was powerfully influenced by association with John Henry Newman, Edward Bouverie Pusey, and John Keble. This led him to resign his Indian appointment. In 1844 he was ordained deacon and priest in the Church of England, and held curacies at Aston Rowant and St Thomas's, Oxford; but being naturally attracted to the Episcopal Church of his native land, then recovering from long depression, he removed in 1846 to Stonehaven, the chief town of Kincardineshire. The same year, however, he was appointed to the vicarage of St Saviour Church, Richmond Hill, Leeds, a church founded to preach and illustrate Tractarian principles.

On 28 October 1847 Forbes was consecrated to succeed Bishop Moir in the see of Brechin. He removed the episcopal residence to Dundee, where he resided till his death, combining the pastoral charge of the congregation with the duties of the see. When he came to Dundee the churchmen were accustomed owing to their small numbers to worship in a room over a bank. Through his energy, several churches were built, among them the pro-cathedral of St Paul's.

He was prosecuted in the Church courts for heresy, the accusation being founded on his primary charge, delivered and published in 1857, in which he set forth his views on the Eucharist. Keble wrote in his defence, and was present at his trial at Edinburgh. Forbes made a powerful defence but was censured for erroneous teaching. He died at Dundee on 8 October 1875.

Forbes' younger brother George Hay Forbes was also a member of the Episcopalian clergy, patristics scholar and editor. Bishop Forbes' correspondence is held by Archive Services at the University of Dundee as part of the Brechin Diocesan Library Manuscripts Collection. This collection includes correspondence with E. B. Pusey and William Gladstone.

St Drostan's Episcopal Church in Tarfside, Glen Esk, was built in 1879 in memory of Bishop Forbes.

== Principal works ==
- A Short Explanation of the Nicene Creed (1852)
- An Explanation of the Thirty-nine Articles (2 vols, 1867 and 1868)
- Commentary on the Seven Penitential Psalms (1847)
- Commentary on the Canticles (1853)

Religious titles
Preceded by David Moir	Bishop of Brechin; 1847 – 1875	Succeeded by Hugh Jermyn
