= Bishop of Brechin =

Catholic head of the Diocese of Brechin

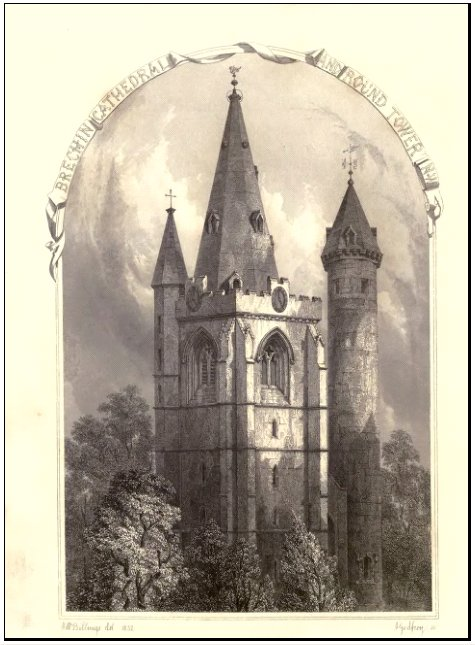
Sketch of Brechin Cathedral and Round Tower, north-west, drawn by W.R. Billings and engraved by J. Godfrey, in the 1800s.

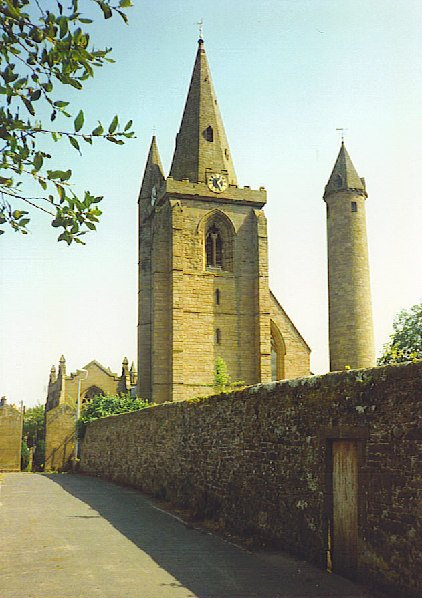
Modern photograph.

The Bishop of Brechin is a title held successively, since c. 1150: (firstly) by bishops of the Catholic church until the Reformation of 1560; (secondly) by bishops of the Church of Scotland until that church declared itself presbyterian in 1689; and (thirdly) by bishops of the Scottish Episcopal Church since then. The seat of the bishops of Brechin until 1689 was Brechin Cathedral which then became the High Kirk of Brechin in the (now presbyterian) Church of Scotland (although still often referred to as Brechin Cathedral). That building ceased to function as a place of worship in November 2021. The current bishop of Brechin leads the Diocese of Brechin in the Scottish Episcopal Church, with its cathedral in Dundee.

== List of known abbots ==
Tenure	Incumbent	Notes
fl. 1131x1150	Léot of Brechin	He was the father of the first bishop. It is very probable that the Gaelic Abbot of Brechin simply became Bishop of Brechin, so that the later bishopric of Brechin was based on the earlier monastic establishment.
fl. late 12th century	Domnall	Domnall nepos Léot, grandson of Abbot Léot, and probably son of Bishop Samson.
fl. early 13th century	Eoin mac in Aba	Grandson of Léot's son Máel Ísu. He was the father of Morgánn, Lord of Glenesk.

== List of bishops ==
=== Pre-Reformation bishops ===
Bishops of Brechin
From	Until	Incumbent	Notes
x 1150	1165 x 1169	Samson of Brechin	Son of Abbot Léot of Brechin
1178	1189 x 1198	Turpin of Brechin	
x 1198-1199	1212	Radulf of Brechin	
1214 x 1215	1218	Hugh of Brechin	Probably from the native clerical family.
1218	1242 x 1246	Gregory of Brechin	
1246	1269	Albin of Brechin	
aft. 1269	bef. 1274	William de Crachin	Had been the dean of Brechin; the Papal legate, Ottobone, refused to consecrate him. One source says he appealed to the Pope and was consecrated, but authorities such as John Dowden doubt this. At any rate, he died on or before the year 1274.
1275	1291 x 1297	William de Kilconcath	Also William Comyn; Dominican friar.
1296	1298	Nicholas of Brechin	
1298	1323 x 1327	John de Kininmund	
1328	1349	Adam de Moravia	
1350	1351	Philip Wilde	
1351	1373 x 1383	Patrick de Leuchars	
1383	1404 x 1405	Stephen de Cellario	
1407	1425 x 1426	Walter Forrester	
1426	1453	John de Crannach	Had previously been Bishop of Caithness.
1454	1462x1463	George Shoreswood	
1463	1465	Patrick Graham	Translated to St Andrews.
1465	1488	John Balfour	
1488	1514 x 1516	William Meldrum	
1516	1557	John Hepburn	
1557	1559	Donald Campbell	He had been the abbot of Coupar Angus, and was the son of Archibald Campbell, 2nd Earl of Argyll. He was unable, despite the help of powerful patrons, to secure the bishopric.

=== Church of Scotland bishops ===
Bishops of Brechin
From	Until	Incumbent	Notes
1565	1566	John Sinclair	
1566	1607	Alexander Campbell	Provided while a minor; resigned 1607.
1607	1619	Andrew Lamb	Translated to Galloway.
1619	1634	David Lindsay	Translated to Edinburgh.
1634	1635	Thomas Sydserf	Translated to Galloway.
1635	1638	Walter Whitford	Deprived on 13 December 1638, along with other Scottish bishops in a general abolition of episcopacy. He died in 1647. Episcopacy was restored in 1661.
1638	1661	Sede vacante	Episcopacy suspended.
1662	1671	David Strachan	Episcopacy restored.
1671	1677	Robert Laurie	
1678	1682	George Haliburton	Translated to Aberdeen.
1682	1684	Robert Douglas	Translated to Dunblane.
1684	1684	Alexander Cairncross	Translated to Glasgow.
1684	1688	James Drummond	
The Episcopacy was abolished in the Church of Scotland in 1689, but continued in the Scottish Episcopal Church.

=== Episcopal bishops ===
Today the bishop is the Ordinary of the Scottish Episcopal Diocese of Brechin.

Bishops of Brechin
From	Until	Incumbent	Notes
1695	1709	The see administered by Alexander Rose, Bishop of Edinburgh.	
1709	1723	The see was part of the territory administered by John Falconer, a college bishop.	
1724	1727	Robert Norrie	Died in office.
1727	1731	Thomas Rattray	Translated to Dunkeld in 1731.
1731	1742	John Ochterlony	Died in office.
1742	1777	James Rait	Died in office.
1778	1781	George Innes	Died in office.
1781	1787	See vacant	
1787	1788	Abernethy Drummond	Translated to Edinburgh and Glasgow in 1788.
1788	1810	John Strachan	Appointed Coadjutor Bishop in 1787 before succeeded Diocesan bishop in 1788.
1810	1840	George Gleig	Appointed Coadjutor Bishop in 1808 before succeeded Diocesan Bishop in 1810; also Primus 1816–1837.
1840	1847	David Moir	Appointed Coadjutor bishop in 1837 before succeeded Diocesan bishop in 1840, died in office.
1847	1875	Alexander Forbes	Died in office.
1875	1903	Hugh Jermyn	Also Primus 1886–1901; died in office.
1904	1934	Walter Robberds	Also Primus 1908–1934.
1935	1943	Kenneth Mackenzie	Previously vicar of St Mary's Church, Selly Oak.
1944	1959	Eric Graham	
1959	1975	John Sprott	Previously Provost of Dundee.
1975	1990	Ted Luscombe	Also Primus 1985–1990; died May 2022.
1990	1997	Robert Halliday	
1997	2005	Neville Chamberlain	Retired; died October 2018.
2005	2010	John Mantle	Retired due to ill health; died November 2010.
2011	2017	Nigel Peyton	Retirement on 31 July 2017 announced in March 2017.
2018		Andrew Swift	Elected 2 June 2018, consecrated 25 August 2018 at St Paul's Cathedral, Dundee.
