= St Paul's Cathedral, Dundee =

Coordinates: 56°27′40″N 2°58′5″W

St Paul's Cathedral
- The Cathedral Church of Saint Paul
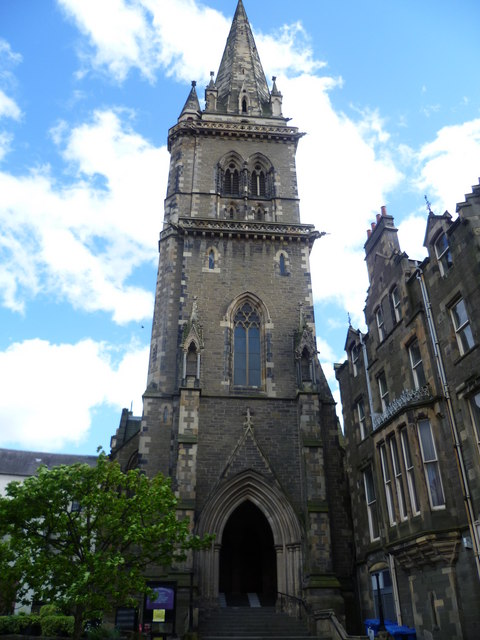
- St Paul's Cathedral
- Location: Dundee
- Country: Scotland
- Denomination: Scottish Episcopal Church
- Churchmanship: Broad Church
- Website: www.saintpaulscathedral.net

History
- Dedication: Saint Paul
- Consecrated: 1 November 1865

Architecture
- Architect: George Gilbert Scott
- Architectural type: Church
- Style: Gothic Revival
- Groundbreaking: 21 July 1853
- Completed: 1855

Administration
- Diocese: Brechin

Clergy
- Bishop: Andrew Swift

St. Paul's Cathedral is an Anglican cathedral in the city of Dundee, Scotland. It is the cathedral and administrative centre of the Diocese of Brechin in the Scottish Episcopal Church.

== Church ==
In 1847, Alexander Penrose Forbes was elected new Bishop of Brechin and chose to make Dundee his permanent residence.

At the time of Bishop Forbes' arrival, St. Paul's Chapel met in rooms in nearby Castle Street, which Forbes considered to be dreary and "unworthy of the worship of the Almighty". Thus, he "urged his people to take on the holy work of building, to the glory of God, a stately church", a place which would offer refuge to the many poor that lived in the surrounding tenements.

The foundation stone of the cathedral was laid on 21 July 1853 and it was completed in 1855. It was designed by George Gilbert Scott and is in the style of the Middle or Decorated period of Gothic architecture.

The total cost of the building exceeded £14,000, and ten years passed before the congregation could pay off all the debts incurred. The church was dedicated on All Saints Day, 1 November 1865.

St. Paul's was raised to cathedral status in 1905 and is now a category A listed building.

The tower contains a set of eight bells hung for change ringing, with the tenor bell weighing 21cwt or 1067kg. The bells were cast in 1871 and 1872 by Mears & Stainbank of Whitechapel, London, and the bells were last rehung in 1999 on a modern steel frame by Hayward Mills of Nottingham. Dundee is one of only three cities in Scotland to have more than one set of change ringing bells, the others being Edinburgh and Aberdeen. The other set of change ringing bells in the city is located at the Parish Church.
