= Diocese of Brechin (Episcopal) =

Anglican diocese of the Scottish Episcopal Church

Coordinates: 56°27′34″N 2°58′20″W

Diocese of Brechin Dioecesis Brechinensis
- Coat of arms

- Flag

Location
- Country: Scotland
- Ecclesiastical province: Scotland

Statistics
- Congregations: 29

Information
- Denomination: Scottish Episcopal Church
- Established: 1153
- Cathedral: St Paul's Cathedral, Dundee

Current leadership
- Bishop: Andrew Swift

Map
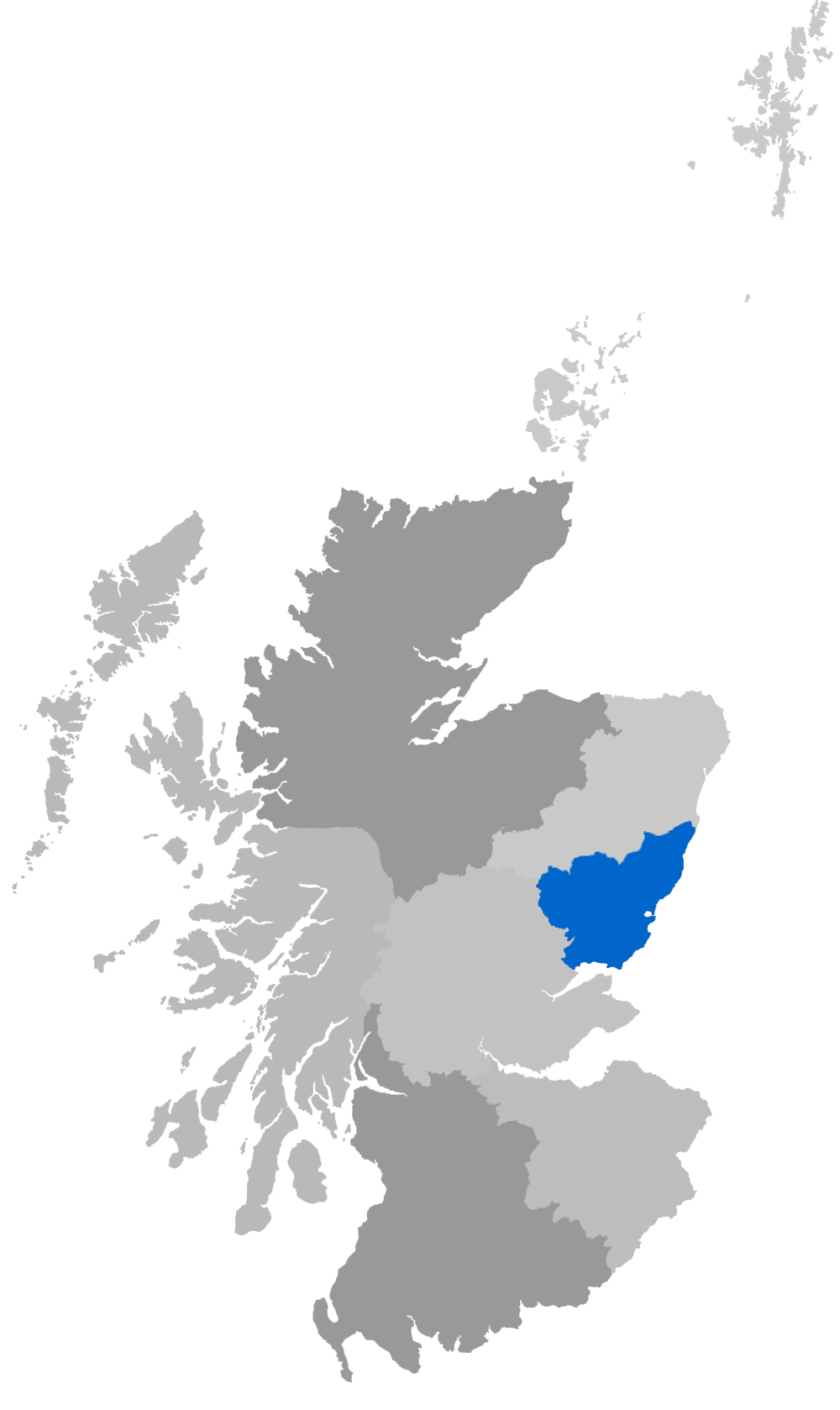
- Map showing Brechin Diocese within Scotland

Website
- thedioceseofbrechin.org

The Diocese of Brechin is in the east of Scotland, and is the smallest of the seven dioceses of the Scottish Episcopal Church. It covers the historic counties of Angus and Kincardineshire. It stretches from Muchalls in the north east down to Dundee in the south, and across to Glencarse in the south west. The cathedral and administrative centre is St Paul’s Cathedral in Dundee. The diocese continues to be named after its medieval centre of Brechin.

The diocese is thought to have been founded in 1153 by Bishop Samson. The diocese had a continuous line of bishops leading through the Reformation, when Donald Campbell (1557) and John Sinclair (1565) were elected Bishops of Brechin, but not consecrated; the line was continued later through Andrew Lamb. In 1566, Alexander Campbell was appointed as titular bishop. The line continued in proper form among Episcopalians with Andrew Lamb in 1610. From 1695 until 1709, the diocese was united with the Diocese of Edinburgh, with the latter's bishop, Alexander Rose, being also Bishop of Brechin. The line of independent bishops of Brechin restarted with John Falconar in 1709, and has continued to the present day. The current bishop is Andrew Swift who was consecrated on 25 August 2018 at St Paul's Cathedral, Dundee.

The Diocese of Brechin is twinned with the Episcopal Diocese of Iowa (Iowa, United States) and with the Anglican Diocese of Swaziland (Swaziland).

The manuscript records of the Diocese of Brechin are held by University of Dundee Archive Services. The archive collections include the administrative records of the diocese, records of individual churches, and the correspondence of Alexander Penrose Forbes and George Frederick Boyle.

== Area and population ==
The diocese covers the historic counties of Kincardineshire (except the Banchory and Lower Deeside areas) (population 31,000), Angus (except the Forfar and Kirriemuir areas) (population 233,500), and the Glencarse area of Perthshire (population 9,000).

This total population of approximately 273,500 gives the diocese a ratio of one priest to every 19,500 inhabitants and one church to every 10,900 inhabitants.

== List of churches ==
The diocese has 12 stipendiary clergy and 25 active churches.

Benefice	Church	Link	Founded (building)	Stipendiary clergy
Muchalls (St Ternan)	St Ternan, Muchalls		c. 1689 (1831)	0
Stonehaven (St James)	St James, Stonehaven		1715 (1877)	0
Catterline (St Philip)	St Philip, Catterline		1843 (1848)	0
Drumlithie (St John the Baptist)	St John the Baptist, Drumlithie		1863	1
Drumtochty (St Palladius)	St Palladius, Drumtochty		1885	1
Fasque (St Andrew)	St Andrew, Fasque		1846	1
Laurencekirk (St Laurence)	St Laurence, Laurencekirk		1871	1
Inverbervie (St David of Scotland)	St David of Scotland, Inverbervie			0
Montrose (St Mary and St Peter)	SS Mary & Peter, Montrose		1724 (1858)	0
Brechin (St Andrew)	St Andrew, Brechin		pre-1870 (1888)	0
Tarfside (St Drostan)	St Drostan, Tarfside		c. 1689 (1879)	0
Arbroath (St Mary)	St Mary the Virgin, Arbroath		1694 (1854)	1
Auchmithie (St Peter)	St Peter, Auchmithie		1885	1
Carnoustie (Holy Rood)	Holy Rood, Carnoustie		1881	1
Monifieth (Holy Trinity)	Holy Trinity, Monifieth		1909	1
Dundee (Cathedral of St Paul)	St Paul's Cathedral, Dundee		pre-1847 (1855)	1
Dundee (St Mary Magdalene)	St Mary Magdalene, Dundee		1854 (1952)	1
Dundee (St Salvador)	St Salvador, Dundee		1859 (1868)	1
Dundee (St Margaret)	St Margaret, Dundee		1861 (1888)	0
Dundee (St Ninian)	St Ninian, Dundee		1938	2
Broughty Ferry (St Mary)	St Mary, Broughty Ferry		1848 (1858)	2
Dundee (St Martin)	St Martin, Dundee		1904 (1972)	2
Dundee (St John the Baptist)	St John the Baptist, Dundee (closed?)		1886	2
Dundee (St Luke)	St Luke, Dundee		1901	1
Invergowrie (All Souls)	All Souls, Invergowrie		1896	0
Glencarse (All Saints)	All Saints, Glencarse (C18th)		C18th (1878)	0

=== Closed churches in the diocese ===
Church	Founded	Closed
Holy Cross, Dundee	1956	1966
St Columba, Dundee	1897	1939
Holy Trinity Mission, Dundee	1873	1944
All Saints Mission, Dundee	1896	1944
St Roque, Dundee	1896	1956

== See also ==
- Brechin Cathedral
