= Robert Norrie =

Anglican bishop

The Right Reverend Robert Norrie MA
- Bishop of Brechin
- Church: Scottish Episcopal Church
- Diocese: Brechin
- In office: 1724-1727
- Successor: Thomas Rattray

Orders
- Consecration: 25 July 1724 by John Fullarton

Personal details
- Born: 1647
- Died: 1727 (aged 79–80)
- Denomination: Anglican

Styles of Robert Norrie, MA
- Reference style: The Right Reverend
- Spoken style: My Lord or Bishop

Robert Norrie, MA (c.1647–1727) was an Anglican clergyman who served in the Scottish Episcopal Church as the Bishop of Brechin from 1724 to 1727.

== Biography ==
He was consecrated the Bishop of the Diocese of Brechin at Edinburgh on 25 July 1724 by Primus Fullarton and bishops Millar, Irvine and Freebairn. He died in office in January 1727.

Scottish Episcopal Church titles
Preceded by John Falconer (administrator)	Bishop of Brechin; 1724–1727	Succeeded by Thomas Rattray (bishop)
