= College bishop =

Category of clergy in the Scottish Episcopal Church

In the early days of the Scottish Episcopal Church, college bishops were men who were consecrated bishops in order to maintain apostolic succession but (extraordinarily) not appointed to any episcopal see. Fourteen such men were consecrated, eight of whom were later appointed to Scottish sees.

== List of college bishops ==
College Bishops of the Scottish Episcopal Church
No.	Name	When consecrated	Where consecrated	Consecrators	Notes	Ref(s)
1	John Fullarton	25 January 1705	Edinburgh	John Paterson, Alexander Rose, & Robert Douglas	Formerly minister of Paisley; appointed Bishop of Edinburgh in 1720; died 1727.	
2	John Sage	25 January 1705	Edinburgh	John Paterson, Alexander Rose, & Robert Douglas	Formerly a minister of Glasgow; died in 1711.	
3	John Falconer	28 April 1709	Dundee	Alexander Rose, Robert Douglas, & John Sage	Also minister of Carnbee; died in 1723.	
4	Henry Christie	28 April 1709	Dundee	Alexander Rose, Robert Douglas, & John Sage	Also minister at Kinross; died 5 May 1718.	
5	Archibald Campbell	25 August 1711	Dundee	Alexander Rose, Robert Douglas, & John Fullarton	Appointed Bishop of Aberdeen in 1721; resigned 1724; died 1744.	
6	James Gadderar	24 February 1712	London	George Hickes, John Falconer, & Archibald Campbell	Formerly minister of Kilmaurs; appointed Bishop of Aberdeen in 1724; died 1733.	
7	Arthur Millar	22 October 1718	Edinburgh	Alexander Rose, John Fullarton, & John Falconer	Appointed Bishop of Edinburgh and Primus in 1727; died later in the same year.	
8	William Irvine	22 October 1718	Edinburgh	Alexander Rose, John Fullarton, & John Falconer	Died 1725.	
9	Andrew Cant	17 October 1722	Edinburgh	John Fullarton, Arthur Millar, & William Irvine	Died 1728.	
10	David Freebairn	17 October 1722	Edinburgh	John Fullarton, Arthur Millar, & William Irvine	Appointed Bishop of Galloway and Primus in 1731, and Bishop of Edinburgh in 1733; died 1739.	
11	John Ochterlony	November 1726	Edinburgh	Andrew Cant, David Freebairn, & Alexander Duncan	Appointed Bishop of Brechin in 1731; died 1742.	
12	James Rose	November 1726	Edinburgh	Andrew Cant, David Freebairn, & Alexander Duncan	Appointed Bishop of Fife in 1731; died 1733.	
13	John Gillan	11 June 1727	Edinburgh	David Freebairn, Alexander Duncan, James Rose, & John Ochterlony	Appointed Bishop of Dunblane in 1731; died 1735.	
14	David Ranken	11 June 1727	Edinburgh	David Freebairn, Alexander Duncan, James Rose, & John Ochterlony	Died 1728.	
