= John Gillan =

Scottish Episcopal clergyman and author

Styles of John Gillan
- Reference style: The Right Reverend
- Spoken style: My Lord or Bishop

John Gillan (c.1667–1735) was a Scottish Episcopal clergyman and author who served as the Bishop of Dunblane from 1731 to 1735.

He was born c. 1667, the son of John Gillan. After his education at Marischal College, Aberdeen, he worked as a bookseller. He married Isabel Wingate, daughter of the Reverend John Wingate, Incumbent of Denny, and Margaret Marschall. He published Vindication of the Fundamental Character of Presbytery (1713), Life of Bishop Sage (1714), and is reputed to be the author of Carnwath's Memoirs.

He was ordained in the Scottish Episcopal Church, and not long afterwards consecrated at Edinburgh a college bishop on 22 June 1727 by bishops Freebairn, Duncan, Rose and Ochterlony. Gillan was the Incumbent of Old Saint Paul's, Edinburgh (1727–35) and elected Bishop of the Diocese of Dunblane in December 1731.

He died in office on 3 January 1735, aged about 68.

== Bibliography ==
- Bertie, David M. (2000). Scottish Episcopal Clergy, 1689–2000. Edinburgh: T & T Clark. ISBN 0567087468.
- Keith, Robert (1824). Russel, Michael (ed.). An Historical Catalogue of the Scottish Bishops: Down To The Year 1688. Edinburgh: Printed for Bell and Bradfute.

Scottish Episcopal Church titles
Vacant Title last held by Robert Douglas	Bishop of Dunblane; 1731–1735	Succeeded by Robert White
