= Henry Christie =

Scottish bishop (born 1655)

Styles of Henry Christie, M.A.
- Reference style: The Right Reverend
- Spoken style: My Lord
- Religious style: Bishop

Henry Christie, M.A. (1655–1718) was a college bishop of the Scottish Episcopal Church in the early eighteenth century.

== Early life and family ==
Born in 1655, he was the youngest son of Henry Christie of Craigton. He was educated at the University of Glasgow, which awarded him a Master of Arts degree on 13 July 1671. He married Margaret Blair, eldest daughter of George Blair of Glasclune. They had four sons: William, James, Alexander and George, and one daughter: Mary.

== Ecclesiastical career ==
His first pastoral appointment was the Minister at Kinross from 31 October 1679 to 1689. On 29 August 1689, he came under a sentence of deprivation from the Privy Council for neither reading the Proclamation of the Estates, nor praying for William III and Mary II, but for the restoration of King James VII and "confusion to his enemies, etc."

Twenty years later, he was consecrated at Dundee on 28 April 1709 as a college bishop in the Scottish Episcopal Church by bishops Rose, Douglas and Sage. He and other college bishops were consecrated to maintain the Episcopal succession without being committed to a particular Episcopal see. After his consecration, he was also Presbyter at Toddrick's Wynd, Edinburgh.

He died on 5 May 1718. There is a memorial brass to him in the burying ground at Kinross.
