= John Falconer (bishop) =

Styles of John Falconer, MA
- Reference style: The Right Reverend
- Spoken style: My Lord or Bishop

John Falconer (or Falconar) (c.1660–1723) was a Scottish clergyman who served as a minister in the Church of Scotland and before becoming a college bishop in the Scottish Episcopal Church.

== Early life and family ==
Born about 1660, he was the son of the Reverend David Falconer and Margaret Braydday. He was educated at the University of Edinburgh, graduating with a Master of Arts degree in 1679. He married Elizabeth Galloway (1671–1691), daughter of Thomas Galloway, 2nd Lord Dunkeld, and they had two sons: James and Thomas.

== Ecclesiastical career ==
He was a chaplain in the family of Wemyss of Wemyss, before becoming the Incumbent of Carnbee from 1683 to 1690. He came under a sentence of deprivation from the Privy Council, 8 September 1689, for not reading the Proclamation of the Estates, etc., and by Act of Parliament, 25 April 1690, restoring Presbyterian ministers.

He was consecrated a college bishop in the Scottish Episcopal Church at Dundee on 28 April 1709 by bishops Rose, Douglas and Sage. He and other college bishops were consecrated to maintain the Episcopal succession without being committed to a particular Episcopal see. He took part in the consecration of James Gadderar in London in 1712. He occupied Glamis parish church in 1716, and was also at Slains parish church with the Reverend William Law. In 1720, he took over the administration of the districts north of the River Forth (with the exception of Aberdeenshire), but did not become a territorial bishop as such.

He died at Inglismaldie on 6 July 1723, aged c. 63, and was buried at Logie Pert, Angus.

== Works ==
He is possibly the author of Cryptomenysis Paterfacta (published in 1685) and wrote a little tract described as "a popular exposition of the various Covenants of God and especially of the sanctions and conditions of the Christian Covenants" which has been preserved in manuscript.
