= James Rose (bishop) =

Scottish Episcopal clergyman

The Right Reverend James Rose
- Bishop of Fife
- Church: Scottish Episcopal Church
- Diocese: Fife
- In office: 1731-1733
- Predecessor: Arthur Rose (As Archbishop of St Andrews)
- Successor: Robert Keith

Orders
- Consecration: 29 November 1726 by David Freebairn

Personal details
- Born: 1655
- Died: 4 April 1733 (age 78)
- Denomination: Anglican

Styles of James Rose, MA
- Reference style: The Right Reverend
- Spoken style: My Lord or Bishop

James Rose, MA (c.1655–1733) was a Scottish Episcopal clergyman who served as the Bishop of Fife from 1731 to 1733.

He was consecrated at Edinburgh as a college bishop on 29 November 1726 by bishops David Freebairn, Andrew Cant and Alexander Duncan. He and other college bishops were consecrated to maintain the Episcopal succession without being committed to a particular Episcopal see. Five years later, he became the bishop of the Diocese of Fife in December 1731.

He died in office on 4 April 1733, aged 78.

Scottish Episcopal Church titles
New title	Bishop of Fife; 1731–1733	Succeeded by Robert Keith
