= John Clement Gordon =

John Clement Gordon (1644–1726), originally just John Gordon, Bishop of Galloway, was born in Scotland on 1644 and was a member of the Gordon family of Coldwells, near Ellon in Buchan, Aberdeenshire.

== Life ==
Gordon became a chaplain in the Royal Navy and then royal chaplain "at New York in America", by which time he was a Doctor of Theology; when, on a vacancy in the see of Galloway, a congé d'élire in his favour was issued on 3 December 1687. He was accordingly elected bishop on 4 February 1688 and consecrated at Glasgow by John Paterson, Archbishop of Glasgow.

After the "Glorious Revolution", he followed James VII/II to Ireland and then to France, and while residing at Saint-Germain he read the liturgy of the Church of England to such English, Scottish and Irish Protestants as resorted to his lodgings. Subsequently, however, he was converted to Roman Catholicism by Jacques-Bénigne Bossuet. It appears that he was privately received into the Roman Church during his sojourn in France, though at a later period he made a public abjuration of Protestantism in Rome, before Cardinal Giuseppe Sacripanti, the cardinal protector of the Scottish nation.

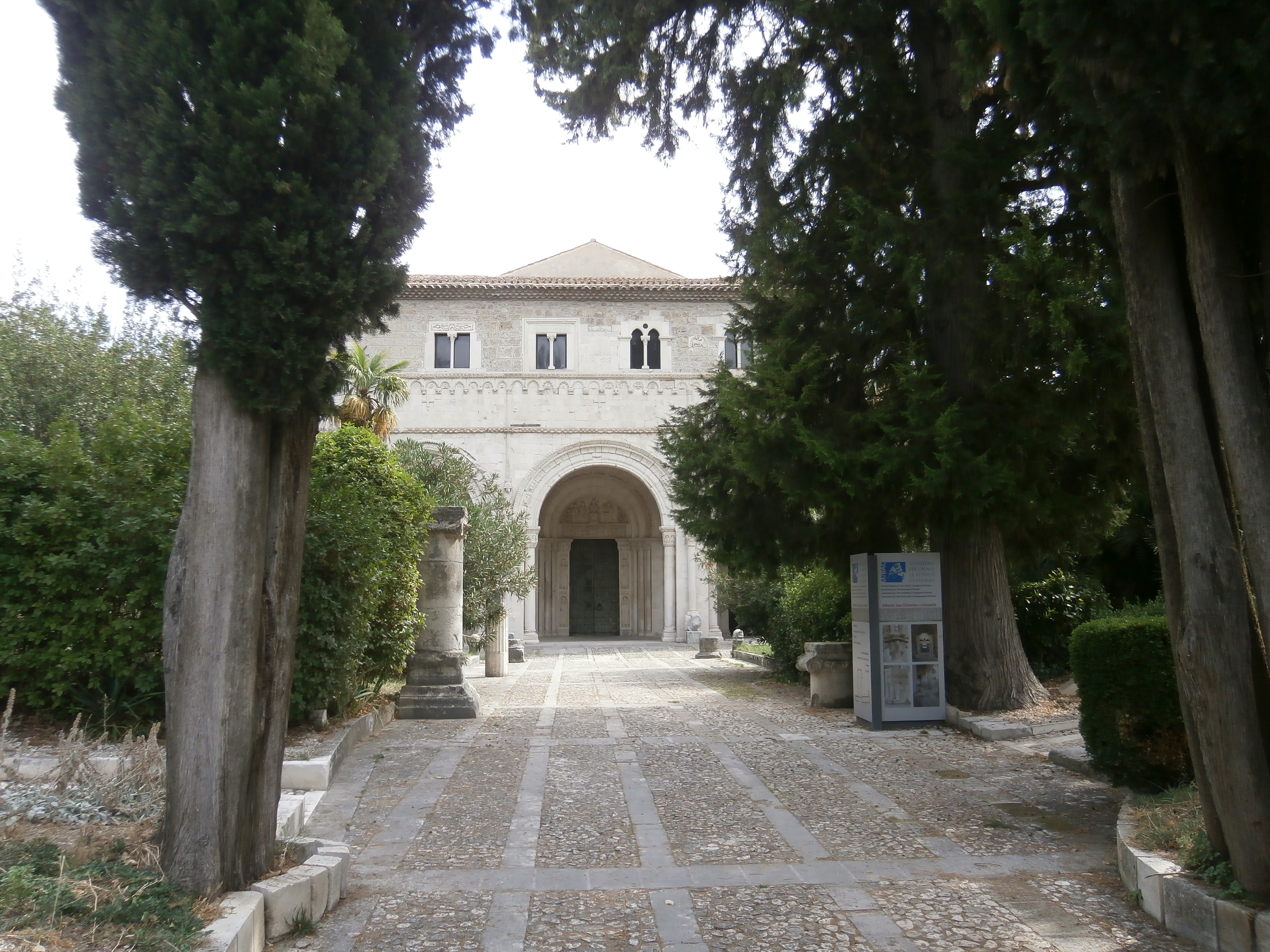
Abbazia di San Clemente a Casauria

At his conditional baptism he took the additional name of the reigning pontiff, and ever afterwards signed himself "John Clement Gordon". The pope, wishing to confer some benefice pension on the new convert, caused the sacred congregation of the inquisition to institute an inquiry into the validity of Gordon's Anglican orders. After a long investigation his orders were treated as if they were null from the beginning. The decree of the inquisition to this effect was issued on 17 April 1704. After this Gordon received the sacrament of confirmation, and Pope Clement XI conferred on him the tonsure, giving him the benefice of the Abbey of San Clemente a Casauria, by reason of which Gordon commonly went by the name of the "Abate Clemente". It is observable that he never received anything other than minor orders in the Roman Catholic Church.

Gordon died in Rome in 1726. He was resident in the Papal States when James VIII/III went there with his court in 1717. He is often thought to be the author of a controversial piece entitled Pax Vobis, or Gospel Liberty, but that attribution is now considered unlikely. He was the last Bishop of Galloway in the official Church of Scotland, episcopacy being abolished in the Scottish Church in 1689, but Bishops of Galloway continued to exist in (then illegal) Episcopal Church of Scotland, that was for Jacobites the real heir of the ancient Church, existed before the Revolution of 1689.

== Sources ==
- Cooper, Thompson, "Gordon, John, D.D. (1644–1726), bishop of Galloway", in Dictionary of National Biography, (Oxford, 1890)
- Cooper, Thompson, "Gordon, John (1644–1726)", rev., Oxford Dictionary of National Biography, Oxford University Press, 2004, Retrieved 30 Sept 2007
- Keith, Robert, An Historical Catalogue of the Scottish Bishops: Down to the Year 1688, (London, 1824)

Attribution

This article incorporates text from a publication now in the public domain: "Gordon, John (1644-1726)". Dictionary of National Biography. London: Smith, Elder & Co. 1885–1900.

Citations and notes

Religious titles
Preceded by James Aitken	Bishop of Galloway; 1687/8-1689	Succeeded by David Freebairn
