= Andrew Lumsden (bishop) =

Scottish clergyman

The Most Reverend Andrew Lumsden
- Bishop of Edinburgh; Primus of the Scottish Episcopal Church
- Church: Scottish Episcopal Church
- Elected: 1727
- In office: 1727-1733
- Predecessor: Arthur Millar
- Successor: David Freebairn
- Other post: Primus of the Scottish Episcopal Church (1727–1731)

Orders
- Consecration: 2 November 1727 by Andrew Cant

Personal details
- Born: 8 October 1654
- Died: 20 June 1733 (aged 78)
- Denomination: Anglican
- Spouse: Katherine Craig
- Children: 8
- Education: University of Edinburgh

Styles of Andrew Lumsden, M.A.
- Reference style: The Most Reverend
- Spoken style: My Lord or Bishop

Andrew Lumsden, M.A. (1654–1733) was a Scottish clergyman who served as the Bishop of Edinburgh (1727–1733) and Primus of the Scottish Episcopal Church (1727–1731).

== Early life and family ==
He was baptised on 8 October 1654, son of the Reverend Charles Lumsden, Incumbent of Duddingston, and Beatrix Melvill. He was educated at the University of Edinburgh, where awarded a Master of Arts degree in 1671. He married Katherine Craig on 26 October 1682, and they had eight children: Elizabeth, Beatrix, John, Charles, William, Margaret, Andrew, and Isabelle. His eldest son, John, was made a baronet in the Jacobite peerage by James Francis Edward Stuart.

== Ecclesiastical career ==
He was licensed to preach in the Church of Scotland by Alexander Young, Bishop of Edinburgh on 4 August 1675. Lumsden's first pastoral appointments were as assistant minister (1675–1686) and Incumbent (1686–1691) of Duddingston. In January 1691, he was deprived of the post by the Commissioners of the General Assembly for declining their authority. Lumsden became a clergyman in the Scottish Episcopal Church and was the Incumbent of the Barrenger's Close meeting-house, Edinburgh, a post which he held until his death.

Following the death of Arthur Millar in October 1727, Lumsden was elected the Bishop of the Diocese of Edinburgh and Primus of the Scottish Episcopal Church. He was consecrated on 2 November 1727 by bishops Rattray, Cant and Keith. The office of Primus was taken from him in December 1731, but retained the see of Edinburgh.

Bishop Lumsden died in office on 20 June 1733, aged 78.

== Bibliography ==
- Bertie, David M. (2000). Scottish Episcopal Clergy, 1689–2000. Edinburgh: T & T Clark. ISBN 0567087468.
- Keith, Robert (1824). Russel, Michael (ed.). An Historical Catalogue of the Scottish Bishops: Down To The Year 1688. Edinburgh: Printed for Bell and Bradfute.

Scottish Episcopal Church titles
| Preceded by Arthur Millar | Bishop of Edinburgh; 1727–1733 | Succeeded by David Freebairn |
| Preceded by Arthur Millar | Primus of the Scottish Episcopal Church; 1727–1731 | Succeeded by David Freebairn |
