= Andrew Cant =

Andrew Cant may refer to:

- Andrew Cant (minister) (1590–1663), Presbyterian minister and leader of the Scottish Covenanters
- Andrew Cant (educator) (died 1728), Principal of the University of Edinburgh from 1675 to 1685 and son of the above
- Andrew Cant (bishop) (1649–1730), clergyman of the Scottish Episcopal Church
- Andrew Cant (footballer) (1899–?), Scottish professional footballer
