= Chancellor of the University of Glasgow =

Titular head of the University of Glasgow

The chancellor is the titular head of the University of Glasgow and president of the general council, by whom they are elected. The office is intended to be held for life. Their principal duty is to confer degrees upon those presented to them by the Senate, although this role is usually carried out by the vice-chancellor, the appointment of whom is the chancellor's second-most important duty.

The current chancellor is Dame Katherine Grainger, the first woman to hold the office.

== History ==
From the university's establishment in 1451, the office was held by the archbishop of Glasgow, except in the case of Lord Blantyre, who held all the powers of the archbishop as 'Lord of Glasgow'. This trend ceased with the appointment of the Duke of Hamilton as chancellor in 1642, although resumed from 1661 to 1692 for a subsequent run of seven archbishops, from Andrew Fairfoul to John Paterson.

Five of the eight chancellors in the past hundred years have been alumni of the university. The Earl of Roseberry, a former prime minister, was educated at Oxford; Sir Daniel Macauley Stevenson did not attend university but was a generous benefactor of the university; and Sir Donald MacAlister, who studied at the University of Cambridge served as principal between 1909 and 1929. Sir William Kerr Fraser had also been principal prior to his appointment and, other than the most recent two chancellors, is the only holder in the past hundred years not to have died in office.

== List of chancellors ==
- William Turnbull (1451)
- Andrew de Durisdere (1456)
- John Laing (1474)
- Robert Blackadder (1483)
- James Beaton (1508)
- Gavin Dunbar (1524)
- James Beaton II (1551–1560)
- John Porterfield (1571)
- James Boyd (1572)
- Robert Montgomery (1581)
- William Erskine (1585)
- Walter Stewart, 1st Lord Blantyre (1587)
- John Spottiswoode (1603)
- James Law (1615)
- Patrick Lindsay (1633)
- James Hamilton, 3rd Marquess of Hamilton (1642)
- John Thurloe (1658)
- William Cunningham, 9th Earl of Glencairn (1660)
- Andrew Fairfoul (1661)
- Alexander Burnet (1664)
- Robert Leighton (1672)
- Alexander Burnet (1674)
- Arthur Ross (1679)
- Alexander Cairncross (1684)
- John Paterson (1687)
- John Carmichael, 1st Earl of Hyndford (1692)
- James Graham, 1st Duke of Montrose (1714)
- William Graham, 2nd Duke of Montrose (1743)
- James Graham, 3rd Duke of Montrose (1781)
- James Graham, 4th Duke of Montrose (1837)
- Sir William Stirling-Maxwell of Pollock (1875)
- Walter Montagu-Douglas-Scott, 5th Duke of Buccleuch (1878)
- John Hamilton Dalrymple, 10th Earl of Stair (1884)
- William Thomson, 1st Baron Kelvin (1904) *
- Archibald Primrose, 5th Earl of Rosebery (1908)
- Sir Donald MacAlister, 1st Baronet (1929)
- Sir Daniel Macaulay Stevenson (1934–1944)
- John Boyd Orr, 1st Baron Boyd-Orr (1946) *
- Sir Alexander Kirkland Cairncross (1972) *
- Sir William Kerr Fraser (1996) *
- Professor Sir Kenneth Calman (2006) *
- Dame Katherine Grainger (2020) *

* denotes alumni

== See also ==
- Ancient university governance in Scotland
- Principal of the University of Glasgow
- Rector of the University of Glasgow
