= James Drummond (bishop) =

Bishop of Brechin

James Drummond (1629–13 April 1695) was a seventeenth-century Scottish minister of the Church of Scotland who rose to be Protestant Bishop of Brechin.

== Life ==
The third son of the Reverend James Drummond, minister of Fowlis Wester in Strathearn, he was educatyed at St Andrews University graduating MA in 1645.

He began his church career around 1650 as minister of Auchterarder, before becoming the incumbent at Muthill (Strathearn) in 1655.

In October 1682 St Andrews University awarded him a Doctor of Divinity.

When in December 1684, the Bishop of Brechin, Alexander Cairncross, became Archbishop of Glasgow, Drummond was appointed his successor at Brechin; receiving consecration at Holyroodhouse by Archbishop Rose on 25 December 1684. Drummond was said to owe his promotion to James Drummond, Earl of Perth, then Chancellor of Scotland.

Bishop Drummond, like all Scottish bishops, was deprived of his temporalities after the Revolution of 1688, and preached his last sermon at Brechin on 14 April 1689. Afterwards, he spent much time in Slains Castle near Cruden Bay, the home of John Hay, 12th Earl of Erroll and his wife, Lady Anne Drummond (Bishop Drummond's cousin). He did much work for the parish and built the bridge called the "Bishop's Bridge".

He died of dropsy on 13 April 1695, aged sixty-six years old. He is buried in Cruden parish churchyard. He left the earl his library of 360 books.

He was unmarried and had no children.

Church of Scotland titles
Preceded by Alexander Cairncross	Bishop of Brechin; 1684–1689	Episcopacy abolished
