= Common Awards =

Common Awards are qualifications for ordinands and lay ministers within the Church of England and its partners in the Baptist, Methodist, and United Reformed churches, delivered in a three-way partnership between theological education institutions, the churches, and Durham University.

== History ==
Before 2014, theological education institutions (TEIs) within the Church of England used local universities to validate their qualifications. From September 2014 they have offered awards common across all institutions, validated by Durham University. The Methodist Church was a partner church with the Church of England in the development of the Common Awards. Bristol Baptist College joined the Common Awards in 2014 through a partnership with the Anglican Trinity College Bristol; a second Baptist institution, Luther King House, joined the scheme in 2020. In 2016, the Scottish Episcopal Church joined the scheme, with the Scottish Episcopal Institute becoming one of the TEIs in the programme. In 2021, the Church in Wales also joined, with St Padarn's Institute transferring validation for its postgraduate courses from Cardiff University to the Common Awards.

In 2022, St Stephen's House, Oxford was forced to give up its status as a Permanent Private Hall (PPH) of the University of Oxford in order to continue delivering Common Awards as that university decided not to allow a PPH to deliver qualifications from another university.

In 2024, the Common Awards were called "an exercise in the neo-colonial rubrics of bourgeois acceptability politics", in an academic paper by Black theologian Anthony G. Reddie that asked "How can Common Awards support a decolonised and anti-oppressive curriculum given the wider white historic, ecclesial religio-cultural, intellectual framework to which it is beholden?"

Also in 2024, following the decision by Cardiff University to close its LLM in canon law, an MA in theology with a specialism in canon law was launched by St Padarn's Institute within the Common Awards framework. From 2025, this became a stand-alone MA in church law within the Common Awards rather than a specialisation within the theology MA.

== Description ==
The Common Awards include certificates, diplomas and degrees. They provide for ordinands from a wide variety of academic backgrounds, with entry requirements of one A level or equivalent and an allowance for admission based on 'relevant work experience'.

A wide variety of courses are offered at various levels of the Framework for Higher Education Qualifications (FHEQ):

- Foundation Award in Theology, Ministry and Mission (FHEQ level 4; 60 credits)
- Certificate of Higher Education in Theology, Ministry and Mission (FHEQ level 4; 120 credits)
- Certificate of Higher Education in Christian, Ministry and Mission (FHEQ level 5; 180 credits)
- Diploma of Higher Education in Theology, Ministry and Mission (FHEQ level 5; 240 credits)
- BA in Theology, Ministry and Mission (FHEQ level 6; 360 credits)
- Graduate Certificate in Theology, Ministry and Mission to postgraduate studies (FHEQ level 6; 60 credits)
- Graduate Diploma in Theology, Ministry and Mission to postgraduate studies (FHEQ level 6; 120 credits)
- Postgraduate Certificate in Theology, Ministry and Mission (FHEQ level 7; 60 credits)
- Postgraduate Certificate in Chaplaincy Studies (FHEQ level 7; 60 credits)
- Postgraduate Diploma in Theology, Ministry and Mission (FHEQ level 7; 120 credits)
- Postgraduate Diploma in Chaplaincy Studies (FHEQ level 7; 120 credits)
- MA in Theology, Ministry and Mission (FHEQ level 7; 180 credits)
- MA in Chaplaincy Studies (FHEQ level 7; 180 credits)
- MA in Contemporary Christian Leadership (FHEQ level 7; 180 credits)

== Participating institutions ==
The Theological Education Institutes (and church affiliations for those without Wikipedia articles) validated by Durham University on the Common Awards as of June 2026 are:

- Cambridge Theological Federation
- Cranmer Hall, Durham
- Lindisfarne College of Theology, North Shields (Church of England)
- The Queen's Foundation, Birmingham
- Ripon College Cuddesdon and Oxford Ministry Course, Oxfordshire
- St Mellitus College, London
- St Stephen's House, Oxford
- St Augustine's College of Theology, West Malling, Kent
- Spiritus Theological College, Exeter (Church of England)
- Trinity College with Bristol Baptist College, Bristol
- Yorkshire Theological Education Partnership
- South Central Theological Education Institution, Guildford, Oxford, and Winchester (Church of England)
- Scottish Episcopal Institute
- The Eastern Region Ministry Course, Cambridge
- Luther King Theological College, Manchester (United Reformed Church and Baptist Union of Great Britain)
- St Padarn's Institute, Llandaff
- Emmanuel Theological College, Liverpool and the North West (Church of England)
- Sarum College, Salisbury
- Oak Hill College, London
