= David Freebairn =

Scottish clergyman

The Right Reverend David Freebairn M.A.
- Bishop of Edinburgh; Primus of the Scottish Episcopal Church
- Church: Scottish Episcopal Church
- Elected: 28 June 1733
- In office: 1733-1739
- Predecessor: Andrew Lumsden
- Successor: William Falconer
- Other post: Primus of the Scottish Episcopal Church (1731-1738)

Orders
- Consecration: 17 October 1722 by John Fullarton

Personal details
- Born: 1653
- Died: 24 December 1739 (aged 85–86)
- Denomination: Anglican
- Education: University of St Andrews

Styles of David Freebairn, M.A.
- Reference style: The Most Reverend
- Spoken style: My Lord or Bishop

David Freebairn, M.A. (1653–1739) was a Scottish clergyman who served as a minister in the Church of Scotland, before becoming a prelate in the Scottish Episcopal Church in which he was Bishop of Galloway (1731–1733), Primus of the Scottish Episcopal Church (1731–1738) and Bishop of Edinburgh (1733–1739).

== Early life and family ==
He was born in 1653, the son of the Reverend Robert Freebairn, Incumbent of Gask, Perthshire. He was educated at the University of St Andrews, obtaining a Master of Arts degree on 23 July 1672. He married twice, firstly to Jean Graham (died July 1697) and secondly in 1699 to Anna Dobie, daughter of Richard Dobie (brother of Sir Robert Dobie of Stanihill). By his first wife, he had three sons and one daughter.

== Ecclesiastical career ==
He was recommended for licence to minister by Church of Scotland Presbytery of St Andrews on 24 June 1675. His first ecclesiastical appointment was as an assistant minister at Gask, Perthshire (1676–1680), followed by as the Incumbent of Auchterarder (1680–1686), and then the Incumbent of Dunning (1686–1691). He came under a sentence of deprivation from the Privy Council, dated 4 September 1689, for not reading the Proclamation of the Estates, not praying for William III and Mary II, etc. He retired to Edinburgh in 1691, where he became a bookseller, but returned to the ministry in the Scottish Episcopal Church and set up a meeting house in Bailie Fyfe's Close. He was one of the seventeen Edinburgh clergy who in 1708 were summoned before the Lords of Judiciary for exercising their ministerial functions in the city, and they were ordered on 13 March 1708 "to desist from keeping any Meeting House within the City of Edinburgh, Leith, and Canongate, etc." He was prosecuted with other Edinburgh clergy in 1716 by order of the Commission of Justiciary for not praying for King George I, but was assoilzied. He was one of the Edinburgh clergy who met in March 1720 to elect Bishop Rose's successor.

He was consecrated a college bishop at Edinburgh on 17 October 1722 by Primus Fullarton and Bishops Millar and Irvine. He and other college bishops were consecrated to maintain the Episcopal succession without being committed to a particular Episcopal see. Nine years later, he became the Bishop of Galloway and Primus in December 1731. He was translated from Galloway to Edinburgh on 28 June 1733, but continued as Primus until deprived of that office in July 1738.

He remained as Bishop of Edinburgh until his death on 24 December 1739, aged 86.

== Bibliography ==
- Bertie, David M. (2000). Scottish Episcopal Clergy, 1689-2000. Edinburgh: T & T Clark. ISBN 0567087468.
- Scott, Hew (1923). Fasti Ecclesiae Scoticanae. Vol. 4 (New ed.). Edinburgh: Oliver and Boyd.

Scottish Episcopal Church titles
Preceded by See administered by the Bishops of Edinburgh	Bishop of Galloway; 1731–1733	Succeeded by See administered by the Bishops of Edinburgh
Preceded by Andrew Lumsden	Primus of the Scottish Episcopal Church; 1731–1738	Succeeded by Thomas Rattray
Preceded by Andrew Lumsden	Bishop of Edinburgh; 1733–1739	Succeeded by See vacant followed by William Falconer
