= Colin Falconer (bishop) =

Colin Falconer (1623–1686) was a 17th-century Scottish minister and Church of Scotland bishop.

== Life ==
Born in 1623, he was the son of Beatrix Falconer née Dunbar and her husband William Falconer of Dunduff. He graduated in the liberal arts at St Leonard's College, University of St Andrews, and moved on to become a clergyman. His first charge, Essil parish church in the diocese of Moray, was held until he was translated to Forres parish.

He held this position until, on 5 September 1679, he was elevated to episcopal rank, having been selected as the new Bishop of Argyll. He did not hold this position for very long, as he was translated to the wealthier diocese of Moray in February the following year. Bishop Falconer had a good reputation for his hospitality and piety, and well as his diplomatic skills. He remained Bishop of Moray until his death at Spynie Castle on 11 November 1686, aged 63 years old.

Church of Scotland titles
| Preceded by Arthur Rose | Bishop of Argyll; 1679–1680 | Succeeded by ---- MacLean |
| Preceded by James Aitken | Bishop of Moray; 1680–1686 | Succeeded by Alexander Rose |
