= Alexander Cairncross (bishop) =

Scottish archbishop and Irish Bishop

Alexander Cairncross (1637–1701) was Archbishop of Glasgow 1684–1687.

== Life ==
Alexander Cairncross was descended from the ancient family of Cairncross of Cowmull. For some time he followed the trade of a dyer in the Canongate of Edinburgh. Subsequently, he became parson of Dumfries, where he remained until 1684 when, by the recommendation of the Duke of Queensberry, he was promoted to the see of Brechin, from which he was in a few months promoted to that of Glasgow. Having incurred the displeasure of the Lord Chancellor, the Earl of Perth, he was in January 1687 removed from the see, but after the Glorious Revolution he obtained the notice of the new powers, and in 1693 was made Bishop of Raphoe in Ireland, where he remained until his death on 14 May 1701. By will he left a great deal of money to the poor of the parish of Raphoe, and the tenth part of his personal estate to the episcopal clergy of the Kingdom of Scotland. He was buried in the Cathedral of Raphoe.

Religious titles
| Preceded by Robert Douglas | Bishop of Brechin; 1684 | Succeeded by James Drummond |
| Preceded by Arthur Rose | Archbishop of Glasgow; 1684–1687 | Succeeded by John Paterson |
| Preceded by William Smyth | Bishop of Raphoe; 1693–1701 | Succeeded by Robert Huntington |
Academic offices
| Preceded by Arthur Ross | Chancellor of the University of Glasgow; 1684–1687 | Succeeded by John Paterson |
