= Scottish Episcopal Institute =

- Established: October 2015; 10 years ago
- Religious affiliation: Scottish Episcopal Church
- Academic affiliation: Durham University (validating university)

The Scottish Episcopal Institute (SEI) is the theological college of the Scottish Episcopal Church, the Anglican church in Scotland. It provides training and theological education to those preparing for lay and ordained ministries in the Scottish Episcopal Church. It also provides training for leaders of the United Reformed Church. The SEI was formally launched in October 2015, and replaced the Theological Institute of the Scottish Episcopal Church.

== Education ==
Since 2016, the Scottish Episcopal Institute has been involved in the Common Awards, and as such has its academic qualifications validated by Durham University.

As of 2021, the SEI has three formation pathways over the first three years of ministerial education:

- Part-time study on the Common Awards, with ordinands and lay candidates continuing in their regular jobs
- Full-time mixed-mode training on the Common Awards, with ordinands becoming part of a ministerial team for on-the-job training and also training part-time with the SEI
- Full-time study, with ordinands attending New College of the University of Edinburgh to study for a Master of Divinity degree and also training part-time with the SEI

The Common Awards programmes lead to a 240-credit Diploma of Higher Education, equivalent to the first two years of an English undergraduate degree (Durham University being an English university). As ordinands headed for incumbency are expected to have a degree in theology by the end of their sixth year of training, the SEI offers the 360-credit Common Awards BA in theology, Ministry and Mission in years four to six, requiring a further 120 credits of study (equivalent to one year full-time) on top of the diploma.

== Journal ==
The institute has published The Scottish Episcopal Institute Journal since 2017. It is published quarterly, and is peer-reviewed and open-access.

== Notable people ==
- The Revd Canon Anne Tomlinson was the principal of the SEI at its foundation. She retired in July 2023
- The Rev Canon Prof Michael Hull, is currently the principal of the SEI.
