= Primus of the Scottish Episcopal Church =

The primus of the Scottish Episcopal Church, styled "The Most Reverend the Primus of the Scottish Episcopal Church", is the presiding bishop of the Scottish Episcopal Church. As of 27 June 2017 the Primus is Mark Strange.

The word primus literally means "first" in Latin and is cognate to the related episcopal title Primate.

== Roles ==
The Primus of the Scottish Episcopal Church has the following tasks:

- to preside at all provincial liturgical functions
- to preside at all meetings of the General Synod of the Scottish Episcopal Church
- to preside at all meetings of the Episcopal Synod
- to declare and carry out the resolutions of the General Synod, the Episcopal Synod and the College of Bishops
- to represent the Scottish Episcopal Church in its relation to all other churches of the Anglican Communion and other communions
- to perform the functions and duties of primus as specified in the canons of the Scottish Episcopal Church
- to correspond on behalf of the Scottish Episcopal Church with primates, metropolitans and the secretary general of the Anglican Consultative Council.

== History ==
The primus does not have any metropolitan jurisdiction. Metropolitan responsibilities are held by the diocesan bishops. The last head of the Scottish Episcopal Church to hold both primate and metropolitan titles was Arthur Rose, Archbishop of St Andrews, up to his death in 1704. The last bishop to exercise metropolitan authority was Alexander Rose, Bishop of Edinburgh, up to his death in 1720.

== Bishops elected as primus ==
Holders of the role since the creation of the post in the early 18th century.

Primuses of the Scottish Episcopal Church
From	Until	Incumbent	Notes
1720	1727	John Fullarton	Bishop of Edinburgh, 1720–1727.
May 1727	Oct 1727	Arthur Millar	Bishop of Edinburgh, May–Oct 1727.
1727	1731	Andrew Lumsden	Bishop of Edinburgh, 1727–1733.
1731	1738	David Freebairn	Bishop of Galloway, 1731–1733; Bishop of Edinburgh, 1733–1739.
1738	1743	Thomas Rattray	Bishop of Dunkeld, 1727–1743.
1743	1757	Robert Keith	Bishop of Caithness, Orkney and The Isles, 1731–1757.
1757	1761	Robert White	Bishop of Fife, 1743–1761.
1762	1782	William Falconer	Bishop of Moray, 1742–1778; Bishop of Edinburgh, 1776–1784.
1782	1788	Robert Kilgour	Bishop of Aberdeen, 1768–1786.
1788	1816	John Skinner	Bishop of Aberdeen, 1786–1816.
1816	1837	George Gleig	Bishop of Brechin, 1810–1840.
1837	1841	James Walker	Bishop of Edinburgh, 1830–1841.
1841	1857	William Skinner	Bishop of Aberdeen, 1816–1857.
1857	1862	Charles Terrot	Bishop of Edinburgh, 1841–1872.
1862	1886	Robert Eden	Bishop of Moray, Ross & Caithness, 1851–1886.
1886	1901	Hugh Jermyn	Bishop of Brechin, 1875–1903.
1901	1904	James Kelly	Bishop of Moray, Ross & Caithness, 1886–1904.
1904	1907	George Wilkinson	Bishop of St Andrews, Dunkeld & Dunblane, 1893–1907.
1908	1934	Walter Robberds	Bishop of Brechin, 1904–1934.
1935	1943	Arthur Maclean	Bishop of Moray, Ross & Caithness, 1904–1943.
1943	1946	Logie Danson	Bishop of Edinburgh, 1939–1946.
1946	1952	John How	Bishop of Glasgow & Galloway, 1938–1952.
1952	1962	Thomas Hannay	Bishop of Argyll & The Isles, 1942–1962.
1962	1973	Francis Moncreiff	Bishop of Glasgow & Galloway, 1952–1973.
1974	1977	Richard Wimbush	Bishop of Argyll & The Isles, 1963–1977.
1977	1985	Alastair Haggart	Bishop of Edinburgh, 1975–1985.
1985	1990	Ted Luscombe	Bishop of Brechin, 1975–1990.
1990	1992	George Henderson	Bishop of Argyll & The Isles, 1977–1992.
1992	2000	Richard Holloway	Bishop of Edinburgh, 1986–2000.
2000	2006	Bruce Cameron	Bishop of Aberdeen & Orkney, 1992–2006.
2006	2009	Idris Jones	Bishop of Glasgow & Galloway, 1998–2009.
2009	2016	David Chillingworth	Bishop of St Andrews, Dunkeld & Dunblane, 2004–2016.
2017	present	Mark Strange	Bishop of Moray, Ross, & Caithness, 2007–present

== See also ==
- Religion in the United Kingdom

== Bibliography ==
- Bertie, David M. (2000). Scottish Episcopal Clergy, 1689-2000. Edinburgh: T & T Clark. ISBN 0-567-08746-8.
