= James Aitken (bishop) =

Scottish prelate

The Right Reverend James Aitken
- Bishop of Galloway
- See: Diocese of Galloway
- In office: 1680–1687
- Predecessor: Arthur Rose
- Successor: John Gordon
- Previous post: Bishop of Moray

Orders
- Consecration: 28 October 1679, as Bishop of Moray

Personal details
- Born: 1612 or 1613 Kirkwall, Orkney
- Died: 15 November 1687 Edinburgh

Bishop James Aitken (1613–1687) was a 17th-century Scottish prelate.

== Life ==
He was born in 1613 in Kirkwall, Orkney, the son of Henry Aitken, commissary and sheriff of Orkney and Shetland, and his wife, Elizabeth Buchanan.

After his school days at Kirkwall Grammar School, he attended the University of Edinburgh, graduating on 23 July 1636, with an MA. Subsequently, he travelled to England to study divinity at the University of Oxford. Returning to Scotland as the chaplain of James, Marquess of Hamilton, he was given charge of the churches of Harray and Birsay on 27 June 1641.

Aitken remained a staunch royalist during the English Civil War, and after the failure in 1650 of the campaign of James Graham, 1st Marquess of Montrose, fled to the Netherlands. He returned to Scotland during the Cromwellian Protectorate and resided in Edinburgh for most of the period between 1653 and 1660, moving his family from Orkney. With the Restoration of the latter year and the return of the monarchy, Aitken's known loyalty to the crown was rewarded with patronage. This began with a cash payment in May 1661, and later in that year, the church of Winfrith in Dorset.

After about 16 years in England, in June 1676 Aitken was elevated to the position of Bishop of Moray, receiving consecration two years later, on 28 October 1679. His brief period as Bishop of Moray came to an end when, on 6 February 1680, he was translated to the diocese of Galloway. As Bishop of Galloway, he received permission to reside in Edinburgh because, in the words of Robert Keith, "it was thought unreasonable to oblige a reverend prelate of his years to live among such a rebellious and turbulent people" He died on 15 November 1687, and was buried in Greyfriars Church, Edinburgh. The cause of death was apoplexy. John Hamilton, Bishop of Dunkeld, carried out his funeral eulogy.

== Notes ==
Church of Scotland titles
Preceded by Murdoch MacKenzie	Bishop of Moray; 1677–1680	Succeeded by Colin Falconer
Preceded by Arthur Rose	Bishop of Galloway; 1680–1687	Succeeded by John Gordon
