= Arthur Millar =

Scottish bishop (1649-1727)

The Right Reverend Arthur Millar
- Bishop of Edinburgh; Primus of the Scottish Episcopal Church
- Church: Scottish Episcopal Church
- Elected: 1727
- In office: 1727
- Predecessor: John Fullarton
- Successor: Andrew Lumsden
- Other post: Primus of the Scottish Episcopal Church (1727)

Orders
- Consecration: 22 October 1718 by Alexander Rose

Personal details
- Born: 1649
- Died: 9 October 1727 (aged 77–78)
- Denomination: Anglican
- Education: University of Aberdeen

Arthur Millar (1649 – 9 October 1727) was a Scottish Anglican bishop in the first third of the 18th century.

Millar was born in 1649 and educated at the University of Aberdeen. He was the incumbent at Dumbarton, Musselburgh then Leith. He was consecrated a college bishop on 22 October 1718 and became Bishop of Edinburgh and Primus of the Scottish Episcopal Church on 5 May 1727.

He died on 9 October 1727.

Scottish Episcopal Church titles
Preceded by John Fullarton	Bishop of Edinburgh; May 17127 – October 1727	Succeeded by Andrew Lumsden
Preceded by John Fullarton	Primus of the Scottish Episcopal Church; May 1727 – October 1727	Succeeded by Andrew Lumsden
