= Andrew Cant (bishop) =

Scottish bishop (1649–1730)

Andrew Cant (1649–1730) was a clergyman of the Scottish Episcopal Church.

== Life ==
He was the younger son of Rev Alexander Cant minister of Banchory and was born in the manse there.

He was educated at King's College, Aberdeen graduating with an MA in 1668 and ordained in 1671 as Second Charge of South Leith Parish Church. In 1679 he became minister of Trinity College Church in Edinburgh, one of the most prestigious positions of the time. He left in 1689 for his political views. It is unclear what he did from 1689 to 1722.

He was consecrated college bishop (i.e. a bishop without a diocese) as Bishop of the Non-jurant Church in Glasgow on 17 October 1722 by Bishop John Fullarton.

He died on 21 April 1730.

== Family ==
His uncle was Andrew Cant minister of Trinity College Church 1673 to 1675, and this certainly helped in his being created minister there. His uncle was Principal of the University of Edinburgh.

In 1694 he married Margaret Thomson, second daughter of James Thomson, Clerk of the Exchequer, and widow of William Stevenson, merchant. Their daughter Jean Cant married John Gordon an Edinburgh burgess and merchant.

== Publications ==
- Sermon Preached on 30 January 1703 on the Anniversary of the Execution of Charles I
- Sermon Preached on 30 January 1715 on the Anniversary of the Execution of Charles I
