= David Ranken =

Scottish bishop

David Ranken was consecrated a college bishop (i.e. a bishop without a diocese) on 11 June 1727.
