= John Sage =

Scottish clergy

John Sage (1652–1711) was a Scottish nonjuring bishop and controversialist in the Jacobite interest.

== Life ==
He was born at Creich, Fife, where his ancestors had lived for seven generations. His father was a captain in the royalist forces at the time of the taking of Dundee by George Monck in 1651. Sage was educated at Creich parish school and St Salvator's College, St Andrews, where he graduated M.A. on 24 July 1669. Having been parish schoolmaster at Ballingry, Fife, and then Tippermuir, Perthshire, he entered on trials before Perth presbytery on 17 December 1673, and gained testimonial for license on 3 June 1674.

He became tutor and chaplain in the family of James Drummond of Cultmalundie, Perthshire. While residing with his pupils at Perth he made the acquaintance of Alexander Rose, then minister of Perth. He visited Rose at Glasgow in 1684, and was introduced to Rose's uncle, Arthur Ross, then archbishop of Glasgow, who ordained him, and instituted him in 1685 to the charge of the east quarter in Glasgow. He held the clerkship of presbytery and synod. In 1688 Ross, being then primate, nominated him to a divinity chair at St Andrews, but the completion of the appointment was prevented by the abdication of James II.

Driven from Glasgow by the Cameronian outbreak, Sage made his way to Edinburgh, and took up his pen in the cause of the extruded clergy. He carried with him nine volumes of the presbytery records, which were only recovered after 103 years according to Hew Scott. In 1693 he was banished from Edinburgh by the privy council for officiating as a nonjuror. He retired to Kinross, and found shelter in the house of Sir William Bruce. But in 1696 Bruce was committed to Edinburgh Castle, and a warrant was issued for the arrest of Sage. He hid himself in Angus, going by the name of Jackson, and giving out that he was come for a course of goat's milk. After a few months he became domestic chaplain, at Falkirk, to Anne, dowager countess of Callendar, and subsequently to Sir John Stewart of Grandtully, Perthshire.

On 25 January 1705 Sage was privately consecrated at Edinburgh, along with John Fullarton, as a college bishop (i.e. a bishop without diocese or jurisdiction), as part of the policy of continuing the nonjuring episcopal order, while respecting the right of the crown to nominate to sees. In November 1706 Sage was seized with paralysis while on a visit to Kinross. He recovered sufficiently to take part in a consecration at Dundee on 28 April 1709. He then went to Bath. Moving on to London, he remained there about a year. He died at Edinburgh on 7 June 1711; his intimate correspondent, Henry Dodwell the elder, died on the same day. Sage was buried in the churchyard of Old Greyfriars, Edinburgh. John Gillan in his Life of Sage gives a long Latin inscription intended for his tomb.

== Works ==
Most of Sage's publications were anonymous, but their authorship was well known; his controversial writings were shrewd. He published:

- ‘Letters concerning the Persecution of the Episcopal Clergy in Scotland,’ 1689, (anon.); Sage wrote the second and third letters, the first was by Thomas Morer, the fourth by Alexander Monro.
- ‘The Case of the afflicted Clergy in Scotland,’ 1690, (‘By a Lover of the Church and his Country’).
- ‘An Account of the late Establishment of the Presbyterian Government,’ 1693, (anon.)
- ‘The Fundamental Charter of Presbytery … examin'd,’ 1695; 2nd edit. 1697, (anon.; preface in answer to Gilbert Rule answered in ‘Nazianzeni Querela,’ 1697, by William Jameson (fl. 1689–1720).
- ‘The Principles of the Cyprianic Age,’ 1695; 2nd edit. 1717, (by ‘J. S.’).
- ‘A Vindication of … the Principles of the Cyprianic Age,’ 1695; 2nd edit. 1701, (in reply to Rule; this and the previous are answered in Jameson's ‘Cyprianus Isotimus,’ 1705).
- ‘Some Remarks on the late Letters … and Mr. [David] Williamson's Sermon,’ 1703.
- ‘A Brief Examination of … Mr. Meldrum's Sermon against a Toleration’, 1703.
- ‘The Reasonableness of Toleration to those of the Episcopal Perswasion,’ 1703; 2nd edit. 1705 (anon.; consists of four letters to George Meldrum).
- ‘An Account of the Author's Life and Writings,’ prefixed to Thomas Ruddiman's edition of Gawin Douglas's ‘Virgil's Æneis,’ 1710. He assisted Ruddiman in the edition, Edinburgh, 1711, of the works of William Drummond of Hawthornden, and wrote an introduction to Drummond's History of Scotland during the Reigns of the five Jameses.

Among his unfinished manuscripts was a criticism of the Westminster Confession of Faith. Gillan gives an account of other literary projects. His Works, with memoir, were issued by the Spottiswoode Society, Edinburgh, 1844–46, 3 vols.
