= Alexander Burnet =

Scottish clergyman (1615–1684)

Bishop Alexander Burnet (1615–1684) was a Scottish clergyman.

== Life ==
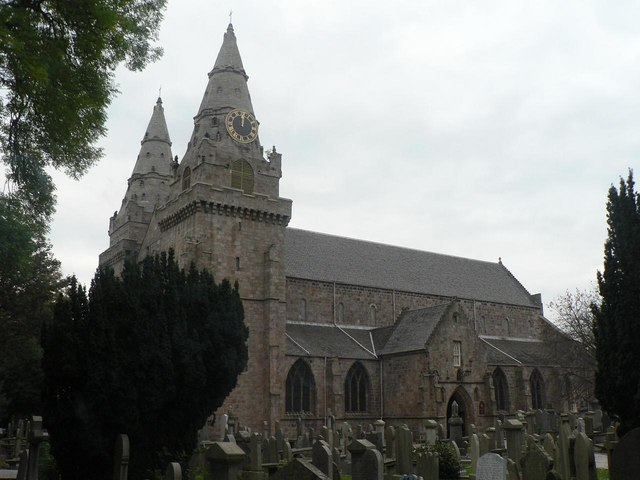
Aberdeen Cathedral (St Machar's)

Born in the summer of 1615 to James Burnet and Christian née Dundas, he gained an MA from the University of Edinburgh in 1633. He chose to follow the career of his father, who had been minister of Lauder, by becoming a churchman himself. He entered the service of his mother's kinsman the Earl of Traquair, becoming the personal chaplain of John Stewart, 1st Earl of Traquair.

This was the springboard for a high-level ecclesiastical career. He was presented to Coldingham in 1639 by King Charles I, but could not retain this position because of the National Covenant. Burnet went to exile in England, where he became a strong Royalist, something which forced him to flee to continental Europe. He returned to Great Britain after the Restoration of the monarchy, becoming rector of a parish church in Kent (Ivychurch) and chaplain to Andrew Rutherford, governor of Dunkirk.

The Restoration of the monarchy was followed by the restoration of Episcopacy in Scotland. Burnet became Bishop of Aberdeen in 1663. He held this position for less than a year, receiving promotion as the successor of Andrew Fairfoul to the Archbishopric of Glasgow. As Archbishop, he took a hard line on ecclesiastical non-conformity, and led the attempts to repress the Pentland Rising of 1666. His continued hard-line attitude, even after reconciliation became general policy, and his enmity against the Earl of Lauderdale, made him a controversial figure. He became too much of a liability for the King, who pressured him to resign as Archbishop. This he did on 24 December 1669.

Burnet went into England again. His high ecclesiastical career was revived in 1679, becoming Archbishop of St Andrews. He held this position until his death by illness on 22 August 1684. He was buried in St Salvator's Chapel.

Church of Scotland titles
Preceded by David Mitchel	Bishop of Aberdeen; 1663–1664	Succeeded by Patrick Scougal
Preceded by Andrew Fairfoul	Archbishop of Glasgow; 1664–1669	Succeeded by Robert Leighton
Preceded by Robert Leighton	Archbishop of Glasgow; 1674–1679	Succeeded by Arthur Rose
Preceded by James Sharp	Archbishop of St Andrews; 1679–1684	Succeeded by Arthur Rose
Academic offices
Preceded by Andrew Fairfoul	Chancellor of the University of Glasgow; 1664–1669	Succeeded by Robert Leighton
Preceded by Robert Leighton	Chancellor of the University of Glasgow; 1674–1679	Succeeded by Arthur Rose
Preceded by James Sharp; Archbishop of St Andrews	Chancellor of the University of St Andrews; 1679–1684	Succeeded by Arthur Rose; Archbishop of St Andrews
