= David Lindsay (bishop of Ross) =

- Bishop of Ross
- Church: Church of Scotland
- See: Diocese of Ross
- In office: 1600–1613
- Predecessor: Vacant; Last occupied by: John Lesley
- Successor: Patrick Lindsay
- Previous post(s): Chancellor of Brechin (fl. 1597)

Orders
- Consecration: 23/4 January 1611

Personal details
- Born: 1531; Scotland
- Died: 14 August 1613; Leith

David Lindsay (1531–1613) was one of the twelve original ministers nominated to the "chief places in Scotland" in 1560. In 1589 as one of the recognised leaders of the Kirk and as chaplain of James VI of Scotland, Lindsay accompanied James to Norway to fetch home his bride. He was appointed bishop of Ross and a privy councillor in 1600. He was five times Moderator of the General Assembly: 1577, 1582, 1586, 1593 and 1597.

== Biography ==
Lindsay was the son of Alexander Lindsay and wife Rachel Barclay, and nephew of David, 9th Earl of Crawford. He was said to have been a student of the University of St Andrews, though his name does not appear as such in any of the university records. He appears to have been an associate of John Knox in Geneva.

During travels in France and Switzerland Lindsay imbibed Reformation principles, and he was one of the twelve original ministers nominated in July 1560 to the "chief places in Scotland", the town assigned him being Leith. He was present in December following at the first meeting of the general assembly of the kirk, and thenceforth was one of its recognised leaders. He was moderator of the assembly which met in February 1568, and subsequently held the same office on five occasions. He visited Knox on his deathbed in 1572, and at Knox's request, though "he thought the message hard", went to the castle of Edinburgh to warn William Kirkcaldy of Grange that unless he gave it up he "should be brought down over the walls of it with shame and hang against the sun".

Lindsay visited Kirkcaldy after his condemnation, and was sent by him to Morton to intercede for his life, being empowered to offer Kirkcaldy's whole estate as a ransom. The intercession having failed, Lindsay, at Kirkcaldy's special request, attended him on the scaffold, and thus, according to Calderwood, became witness of the literal fulfilment of the doom pronounced by Knox. Always inclined to moderate counsels, Lindsay in 1579 took part in the successful mediation between Morton and the dissentient lords. On the arrival shortly afterwards of Esmé Stuart, the secret catholic emissary from France, Lindsay, at the king's request was, on account of his knowledge of French, appointed by the kirk to attend on him with a view to his conversion to protestantism.

By Lindsay's nominal success, he became the unconscious tool of Stuart in his designs against Morton. After the banishment of those concerned in the Ruthven raid, Lindsay endeavoured to obtain the co-operation of Robert Bowes, the English ambassador, to bring about a reconciliation between the two factions, but his endeavours were unsuccessful. He had gradually won considerable influence with the king, and acquired the reputation of being "the minister whom the court liked best". On this account he was in May 1584 selected by the ministers in and around Edinburgh to induce the king to delay his assent, until a meeting of the assembly, to certain acts circumscribing the authority of the kirk; but as he entered the palace gate he was apprehended and lodged in Blackness Castle. Here he had a remarkable dream, recorded at length by Calderwood. On the fall of Arran shortly afterwards, he was set at liberty. Lindsay was the only one of the ministers of the kirk – with the exception of the "king's own minister" – who complied with the request of the king to pray for Queen Mary before her execution.

As chaplain of the king Lindsay accompanied him in October 1589 when he set sail for Norway to bring home his bride, Anne of Denmark. Lindsay preached a sermon at Tønsberg on 16 November, which is commemorated on a surviving painted board, and on 23 November he married them at Oslo. He and Robert Bruce crowned them in the abbey kirk, Edinburgh, on 12 May 1590. At the baptism of the young Prince Henry at Stirling Castle, 23 August 1594, Lindsay delivered a learned speech to the ambassadors in French.

Lindsay came to Edinburgh from Falkland Palace in 1600 in order to assure the clergy of the truth of the official version of the Gowrie House conspiracy of 5 August 1600. When the clergy declined to order a general service of thanksgiving for the king's deliverance, a service was conducted by Lindsay at the market cross. On the arrival of the king at Leith, 16 August, Lindsay also preached a thanksgiving sermon in his own church. Soon afterwards he received a special mark of royal favour by his crown provision on 5 November 1600, in accordance with the act for the establishment of a modified episcopacy, to the bishopric of Ross. On 30 September he was also admitted a member of the privy council. His provision was renewed on 22 December 1604, on both occasions the honour was purely titular until the restoration of regular episcopal succession in 1610. He received consecration as bishop on 24 February 1611 in his home church of South Leith.

As bishop of Ross Lindsay sat and voted in parliament, but in the assembly of the kirk the new bishoprics were not recognised till November 1602. At that date commissions were appointed for general visitation; Lindsay and the other bishops were sent as commissioners to the districts of which they were bishops, and thus, laments James Melville, "thair was thrie bishops put in possession of thair bishoprics". Lindsay was one of those who accompanied King James to England, when he set out to take possession of the English throne. On 1 April 1604, he obtained a pension of 200 pounds per annum for life. At the parliament held at Perth in July of this year he was appointed a commissioner for the union with England. He died on 14 August 1613, "having", according to his son-in-law, Archbishop Spotiswood, "attained to fourscore and two or three years". "He was", says the same authority, "of a placable nature, and greatly favoured of the king, to whom he performed diverse good services, especially in the troubles he had with the church: a man universally beloved and well-esteemed of by all wise men". His corpse was interred at Leith churchyard by his own direction, as desiring to rest along with that people on whom he had taken great pains in his life.

== Family ==
He married firstly Joneta Ramsay, a daughter of George Ramsay of Clattie, and secondly Helen Harresoun. By his first marriage he had two sons and one daughter:

- Sir Jerome Lindsay of Annatland, who married in December 1595 Margaret Colville, daughter of John Colville and wife Janet Russell, and was knighted as Sir Jerome Lindsay of Annatland, and appointed Lord Lyon King of Arms
- Rev. David Lindsay (1566-1627), Minister of South Leith (1613-1627)
- Rachel Lindsay, who married John Spottiswoode, afterwards Archbishop of St. Andrews

== Notes ==
Religious titles
Vacant Title last held by John Lesley	Bishop of Ross; 1600–1613	Succeeded by Patrick Lindsay
