= John Carmichael, 1st Earl of Hyndford =

Scottish nobleman and politician

The Right Honourable Earl of Hyndford PC

Keeper of the Privy Seal of Scotland
- In office 1689–1690
- Monarchs: William III and Mary II
- Preceded by: The Earl of Kintore
- Succeeded by: The Earl of Melville

Secretary of State
- In office 1699–1702
- Monarchs: William III, Mary II, and Anne
- Preceded by: The Duke of Atholl
- Succeeded by: The Duke of Queensberry

Personal details
- Born: 28 February 1638 Carmichael, Lanarkshire, Scotland
- Died: 20 September 1710 (aged 72) Carmichael, Lanarkshire, Scotland
- Spouse: Beatrix Drummond
- Children: James Carmichael, 2nd Earl of Hyndford

John Carmichael, 1st Earl of Carmichael (28 February 1638 – 20 September 1710), known as Lord Carmichael between 1672 and 1701, when he was created the 1st Earl of Hyndford, was a Scottish nobleman and politician.

He succeeded his grandfather, James Carmichael, 1st Lord Carmichael (1579–1672), as second Lord Carmichael in 1672. He was Keeper of the Privy Seal of Scotland from 1689 to 1690, Lord High Commissioner to the General Assembly of the Church of Scotland in 1690, 1694, and 1699, and Chancellor of the University of Glasgow from 1692 to 1713. He was Secretary of State from 1699 to 1702, and supported the Union with England. He was a colonel of Dragoons from 1693 to 1697. His wife was Beatrix Drummond, a daughter of the 3rd Lord Maderty and Lady Beatrice Graham. Their daughter Beatrix married John Cockburn of Ormiston.

Political offices
Preceded by The Earl of Kintore	Keeper of the Privy Seal of Scotland; 1689–1690	Succeeded by The Earl of Melville
Preceded by The Duke of Atholl	Secretary of State; 1699–1702; With: The Earl of Seafield	Succeeded by The Duke of Queensberry
Academic offices
Preceded by John Paterson	Chancellor of the University of Glasgow; 1692–1713	Succeeded by The Duke of Montrose
Peerage of Scotland
New creation	Earl of Hyndford; 1701–1710	Succeeded by James Carmichael
Preceded by James Carmichael	Lord Carmichael; 1672–1710	Succeeded by James Carmichael
