= Alexander Duncan (bishop) =

Scottish bishop

Alexander Duncan (c.1655–1733) was a non-jurant Scottish Episcopal clergyman, college bishop (from 1724), and Bishop of Glasgow from 1731.

== Early Ministry ==
Duncan is thought to have been the son of William Duncan, the Minister of New Kilpatrick, in Dunbartonshire, and his wife, Janet Macarthur. He attended the University of Glasgow, graduating in 1675. In 1680 he became the minister of Kilbirnie in Ayrshire. At this period the structure of the Church of Scotland was Episcopalian. Along with many clergy with Episcopalian sympathies Duncan was rabbled from his parish in 1688, struck and abused, his furniture smashed, and he and his family thrust out of doors. The following year the Episcopalian structure of the Church was abolished by Act of the Scottish Parliament, disestablishing the Scottish Episcopalians.

== After Disestablishment ==
Duncan eventually made his way to Glasgow. Robert Cleland, writing in 1816, asserts that Duncan founded the Episcopalian congregation in the city in 1715 (the congregation now at St Mary's Cathedral), but there are several references to Duncan earlier than that. Documentary evidence is fragmentary, but it is likely that the Episcopalians of Glasgow had formed a discrete congregation from the time of the Revolution, and over the following years several clergy were attached to it. Duncan attended the deathbed of the young Lady Dundonald in nearby Paisley in 1710, and his name is included in a list of Glasgow’s Episcopalians dating from 1713, a list which also includes John Walkinshaw of Barrowfield (father of Clementina Walkinshaw, Sir John Bell and John Barns, former Provosts of Glasgow, and Sir Donald MacDonald of Sleat. During this period it seems that the congregation met mainly in private houses, including Sir John’s lodging in Saltmarket and probably in Barrowfield. A meetinghouse-chapel opened in 1712 was destroyed by a mob a few days after the death of Queen Anne in 1714. In 1715 several members of the congregation fought under James Edward Stuart at Sheriffmuir.

== Bishop ==
Although the Old Pretender’s campaign was unsuccessful and he returned to mainland Europe, contact with Episcopalians continued (indeed, John Walkinshaw acted as his ambassador in Vienna), and church appointments were presented to James Edward Stuart for approval. In 1724 he approved Alexander Duncan as a college bishop (i.e. a bishop without a diocese). Duncan was consecrated in Edinburgh by Bishop John Fullarton, Bishop Arthur Miller, and Bishop William Irvine, on the Feast of St James, 1724. In 1726 Duncan consecrated James Rose and John Ochterlonie as bishops.

Duncan considered support of the government of George I to be sinful. At this period, Episcopal clergy in Scotland could be licensed officially if they took an oath and agreed to pray for the monarchs who had replaced James VII and II. Duncan refused to do this, and continued to believe that the Stuart dynasty would again be restored, and the Church’s Episcopal structure re-established.

In 1728 a new Episcopal meeting house was opened in Broad Close opposite the old university buildings in Glasgow's High Street, with a Mr. Wingate as its minister. Neither Duncan nor Wingate had taken the necessary oaths, so the magistrates closed it again shortly afterwards. Wingate was sent packing, whilst Duncan, although threatened with imprisonment, was left alone. He was now very old, but he preached to a small congregation assembled in his own home, including several of the families mentioned in the list from 1713. In 1729, he baptized the infant son of a later Lady Dundonald.

In 1731, the Scottish bishops agreed that Duncan should be responsible for the Diocese of Glasgow, the last Episcopalian Archbishop of Glasgow, John Paterson, having died in 1708. Bishop Duncan died at Glasgow in January 1733, aged 78, leaving a son, Robert, a daughter, Grizzell, and quite a lot of debt. Forty-four years had elapsed since Disestablishment.

== Sources ==
- David M Bertie, Scottish Episcopal Clergy, 1689-2000 (2000)
- James Gordon, Glasghu Facies - The History of Glasgow (1873)
- Robert Wodrow, Analecta (1843); Correspondence (1842); Early Letters (1937)
