= Andrew Fairfoul =

Andrew Fairfoul (1610–7 November 1663) was the first post-Restoration Archbishop of Glasgow, from 1661 until his death in November 1663. He became Chancellor of the University of Glasgow after his consecration as Archbishop.

== Life ==
Fairfoul was born in Anstruther the son of John Fairfoul a prominent minister of the Church of Scotland who relocated to Dunfermline in August 1610.

He studied at the University of St Andrews. He became chaplain to the Earl of Rothes.

He was minister of Leslie before translating to North Leith Parish Church in 1636 (being formally presented by King Charles I in 1641). In 1652 he moved to be minister of Duns.

He was nominated for the Archbishopric by King Charles II and consecrated in London on 15 December 1661.

On 19 April 1662 Fairfoul made his public entry into Glasgow accompanied by the Earl of Glencairn, the Lord Chancellor of Scotland who was his predecessor as chancellor of the university. The university's historian James Coutts refers to him as "a man of boisterous mirth and careless life", but quotes the recollection of Principal Robert Baillie that Fairfoul preached "soberly and well" on his first Sunday in the city. The earl, the archbishop and their entourage dined at the university the day after this first sermon, and the meal is said to have cost more than £200.

The Archbishop was heavily involved in energetic attempts by the Episcopalian authorities to root out Covenanters and other dissenters. A committee of the Privy Council met in the fore-hall of the University on 1 October 1662 to address the problem of ministers refusing to recognise the rights of patrons and bishops to present ministers, and many ministers were removed from their parishes.

Fairfoul died on 7 November 1663 on his way to Edinburgh and was buried in the Abbey Church at Holyrood.

Church of Scotland titles
Vacant Title last held by Patrick Lindsay	Archbishop of Glasgow; 1661–1663	Succeeded by Alexander Burnet
