= James Law =

Minister of the Church of Scotland, Bishop of Orkney, Archbishop of Glasgow

The Most Reverend James Law
- Archbishop of Glasgow
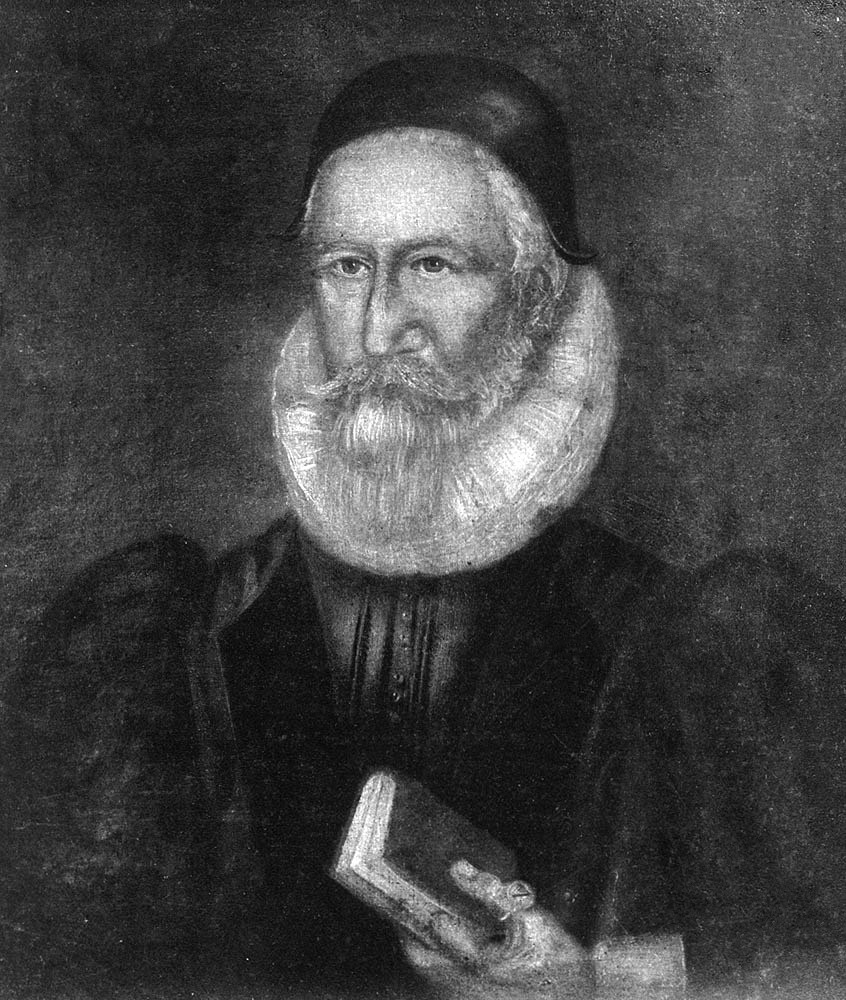
- See: Archdiocese of Glasgow
- Installed: 1615
- Term ended: 1632
- Predecessor: John Spottiswoode
- Successor: Patrick Lindsay

Orders
- Consecration: 1610/1611

Personal details
- Born: c. 1560 Kirkcaldy, Fife
- Died: 12 November 1632 Glasgow
- Buried: Glasgow Cathedral
- Denomination: Church of Scotland
- Parents: James Law of Spittal and Agnes Strang
- Spouse: Marion, Grizel Boswell
- Children: Margaret, James Law, Thomas Law, George Law, John Law, Jean Law, Isobel Law

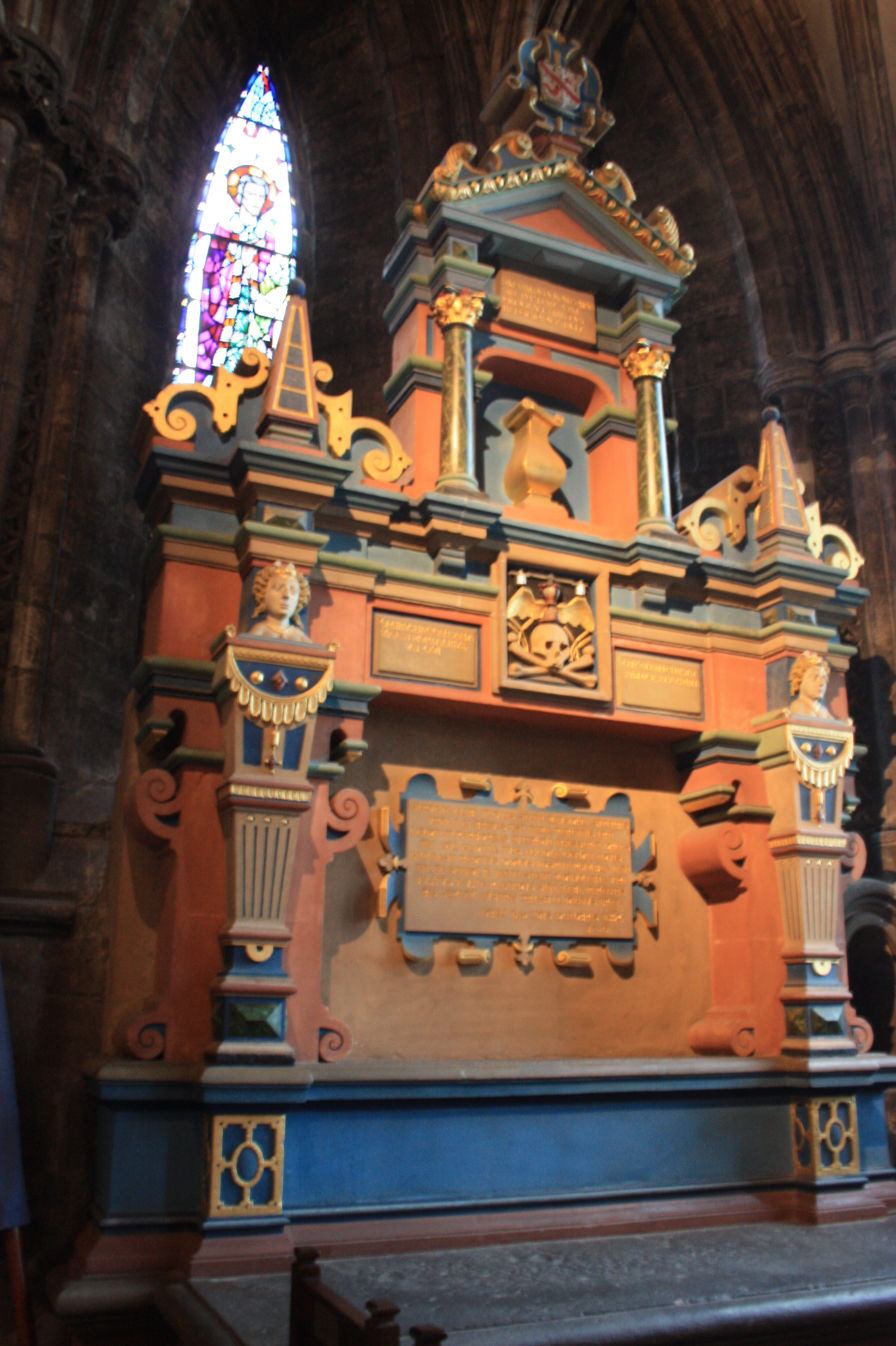
The grave of Archbishop James Law, Glasgow Cathedral

James Law (c. 1560 – 12 November 1632) was Archbishop of Glasgow. Entering the church after graduation from university, he rose to the position of Bishop of Orkney, reorganising the diocese, before rising to hold the position of Archbishop of Glasgow.

== Early life ==
Law was born the son of James Law of Spittal, a portioner (minor landowner) of Lathrisk, east of Falkland in Fife and illegitimate grandson of King James IV of Scotland and Agnes Isabella Stewart, Countess of Bothwell. His mother was Agnes Strang of Balcaskie House, north of Pittenweem in Fife.

He graduated at the University of St Andrews M.A. in 1581 and was ordained and admitted minister of Kirkliston in West Lothian in 1585. During his incumbency there he, and John Spottiswoode, then minister of Calder (based in Mid Calder, Midlothian), afterwards archbishop of St Andrews, were censured by the synod of Lothian for playing football on a Sunday.

== Bishop of Orkney ==
In 1600 he was put on the standing commission of the church, in 1601 appointed one of the royal chaplains, in 1605 titular bishop of Orkney, and in 1608 moderator of the general assembly. He preached before the Glasgow assembly of 1610 in defence of episcopacy. Law, along with John Spottiswoode, David Lindsay, and Peter Blackburn, received some of James VI's episcopal appointments.

Law became a nemesis to the Stewart earls who built for themselves a reputation as tyrants. He supported the cause of the people of Orkney against the oppression of Patrick Stewart, Earl of Orkney, and succeeded in getting the lands and jurisdiction of the bishopric separated from those of the earldom. He strengthened the rights and financial security of the bishopric of Orkney, and during his episcopate Scots Law replaced the earlier Norse Law for most purposes. Law relied on the support of a circle of influential merchant-lairds who were associated with local landed families.

Towards the end of his Orkney tenure, Bishop Law had an important role in the aftermath of the 1614 rebellion of Robert, the son of Patrick Stewart, 2nd Earl of Orkney. Government forces suppressing the rebellion had besieged Kirkwall Castle and utterly demolished it at the order of the Privy Council of Scotland. A similar fate was intended for the St. Magnus Cathedral, in which rebels had hidden. The intervention of the Bishop prevented that from happening, saving the Cathedral - considered a fine example of Romanesque architecture. Law is also said to have succeeded in persuading Stewart to surrender his father's houses.

== Archbishop of Glasgow ==
Through the influence of Archbishop Spottiswoode, "his old companion at football and condiscipulus", he was promoted to the archbishopric of Glasgow in 1615, where he completed the leaden roof of the cathedral. In 1616 he was appointed by the general assembly as one of a commission to prepare a book of canon for the church.

He died in 1632 and was buried in the chancel of Glasgow Cathedral (in the south-east corner), where there is a massive monument to his memory erected by his widow. Law was a favourite of King James VI and a zealous promoter of his ecclesiastical policy. He was a man of some learning, leaving in manuscript commentary on a part of scripture, and was commemorated by Dr. Arthur Johnston in some Latin verses.

== Marriage and family ==
He married twice. His first marriage was to Marion, a daughter of James Dundas of Newliston, West Lothian. They had one child, a daughter called Margaret, who married Patrick Turner, minister of Dalkeith, in 1612. His second marriage was to Grizel Boswell, a daughter of John Boswell of Balmuto, and by her he fathered six children, four sons and two daughters: James Law of Brunton, Thomas Law, who later became the minister of Inchinnan, George Law, John Law, Jean Law, and Isobel Law. A great-grandson of John Law was the economist John Law (1671-1729).

Religious titles
| Preceded by Adam Bothwell | Bishop of Orkney; 1605–1615 | Succeeded by George Graham |
| Preceded by John Spottiswoode | Archbishop of Glasgow; 1615–1632 | Succeeded by Patrick Lindsay |
