= John Paterson (archbishop of Glasgow) =

Scottish archbishop (1632–1708)

The Most Reverend John Paterson
- Archbishop of Glasgow
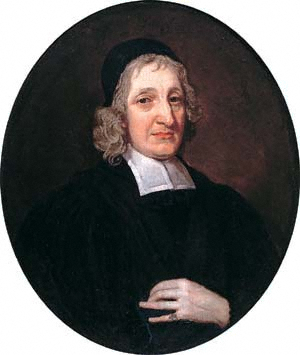
- Church: Church of Scotland
- See: Archdiocese of Glasgow
- In office: 1687–1689
- Predecessor: Alexander Cairncross
- Successor: Episcopacy abolished
- Previous posts: Bishop of Galloway; Bishop of Edinburgh

Orders
- Consecration: 1674 by Robert Leighton

Personal details
- Born: 1632 Scotland
- Died: 9 December 1708 (aged 75–76) Edinburgh

John Paterson (1632–1708) was the last Archbishop of Glasgow in the Church of Scotland. He was the youngest son of John Paterson, bishop of Ross. John, after some preliminary studies at Marischal College, University of Aberdeen, was admitted as a student of theology at the University of St Andrews on 13 March 1655, and he is entered as regent in St Leonard's College under date of 3 February 1658, indicating that he had taught the junior class in the preceding year.

== Biography ==
=== Early career ===
He probably continued to teach there until called to succeed his father, though not without some opposition, at Ellon on 6 November 1659, to which charge he was admitted before 15 July 1660. On 24 October 1662 he was elected by the town council of Edinburgh as minister of the Tron Church, and was admitted on 4 January following. From that charge he was promoted to the deanery of the High Kirk of Edinburgh (St Giles) on 12 July 1672, and was admitted a burgess and guild-brother of the city on 13 November 1673.

=== Bishop of Galloway ===
He strongly opposed the proposal of the more moderate party in the Scottish church in 1674 to hold a national synod. Through the influence of his patron, the Duke of Lauderdale, he was appointed on 20 October 1674 to Bishop of the see of Galloway, but was not consecrated until May 1675 at Edinburgh. For a few years father and son were thus occupants of Scottish sees at the same time. On 27 September 1678 he was appointed a privy councillor.

=== Bishop of Edinburgh ===
He was translated to the bishopric of Edinburgh on 29 March 1679. In the previous January he had obtained licence from the king to reside in Edinburgh, on the ground that he had not a competent manse or dwelling-house in Galloway. A pension was granted him on 9 July 1680. He is found assisting on 15 March 1685 at Lambeth at Sancroft's consecration of Baptist Levinz, the bishop of Sodor and Man.

On 20 July 1685 an order was made for an annual payment to him by the city of Edinburgh of twelve hundred marks until the city should build him a house and chapel. He went to London in February 1686, returning at the end of March to give the king assurances that the bishops would support his proposed toleration, although it was reported by the Duke of Hamilton in the following year that he was not in favour of such an entire repeal of the penal laws as the king desired.

=== Archbishop of Glasgow ===
He was rewarded by being nominated to the see of Glasgow on 21 January 1687, upon the illegal deprivation of Archbishop Alexander Cairncross. On 29 January 1688 he preached a thanksgiving sermon at Edinburgh for the queen's being with child, in which he mentioned that she often spent six hours at a time on her knees in prayer. At the Revolution he, with the majority of the bishops, adhered to James II. At the meeting of the estates in April 1689, when nine bishops were present, of whom seven were against declaring the throne vacant, "the Bishop of Glasgow made a long discourse of passive obedience".

=== After the revolution ===
He remained in Edinburgh, living in privacy, after the Revolution, but is said to have been arrested in 1692 on suspicion of holding correspondence with the exiled court, and to have been imprisoned in Edinburgh Castle. The authority for this statement is not given; and a further statement that he remained in prison until 1701 is incorrect, as, at some date previous to 1695, he was banished from Scotland to England, and was restrained to London. Among the papers of the Earl of Rosslyn at Dysart House there is a journal kept by Paterson in London in 1695–6, in which he records interviews with statesmen while seeking permission from William III of England to return to Scotland. Leave was at that time refused, and he was also forbidden to reside in any of the northern counties of England. He was, however, shortly afterwards permitted to return to Edinburgh, and probably regained complete liberty upon the accession of Queen Anne in 1702.

=== Episcopal clergy ===
In that year he wrote a letter from Edinburgh to Henry Compton, Bishop of London, on the subject of toleration for the episcopal clergy. He exerted himself in the following years, together with the other Scottish bishops, in endeavouring to obtain grants from the government for relief of poor clergymen, as well as some allowance for themselves out of the revenues of their sees. It was the queen's intention that such grants should be made, but it was not carried into real effect, except with regard to Bishop Alexander Rose of Edinburgh and Paterson himself.

On 7 December 1704 Paterson and Bishop Rose, with others, accredited Dr. Robert Scot, Dean of Glasgow, as an agent to make collections in England. Their letters, with a list of contributions, were printed in 1864. At the beginning of 1705 he went to London to approach the queen personally on the subject. He was favourably received, and obtained a promise of £1,600 annually, out of which George Lockhart of Carnwath charges him with securing £400 for himself, although he was then worth £20,000, or, as the Archbishop of Canterbury reported (according to Paterson's own statement), £30,000. But Paterson declared that he never had a third of the latter sum. On 25 January 1705, in consequence of the number of surviving bishops being reduced to five, he, with Bishops Rose and Douglas of Dunblane, consecrated, in a private chapel in his own house at Edinburgh, Bishops Fullarton and Sage.

=== Death ===
He died at his house in Edinburgh on 9 December 1708 and was buried on 23 December in the Chapel Royal of Holyrood , at the east end of the north side, at the foot of Bishop Wishart's monument. He married Margaret Wemyss of Contin in 1654. She had died before 1696, in which year he records in his diary an offer of marriage from Lady Warner. He speaks in several letters of his numerous family.

== Notes ==
Church of Scotland titles
Preceded by James Hamilton	Bishop of Galloway; 1676–1679	Succeeded by Arthur Rose
Preceded by Alexander Young	Bishop of Edinburgh; 1679–1687	Succeeded by Alexander Rose
Preceded by Alexander Cairncross	Archbishop of Glasgow; 1687–1689 (1708)	Episcopacy abolished in the official Church of Scotland Succeeded by Alexander Duncan (Scottish Episcopal Church)
Academic offices
Preceded by Alexander Cairncross	Chancellor of the University of Glasgow; 1687–1691	Succeeded by The Earl of Hyndford
