= Andrew Cant (footballer) =

Scottish footballer

Personal information
- Date of birth: 1899
- Place of birth: Glasgow, Scotland
- Height: 5 ft 10 in (1.78 m)
- Position: Centre forward

Senior career*
Years	Team	Apps	(Gls)
- East Fife
1922–1923	Bradford City	14	(3)
- East Fife
- * Club domestic league appearances and goals

Andrew Cant (born 1899) was a Scottish professional footballer who played as a centre forward.

== Career ==
Born in Glasgow, Cant played for East Fife and Bradford City. For Bradford City, he made 14 appearances in the Football League, scoring three goals; he also made 1 appearance in the FA Cup.

== Sources ==
- Frost, Terry (1988). Bradford City A Complete Record 1903-1988. Breedon Books Sport. ISBN 0-907969-38-0.
