= Arthur Rose =

Archbishop of St Andrews

The Most Reverend Arthur Rose
- Archbishop of St Andrews; Primate of Scotland
- Church: Scottish Episcopal Church
- Archdiocese: St Andrews
- In office: 1684–1704
- Predecessor: Alexander Burnet
- Successor: James Rose (As Bishop of Fife)

Orders
- Consecration: 28 April 1675 by Robert Leighton

Personal details
- Born: 1634
- Died: 13 June 1704 (aged 69–70) Edinburgh, Scotland
- Buried: Restalrig
- Parents: John Rose; Elizabeth Wood
- Spouse: Barbara Barclay
- Education: University of Aberdeen

Arthur Rose (also found as Ross; 1634–1704) was a Scottish minister, Archbishop of St Andrews, and, informally, the first Episcopal Primate of Scotland, after the fall of the Restoration Episcopate in 1689.

== Life ==
The younger son of Elizabeth Wood and her husband, John Rose, minister of Birse, he was born in 1634. Graduating from Marischal College on 9 July 1652, he chose to follow his father's church career, and on 5 April 1655, he received his licence from the presbytery of Garioch, obtaining the parish of Kinearny in the following year.

Rose's position in the church improved when he was moved to the nearby parish of Old Deer in Autumn 1663. In the following year he became rector of Marischal College, his alma mater, and later in the same year was given control of St Mungo's, Glasgow, after being persuaded by Alexander Burnet, then Archbishop of Glasgow. In 1675 he became Bishop of Argyll, while retaining control of the St Mungo's parsonage. On 5 September 1679, he was translated to the diocese of Galloway, having been elected as Bishop of Galloway earlier in the year.

However, Rose was not to be Bishop of Galloway for long, for in October of the same year he succeeded Burnet as Archbishop of Glasgow. Five years later he succeeded Alexander Burnet again, this time after the latter's death rather than promotion. Rose was formally installed as Archbishop of St Andrews and Primate of Scotland on 25 December 1684. Rose was archbishop until 22 July 1689, when parliament abolished all prelates in Scotland. He continued discreetly as an Episcopalian, remaining informally the primate until his death on 13 June 1704. He died at Campbell's Close in Canongate, Edinburgh, and was buried in the graveyard of the church of Restalrig.

Church of Scotland titles
Preceded by William Scrogie	Bishop of Argyll; 1675–1679	Succeeded by Colin Falconer
Preceded by John Paterson	Bishop of Galloway; 1679	Succeeded by James Aitken
Preceded by Alexander Burnet	Archbishop of Glasgow; 1679–1684	Succeeded by Alexander Cairncross
Preceded by Alexander Burnet	Archbishop of St Andrews; 1684–1689	Office abolished
Scottish Episcopal Church titles
New office	Primate and Metropolitan of the Scottish Episcopal Church; 1689–1704	Vacant Title next held by John Fullarton as Primus
Academic offices
Unknown	Rector of Marischal College, Aberdeen; 1664–?	Unknown
Preceded by Alexander Burnet	Chancellor of the University of Glasgow; 1679–1683	Succeeded by Alexander Cairncross
Preceded by Alexander Burnet; Archbishop of St Andrews	Chancellor of the University of St Andrews; 1684–1689	Succeeded by The Duke of Atholl
