= Patrick Lindsay (bishop) =

- Archbishop of Glasgow
- See: Archdiocese of Glasgow
- Installed: 1633
- Term ended: 1638
- Predecessor: James Law
- Successor: Andrew Fairfoul

Orders
- Consecration: 1 December 1613

Personal details
- Born: 1566 Unknown (possibly Monikie, Angus)
- Died: 1644 (aged 77–78) York, England
- Denomination: Church of Scotland
- Parents: John Lindsay and Unknown

Patrick Lindsay (1566–1644), bishop of Ross, archbishop of Glasgow, son of John Lindsay, and a cadet of the house of Lindsays of Edzell, Angus, was born in 1566, and studied at St Leonard's College, St Andrews, where he was laureated in 1587.

== Early career ==
In the following year he received the living of Guthrie in the presbytery of Arbroath (Angus synod). Thence he removed to St Vigeans between 1591 and 1593. He was a member of the general assemblies of 1590, 1602, 1608, 1609, 1610, 1616, and 1618. In 1608 he was among those nominated for the moderatorship. In 1610 he was appointed one of the examiners of the Marquess of Huntly, to test the sincerity of his pretended conversion.

He strongly supported the episcopalian schemes of James VI, and was rewarded for his compliance by being appointed one of the new court of high commission for Scotland in 1610, and was continued in it on its reconstruction in 1615 and 1634.

== Bishop of Ross ==
In 1613 he was promoted to the bishopric of Ross, being consecrated on 1 December 1613, was granted the infeftment of the barony of Doway Petterlie on 19 December 1615, and in the same year was sworn a member of the privy council of Scotland (31 March 1615). Along with the other Scottish bishops, he sought to press on the assembly the royal articles of 1617, and signed the proclamation of the privy council against the book called The Perth Assembly, 15 July 1619. He was one of the two bishops appointed to go to court about church affairs in July 1627.

== Archbishop of Glasgow ==
In 1633 he was installed archbishop of Glasgow. He signed the acts of the privy council authorising the New Service Book in October 1636 and June 1637, and according to Baillie was very diligent in charging all his presbyters "to try and use the New Service Book". He was accordingly included in the indictment of the bishops by the general assembly in 1638, the charge being first preferred against him in his own presbytery at Glasgow, and referred by them to the general assembly.

The latter body deposed him, and ordered him to be excommunicated, 11 December 1638. He was granted the opportunity to escape excommunication if he submitted unconditionally by 13 December, and when he failed to do so, the sentence was carried out. Owing to chronic illness, he was not able for some time to follow his fellow-bishops in flight to England, but in December 1640 he was in London "in great poverty and misery". He died at York, probably about the middle of 1644, and was buried at the expense of the governor of York.

== Notes ==
Religious titles
Preceded by David Lindsay	Bishop of Ross; 1613–1622	Succeeded by John Maxwell
Preceded by James Law	Archbishop of Glasgow; 1633–1638	Vacant Title next held by Andrew Fairfoul
