= William Irvine (bishop) =

Scottish college bishop

William Irvine was consecrated a college bishop (i.e., a bishop without a diocese), on 22 October 1718.
