= Andrew Cant (educator) =

Scottish clergy & scholar (c.1626–1685)

- Born: c.1626
- Died: 4 December 1685
- Spouse(s): Ann Burnet, Jean Cockburn, Anne Murray
- Children: 7
- Parent(s): Andrew Cant, Margaret Irvine

Academic background
- Education: Marischal College, Aberdeen

Andrew Cant (c.1626–1685) was a Scottish clergyman and scholar, and Principal of the University of Edinburgh from 1675 to 1685.

== Life ==
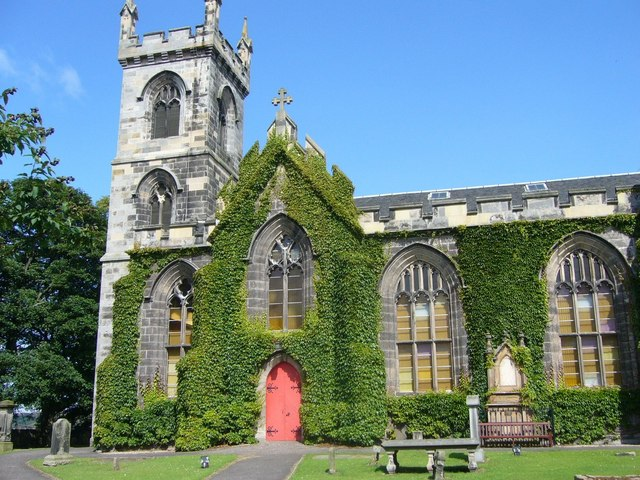
Liberton Kirk

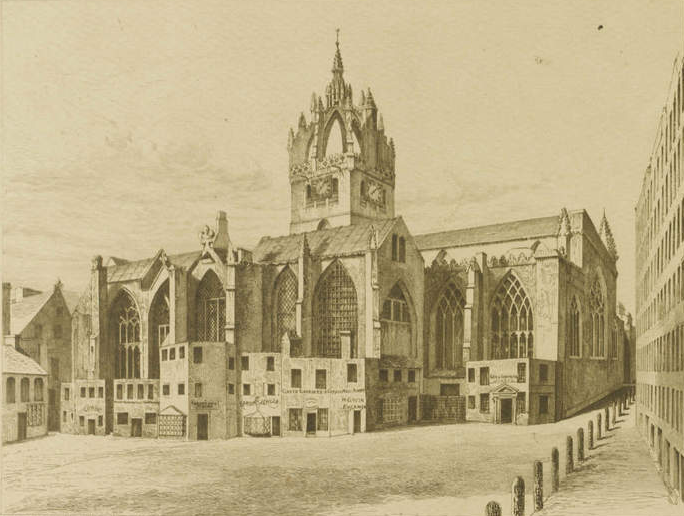
St Giles in the 17th century

He was born in Aberdeen the son of Andrew Cant (1584–1663). He graduated MA from Marischal College in Aberdeen in 1644. He served as Regent of the college from 1649 to 1658.

In March 1659 he was ordained as minister of Liberton Church just south of Edinburgh. After 14 years he was translated to Trinity Parish in Edinburgh in 1673, replacing Joshua Meldrum. In 1675 he was elected Principal of Edinburgh University. On 29 September 1675 the Town Council of Edinburgh appointed him "second charge" of St Giles Cathedral under William Annand.

As an Edinburgh minister during the reign of Charles II, and consequently is assumed to have been an adherent of Episcopacy.

He died on 4 December 1685.

== Publications ==
- Theses Philosophical
- De Libero Arbitrio
- Oratio de Concordia Theologorum et Discordia

== Family ==
He married three times:

Firstly in 1653 to Ann Burnet, daughter of Sir Thomas Burnet, 1st Baronet of Leys in Kincardineshire. Ann died in 1662. He secondly married Jean Cockburn in 1663. They had three daughters and three sons before she died in 1675.

He lastly married Anne Murray around 1678. She died in 1685 having one daughter, Agnes, in 1678.

His nephew Andrew Cant (d.1728) was deprived of his charge in Edinburgh, at the Revolution of 1689, and, on 17 October 1722 was consecrated as one of the bishops of the disestablished Episcopal Church in Scotland.

Academic offices
Preceded by William Colvill	Principals of the University of Edinburgh; 1675–1685	Succeeded by Alexander Monro
