= John Fullarton =

Scottish clergyman

The Right Reverend John Fullarton
- Bishop of Edinburgh; Primus of the Scottish Episcopal Church
- Church: Scottish Episcopal Church
- Elected: 1720
- In office: 1720–1727
- Predecessor: Alexander Rose
- Successor: Arthur Millar
- Other post: Primus of the Scottish Episcopal Church (1720-1727)

Orders
- Ordination: 1669
- Consecration: 25 January 1705 by John Paterson

Personal details
- Born: 1645
- Died: 27 April 1727 (aged 81–82) Auchenbreck Castle, Argyll and Bute, Scotland

John Fullarton (c.1645 – 1727), of Greenhall, Argyll, was a Scottish clergyman and nonjurant Episcopal Bishop of Edinburgh between 1720 and 1727.

== Origins ==
Fullarton was the son of James McCloy, alias Fullarton, of Ballochindryan and Jean Stewart, the daughter of John Stewart of Ascog. His grandfather is thought to have been Duncan, or Donald McCloy, minister at Kilmodan between at least 1609 and 1629, who was still alive as late as 1659, when he received a grant from the Synod of Argyll because of his poverty.

== Career ==
Fullarton obtained the degree of Master of Arts from Glasgow University in 1665. Following his ordination, he was minister at Kilmodan from 1669 to 1684 and at Paisley between 1684 and 1689, whence he was ejected at the Revolution. Robert Wodrow recorded in 1703 that Fullarton was present with other Episcopal clergy at a service in Glasgow to commemorate the execution of Charles I, and he also preached there. The connection with Paisley had not been broken, and Fullarton was at the deathbed of the young Lady Dundonald in Paisley in 1710, and later celebrated Holy Communion for the widowed Earl in Paisley Abbey, "the first instance of Communion at Yule so openly celebrated in this country," according to Wodrow. By 1712, Wodrow considered Fullarton to be "the man of that [Episcopalian] party in most repute in this country."

John Fullarton was consecrated a college bishop by the Archbishop of Glasgow, the Bishop of Edinburgh and Bishop of Dunblane on 25 January 1705 and was elected Bishop of Edinburgh and Primus in April 1720, with limited metropolitan powers, following the death of Dr Alexander Rose. He served as Bishop until his death on 27 April 1727 at his estate at Greenhall.

== Episcopate ==
Following his election, Fullarton appears to have made strong protestations of loyalty to the Old Pretender (in exile) and to have had numerous dealings with the Old Pretender's agent, George Lockhart. (According to Thomas Stephen: "The hope of the restoration of the old dynasty was strong in the minds of the bishops...”) The Scottish Magazine and Churchman's Review summed up Fullarton's episcopate in this way: “...he greatly exerted himself to accommodate the differences which existed among the clergy respecting usages, and endeavoured also to restore a proper distribution of Episcopal superintendence, for which, however, the state of the Church was not then ripe".

== Family ==
Fullarton married, first, Anna Haldane (who died 28 July 1679), secondly, Barbara Hamilton and, thirdly, Isobel Sinclair. His son by his second wife, John Fullarton of Greenhall, who did not long survive him, was a Surveyor of Customs.

== Sources ==
- David M. Bertie, Scottish Episcopal Clergy, 1689–2000 (Continuum International, 2000)
- Thomas Stephen, The History of the Church of Scotland: From the Reformation to the Present Time, Vol. IV (John Lendrum, London, 1845)
- The Scottish Magazine and Churchman's Review (R. Lendrum & Co, Edinburgh, 1849)
- Robert Wodrow, Analecta (1843); Correspondence (1842); Early Letters (1937)

== Notes ==
Religious titles
Preceded by Alexander Rose	Nonjuring Bishop of Edinburgh; 1720–1727	Succeeded by Arthur Millar
