= Alexander Rose (bishop) =

Scottish scholar, minister and bishop

The Right Reverend Alexander Rose
- Bishop of Edinburgh
- Church: Scottish Episcopal Church
- Diocese: Edinburgh
- In office: 1687–1720 (From 1689 as a bishop of the Scottish Episcopal Church)
- Predecessor: John Paterson
- Successor: John Fullarton
- Other post: Metropolitan of the Scottish Episcopal Church 1704–1720
- Previous posts: Bishop of Moray; Professor of Divinity, University of Glasgow; Principal of St Mary's College, St Andrews

Orders
- Consecration: 8 March 1687 by Arthur Rose

Personal details
- Born: 1645 or 1646 Scotland
- Died: 20 March 1720 Canongate, Edinburgh

Alexander Rose (1647–1720) was a Scottish scholar, minister and bishop. He was a Church of Scotland minister before becoming Professor of Divinity at the University of Glasgow and Principal of St Mary's College, St Andrews. He rose to become Bishop of Moray and then Bishop of Edinburgh. His failure to convince King William III and II that the Scottish bishops could be trusted led to the abolition of Episcopacy in Scotland. Rose continued as a nonjuring bishop, eventually becoming leader of the informal and embryonic Scottish Episcopal Church.

== Early life and career ==
Alexander was born in either 1645 or 1646, a year that can be calculated because we know that he was 74 years old at his death in March 1720. The Rose family originally came from Kilravock near Inverness. His father had been Prior of Monymusk. He entered the University of Aberdeen for a Master of Arts, but moved to the University of Glasgow to study divinity under Dr. Gilbert Burnet, later Bishop of Salisbury.

Rose was licensed to preach as a Church of Scotland minister by the Presbytery of Glasgow on 20 April 1670. He was ordained as "second Charge" minister of St John's Church in Perth in August 1672, but only after the town had unsuccessfully tried to secure the appointment of Alexander's uncle, Arthur Rose. He was promoted to "first charge" in 1678 in place of William Lindsay who had been chosen as Bishop of Dunkeld. In 1682 Alexander became Professor of Divinity at Glasgow, almost certainly with the help of his uncle, now Archbishop of Glasgow. On 22 October 1686 he got a royal presentation to be Principal of St Mary's College, St Andrews.

== Bishop of Moray and Edinburgh ==
Rose's career rise continued. In December of this year (1686), he was recommended by the king to be selected as the new Bishop of Moray. The royal mandate for his consecration was issued on 8 March 1687. However, before even taking possession of the diocese of Moray, he was translated to the diocese of Edinburgh, after his name had been put forward by Colin Lindsay, 3rd Earl of Balcarres. He was elected on 21 December, and despite the protests of some dissenting ministers, was appointed to the position on 31 December.

In December 1688, Bishop Rose and Bishop Andrew Bruce were chosen by the Scottish bishops to travel to London, but Bishop Bruce fell ill and Rose was compelled to continue alone. The situation he found himself in was having to decide on behalf of all the Scottish bishops whether to support William of Orange or James VII and II. William was prepared to retain Episcopacy in Scotland if the bishops would acknowledge him. Probably on 30 January 1689, Bishop Rose met with King William.

Bishop Rose was sympathetic to King James, and though William's cause had already clearly triumphed, he was not sure about committing the other Scottish bishops. When asked for his support, Bishop Rose gave a highly ambiguous reply:

Sir, I will serve you as far as law, reason, or conscience shall allow me.

Rose returned to Scotland without having committed either the bishops to King William, nor King William to the bishops. Later in the year, Rose was almost certainly one of the seven Scottish bishops who voted against renouncing their oaths to King James and offering the Scottish crown to William. This was probably enough to convince King William that the Scottish bishops were too sympathetic to Jacobitism, and there were more than enough hard-line Presbyterians in Scotland who hated the existence of bishops. It was thus that, on 20 July 1689, Episcopacy in Scotland was declared abolished and all bishops were deprived of their sees within the Church of Scotland.

== The nonjuring bishop and metropolitan ==
Rose continued to act as a nonjuring bishop, privately acknowledging the primacy of his uncle, now Archbishop of St Andrews. Though deprived of any formal authority, Rose gained informal influence over the embryonic Scottish Episcopal Church. After the death of Arthur Rose in 1704 and then John Paterson in 1708, Archbishop of Glasgow, Alexander Rose was regarded as the senior nonjuring bishop in Scotland. In 1705, along with Bishop Douglas of Dunblane, he performed the consecration of John Fullarton and John Sage. He consecrated five more bishops between 1709 and 1718.

Routinely suspected of Jacobitism, under severe pressure, and suffering declining number of sympathising ministers, Rose quietly led as the metropolitan of Scottish Episcopalians. He also tried to obtain the help of Church of England and Queen Anne. He was involved in the Jacobite rising of 1715, as a trustee of the "Old Pretender", James Francis Edward Stuart.

== Death and family ==
He died on 20 March 1720 of apoplexy, and was buried in the grounds of Restalrig church east of Edinburgh. He married Euphan Threipland, the daughter of Patrick Threipland of Fingask, the provost of Perth. Their son John Rose fought in the Jacobite Rebellion of 1715, and was captured at the battle of Sheriffmuir, though he obtained clemency partly due to his father's influence.

== Notes ==
Religious titles
Preceded by Colin Falconer	Bishop of Moray; 1687	Succeeded by William Hay
Preceded by John Paterson	Bishop of Edinburgh; 1687–1720 since 1689 nonjuring bishop	Succeeded by John Fullarton
