= Robert Douglas (bishop) =

Church of Scotland bishop

Robert Douglas (c.1630–1716) was a 17th and early 18th Church of Scotland minister who rose to be Protestant Bishop of Dunblane.

== Life ==
He was the son of Robert Douglas of Nether Kilmonth, and grandson of James Douglas of Glenbervie, both relatives of the Earls of Angus. He was educated at King's College, Aberdeen, graduating MA in 1647, before beginning life as a preacher around 1650. He became the minister of Laurencekirk in the Mearns in January 1657, then Bothwell in 1665 and Renfrew in 1669. After the Restoration, King Charles II presented him to the parsonage of Hamilton, a position which came with the deanery of Glasgow.

In 1682 he became Bishop of Brechin, holding that bishopric for two years before being translated to the Bishop of Dunblane in August 1684. Douglas was Bishop of Dunblane until the abolition of Episcopacy in Scotland following the Revolution which then deprived Douglas and all other Scottish bishops of their sees. He died on 22 April 1716 in Dundee, at "the uncommon age of 92".

== Family ==
He married twice. Firstly to Miss Irvine of Drum, by whom he had Rev Robert Douglas, minister of Bothwell. He next married Elizabeth Lammy daughter of Rev Sylvester Lammy of Glamis. Their children included:

- Sylvester Douglas of Whiteriggs in the Mearns
- William Douglas (1666–1746), later became Provost of Forfar
- George
- James
- Katherine, married Dr George Reid of Dundee
- Susanna, married Charles White of Dundee
- A daughter, married Provost Dean of Forfar

== Notes ==
Religious titles
Preceded by George Haliburton	Bishop of Brechin; 1682–1684	Succeeded by Alexander Cairncross
Preceded by James Ramsay	Bishop of Dunblane; 1684–1689	Episcopacy abolished
