= Scottish Episcopal Church =

Christian church in Scotland

- Logo of the Scottish Episcopal Church, depicting a mitre and two crosiers
- Classification: Protestant
- Orientation: Anglican (Note: Broad church (including variations of high church and low church))
- Scripture: Holy Bible
- Theology: Anglican doctrine (Note: With various theological and doctrinal identities, including Anglo-Catholic, Liberal and Evangelical)
- Polity: Episcopal
- Primus: Mark Strange
- Associations: World Council of Churches; Anglican Communion; Porvoo Communion; Action of Churches Together in Scotland
- Region: Scotland
- Headquarters: Edinburgh, Scotland
- Origin: Concordat of Leith 1572, Scottish Episcopalians Act 1711
- Branched from: Institutionally: Catholic Church and Church of Scotland; Theologically: Church of England
- Congregations: 275
- Members: 22,990 (2024)
- Active clergy: 370 (2010)
- Official website: scotland.anglican.org
- Slogan: "Evangelical Truth and Apostolic Order"

The Scottish Episcopal Church (Scots: Scots Episcopal Kirk; (Note: Attested quite variedly in each word in writings and speech according to subdialect (from identical to Standard English to notable "corrupt[ed] forms"), such as Scottis Episcopawl(ian) Kirk, Episcopaulian Church, Esculopian, Episcopian, etc.) Scottish Gaelic: Eaglais Easbaigeach na h-Alba) is a Christian denomination in Scotland. Scotland's third largest church, the Scottish Episcopal Church has 275 local congregations. It is also an ecclesiastical province of the Anglican Communion.

A continuation of the episcopalian "Church of Scotland" as intended by James VI, and as it was from the Restoration of Charles II to the re-establishment of Presbyterianism in Scotland following the Glorious Revolution, it recognises the archbishop of Canterbury of the Church of England as president of the Anglican Instruments of Communion, but without jurisdiction in Scotland per se. Additionally, while the British monarch holds the title of Supreme Governor of the Church of England, in Scotland the monarch maintains private links to both the Presbyterian Church of Scotland and the Scottish Episcopal Church, though in Scotland they attend and are a member (but not the leader) of the former. The church is led by a Primus, who is elected from the seven Bishops of the Scottish Episcopal Church from among their number to serve as a primus inter pares or 'first among equals' as the Senior Bishop. The primus of the Scottish Episcopal Church, elected in 2017, is Mark Strange.

In terms of official membership, Episcopalians constitute under 1 per cent of the population of Scotland, making them considerably smaller than the Church of Scotland or the Catholic Church in Scotland. In 2011, 0.9% of the population, or 103,017 people, identified as Anglicans or Episcopalians. In the 2022 census, 72,359 people identified as Anglicans or Episcopalians in Scotland. The membership of the church in 2024 was 22,990, of which 16,124 were communicant members. The attendance at Sunday worship, as counted on Sunday next before Advent was 8,710. This compares with the figures from six years previously, in 2017, where church membership had been 30,909, of whom 22,073 were communicant members, and there was a Sunday worship attendance of 12,149.

== Official name ==
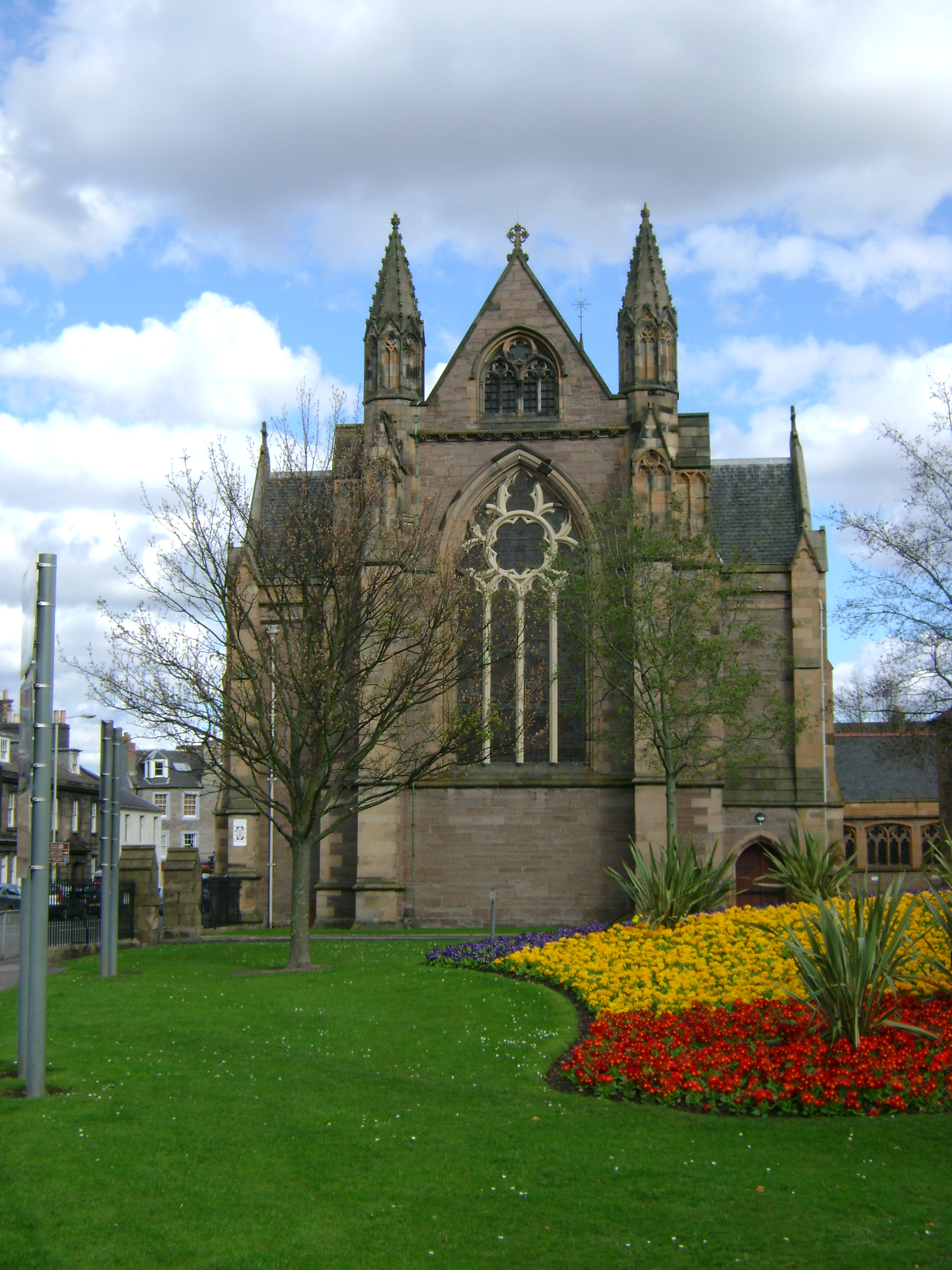
St Ninian's Cathedral, Perth

The Scottish Episcopal Church was previously called the Protestant Episcopal Church in Scotland, simplified at the General Synod of 1838 to Episcopal Church in Scotland.

Although not incorporated until 1712, the Scottish Episcopal Church traces its origins including but extending beyond the Reformation and sees itself in continuity with the church established by Ninian, Columba, Kentigern, and other Celtic saints. The Church of Scotland and the Catholic church claim the same continuity.

The church is sometimes pejoratively referred to in Scotland as the "English Kirk", but this can cause offence. This is probably in part due to the fact that it is, nonetheless, a union of the non-juring Episcopalians with the "qualified congregations" who worshipped according to the liturgy of the Church of England. It is also sometimes known as the "Laird's Kirk" because of its historical associations with the landed aristocracy of Scotland whose membership of the church exceeded that of other denominations. In the mid-1800s it was recorded that three quarters of the "landed proprietors of Scotland" were Episcopalians.

== History ==
=== Origins of Christianity in Scotland ===
The fifth-century Saint Ninian conducted the first Christian mission to what is now southern Scotland.

In 563 AD, Saint Columba travelled to Scotland with twelve companions, where according to legend he first landed at the southern tip of the Kintyre peninsula, near Southend. However, being still in sight of his native land he moved further north along the west coast of Scotland. He was granted land on the island of Iona off the Isle of Mull which became the centre of his evangelising mission to the Picts. However, there is a sense in which he did not leave his native people, as the Irish Gaels had been colonising the west coast of Scotland for some time.

The Scottish Catholic Church would continue to grow in the centuries that followed, and in the 11th century Saint Margaret of Scotland (Queen Consort of Malcolm III of Scotland) strengthened the church's ties with the Holy See, as did successive monarchs such as Margaret's son, David, who invited several religious orders to establish monasteries.

=== Reformation ===
The Scottish Reformation was formalised in 1560, when the Church of Scotland broke with the Church of Rome during a process of Protestant reform led, among others, by John Knox. It reformed its doctrines and government, drawing on the principles of John Calvin which Knox had been exposed to while living in Switzerland. In 1560, the Scottish Parliament abolished papal jurisdiction and approved Calvin's Confession of Faith, but did not accept many of the principles laid out in Knox's First Book of Discipline, which argued, among other things, that all of the assets of the old church should pass to the new. The 1560 Reformation Settlement was not ratified by the crown for some years, and the question of church government also remained largely unresolved. In 1572 the acts of 1560 were finally approved by the young James VI, but under pressure from many of the nobles the Concordat of Leith also allowed the crown to appoint bishops with the church's approval. John Knox himself had no clear views on the office of bishop, preferring to see them renamed as "superintendents"; but in response to the new Concordat a Presbyterian party emerged headed by Andrew Melville, the author of the Second Book of Discipline.

The Scottish Episcopal Church began as a distinct church in 1582, when the Church of Scotland rejected episcopal government (by bishops) and adopted a presbyterian government by elders as well as reformed theology. Scottish monarchs made repeated efforts to introduce bishops and two ecclesiastical traditions competed.

=== Episcopal government imposed by the Stuarts ===
Timeline of the development of Scottish churches since 1560

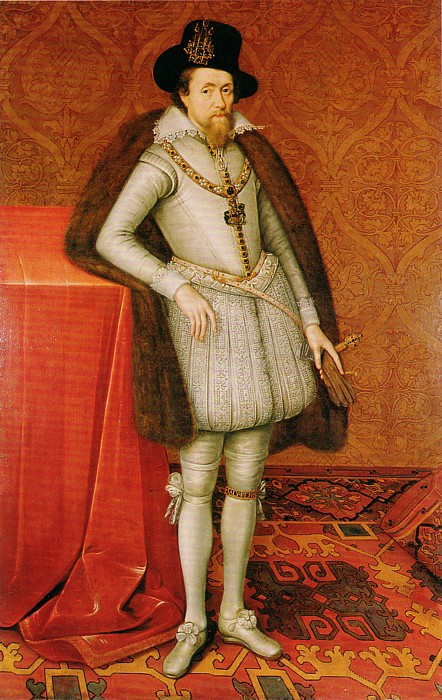
Portrait of James VI by John de Critz, c. 1606

In 1584, James VI of Scotland had the Parliament of Scotland pass the Black Acts, appointing two bishops and administering the Church of Scotland under direct royal control. This met vigorous opposition and he was forced to concede that the General Assembly should continue to run the church. Calvinists who disliked the more ceremonious style of liturgy were opposed by an Episcopalian faction. After ascending to the English throne in 1603 James stopped the General Assembly from meeting, increased the number of Scottish bishops and in 1618 held a General Assembly in Perth; this gathering adopted Five Articles of Episcopalian practices. Many Scottish church leaders, and their congregations, responded to the Five Articles with boycotts and disdain.

James's son Charles I was crowned in Holyrood Abbey, Edinburgh, in 1633 with full Anglican rites. Subsequently, in 1637, Charles attempted to introduce a Scottish version of the Book of Common Prayer, written by a group of Scottish prelates, most notably the Archbishop of St Andrews, John Spottiswoode, and the Bishop of Ross, John Maxwell, and edited for printing by the Archbishop of Canterbury, William Laud; it was a combination of Knox's Book of Common Order, which was in use before 1637, and English liturgy in hopes of further unifying the (Anglican) Church of England and the (Presbyterian) Church of Scotland. When the revised Book of Common Prayer was used for the first time during worship on 23 July 1637 in St Giles' Edinburgh, it sparked a riot which was so representative of the strength of popular feeling in Scotland that it indirectly precipitated the Bishops' Wars and this successful challenge of royal authority helped encourage many unhappy Irish Catholics into partaking in the Irish Rebellion of 1641 and the already increasingly uncooperative English Parliament into likewise declaring war on the king in the English Civil War. As a result of the weakness of the king, Presbyterian Covenanters were able to become the de facto government in Scotland until disagreement between the Scottish and English Parliaments over how to run Britain in terms of both civil and religious governance after the king was defeated led to another war and Scotland's conquest by the Covenanters' erstwhile allies the English Parliament's New Model Army.

Following the Restoration of the monarch in 1660, the government of Charles II reimposed episcopacy, and required all clergymen to swear allegiance to the king and bishops and renounce the Covenants, or be prevented from preaching in church. Up to a third, at least 27%, of the ministry refused, mostly in the south-west of Scotland, and numerous ministers also took to preaching in the open fields in conventicles across the south of Scotland, often attracting thousands of worshippers. This was forcibly repressed by the government, in actions later dubbed The Killing Time. The conflict continued under King James VII of Scotland (also James II of England) until the Glorious Revolution led to his removal from power.

With the 1689 refusal of the Scottish bishops to swear allegiance to William of Orange whilst James VII lived and had not abdicated, the Presbyterian polity was finally re-established in the Church of Scotland. However, the Confession of Faith Ratification Act 1690 (April c. 7) allowed Episcopalian incumbents, upon taking the Oath of Allegiance, to retain their benefices, though excluding them from any share in the government of the Church of Scotland without a further declaration of Presbyterian principles. Many "non-jurors" also succeeded for a time in retaining the use of the parish churches.

The excluded Scottish bishops were slow to organise the Episcopalian remnant under a jurisdiction independent of the state, regarding the then arrangements as provisional, and looking forward to a reconstituted national Episcopal Church under a sovereign they regarded as legitimate (see Jacobitism). A few prelates, known as college bishops, were consecrated without sees, to preserve the succession rather than to exercise a defined authority. At length the hopelessness of the Stuart cause and the growth of congregations outside the establishment forced the bishops to dissociate canonical jurisdiction from royal prerogative and to reconstitute for themselves a territorial episcopate.

The Scottish Book of Common Prayer came into general use at start of the reign of William and Mary. The Scottish Communion Office, compiled by the non-jurors in accordance with primitive models, has had a varying co-ordinate authority, and the modifications of the English liturgy that would be adopted by the American Church were mainly determined by its influence.

Among the clergy of post-Revolution days the most eminent are Bishop John Sage, a well-known patristic scholar; Bishop Rattray, liturgiologist; John Skinner, of Longside, author of Tullochgorum; Bishop Gleig, editor of the 3rd edition of the Encyclopædia Britannica; Dean Ramsay, author of Reminiscences of Scottish Life and Character; Bishop A. P. Forbes; G. H. Forbes, liturgiologist; and Bishop Charles Wordsworth. Bishop James Sharp, a former moderate Covenanter and Resolutioner, was appointed Archbishop of St Andrews and primate of Scotland in 1661. He was reviled by Covenanters, and his murder in 1679 led to an escalation of hostilities.

=== From the Union of England and Scotland in 1707 ===
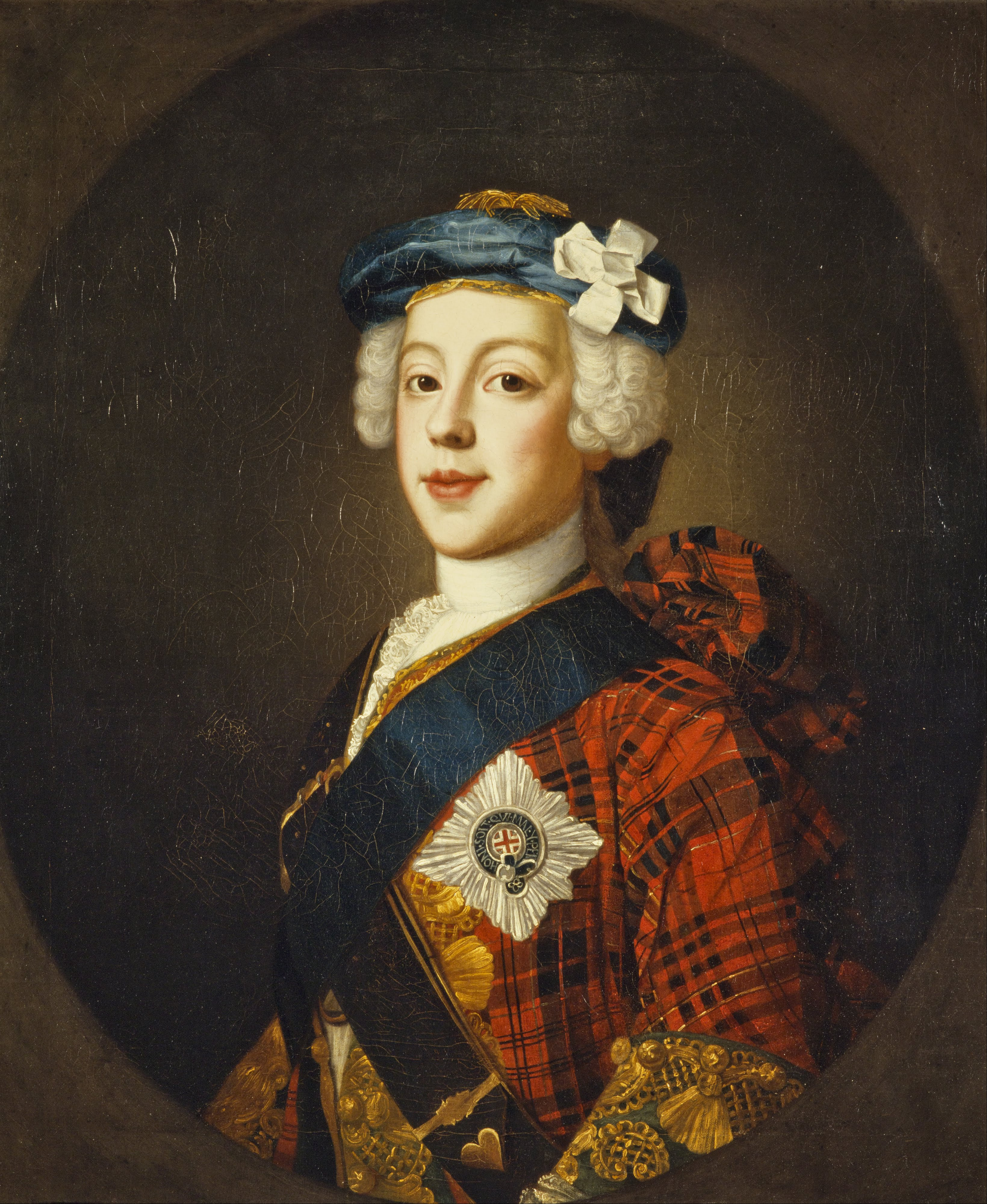
The death of Charles Edward Stuart ('Bonnie Prince Charlie') led to better conditions for church growth.

In 1707 Scotland and England were merged into a single Kingdom of Great Britain. The Scottish Episcopalians Act 1711 protected the Episcopal Church, which marked its virtual incorporation as a distinct society. However, matters were still complicated by a considerable, though declining, number of Episcopalian incumbents holding parish churches. Moreover, the Jacobitism of the non-jurors provoked a state policy of repression in 1715 and 1745, and fostered the growth of new Hanoverian congregations, using the English Prayer Book (served by clergy who had been ordained by a bishop but amenable to none), who qualified themselves under the 1711 act. This act was further modified in 1746 and 1748 to exclude clergy ordained in Scotland.

These causes reduced the Episcopalians, who in 1689 had been a large section of the population, to a minority, save in a few corners of the west and north-east of Scotland. Their official recognition of George III, on the death of Charles Edward Stuart in 1788, removed the chief bar to progress. In 1792 the penal laws were repealed, but clerical disabilities were only finally removed in 1864. The Qualified Chapels were gradually absorbed in the early 19th century.

After the independence of the Thirteen Colonies, the Scottish Episcopal Church also took the step of consecrating Samuel Seabury at Aberdeen in 1784. He became the first bishop of the American Episcopal Church after being refused consecration by Church of England clergy. In this way, it can be said that the Episcopal Church in the United States owes as much of its origins to the Scottish Episcopal Church as to the Church of England.

The Theological College was founded in 1810, incorporated with Trinity College, Glenalmond, in 1848, and re-established at Edinburgh in 1876. Theological training is now provided by the various dioceses and is supervised by Scottish Episcopal Institute (formerly, the Theological Institute of the Scottish Episcopal Church).

In 1900 the church had 356 congregations, with a total membership of 124,335 and 324 working clergy. Membership did not grow in the following decades as it was believed it would.

In 1989 there were approximately 200 stipendiary and 80 non-stipendiary clergy. Membership was 65,000, with 31,000 communicants.

In 1995, the Scottish Episcopal Church began working through a process known as Mission 21. Canon Alice Mann of the Alban Institute was invited to begin developing a missionary emphasis within the congregations of the church throughout Scotland. This led to the development of the Making Your Church More Inviting programme which has now been completed by many congregations. In addition to working on making churches more inviting, Mission 21 emphasises reaching out to new populations which have previously not been contacted by the church. As Mission 21 has developed, changing patterns of ministry have become part of its remit.

In 1633 Charles I remodelled Holyrood Abbey as a Chapel Royal, and held his coronation there with full Episcopalian rites. In this year he also founded the See of Edinburgh and appointed William Forbes as first Bishop of Edinburgh in the following year. He also appointed John Guthrie, Bishop of Moray as the first, and last, Episcopalian Royal Almoner of Scotland. The Abbey was lost to its Protestant congregation as part of the events of the Glorious Revolution and eventually ruined. The Lord Bishop of Edinburgh and Anglican congregation were also evicted from St Giles' Cathedral following the Prayer Book riots in 1637. The office of Royal Almoner was made largely honorific then effectively secular, and by 1835 had merged into the responsibilities of the King's and Lord Treasurer's Remembrancer. The headquarters (the Scottish Episcopal Church General Synod Office) of the Scottish Episcopal Church as of 2022 is Forbes House, number 21 Grosvenor Crescent in the West End of Edinburgh.

The primus does not have any metropolitan jurisdiction. Metropolitan responsibilities are held by the diocesan bishops. The last head of the Scottish Episcopal Church to hold both primate and metropolitan titles was Arthur Rose, Archbishop of St Andrews, up to his death in 1704. The last bishop to exercise metropolitan authority was Alexander Rose, Bishop of Edinburgh, up to his death in 1720.

=== 21st century ===
The official number of Episcopalians constitutes well under 1 per cent of the population of Scotland, making them considerably smaller than the Church of Scotland. In 2012 the church had 310 parishes with an adult membership of 34,916 and communicant numbers some 10,000 fewer at 24,650. As with other churches in Scotland, attendance has declined over recent years: the overall figures reflect rises in some dioceses and decline in others, but amount to an overall fall in attendance of 15 per cent between 2007 and 2012. The church's 2016 annual report noted a "continuing decline in overall numbers", with a reduction down to 303 congregations and in almost identical language it was reported in 2018 that the church faced "continuing decline in members and attendance". By the end of 2020 numbers had fallen further to 27,600 (membership) and 19,800 (communicants). No accurate attendance figures could be produced due to the legal restrictions on church attendance introduced in response to COVID-19. By 2021 membership had fallen by a further 32% from 2012 levels, to just over 24,000.

Modelling suggests that if the rate of decline in membership continues as it has since the 1920s, the Scottish Episcopal Church will be extinct by around 2045. However, the denomination may survive beyond that date, due to a small number of more vibrant congregations. In the 2024 statistics, 11 SEC congregations, out of 275, had over 100 people in regular attendance. Meanwhile, 49 congregations recorded 10 or fewer in attendance. The average congregation size was 35.

At the close of 2024, the denomination had 275 congregations. The statistics for the denomination, by their dioceses were as follows:

Statistics for Scottish Episcopal Church - Dec 2024
Diocese	Number of Congregations	Membership	Communicant Numbers	Total Attendance
Aberdeen and Orkney	36	2,206	1,577	752
Argyll and The Isles	22	843	608	325
Brechin	24	1,366	1,036	517
Edinburgh	53	8,459	5,599	3,452
Glasgow and Galloway	53	3,823	3,012	1,633
Moray, Ross and Caithness	40	2,977	1,929	644
St Andrews, Dunkeld and Dunblane	47	3,316	2,363	1,387
TOTAL	275	22,990	16,124	8,710

In recent decades, the Scottish Episcopal Church has taken a left-of-centre stance on various political issues including economic justice and the ordination of women. A church canon was altered to allow same-sex marriage after it was formally approved by the General Synod in June 2017, making it the first major Christian church in the UK to allow same-sex marriages. The change was approved by six of the Church's seven dioceses, with only Aberdeen and Orkney voting against the proposal.

Following the vote, a number of individual congregations began to leave the church, although they have been obliged to leave their buildings and funds behind them. In November 2017 a high-profile female supporter of same-sex marriage, Anne Dyer was appointed Bishop of the theologically traditionalist Diocese of Aberdeen and Orkney by the other bishops, rather than elected as usual. (This was because the diocese had twice been unable to produce the minimum number of candidates for an election.) Although the appointment drew protests, which the primus attacked as "subversion", Dyer was nevertheless consecrated in March 2018. A number of clergy subsequently resigned, and in January 2019 the Westhill Community Church in Aberdeen voted to leave the SEC.

The Scottish Episcopal Institute, a theological college for the whole of the Scottish Episcopal Church, was founded in 2015. It provides training for both lay ministers and ordained clergy.

== Structure ==
=== Bishops and Primus ===
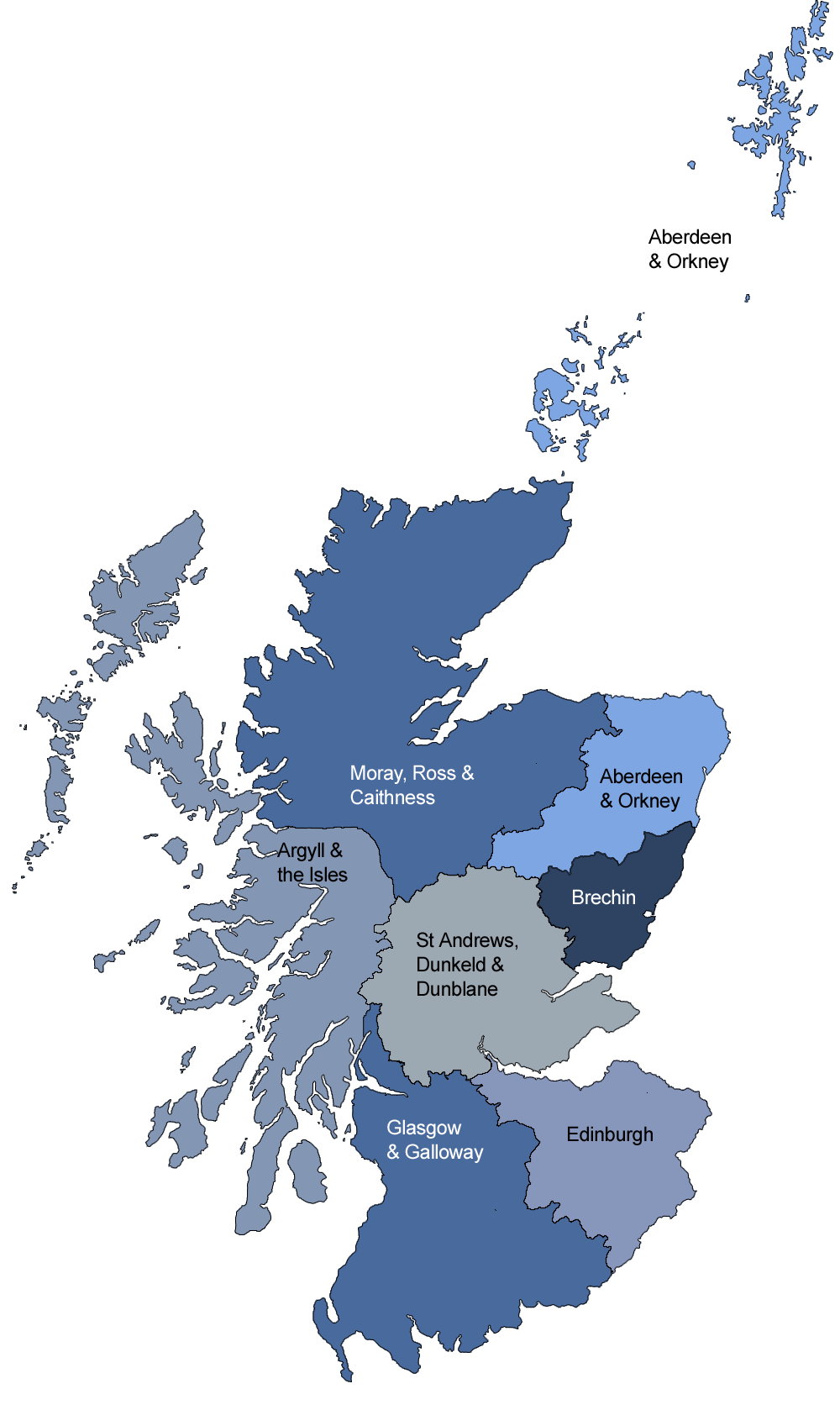
Map of the dioceses of the Scottish Episcopal Church

As an episcopal denomination, the church is governed by bishops, differentiating it from the national Church of Scotland which is presbyterian and governed by elders. However, unlike the Church of England, the bishops of the Scottish Episcopal Church are elected in a procedure involving clergy and laity of the vacant diocese voting at an electoral synod.

The church is composed of seven dioceses, each with its own bishop:

Diocese	Present bishop
Diocese of Aberdeen and Orkney	Anne Dyer (consecrated 1 March 2018)
Diocese of Argyll and The Isles	David Railton (consecrated 28 August 2024)
Diocese of Brechin	Andrew Swift (consecrated 25 August 2018)
Diocese of Edinburgh	Dagmar Winter (translated 30 May 2026) (Note: Consecrated as Bishop of Huntingdon in the diocese of Ely in the Church of England on 3 July 2019.)
Diocese of Glasgow and Galloway	Nicholas Bundock (consecrated 4 May 2025)
Diocese of Moray, Ross and Caithness	Mark Strange (consecrated 13 October 2007)
Diocese of St Andrews, Dunkeld and Dunblane	Ian Paton (consecrated 20 October 2018)

All sees stem from sees of the Catholic Church in Scotland, except Edinburgh which was founded by Charles I. The bishops of the Episcopal Church are direct successors of the prelates consecrated to Scottish sees at the Restoration. The bishops are addressed Right Reverend.

The College of Bishops constitutes the episcopal synod, the supreme court of appeal.

The Primus of the Scottish Episcopal Church is the presiding bishop of the church, elected by the episcopal synod from among its members. The title originates from the Latin phrase Primus inter pares – 'First among equals'. Their duties are:

- to preside at all Provincial Liturgical Functions
- to preside at all meetings of the General Synod of the Scottish Episcopal Church
- to preside at all meetings of the Episcopal Synod
- to declare and carry out the resolutions of the General Synod, the Episcopal Synod and the College of Bishops
- to represent the Scottish Episcopal Church in its relation to all other Churches of the Anglican Communion and other Communions
- to perform the functions and duties of Primus as specified in the Canons of the Scottish Episcopal Church
- to correspond on behalf of the Scottish Episcopal Church with Primates, Metropolitans and the Secretary General of the Anglican Consultative Council.

The incumbent is Mark Strange, who was elected on 27 June 2017.

The Primus does not have any metropolitan jurisdiction—the last to hold such jurisdiction was Archbishop Arthur Rose (of St Andrews) up to his death in 1704. The Primus is addressed Most Reverend.

=== Representative bodies ===
The church is governed by the General Synod. This consists of the House of Bishops, the House of Clergy and the House of Laity. The General Synod makes canon law, administers finance and monitors the work of the boards and committees of the Church. Most decisions are arrived at by a simple majority of members of the General Synod voting together. More complex legislation, such as changes to the Code of Canons requires each of the Houses to agree and to vote in favour by a two-thirds majority.

Each diocese has its synod of the clergy and laity. Its dean (similar to an archdeacon in the Church of England) is appointed by the bishop, and, on the voidance of the see, summons the diocesan synod, at the instance of the primus, to choose a bishop. Each diocese has one or more (in the case of some united dioceses) cathedrals. The senior priest of a Scottish Episcopal cathedral is styled as provost (as the title of "dean" is given to the senior priest of the diocese as a whole, see above). The only exception in Scotland is the Cathedral of the Isles on the island of Great Cumbrae which has been led by a member of the clergy styled as Precentor. Diocesan deans and cathedral provosts are both addressed as Very Reverend.

== Worship and liturgy ==
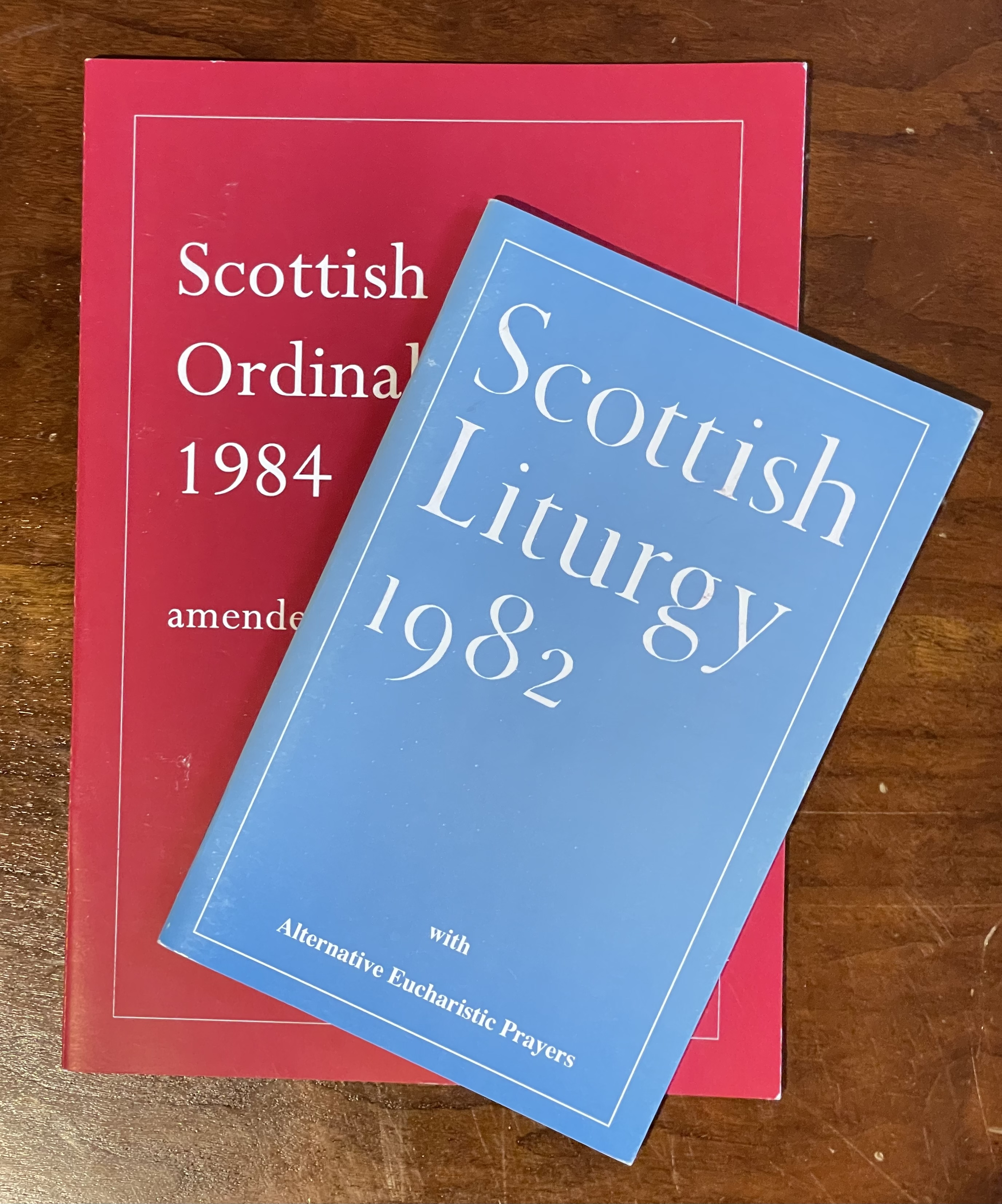
The Scottish Liturgy 1982 and 2006 edition of the Scottish Ordinal 1984

The Scottish Episcopal Church is mainly in the High Church (or Anglo-Catholic) tradition.

It embraces three orders of ministry: deacon, priest (referred to in the Scottish Prayer Book as presbyter) and bishop. Increasingly, an emphasis is being placed on these orders to work collaboratively within the wider ministry of the whole people of God.

=== Liturgies ===
In addition to the Scottish Prayer Book of 1929, the church has a number of other liturgies available to it. In recent years, revised Funeral Rites have appeared, along with liturgies for Christian Initiation (e.g. Baptism and Affirmation) and Marriage. The modern Eucharistic rite (Scottish Liturgy 1982) includes Eucharistic prayers for the various seasons in the Liturgical Year and is commonly known as "The Blue Book", a reference to the colour of its covers. A further Eucharistic prayer is provided in the Marriage liturgy.

== Doctrine and practice ==
This balance of scripture, tradition and reason is traced to the work of Richard Hooker, a sixteenth-century apologist. In Hooker's model, scripture is the primary means of arriving at doctrine and things stated plainly in scripture are accepted as true. Issues that are ambiguous are determined by tradition, which is checked by reason.

=== Social issues ===
The Scottish Episcopal Church has been involved in Scottish politics.

The church was one of the parties involved in the Scottish Constitutional Convention, which laid the groundwork for the creation of the devolved Scottish Parliament in 1999. Canon Kenyon Wright of the Episcopal Church chaired the convention (1989–1999).

The church actively supports the work of the Scottish Churches Parliamentary Office in Edinburgh and the Society, Religion and Technology Project.

All orders of ministry are open to both male and female candidates. On 9 November 2017, the first woman, Anne Dyer, was elected bishop in the Episcopal Church in Scotland. She was consecrated as Bishop of Aberdeen and Orkney in March 2018.

In the area of human sexuality, a debate continued for many years as to the propriety of fully permitting the presence of non-celibate lesbian and gay church members (there never having been a prohibition on membership or ordination of celibate homosexuals). In 2000, a former primate called for the church to bless same-sex couples. Clergy became able to enter into a same-sex civil partnership in 2005, and the church does not require sexual abstinence of such civil unions. Since 2008, St Mary's Cathedral, Glasgow has offered blessings for civil partnerships. In 2015 the General Synod passed a vote which led to the first stage of approval formal blessings of same-sex marriage. A number of congregations have hosted the blessings of same-sex couples including St Mary's Cathedral, Glasgow and St Paul's Cathedral, Dundee.

In 2016, the General Synod voted in favour of changing the canon of marriage to include same-sex couples. The change was formally approved by the church in June 2017. As a result, at the Anglican Communion primates' meeting in October 2017 the Scottish Episcopal Church was suspended for three years from communion "decision making on any issues of doctrine or polity", a mirror of the sanction applied to the U.S. Episcopal Church in 2016 for the same reason.

=== Ecumenical relations ===
Like many other Anglican churches, the Scottish Episcopal Church has entered into full communion with the Old Catholics of the Union of Utrecht. The Scottish Episcopal Church is also a member of the Porvoo Communion and is a member of several ecumenical bodies, including Action of Churches Together in Scotland and the World Council of Churches.

In December 2009, there were reports that certain High Church traditionalists within the Scottish Episcopal Church were in favour of joining the Roman Catholic Church.

In September 2025, the Scottish Episcopal Church and the Catholic Church in Scotland signed the St Ninian Declaration, an historic declaration of friendship between the two churches, during a service of evensong at St Mary's Cathedral, Edinburgh (Episcopal).

== Relation with the Anglican realignment ==
Conservative members have organised in the Scottish Anglican Network and are associated with the Global Anglican Future Conference (GAFCON). The Scottish Anglican Network announced on 8 June 2017, the same day that the SEC voted to approve same-sex marriage, that they would be in "impaired communion" with the denomination, due to this decision. The General Synod of the Anglican Church of Australia passed a motion on 7 September 2017, condemning SEC's decision to approve same-sex marriage as "contrary to the doctrine of our church and the teaching of Christ", and declaring itself in "impaired communion" with the province. It also expressed their "support for those Anglicans who have left or will need to leave the Scottish Episcopal Church because of its redefinition of marriage and those who struggle and remain", and presented their prayers for the return of SEC "to the doctrine of Christ in this matter and that impaired relationships will be restored." The Global South Primates expressed their support for the Scottish Anglican Network on 9 September 2017.

Nine churches have left the Primates since 2011, largely over the issue of the approval of same-sex marriage within the denomination. Five joined Presbyterian churches, and four joined GAFCON through the Anglican Church in North America, namely:

- Christ Church, Harris (departed 2017)
- St Thomas's, Corstorphine (departed 2018)
- Westhill Community Church, Aberdeenshire (departed 2019)
- St Silas, Glasgow (departed 2019)

== See also ==
- Bishop of Argyll and The Isles
- List of Scottish Episcopal churches
- Religion in Scotland
