= List of listed buildings in Strachan, Aberdeenshire =

This is a list of listed buildings in the parish of Strachan in Aberdeenshire, Scotland.

== List ==
Name	Location	Date Listed	Grid Ref. (Note: Sometimes known as OSGB36, the grid reference (where provided) is based on the British national grid reference system used by the Ordnance Survey. • "Guide to National Grid". Ordnance Survey. • "Get-a-map". Ordnance Survey.)	Geo-coordinates	Notes	LB Number (Note: Historic Environment Scotland assign a unique alphanumeric identifier to each designated site in Scotland, for listed buildings this always begins with "LB", for example "LB12345".)	Image
Mains Of Blackhall				57°03′09″N 2°32′25″W	Category C(S)	16218	Upload Photo
Mill Of Camnie Bridge Over Cammie Burn				57°01′07″N 2°30′47″W	Category C(S)	16219	Upload Photo
Knockhill - Lime Kiln				57°00′52″N 2°29′23″W	Category C(S)	16220	Upload Photo
General Burnett's Monument, Scolty Hill				57°02′08″N 2°31′52″W	Category B	16217	Upload another image See more images
Bridge Of Dye Over Water Of Dye				56°57′53″N 2°34′32″W	Category A	13878	Upload Photo
Bridge Of Dye, Old Lodge Including Ancillary Buildings				56°57′52″N 2°34′35″W	Category B	16222	Upload Photo
Invery House				57°02′09″N 2°29′59″W	Category B	16224	Upload Photo
Parish Kirk Manse, Now House Of Strachan				57°01′12″N 2°32′22″W	Category C(S)	16216	Upload Photo
Bridge Of Bogendreep Over Water Of Dye				57°00′33″N 2°33′26″W	Category B	16221	Upload another image
Spitalburn Bridge Over Spital Burn				56°57′03″N 2°34′52″W	Category B	16223	Upload Photo
Strachan Parish Kirk				57°01′15″N 2°32′18″W	Category C(S)	16215	Upload another image

== Key ==
The scheme for classifying buildings in Scotland is:

- Category A: "buildings of national or international importance, either architectural or historic; or fine, little-altered examples of some particular period, style or building type."
- Category B: "buildings of regional or more than local importance; or major examples of some particular period, style or building type, which may have been altered."
- Category C: "buildings of local importance; lesser examples of any period, style, or building type, as originally constructed or moderately altered; and simple traditional buildings which group well with other listed buildings."

In March 2016 there were 47,288 listed buildings in Scotland. Of these, 8% were Category A, and 50% were Category B, with the remaining 42% being Category C.

== See also ==
- List of listed buildings in Aberdeenshire
