= Elizabeth Kinniburgh =

Scottish ordained female minister

Reverend Elizabeth Kinniburgh
- Born: Elizabeth Baxter Forbes Kinniburgh; 1 May 1929; Greenock, Scotland
- Died: October 23, 2016 (aged 87); Aboyne, Scotland
- Education: University of Edinburgh
- Occupation: Church of Scotland minister
- Known for: One of the first women to be ordained by the Church of Scotland

Reverend Elizabeth (Betty) Baxter Forbes Kinniburgh (1 May 1929 – 23 October 2016) was one of the first women to gain the license to preach in 1969 and became ordained as a minister for the Church of Scotland in 1970.

== Life ==
Elizabeth Kinniburgh (who preferred the name Betty) was born in Greenock, Scotland.

=== Education and early work ===
She attended Greenock Academy, until her family moved to Edinburgh during World War II. At Trinity Academy, she was described as a brilliant scholar. She went on to earn a Master of Arts degree at Edinburgh University and then a Diploma in Education at Moray House at the same university.

Kinniburgh worked as a school teacher at the Aberlady Public School in East Lothian, but gave up teaching to pursue biblical studies and a Bachelor of Divinity course at New College and continued post graduate research in Cambridge publishing Religious Education - An Attempt at a Theological Appraisal in the Scottish Journal of Theology. She continued teaching religious topics in her position at the University of St. Andrews and later at Dundee's College of Education.

=== Work in the Church of Scotland ===
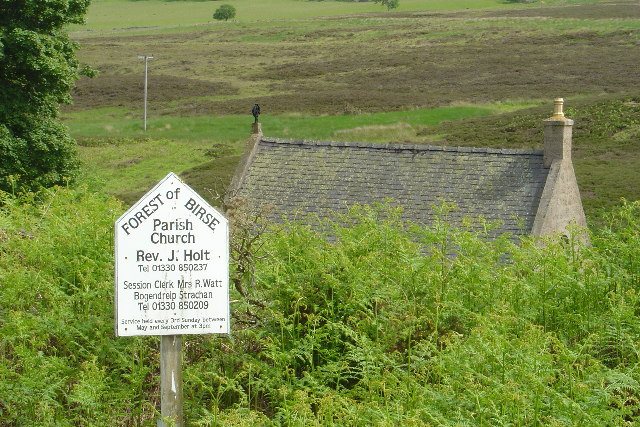
Minister of Birse parish church

Kinniburgh became one of the first women with the license to preach in 1969 while she was lecturing in religious studies in Dundee followed by full ordination to minister in 1970 after the Church of Scotland began allowing the ordination of women in 1968. She was accepted as minister and Moderator of the Presbytery in the parish of Birse, which was linked with the communities of Finzean and Strachan in 1983.

Kinniburgh was acting as Moderator of the Presbytery and running three kirk sessions and three Sunday schools when she suffered a severe stroke in 1986 which left her in a coma for six weeks. She made only a partial recovery from the incident and had to retire from ministry to a small house in Aboyne. She lived there the rest of her days and died 23 October 2016.

== See also ==
- Ordination of women in the Church of Scotland
