= Birse =

Coordinates: 57.06°N 02.74°W

- Location within Aberdeenshire
- OS grid reference: NO5597
- Council area: Aberdeenshire
- Lieutenancy area: Aberdeenshire
- Country: Scotland
- Sovereign state: United Kingdom
- Police: Scotland
- Fire: Scottish
- Ambulance: Scottish
- UK Parliament: West Aberdeenshire and Kincardine
- Scottish Parliament: Aberdeenshire West

Birse (Scottish Gaelic: Braois/Breis) is a parish in the Lower Deeside area of Aberdeenshire, Scotland, which includes the communities of Finzean and Ballogie. However the name Birse is often used to refer only to the northwestern part of the parish which lies on the south side of the River Dee, Aberdeenshire, opposite the village of Aboyne. The south-west part of the parish is a sparsely populated upland area known as the Forest of Birse, which gives its name to one of the houses at Aboyne Academy.

== Etymology and name ==
The name Birse was recorded in 1157 as Brass. The origin of the name is uncertain, although toponymist Simon Taylor has suggested derivation from a possible Pictish cognate of the Welsh adjective bras, in names meaning "bulky, large, fertile". However, place-names rarely consist of simplex adjectives.

== History ==
=== 1963 Vulcan crash ===
On 12 June 1963 at 11.15am Avro Vulcan XH477 crashed of 50 Sqn at RAF Waddington. The Vulcan had taken off from RAF Coningsby.

It was found on Wednesday 12 June 1963 at 9pm, at 2000 ft, on St Colms mountain. An RAF helicopter from RAF Leuchars had searched.

== Images ==
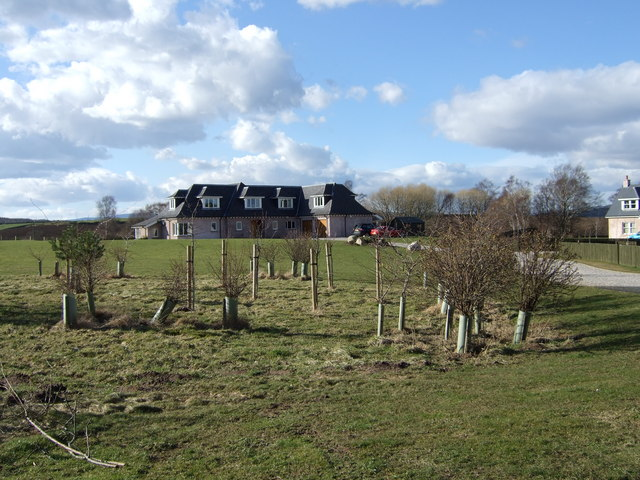
New houses in Birse

== See also ==
- Corsedardar Hill
