= Hugh of Brechin =

Scottish bishop

Hugh (Middle Irish: Áedh; died 1218) was an early 13th-century bishop of Brechin. He either from the native Gaelic ecclesiastical family of Brechin who provided the abbots and the early bishops of Brechin, men such as Léot and Samson, or else a royal clerk appointed by the king. He was bishop as early as 1214, when he appears in the sources for the first time. He died in 1218, and was succeeded by Gregory.

Religious titles
Preceded by Radulphus	Bishop of Brechin x1214-1218	Succeeded by Gregory
