= Finzean =

Coordinates: 57.0219°N 2.6293°W

Finzean: Scottish Gaelic: Fìnnean
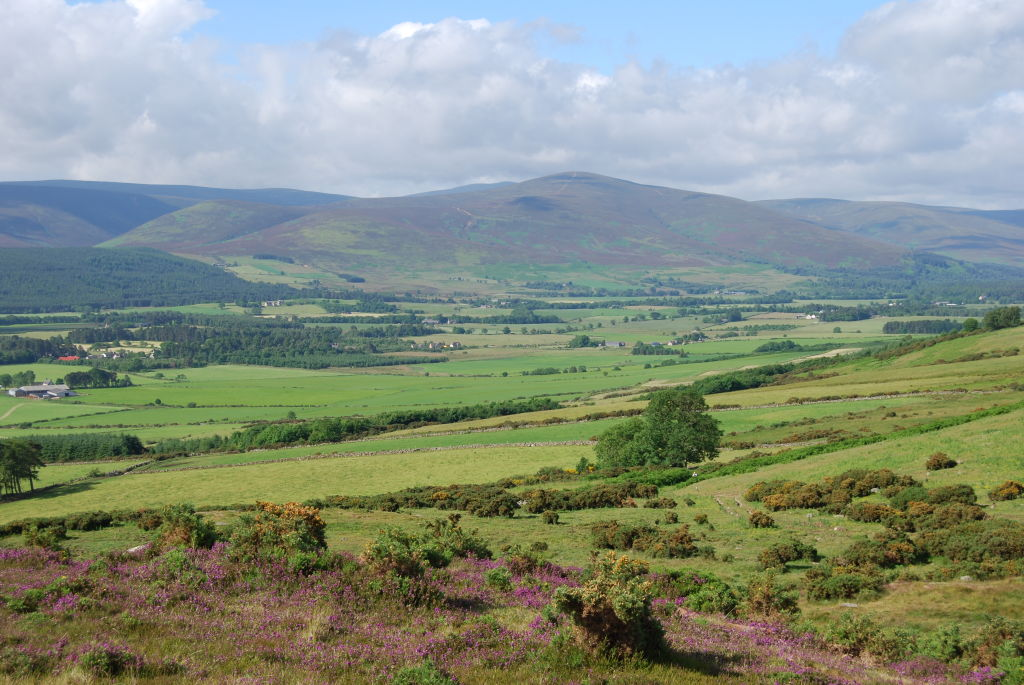
- Finzean and Peter Hill viewed from the north-east

- Location within Aberdeenshire
- Population: est. 270 (2002)
- OS grid reference: NO6192
- Council area: Aberdeenshire
- Lieutenancy area: Aberdeenshire
- Country: Scotland
- Sovereign state: United Kingdom
- Post town: Banchory
- Postcode district: AB31
- Dialling code: 01330
- Police: Scotland
- Fire: Scottish
- Ambulance: Scottish
- UK Parliament: West Aberdeenshire and Kincardine
- Scottish Parliament: Aberdeenshire West

Finzean (/ˈfɪŋən/ FING-ən; Scottish Gaelic: Fìnnean) is a rural community, electoral polling district, community council area and former ecclesiastical parish, which forms the southern part of the Parish of Birse, Aberdeenshire, Scotland. Finzean was the subject of many landscape paintings by the artist Joseph Farquharson, whose family have owned Finzean Estate (which occupies the eastern half of Finzean) since the 17th century. Finzean extends to approximately 8000 hectares in area and had a population of approximately 270 in 2002.

== Toponymy ==
Finzean is pronounced /ˈfɪŋən/. This is due to the original Scots spelling, Finȝean, containing the letter yogh, which was later erroneously confused with the tailed z.

== Geographical extent ==
Finzean occupies the upper catchment of the Water of Feugh within the area of the Lower Deeside, the main tributary of the River Dee. The southern boundary of Finzean is the old county boundary between Aberdeenshire and Kincardineshire which follows the Water of Aven (or A'an) from Loch Tennet to the Feughside Inn at Whitestone. The eastern boundary varies slightly between historic parish boundaries and modern-day polling district boundaries, but generally follows the route of the minor road north from Whitestone towards Potarch. The northern boundary of Finzean follows the watershed separating the Feugh catchment from the Burn of Cattie, although it runs slightly to the north of this ridge in the eastern part of the parish, crossing the B976 at Berrysloch. The western boundary of Finzean is the watershed separating the Feugh from Glen Tanar and Glen Esk.

The sparsely populated western half of Finzean, in the higher reaches of the Feugh catchment, is known as the Forest of Birse and does not form part of the Finzean Estate owned by the Farquharson family. The boundary between the Forest of Birse and Finzean Estate is formed by two small tributaries of the Feugh: the Finlets Burn and the Laird's Burn.

== Landscape and natural heritage ==
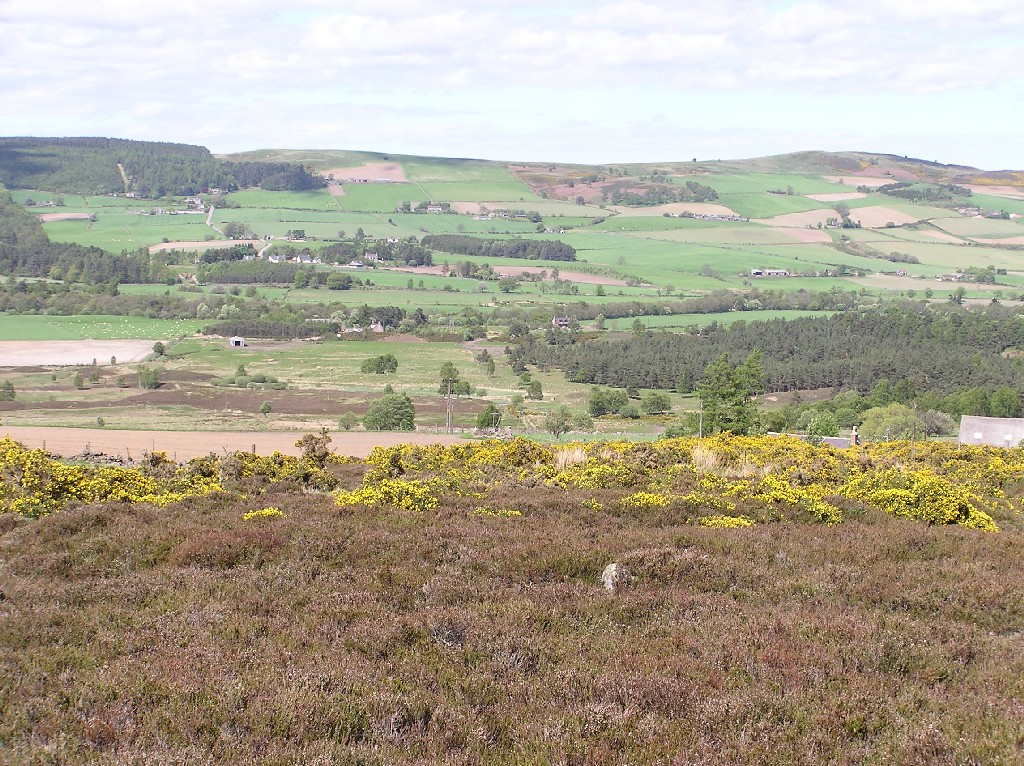
Finzean viewed from the south

The eastern end of Finzean occupies a broad valley which is a patchwork of fields and small woodlands with scattered houses, farms and small settlements. Most of the population of the parish lives in this area, with the main clusters of housing being at Finzean village, Drumhead and Percie. A ridge of low hills (highest point: Tom's Cairn, 310 metres) bounds this valley to the north and separates it from the valley of the Cattie Burn, which lies within the neighbouring community of Ballogie.

To the south and west, Finzean is shielded by higher granite hills which rise to more than 500 metres above sea level. Notable hills which are prominent in views to the south and west include Clachnaben (589 m), which lies outside Finzean, and Peter Hill (617 m), which is the most prominent hill in Finzean (although Gannoch, in the Forest of Birse, is higher at 731 metres). The hills are mostly covered with heather, but along their lower slopes, there are some extensive areas of forestry, most of which is planted with Scots pine and larch. There is also a small area of natural pine forest at Glenferrick and Finlets, which is the most easterly remnant of the ancient Caledonian Forest.

The Twin Trees of Finzean are a natural curiosity that are well known locally and have been included in the Forestry Commission's Heritage Trees of Scotland. The trees are about 100 years old and a branch from one has naturally grafted itself on to its neighbour, joining the two together in a natural arch that featured on old postcards of the area.

The Water of Feugh and the lower part of the Water of Aven are both designated as part of the River Dee Special Area of Conservation due to their importance for populations of Atlantic salmon and Eurasian otter.

== History and cultural heritage ==
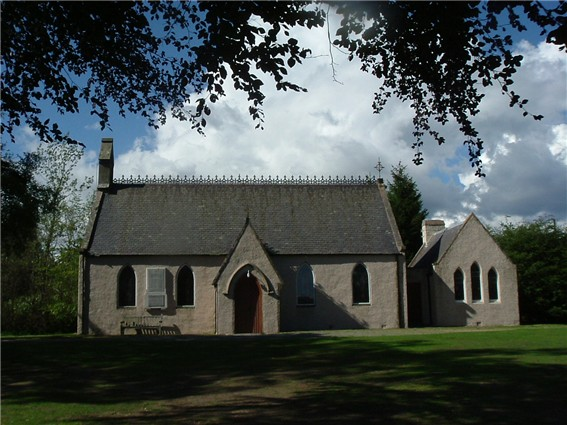
Finzean Church in 2004, before recent works

The first people to live in Finzean were hunter-gatherers during the Mesolithic era 8000 years ago. The first farmers settled during the Neolithic period about 6000 years ago. Evidence of the Neolithic settlers can be seen in the remains of Finzean House Long Cairn, one of two scheduled monuments in Finzean; the other being the Ballochan hut-circles in the Forest of Birse, which dates from the late Bronze Age or early Iron Age, between 2000 and 3000 years ago. Another well-known monument in Finzean is the Dardanus Stone, which lies alongside the B976 road at Corsedardar. This standing stone was uncovered at the end of the 18th century and has been held together by iron bars since being broken in two by workmen. The stone is alleged to commemorate a mythical Scottish king called Dardanus, who reigned in the 1st century AD according to the writer Hector Boece, although it is more likely to be a Bronze Age monument left by the Beaker people

In the 10th century the lands of Finzean became the personal property of the King of Scots, who used the Forest of Birse as a hunting reserve. In the 12th century King William the Lion gifted the area to the Bishops of Aberdeen who continued to own it until the 16th century, during which they gradually sold off all the land. During the 17th and 18th centuries, the Farquharson family acquired the whole of the eastern part of Finzean, while the Forest of Birse was owned by the Earl of Aboyne, but with ancient common rights retained by all the inhabitants of Birse parish to this day.

Evidence of the rich later history of Finzean can be seen in the 17 listed buildings and monuments that have been designated in Finzean.

Category A Listed Buildings

Finzean Bucket Mill; Finzean Sawmill and Turning Mill

Category B Listed Buildings

Birse Castle; Easter Clune; Finzean Home Farm Steading; Mill of Clinter; Tillyfruskie

Category C Listed Buildings

Birse and Feughside Parish Kirk; Birse Castle Kennels; Birse War Memorial; Bridge over Hollow Burn; Finzean House; Finzean House South Lodge; Forest of Birse Kirk; Haughend Grain Kiln; Memorial well to Joseph Farquharson; Mill of Clinter Cottage

The most important of these buildings are undoubtedly the three water-powered mills along the Water of Feugh which are owned and managed by Birse Community Trust. These wooden buildings date from the 1850s but were restored to full working order in the 1980s.

Birse Castle, which is the only remaining castle in Finzean, dates from about 1600, was restored from a ruin in 1905, and was extensively refurbished in 1999 as the main Scottish home of Charles Pearson, brother of the 4th Viscount Cowdray and owner of Dunecht estate, part of which is in the Forest of Birse.

== Finzean in the 21st century ==
The second half of the 20th century saw declines in traditional rural industries in Finzean, as elsewhere. There are now only seven tenant farms in Finzean where there were nearly 20 in the 1950s, and Finzean estate's own farming operation now dominates much of the area. This decline was countered by the growing wealth generated by the advent of the North Sea oil industry in the 1970s, which brought an influx of new people to Aberdeen and other parts of north-east Scotland.

Finzean is now a small community, with a primary school attended by about 50 children, a parish church that was extended and refurbished in 2005, a community hall that was rebuilt in 2003, and community woodlands. Apart from the farms and estates, local businesses include a shop and post office, a farm shop and tearoom, a furniture restorer and cabinetmaker, a shortbread manufacturer and a number of building contractors and self-employed tradespeople.

The third meeting of the Rural Development Council, chaired by Richard Lochhead, was held in Finzean village hall in December 2008.
