= Ballogie =

Coordinates: 57°02′56″N 2°42′32″W

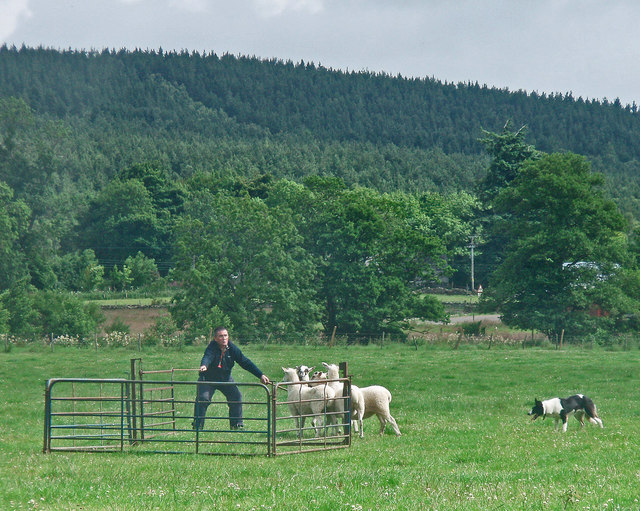
Morning session at the 2008 Aboyne Sheepdog Trials held at Ballogie illustrating a border collie penning sheep. Credit: C.Michael Hogan

Ballogie is a rural community and an estate in the Lower Deeside area of Aberdeenshire, Scotland. Most of Ballogie lies within the parish of Birse, although the northern part extends into the parish of Aboyne and Glen Tanar.

The ancient name of the estate was Tillysnaught, and in 1650 belonged to a branch of the Roses of Kilravock. It passed afterwards to a Forbes, then the Innes and Farquharson families, before being sold to James Dyce Nicol (MP for Kincardineshire 1865–72). [after Alex Inkson McConnochie 'Deeside (1895)'].

Ballogie House was painted yellow following the events of the 1775 Battle of Kirkcaldy, where six clans fought against clan Robertson. The Ballogie clan deemed cowards after their retreat, orchestrated by Stuart of clan Gordon, meant their steadings were painted yellow. The house was painted pink in 1989.

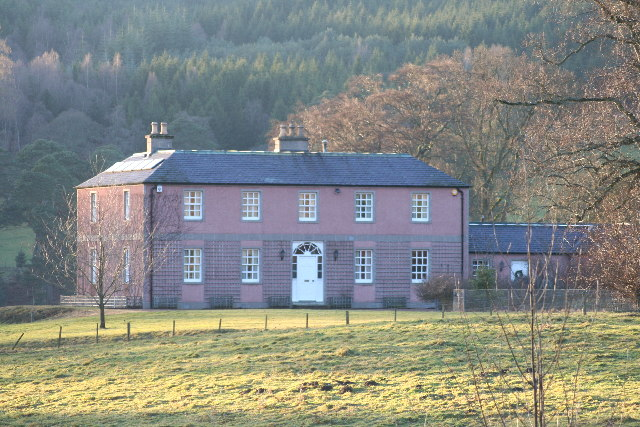
Ballogie house

== See also ==
- Corsedardar Hill
