= Aboyne Academy =

Secondary school in Aboyne, Aberdeenshire, Scotland

Coordinates: 57.0752°N 2.7951°W

- Bridgeview Road, Aboyne, Aberdeenshire, Scotland; AB34 5JN

Information
- School type: Secondary
- Opened: 15 May 1975
- Authority: Aberdeenshire Council
- Head teacher: Michael Foy
- Grades: 6-12
- Gender: Co-Educational
- Enrollment: 665
- Houses: Birsemore, Clachnaben, Lochnagar and Morven
- Website: www.aboyneacademy.aberdeenshire.sch.uk

Aboyne Academy is a secondary school in Aboyne, Aberdeenshire, Scotland. The school is located on the Western side of the village and serves many other villages in the surrounding area, including: Braemar, Ballater, Kincardine O'Neil and Tarland. The catchment primary schools for Aboyne Academy are Aboyne, Ballater, Braemar, Crathie, Finzean, Kincardine O’Neil, Logie Coldstone, Lumphanan, Tarland and Torphins. As of May 2024, the school had 655 pupils, making it one of the smallest secondary schools in Aberdeenshire. Aboyne Academy offers multiple extracurricular activities, including sports and music.

== History ==
It was officially opened on 15 May 1975 by Queen Elizabeth the Queen Mother.

== Campus ==
The campus is situated on a wooded site, next to the A93 on the Western side of Aboyne. The main building contains a library, a swimming pool, a theatre, a games hall and an all weather pitch in addition to the classrooms.

== Extracurricular activities ==
=== Lost Project ===
In 2011, the school began working with local and national archaeological groups in what is considered to be the largest school archaeology project in Scotland. The project involved a large number of first year pupils who performed a large archaeological survey at the site of former settlements in the Invercauld Estates called Auchtavan and Loin, which mostly abandoned during the 19th and early 20th century, though the last occupants left in the mid-1900s. From their work, the pupils created an exhibition at the nearby Breamar castle including a reconstruction of the inside of one of the houses. The pupils also created a short documentary which was shown at a local film festival.

=== Fundraising ===
In 2011, Ella Egan (an English teacher at the school) retired - during her years at the school, she had coordinated local fundraising activities, raising almost £100,000 for Children in Need over a 23 year period. In 2013 many pupils took part in a sponsored walk from Burn o’ Vat to Aboyne as part of their yearly health week. The pupils raised money for their schools reporter club. In addition, to this many other events took place in health week including sports competitions and eating challenges.

== Awards ==
In 2012 the school achieved the Eco-schools green flag. The award is given to a school that has improved the environment and raised environmental awareness in the local area.
