= Forest of Birse =

Coordinates: 57.00°N 2.77°W

- Location within Aberdeenshire
- OS grid reference: NO5390
- Council area: Aberdeenshire
- Lieutenancy area: Aberdeenshire
- Country: Scotland
- Sovereign state: United Kingdom
- Post town: Banchory
- Postcode district: AB31
- Dialling code: 01330
- Police: Scotland
- Fire: Scottish
- Ambulance: Scottish
- UK Parliament: West Aberdeenshire and Kincardine
- Scottish Parliament: Aberdeenshire West

The Forest of Birse is a remote upland area in the upper catchment of the Water of Feugh, which forms the south-western portion of the Parish of Birse, Aberdeenshire, Scotland. It also forms the western part of the community of Finzean, but has a separate, complex history of landownership relating to its status as a commonty, which has involved a large number of disputes since the 16th century. In more recent decades, the forest has been a popular destination for people from Aberdeen taking picnics, as it is the closest area of Highland scenery to the city.

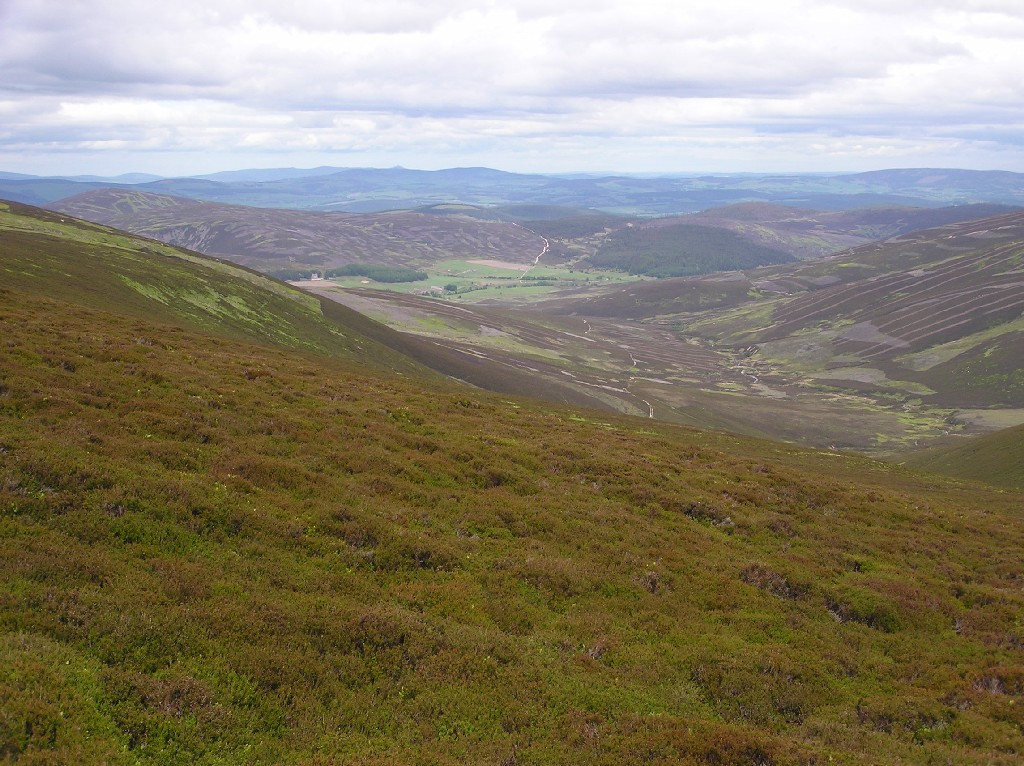
Looking north from Tampie hill over the Forest of Birse towards Birse castle and Ballochan

== Description ==
The eastern boundary of the Forest of Birse is marked by the Finlets and Laird's burns; two minor tributaries of the Feugh (itself a tributary of the River Dee) which join the river about 1 kilometre upstream from Woodend. Otherwise the boundary generally follows the watershed of the Feugh, which runs along the tops of the following hills (clockwise from the south): Baudnacauner, Cock Hill, Hill of Cammie, Mudlee Bracks, Tampie, Gannoch, Hill of St, Colm, Craigmahandle, Hill of Duchery, Brackenstake, Lamahip and Corybeg. The Forest of Birse extends to approximately 35 square kilometres, and reaches its highest point at Gannoch (731 m).

The underlying bedrock of the Forest of Birse is granite, from which most of the soil in the area is derived. However, a thick layer of peat has formed over many of the higher hills, creating extensive areas of blanket bog. Historically, a 'Forest' was an uncultivated area set aside for hunting and was not necessarily wooded, and indeed Heather moorland is the principal habitat in the Forest of Birse. However, native pine woodland has regenerated across approximately 5 square kilometres of the northern slopes of the Forest of Birse since the Second World War, principally on the Finlets, Lamahip and Bogturk hills. There are also fragments of riparian woodland along many of the watercourses of the forest, containing a diverse range of native trees including birch, hazel, aspen and holly. Within the Forest of Birse there are two small areas of cultivated land at Auchabrack and Ballochan, which also contain the forest's only inhabited buildings. These comprise Birse Castle and three other houses.

The rich wildlife of the Forest of Birse includes the mountain hare, red and roe deer, red grouse, black grouse, golden plover, hen harrier, merlin, peregrine falcons, crossbills and the area is occasionally visited by golden eagles and capercaillie. Part of the area was declared an Important Bird Area by BirdLife International and there was an unsuccessful attempt to have part of the area designated as a Site of Special Scientific Interest in the early 1990s.

== History ==
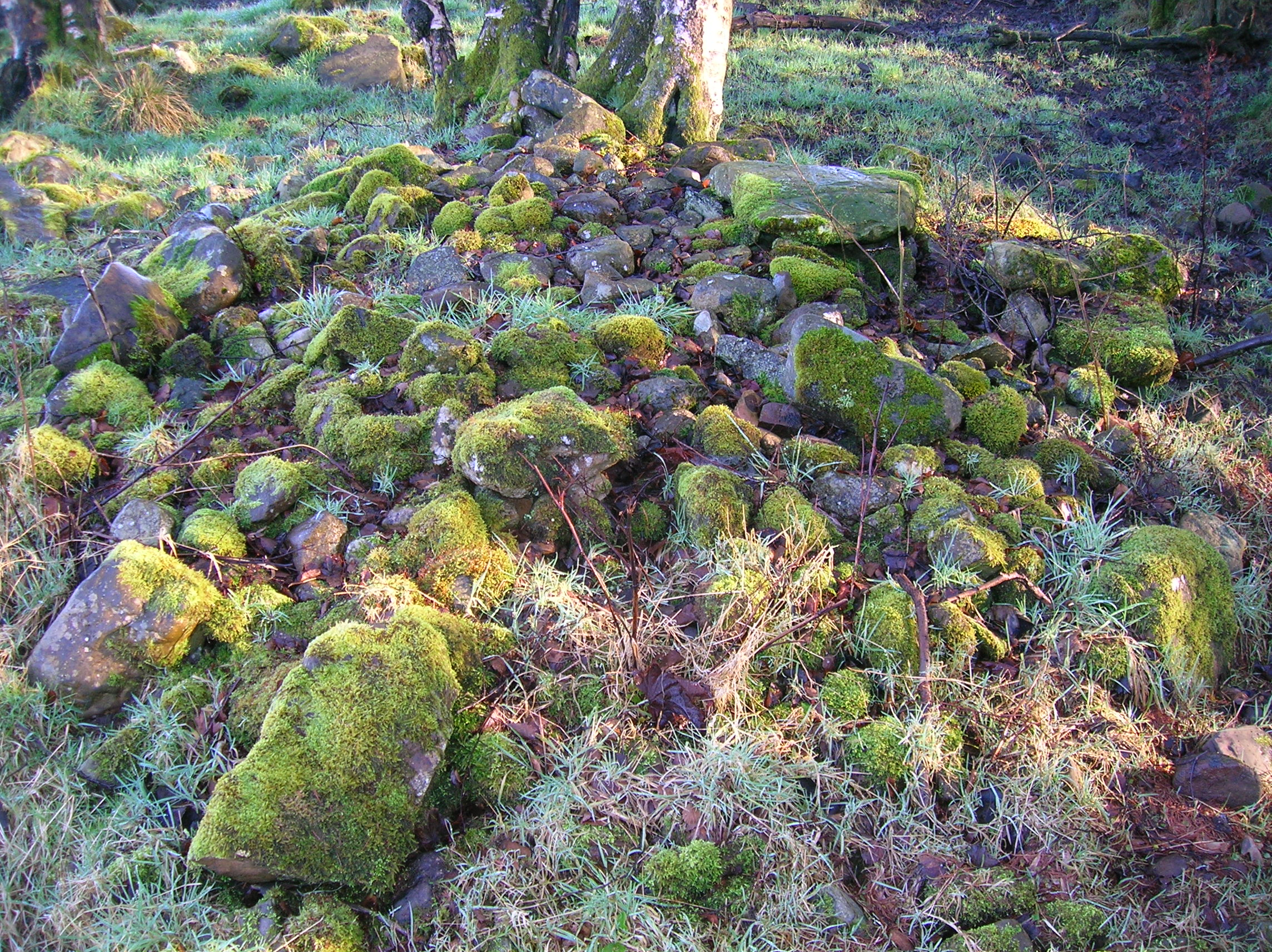
A typical clearance cairn.

The earliest inhabitants of the forest were mesolithic hunter-gatherers about 8000 years ago. However, the first evidence of settlement comes from the Bronze Age, about 3000 years ago, in the form of field systems, clearance cairns and hut circles, of which there are several good examples in the Forest of Birse. At this time, cereal crops were probably grown on areas that are now covered with heather. At the beginning of the Iron Age there was a climatic deterioration and these farms were probably abandoned at that time and gradually reclaimed by nature. The Forest of Birse remained uninhabited from then until the 17th century.

By the 10th century AD, the Forest of Birse (along with the rest of Birse) had become the personal property of the King of Scots, and was used as a Royal Hunting Forest. Kenneth II hunted here in 995 AD and Kenneth III in 1005 AD. In 1170, King William the Lion gave Birse to Matthew, Bishop of Aberdeen. The charter associated with this transfer is the first reference to the uninhabited Forest of Birse as a distinct area from the rest of Birse, where most of the population lived. Over the following 400 years the Bishops allowed the inhabitants of the wider parish of Birse the common right to use the forest for the collection of timber and peat and for summer grazing.

The Bishop of Aberdeen sold off their properties in Birse between 1549 and 1620, around the time of the reformation. All of the new landowners (and their tenants) were also granted the common right to use the forest for timber, peat and grazing. The forest itself was sold to William Gordon of Cluny in 1585 and in 1610 the Gordons enclosed the best part of the common grazing, brought in tenant farmers and built a castle. However, after falling into debt, the Gordons of Cluny sold the forest to William Douglas of Glenbervie in 1636 and in 1640 the other landowners in Birse burnt down Birse castle and drove the tenant farmers out of the forest in order to re-establish their common rights there. In 1666 the forest was sold to the Earl of Aboyne.

In 1724 the Earl of Aboyne enclosed the land around Birse Castle again and once more tenant farmers were brought into the forest. At around the same time, the Farquharsons of Finzean enclosed another area of land in the forest at Auchabrack, which had previously been the site of a shieling for one of their tenants. This encroachment onto the common grazing led to legal disputes with the other landowners with rights in the forest, which were resolved by the Court of Session in 1755. The ruling allowed the two enclosed areas to remain as the private property of the Earl of Aboyne and the Farquharsons of Finzean respectively, but reconfirmed the common rights of everyone in Birse over the remainder of the forest.

During the 19th century, the rise in the popularity and economic value of grouse shooting associated with the Victorian era led to a series of legal disputes over the hunting rights in the forest that were not fully resolved until 1897. The final ruling was that, while the Earl of Aboyne owned the land in the forest, the hunting rights were divided between the Earl of Aboyne and the neighbouring estate of Ballogie, which had been bought by the Nicol family in the 1850s. The division of hunting rights (which remains to this day) follows a line from the summit of Gannoch, down the Allanstank burn, along the Feugh to the Forest of Birse kirk and then along a track which runs north to Glencat. Ballogie estate have the hunting rights to the south and east of this line (the majority of the forest).

In the same year as the final ruling on the hunting rights, the Earl of Aboyne sold the Forest of Birse to Joseph Robert Heaven, who rebuilt Birse Castle. After Heaven died in 1911, the Forest of Birse was bought by Weetman Pearson, 1st Viscount Cowdray and became part of his Dunecht estate. In 1978, ownership of Dunecht estates (including the Forest of Birse) was passed by the 3rd Viscount Cowdray to his younger son, Charles Pearson, who is the current owner. The farmland at Auchabrack was sold by the Farquharsons of Finzean to the Nicols of Ballogie in 1938.

Throughout most of the 20th century, the Forest of Birse was largely treated as an extension of the two estates which shared the hunting rights, as the older, common uses, such as summer grazing, peat cutting and timber had largely fallen into disuse. However, in the 1970s the regeneration of woodland in part of the forest and the felling of a small area of mature woodland by Dunecht estate raised awareness of the ancient common rights held by all the inhabitants of Birse parish, as the use of timber was one of these common rights.

After several years of negotiation, a historic agreement was reached in 1999, in which the ancient rights over the forest held by all the inhabitants of Birse parish were vested in a body known as Birse Community Trust, which uses these rights to manage the 5 square kilometres of woodland that is regenerating in the north-east part of the forest. Ballogie and Dunecht estates continue to manage the remainder of the forest primarily for grouse shooting, and all three parties have regular meetings to discuss matters of common interest in the forest.

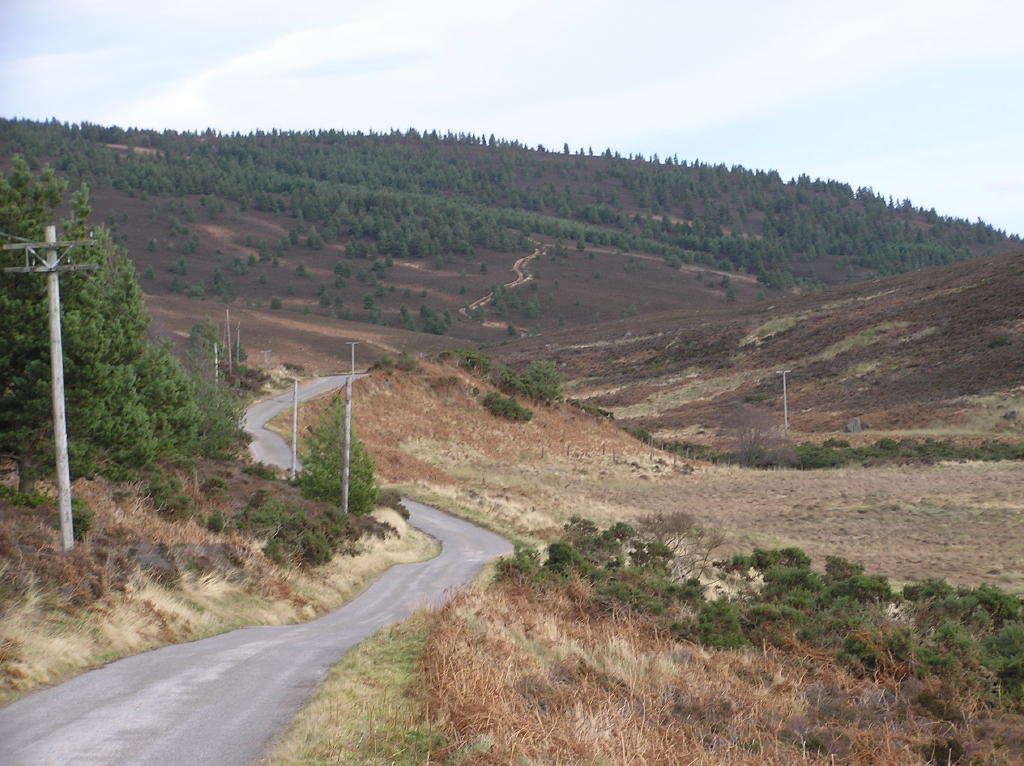
Native pinewood regenerating in the Forest of Birse
