= The Shortening Winter's Day is near a Close =

Painting by Joseph Farquharson

The Shortening Winter's Day is Near a Close
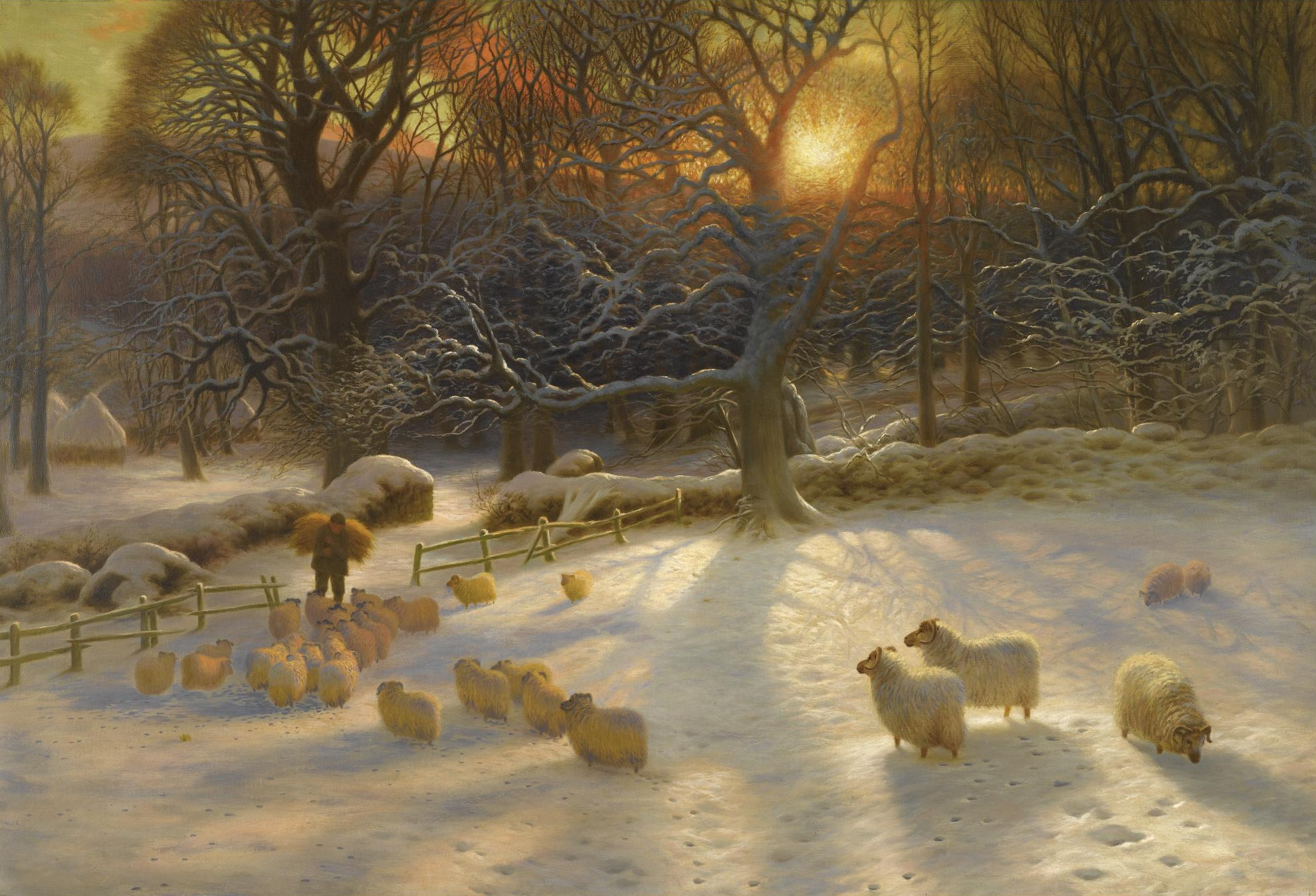
- Artist: Joseph Farquharson
- Year: c. 1903
- Medium: Oil on canvas
- Dimensions: 82 cm × 120 cm (32 in × 47 in)
- Location: Private collection

The Shortening Winter's Day is Near a Close (1903) and its replicas -- The Shortening Winter's Day is Near a Close (circa 1903) and Beneath the Snow Encumbered Branches (name attached in 2008) -- are three oil on canvas paintings by Scottish painter Joseph Farquharson. The iconic artworks depict a shepherd tending sheep with the evening sun shining through snowy trees.

• The Shortening Winter's Day is Near a Close (117 x 171 cm) is the prime version, held at the Lady Lever Art Gallery in Port Sunlight, England, under Accession Number LL3152.

• The Shortening Winter's Day is Near a Close (82 x 120 cm) version was purchased by a private collector in 2013.

• The 51 x 76 cm version, was last sold to a private collector in 2016 under the title Beneath the Snow Encumbered Branches.

The image has become well known through the use of its likeness on popular Hallmark Christmas cards for over 30 years.

== Background ==
Painter and Laird Farquharson owned a 20,000-acre (8,100 ha) estate at Finzean, Royal Deeside, Aberdeenshire, where he enjoyed painting wintery scenes, particularly of sheep. This in turn had led to his nickname of "Frozen Mutton Farquharson".

Farquharson's considerable commercial success was based on the snow scenes he exhibited almost annually at the Royal Academy of Arts from 1894 until 1925, and celebrated printsellers Frost & Reed assured him a steady income by selling deluxe editions of his works. This subject is one of his most celebrated, and the primary version (now in the Lady Lever Art Gallery) was shown at the RA in 1903. Farquharson was known to create several versions of his best works, either to sell as replicas or to retain as aides memoires. Often artists painted replicas for engravers to work from when the original painting was not available and it is possible that one of these replicas served such a purpose; a highly popular print of The Shortening Winter's Day is near a Close sold in the many thousands by Farquharson's publisher Frost & Reed.

== History ==
The prime version of The Shortening Winter's Day is near a Close (Lady Lever Art Gallery) was displayed at the Royal Academy Exhibition of 1903.

The 82 x 120 cm version does not have a definitive date it was painted, but it is probable it was soon after the exhibition of 1903 and likely to have been painted to satisfy a patron that had been disappointed not to be able to purchase the exhibited painting that Lever had secured when it was on the walls of the Academy. This 82 x 120 cm version under the name The Shortening Winter's Day is near a Close was auctioned in 2008 by Sotheby's and again by Bonhams in 2013. In 2013 it fetched £157,250 (US$200,599)

The 51 x 76 cm version was with the Richard Green Gallery in 1972 and reproduced in Country Life on 1 June that year. The Card company WN Sharpe purchased the rights to use the painting in greetings cards in the 1970s. The company later was acquired by the Hallmark Cards company, which continues to own these rights. In 2008, Hallmark's Jo Marchbank said, "This painting is one of our most popular Christmas cards. It is probably something to do with the unique atmosphere Farquharson creates, the dramatic yet subtle depiction of a winter landscape." Over the course of its use as a design on Christmas cards, it is thought to have been reproduced hundreds of thousands of times.

The 51 x 76 cm version had been sold in the 1960s to a private Scottish collector for £1,450. When this version went to auction in 2008 it was listed with the title Beneath the Snow Encumbered Branches by Lyon & Turnbull auctioneers with the note "A painting of this title was exhibited at the Royal Academy in 1901". There was some public interest in the piece at this time with the "Christmas card painting" resurfacing. Sold at Lyon & Turnbull auctioneers in Edinburgh, it was estimated that it would sell for between £50,000 and £70,000, but sold for more than twice that estimate to another private collector in Scotland. The painting was auctioned again by Lyon & Turnbull on 9 June 2016 for £146,500 (US$186,800).

In December 2009, Gyles Brandreth presented a piece on the history of the painting for BBC One's The One Show.

== Aesthetics ==
The painting, like Farquharson's other landscapes, was painted on his estate at Finzean, Royal Deeside. One of his descendants, Sir Angus Farquharson of Finzean, later said that he thought he had found the exact spot at Finzean where the painting was created.

The shepherd in the painting was actually an employee of Farquharson whom he had asked to pose for the image. Whilst he was painting he noticed that the model was beginning to turn blue and so offered the man the chance to come inside his painting hut to warm up; the man declined so that Farquharson could finish the painting more quickly.
