= Kinniburgh =

Kinniburgh is a surname. Notable people with the surname include:

- Elizabeth Kinniburgh (1929–2006), ordained minister in Scotland
- Graham Kinniburgh (1942–2003), Australian organised crime figure from Kew, a suburb of Melbourne
- Steven Kinniburgh (born 1989), Scottish footballer and football coach
- William Kinniburgh (born 1984), Scottish footballer who played for Motherwell, Ayr United and Partick Thistle
