= Peter de Ramsay =

Peter de Ramsay [Ramsey] (died 1256) was a 13th-century cleric based in Scotland. His background and origins are obscure. He was the son of a "cleric in minor orders" and an unmarried girl and, according to John of Fordun, he was of "noble birth". He was probably the son of Ness de Ramsey, a baron of Fife.

The first notice of him comes in 1247 when, as a mere deacon, he is elected to succeed Radulf de Lamley as Bishop of Aberdeen. The chapter of Aberdeen wrote to the Pope requesting papal dispensation for Ramsay's illegitimacy as well as permission for the consecration to take place in Scotland. Upon receiving news of Ramsay's consecration, Pope Innocent IV wrote to David de Bernham, Bishop of St Andrews, Clement, Bishop of Dunblane, and Albin, Bishop of Brechin, delegating the matter to them and instructing these bishops to make their own judgment on the matter, after which, they were to receive Ramsay's oath in his name.

The result of this is shown by Ramsay's successful accession to the bishopric. During his episcopate he became one of the royal councillors appointed by Henry III of England in 1255 for the minority of King Alexander III of Scotland. He sanctioned Alan Durward's endowment of a chaplaincy of "Logydurnach" (Logie-durno) in 1251, and was alleged have sanctioned a constitution for his diocese. He died in late 1256.

Religious titles
Preceded by Radulf de Lamley	Bishop of Aberdeen; 1247–1256	Succeeded by Richard de Potton
