= Turpin of Brechin =

Bishop of Brechin

Turpin was a 12th-century bishop of Brechin. Turpin had come to the court of king William the Lion as early as 1170, when his name begins to appear in the charters of king William. He was elected to the see of Brechin in 1178, probably with the backing of King William, and consecrated in 1180. His death date is not known, but it was certainly before the year 1198. He was succeeded by Radulphus.

Catholic Church titles
Preceded by Samson	Bishop of Brechin; 1178/80-x1198	Succeeded by Radulphus
