= Clachnaben =

Hill in Aberdeenshire, Scotland

Coordinates: 56.96812°N 2.63319°W

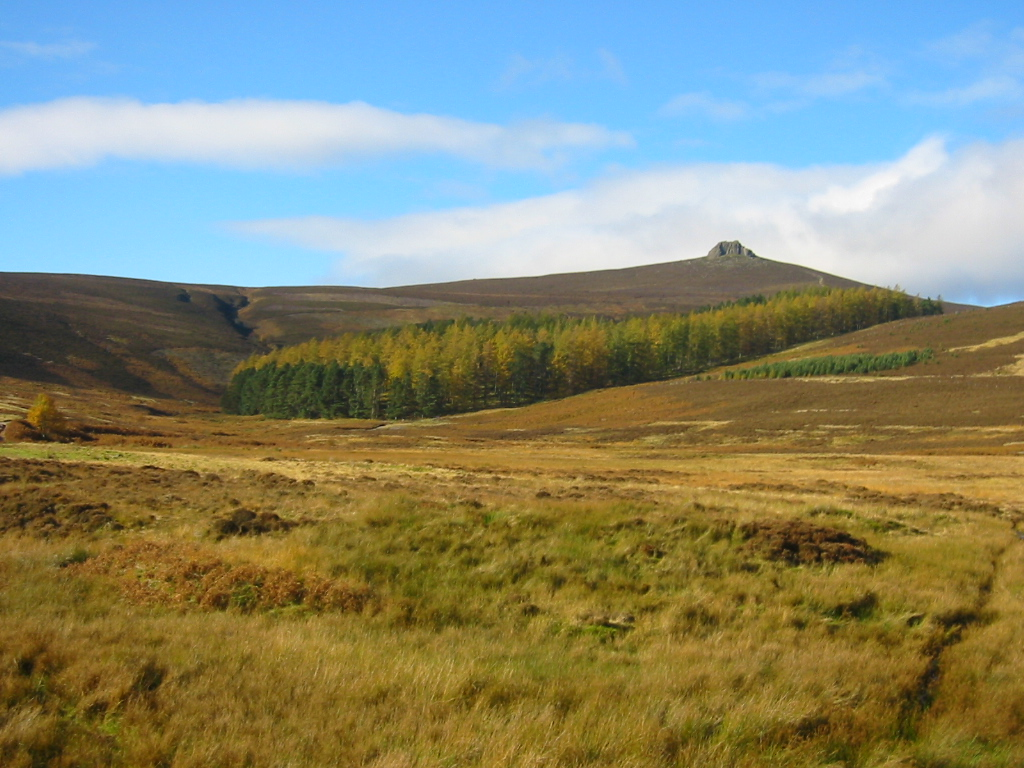
- Clachnaben from Glen Dye

Highest point
- Elevation: 589 m (1,932 ft)
- Prominence: c. 54 m
- Listing: Tump

Naming
- English translation: Rock of the Hill
- Language of name: Gaelic

Geography
- Location: Aberdeenshire, Scotland
- OS grid: NO616865
- Topo map: OS Landranger 45

Clachnaben (archaically "Cloch-na'bain"; Scottish Gaelic: "Clach na Beinne") is a 589-metre hill in Glen Dye, Aberdeenshire, Scotland. It is a distinctive hill visible from many points on Lower Deeside and is topped with a large granite tor. Clachnaben is the war cry of Clan Strachan. The hill gives its name to one of the houses at Aboyne Academy.

== Geography ==
A popular walk starts at the car park on the Cairn O' Mounth (Banchory–Fettercairn) road, 10 kilometres south of Banchory. Popularity has caused some erosion on the old steep path which climbs this hill directly; however, efforts have been made to stabilise the erosion. A new improved path takes an easier and less direct route from Millar's Bog to the summit. There are views to Mount Battock, Lochnagar and Bennachie.

The granite tor provides some rock climbing. An annual fell race is run on the hill.

== Gallery ==
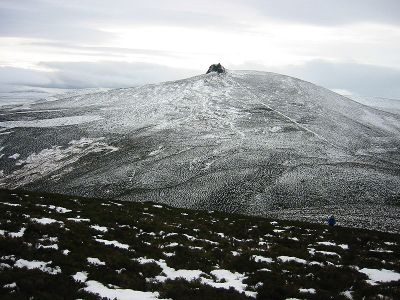
Clachnaben from Mount Shade

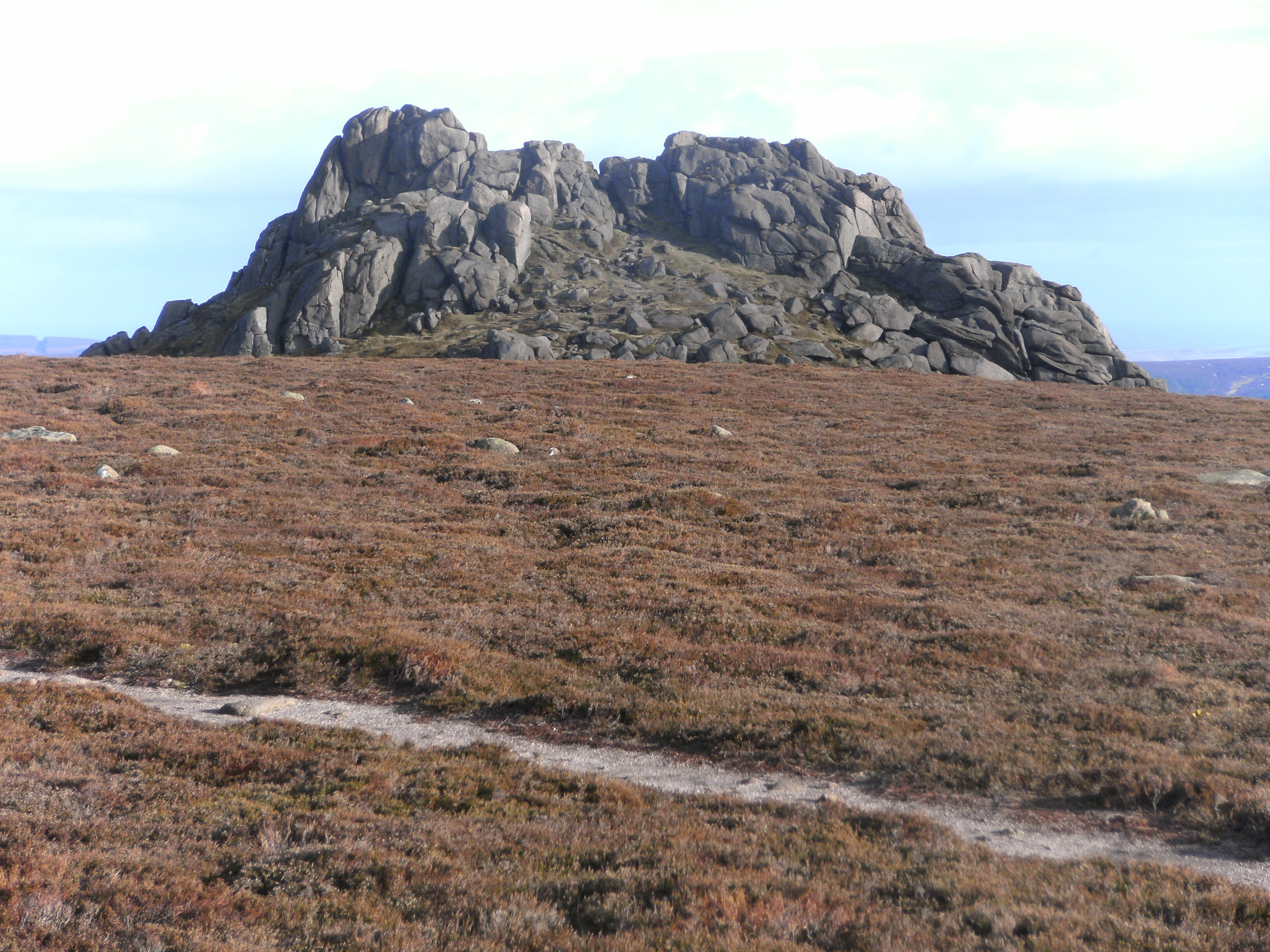
View from below

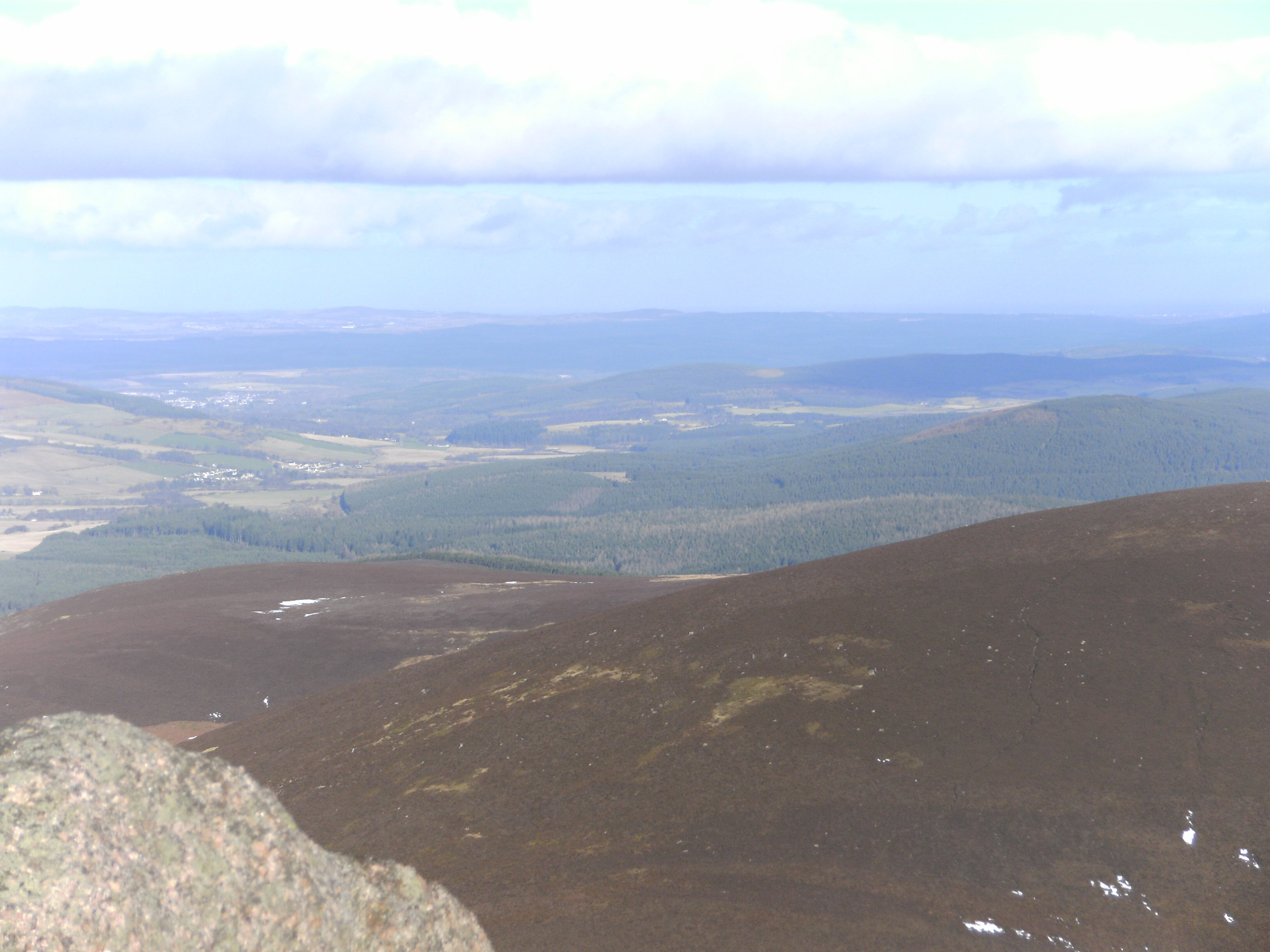
View from the top
