= William de Crachin =

Roman Catholic bishop

- Bishop of Brechin
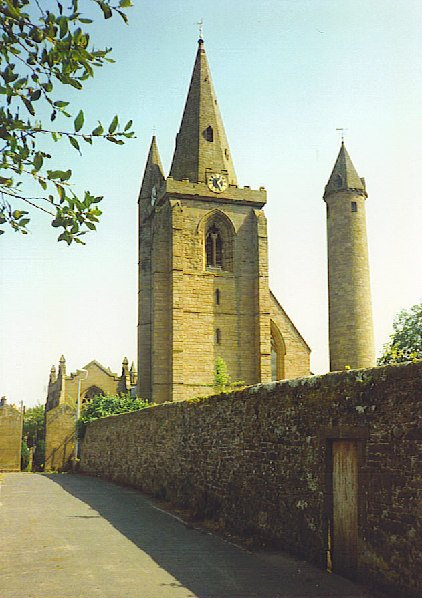
- Brechin Cathedral with "Irish" round tower
- See: Brechin
- In office: elect, 1269 x 1275
- Predecessor: Albin
- Successor: William de Kilconquhar
- Previous post(s): Dean of Brechin

Personal details
- Born: unknown unknown
- Died: 1274 (unlikely); Probably Lyons

William de Crachin (died c. 1274) was a prelate active in the Kingdom of Scotland in the 13th century. The earliest known Dean of Brechin Cathedral, his first appearance in a surviving source comes 22 September 1248, from a document of Arbroath Abbey.

He appears again in a Brechin document dating either 1256x1261 or 1267. His surname de Crachin, unknown to historians such as John Dowden, occurs in National Library of Scotland MS 34.6.24 fo. 377, the underlying text of which dates 1246 x 1266.

Between 1269 and 1275 he was elected bishop of Brechin. He had died by 24 May 1275 (date of mandate for his successor's provision). The Chronica Extracta says that he died, still merely "elect" (i.e. not having received consecration) at the Second Council of Lyons, though there is uncertainty among modern writers about the reliability of this extract.

The Chronica described him as "a man in all things praiseworthy, but of harsh voice".

== Notes ==
Catholic Church titles
Unknown	Dean of Brechin x 1248–1274 x 1275	Succeeded by Thomas de Dundee
Preceded by Albin	Bishop of Brechin; 1269 x 1275 (elect)	Succeeded by William de Kilconquhar
