= Joseph Farquharson =

Scottish painter (1846–1935)

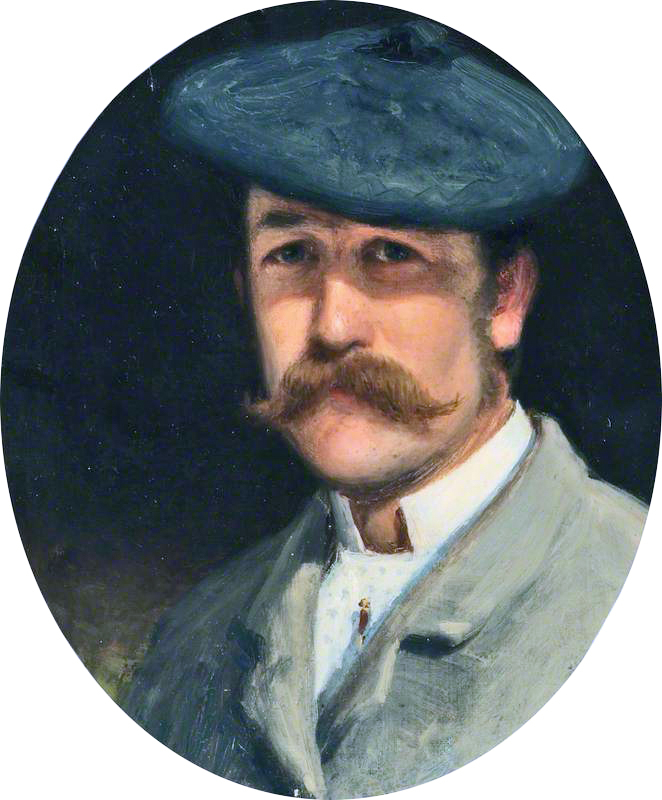
Self portrait (1882)

Joseph Farquharson DL RA (4 May 1846 – 15 April 1935) was a Scottish painter, chiefly of landscapes in Scotland often including animals. He is most famous for his snowy winter landscapes, often featuring sheep and often depicting dawn or dusk. He was born in Edinburgh, Scotland and died at Finzean, Aberdeenshire, Scotland. Nicknames include "'Frozen Mutton' Farquharson" and "The Painting Laird".

== Background and early life ==
Joseph Farquharson combined a long and prolific career as a painter with his inherited role as a Scottish laird. He painted in both oils and water colours. His mother, a celebrated beauty, was a daughter of Robert Ainslie. His early days were spent in his father's house in Northumberland Street below Queen Street Gardens and later at Eaton Terrace beyond the Dean Bridge, Edinburgh and at Finzean, the family estate in the Highlands. His father Francis was a doctor and laird of Finzean. Joseph was educated in Edinburgh and permitted by his father to paint only on Saturdays using his father's paint box. When Joseph reached the age of 12, Francis Farquharson bought his son his first paints and only a year later he exhibited his first painting at the Royal Scottish Academy.

== Artistic career ==
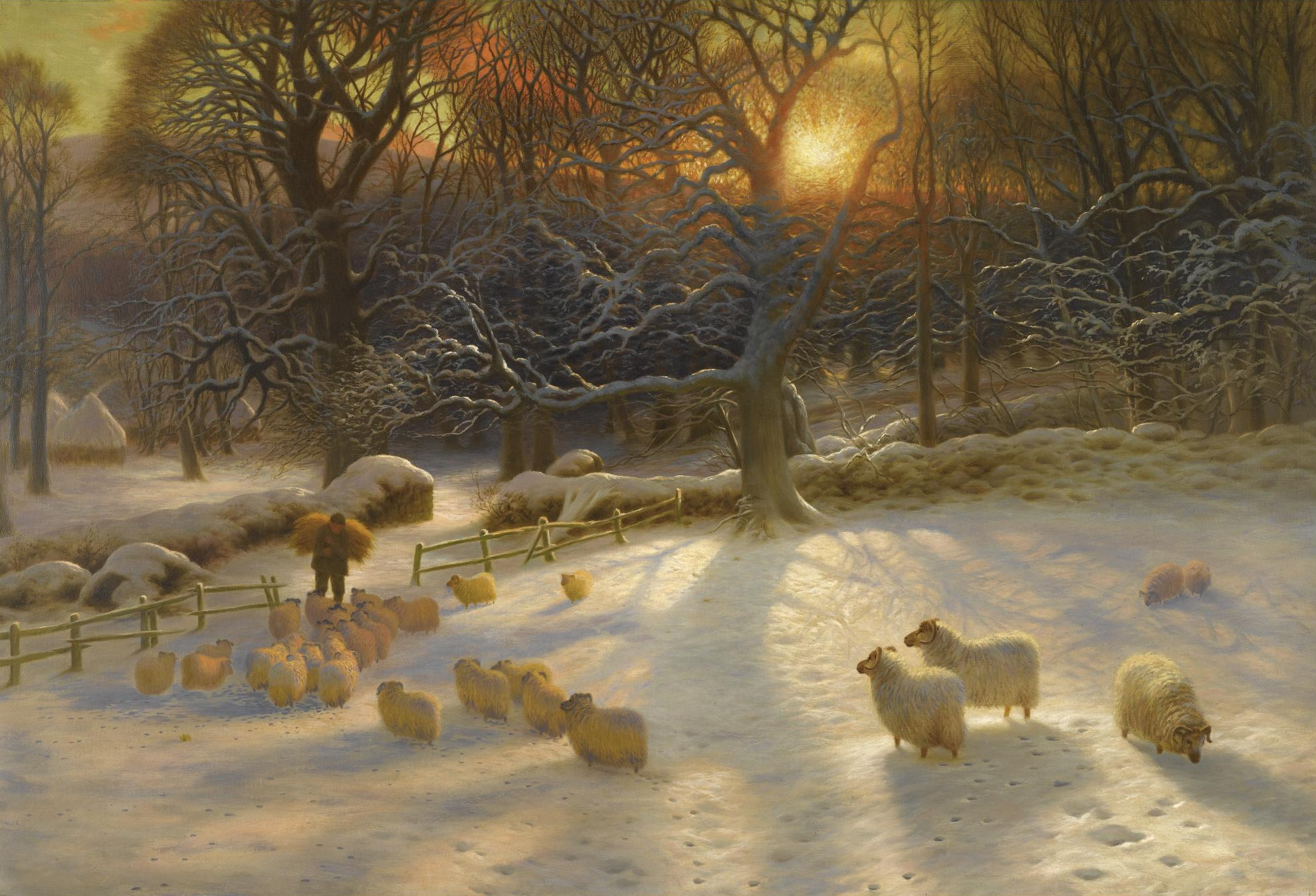
Beneath the Snow Encumbered Branches (1901), oil on canvas

Farquharson trained at the Trustees' Academy in Edinburgh during the 1860s. "The Painting Laird" (though he did not yet hold the title of laird) studied first under Peter Graham R.A. and then at the Life School at the Royal Scottish Academy. Graham, a popular Scottish Landscape painter, remained a close friend and his influence on Farquharson is unmistakable.

His first exhibit at the Royal Academy, Day's Dying Glow, was in 1873. Much like other leading Aberdeen artists John Philip and William Dyce, he bypassed Edinburgh and Glasgow in favour of London in order to win a wider audience and patrons. His first major portrait, Miss Alice Farquhar, was exhibited in 1884. Farquharson is most famous for his works portraying sheep and his finest works often include a human figure. Men and women of Scotland going about their everyday labours are frequently depicted in dramatic landscapes. Nearly all the early works were inspired by his rural surroundings and he went on to make snow scenes his trademark. Other subjects he often painted were burns and fly fishing.

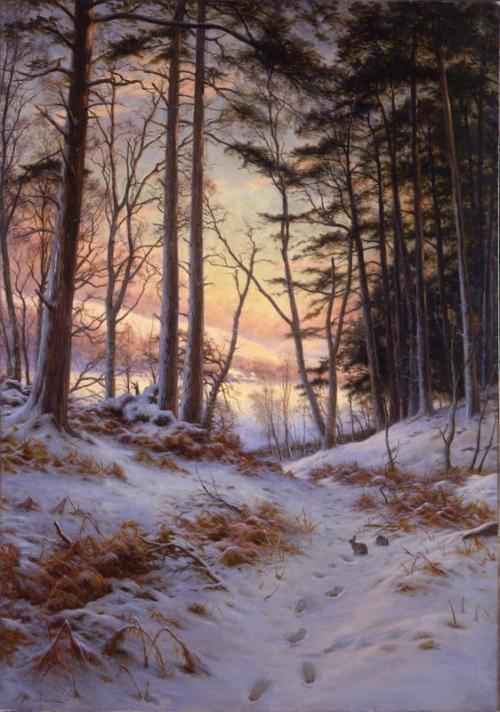
Afterglow (1912), Aberdeen Archives, Gallery & Museums Collection

Farquharson was most adept at capturing the warmth and light of sun rises and twilight. The watershed in his career was marked by three or four winters spent from 1880 onwards in Paris. There he studied under Carolus-Duran, an admirer of Velázquez. Carolus-Duran taught his students to use the brush straight away and think in terms of form and colour. As a result, Farquharson's work was always characterized by richly handled paint. Many of his paintings were completed in the north east of Scotland at his beloved Finzean. In 1885 he went to North Africa. Among the works created during the subsequent 8 years were The Egyptian and On the Banks of the Nile outside Cairo. These paintings are excellent but often go forgotten today.

The unusual titles of many of Farquharson's paintings stand out and are sometimes long. Many of them were taken from poems by Burns, Milton, Shakespeare and Gray. Farquharson was very patriotic and well versed in Scottish literature.

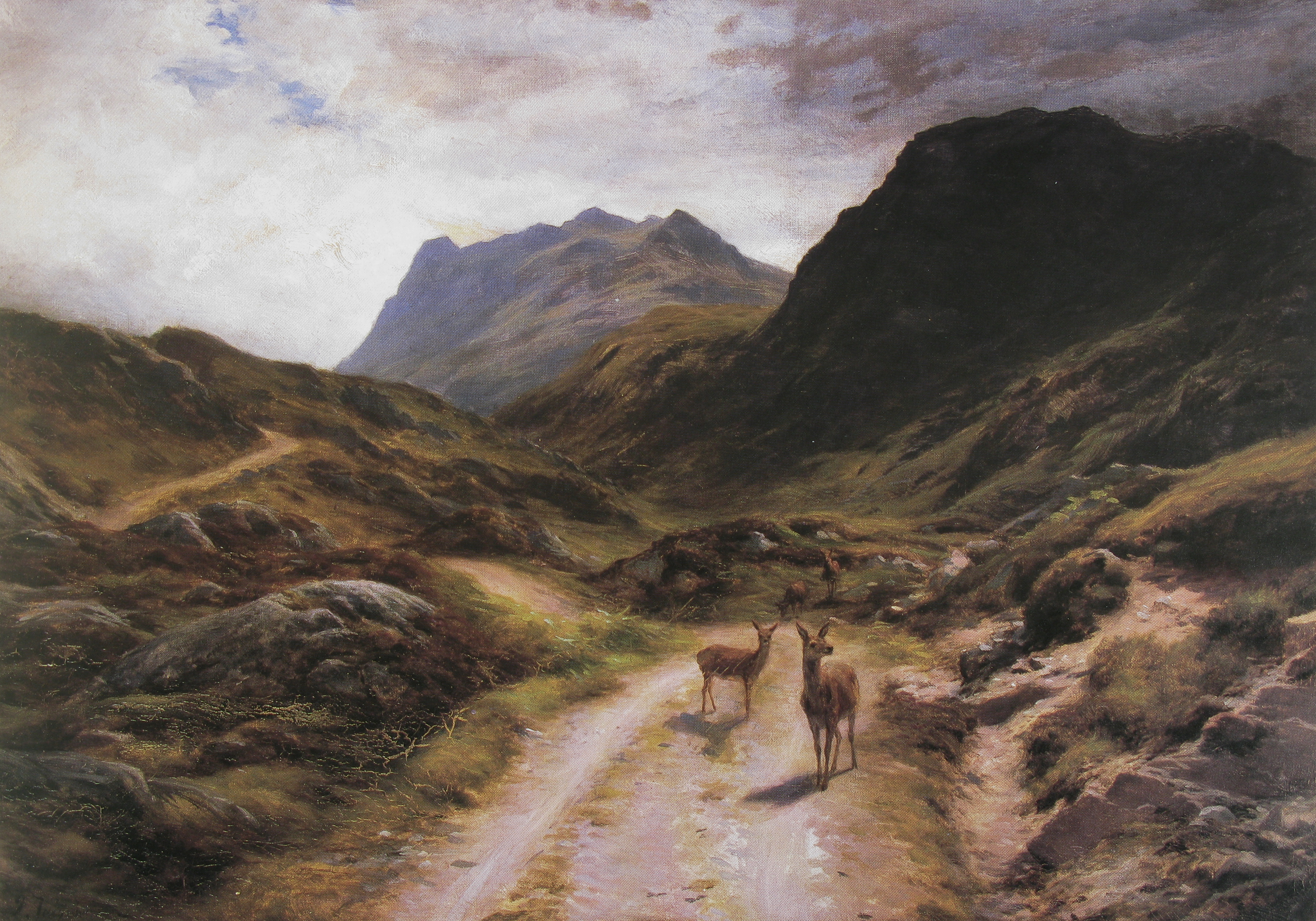
Road to Loch Maree, oil on canvas, 61 x 91.5 cm (date unknown)

He was elected Associate of the Royal Academy in 1900, Royal Academician in 1915 and Senior Royal Academician in 1922. In addition to exhibiting over 200 works at the Royal Academy he showed 73 at the Royal Society of Arts and 181 at the Fine Art Society. He also exhibited at the Royal College of Art and the Tate Gallery. The renowned artist-critic, Sickert made Farquharson the subject of an essay comparing him favorably with Courbet. He extolled Farquharson's tension and realism and criticized the pretension of his polar opposites, the Bloomsbury Group, whose writ he said "fortunately does not run in the North of Scotland". The remarkable realism of Farquharson's work can be attributed to his desire to work en plein air. This had to be carried out in a unique way which was adapted to the harsh Scottish climate. Farquharson had constructed a painting hut on wheels, complete with a stove and large glass window for observing the landscape. Likewise to achieve as realistic a result as possible when painting the sheep which frequently appear in his snowscapes, he used a flock of "imitation" sheep which could be placed as required in the landscape of his choice. Farquharson painted so many scenes of cattle and sheep in snow he was nicknamed 'Frozen Mutton Farquharson'.

Farquharson inherited the title of Laird in 1918 after the death of his elder brother Robert, a doctor and MP for West Aberdeenshire.

In 2008 the original 1901 painting Beneath the Snow Encumbered Branches was found in a house a woman had bought in the 1960s from a Bond Street dealer for £1,450. The painting was expected earn up to £70,000 at auction. Nick Curnow, a director at the auctioneers, form said that the unnamed seller was moving to a smaller house and would not have room for the painting. In fact it sold for more than twice that estimate to another private collector in Scotland for £147,600.
