= Barbara Kelly (public servant) =

British public servant

Dame Barbara Mary Kelly, DBE DL FRSE FRSGS (born 27 February 1940) is a Scottish civic activist. She is chairman of the Dumfries and Galloway Arts Festival, Honorary President of the Crichton Foundation, and Chair of the Crichton Campus Leadership Group. She is also chair of the Peter Pan Moat Brae Trust.

A past Chair of the Scottish Consumer Council and the Millennium Forest for Scotland Trust, a past Main Board Member of Scottish Natural Heritage and of Scottish Enterprise, Kelly worked for the interests of rural Scotland, founding, to that end, Rural Forum and the Southern Uplands Partnership. She was a member of the Royal Society of Edinburgh's Foot and Mouth Inquiry in 2002. She is a member of the Rural Development Council and is president and Chair of the Galloway National Park Association. She was Equal Opportunities Commissioner for Scotland.

== Memberships ==
A former chairman of the Architects Registration Board, Kelly was named an Honorary Fellow of the Royal Incorporation of Architects in Scotland in 2008. Kelly was also elected a Fellow of the Royal Society of Edinburgh in 2017.

== Honours ==
She was elevated from CBE to DBE in the June 2007 Birthday Honours List for "public service in Scotland".
