= Morven, Aberdeenshire =

Mountain in Scotland

Coordinates: 57.12268°N 3.03222°W

Morven
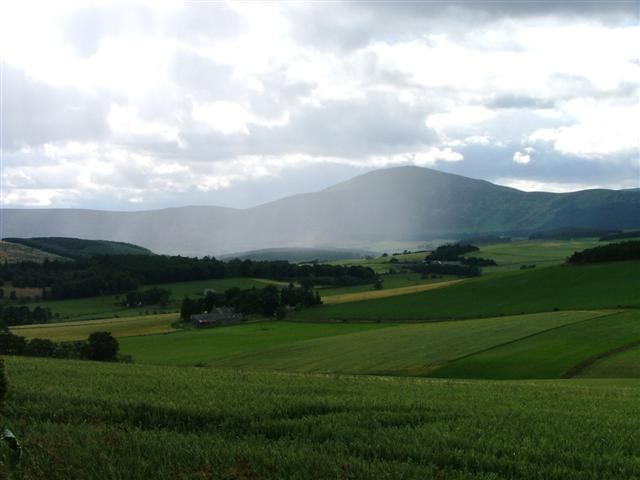

Highest point
- Elevation: 871 m (2,858 ft)
- Prominence: c. 386 m
- Listing: Marilyn Corbett

Naming
- English translation: Big mountain
- Language of name: Gaelic
- Pronunciation: /ˈmɔːrvɛn/

Geography
- Location: Aberdeenshire, Scotland
- Parent range: Grampian Mountains
- OS grid: NJ376040

Morven (Scottish Gaelic: A' Mhòr Bheinn) is a Corbett in Aberdeenshire, Scotland. It is 871 m (2858 ft) high.

The poet, Lord Byron, who spent some of his childhood in the area, mentions the mountain in his poem, When I Roved a Young Highlander:

When I rov'd a young Highlander o'er the dark heath,
And climb'd thy steep summit, oh Morven of snow!
To gaze on the torrent that thunder'd beneath,
Or the mist of the tempest that gather'd below;
Untutor'd by science, a stranger to fear,
And rude as the rocks, where my infancy grew,
No feeling, save one, to my bosom was dear;
Need I say, my sweet Mary, 'twas centred in you?

The Mary mentioned here is Mary Duff, Byron's first love.

The hill gives its name to one of the houses at Aboyne Academy.
