= Hugh de Benin =

- Bishop of Aberdeen
- Church: Roman Catholic Church
- See: Diocese of Aberdeen
- In office: 1272–1282
- Predecessor: Richard de Potton
- Successor: Henry le Chen
- Previous post(s): Chancellor of Aberdeen

Orders
- Consecration: 27 March and 23 July 1272, at Orvieto

Personal details
- Born: Mid or early 13th century Benholm, the Mearns, Scotland.
- Died: 1282; Aberdeenshire, 1282

Hugh de Benin (Benham or Benhyem) (d. 1282) was bishop of Aberdeen. He succeeded Richard Pottock in the see in 1272.

== Name ==
If his name represents Benholm, then he may have come from an English or Anglo-Norman family recently settled in the Mearns (i.e. Kincardineshire), as the name is linguistically English, unusual in settlement names for the area in this period; the other possibility is that the name "Benholm" is an anglicized corruption of a Gaelic name in Beinn, a possibility strengthened by the spellings Benne and Benin found in the cartulary of Arbroath Abbey. He may have been related to the Christiana Benin who married into the Lundie family of Fife.

== Career ==
Hugh chose an ecclesiastical career and by 1266, if not before, he was Chancellor of the diocese of Aberdeen. His career moved forward further in the early 1270s when, after the death of the previous bishop, the chapter and dean of Aberdeen elected him as the new Bishop of Aberdeen. The decree of election was relayed to the pope by Hugh's proctors Thomas de Benin, a likely brother or relative of Hugh and his successor as Chancellor, and Roger de Castello. Hugh was consecrated at Orvieto by Pope Gregory X between 27 March and 23 July 1272.

Shortly after his return to Scotland he was made arbiter of a dispute about tithes between the clergy and the laity of the kingdom, and in a provincial council held at Perth was successful in effecting an arrangement of the difference.

Bishop Hugh was one of the bishops of Scotland attending the Council of Lyons in 1274. Hugh was a trusted figure with both Pope Gregory and Pope Nicholas III, and was appointed several times to judge for the Pope the fitness of different Scottish bishops-elect. He was one of the most active of contemporary Scottish bishops, heading a provincial council at Perth, enjoying a good relationship with the Earl of Buchan, Alexander Comyn, and commencing new work on St Machar's Cathedral.

He died early in 1282 on an island in lacus de Gowlis (Loch Goul, now called Bishops Loch) in the parish of New Machar), where the bishops had their lodging before the canonry was erected. According to Boethius, the bishop died of the cold (catarrho exundate subito interiit), according to another account he choked (suffocatus fuit), and still another by an ambush or to some other kind of treachery (insidiis occubuit).

Hugh de Benin was the author of Provincialium Statutorum Sanctiones and Novæ Episcoporum Prærogativæ.

== Notes ==
Attribution This article incorporates text from a publication now in the public domain: "Benhyem, Hugo de". Dictionary of National Biography. London: Smith, Elder & Co. 1885–1900.

Catholic Church titles
Preceded by Richard de Potton	Bishop of Aberdeen c.1272–1282	Succeeded by Henry le Chen
