= Richard de Potton =

English bishop

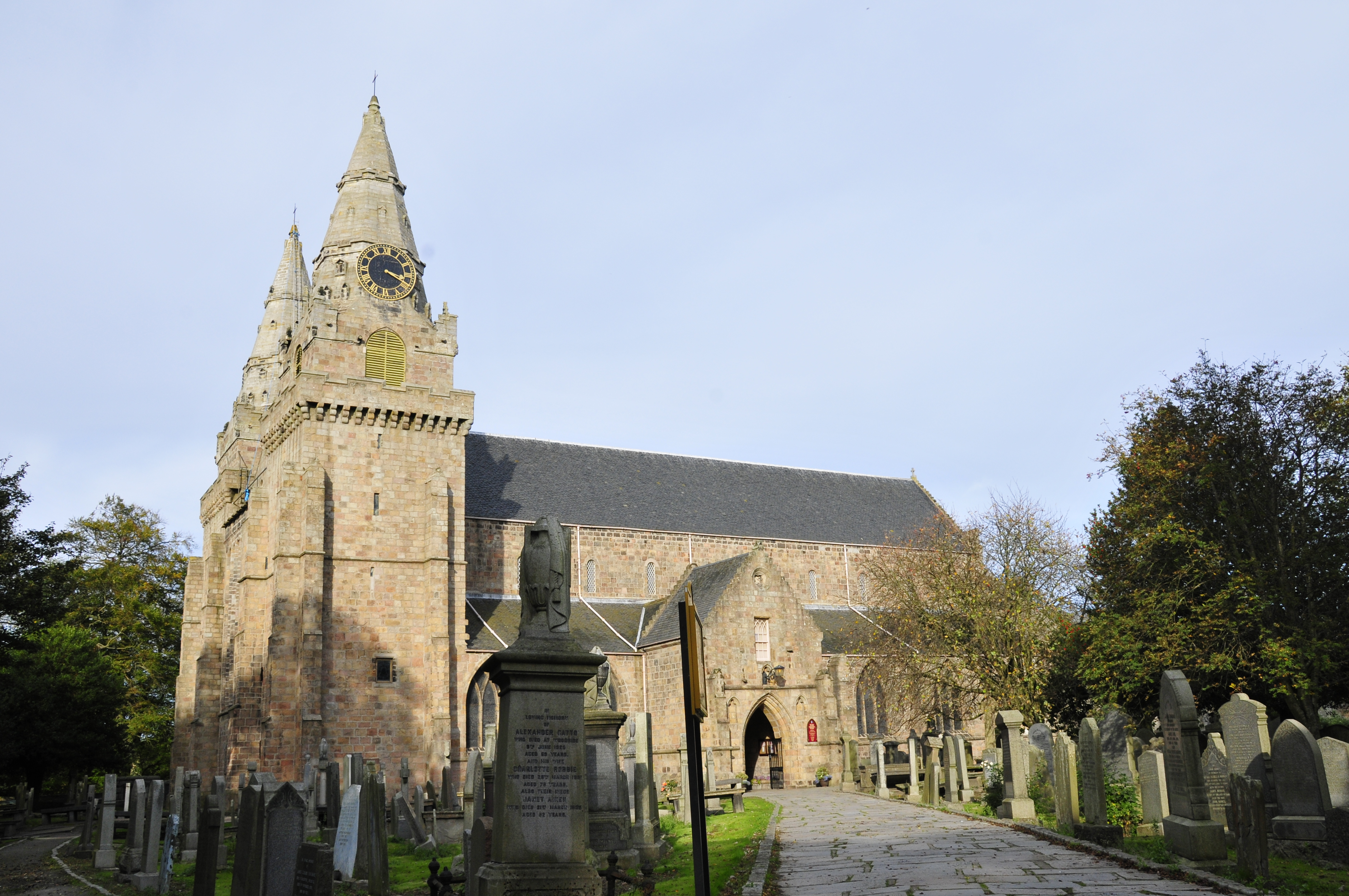
Saint Machar's Cathedral in Old Aberdeen

Richard de Potton [de Poiton, de Pottock, de Poito] was a 13th-century English bishop. His name was likely derived his name from the town of Potton in Bedfordshire, England.

He was chosen in 1256 to succeed Peter de Ramsay, who had just died, as Bishop of Aberdeen. John of Fordun noted that, although an Englishman, he took an oath of fidelity to King Alexander III of Scotland before taking up his bishopric. There are no details of how Potton had managed to get himself in a position to take up such a prestigious post.

Potton's episcopate is rather obscure, though his few years in charge seem to have been very significant ones for the history of the bishopric. He is said in one account to have united the churches of St Mary's and St Machar's into one cathedral, and he is also credited with making the parish church of Crimond into Aberdeen's fourteenth prebend.

Two different dates have been given for his death. Walter Bower states that it was 1270, and the Aberdeen Registrum gives 26 April 1272. His successor Hugh de Benin was consecrated in the summer of the latter year.

Religious titles
Preceded by Peter de Ramsey	Bishop of Aberdeen; 1256–1270 x 1272	Succeeded by Hugh de Benin
