= Radulf de Lamley =

Scottish monk

Radulf de Lamley [Ralph, Ranulf, Randalph de Lambley] (died 1247) was a 13th-century monk and cleric. Radulf's youth is obscure, and it is not until the 1220s that he emerges in the sources as a Tironensian monk, now Abbot of Arbroath. He held the leadership of Arbroath Abbey until 1239, when he was chosen to succeed Gilbert de Stirling as Bishop of Aberdeen.

According to Hector Boece, he was selected purely on merit and maintained his ascetic life after becoming a bishop. This apparently included increasing the asceticism of the cathedral clergy, retaining the light diet of the monk and making his episcopal visitations on foot. Among the notable acts of his episcopate, he exempted the churches owned in corporation by the chapter from episcopal dues and confirmed the grants made by his predecessor bishops. He also excommunicated the murderers of Padraig, Earl of Atholl (d. 1241).

He died in the year 1247, sometime before 13 May when his successor Peter de Ramsay received a papal mandate for consecration.

Religious titles
Preceded by Gilbert	Abbot of Arbroath; 1225–1239	Succeeded by Adam
Preceded by Gilbert de Stirling	Bishop of Aberdeen; 1239–1247	Succeeded by Peter de Ramsay
