= Rural Development Council =

The Rural Development Council was an advisory body to the Scottish Cabinet Secretary for Rural Affairs and the Environment, Richard Lochhead MSP. Its members include: Barbara Kelly; Donald MacRae of the Bank of Scotland; Stuart Housden, the Director of RSPB Scotland; Derek Logie of the Rural Housing Service; Liberal Democrat Councillor Alison Hay from Argyll and Bute Council; Kate Braithwaite, Director of the Carnegie UK Trust Rural Programme; Alex Walker, chairman of Development Trusts Association Scotland; Shiela Garson from Shapinsay Development Trust; Neil Macleod, the chair of the Scottish Crofting Foundation, Jim McLaren of NFU Scotland; and Liam Beattie, a student from the University of Stirling. The council was formed in 2008 and has met in Dumfries, Dunkeld and Finzean.

Mr Lochhead has said:

"I am delighted to see that we now have a forum where the rural voice can be heard at the heart of Government."

In 2010 the council launched a consultation paper called "Speak Up for Rural Scotland". The consultation seeks views on "how best rural Scotland can contribute to the nation's sustainable economic growth", noting the potential of the natural assets of rural Scotland and identifying priorities and opportunities. These are listed as 37 "step changes" which the Council considers important.

The Council met for the last time in February 2011
