= Gregory of Brechin =

Bishop of Brechin

Gregory Gregoir
- Bishop of Brechin
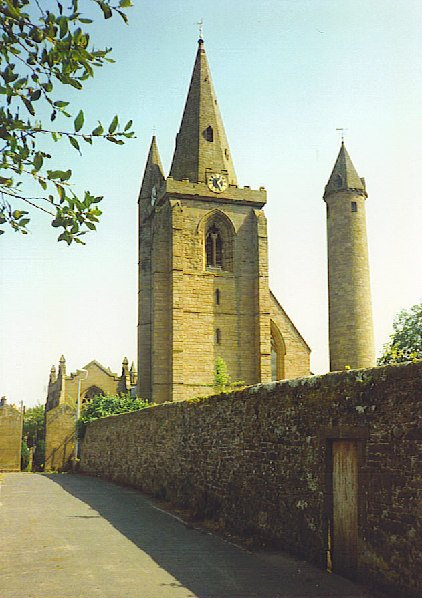
- Brechin Cathedral with "Irish" round tower
- See: Brechin
- In office: 1218–1242x1246
- Predecessor: Hugh
- Successor: Albin
- Previous post(s): Archdeacon of Brechin

Personal details
- Born: 12th century unknown
- Died: 1242 x 1246 unknown

Gregory of Brechin (died 1242x1246) was a 13th-century prelate based in the Kingdom of Scotland.

Gregory's name appears for the first time in an Arbroath Abbey document dating between 1189 and 1198, when he is holding the office of Archdeacon of Brechin. He is the first known archdeacon in the diocese of Brechin. Following the death of Bishop Hugh in 1218, he is elected Bishop of Brechin; the papacy issued a mandate to the bishop of St Andrews for his confirmation and consecration on 15 December 1218.

Gregory is found as a papal judge-delegate in 1219, 1224 and 1225. He was present at the royal council in Forfar in 1225, and at Dundee in 1230. He appears in another Arbroath document dating to 1242, his last appearance in contemporary sources.

During Gregory's time the cathedral was run by Scottish priests called Céli Dé, governed until at least the early part of Gregory's episcopate by a prior named Máel Brigte (Mac Léoit, "MacLoud"). The old abbots of Brechin were in the process of becoming the secular Mac in Aba (filius Abbe, "MacNab") lords of Glen Esk. Soon after Gregory's death these priests "by change of name" came to be "styled as canons". Gregory may have been responsible for this nominal change.

Gregory died sometime between his last appearance in 1242, and 1246 when the papacy mandated the confirmation of his successor Albin.

== Notes ==
Catholic Church titles
Unknown	Archdeacon of Brechin; 1189x1198–1218	Succeeded by Adam
Preceded by Hugh	Bishop of Brechin; 1218–1242x1246	Succeeded by Albin
