= Radulf of Brechin =

Bishop of Brechin

Radulphus or simply Ralph was an early 13th-century bishop of Brechin, Scotland. He was elected to the bishopric as early as 1198 or 1199 when he appears as "bishop of Brechin" witnessing the nativity of the future king Alexander II. He may have been elected before that, for he was "elect" in the time of Gilbert, Prior of St Andrews, who was prior between 1196 and 1198. Radulphus was consecrated in 1202. His one notable action was the granting of the church of "Glenylif" to Cambuskenneth Abbey. His death date is not known, but occurred before 1214 when his successor, Hugh appears for the first time.

Religious titles
Preceded by Turpin	Bishop of Brechin fl. 1196x1214	Succeeded by Hugh
