= Strachan, Aberdeenshire =

Coordinates: 57.02048°N 2.53855°W

Strachan
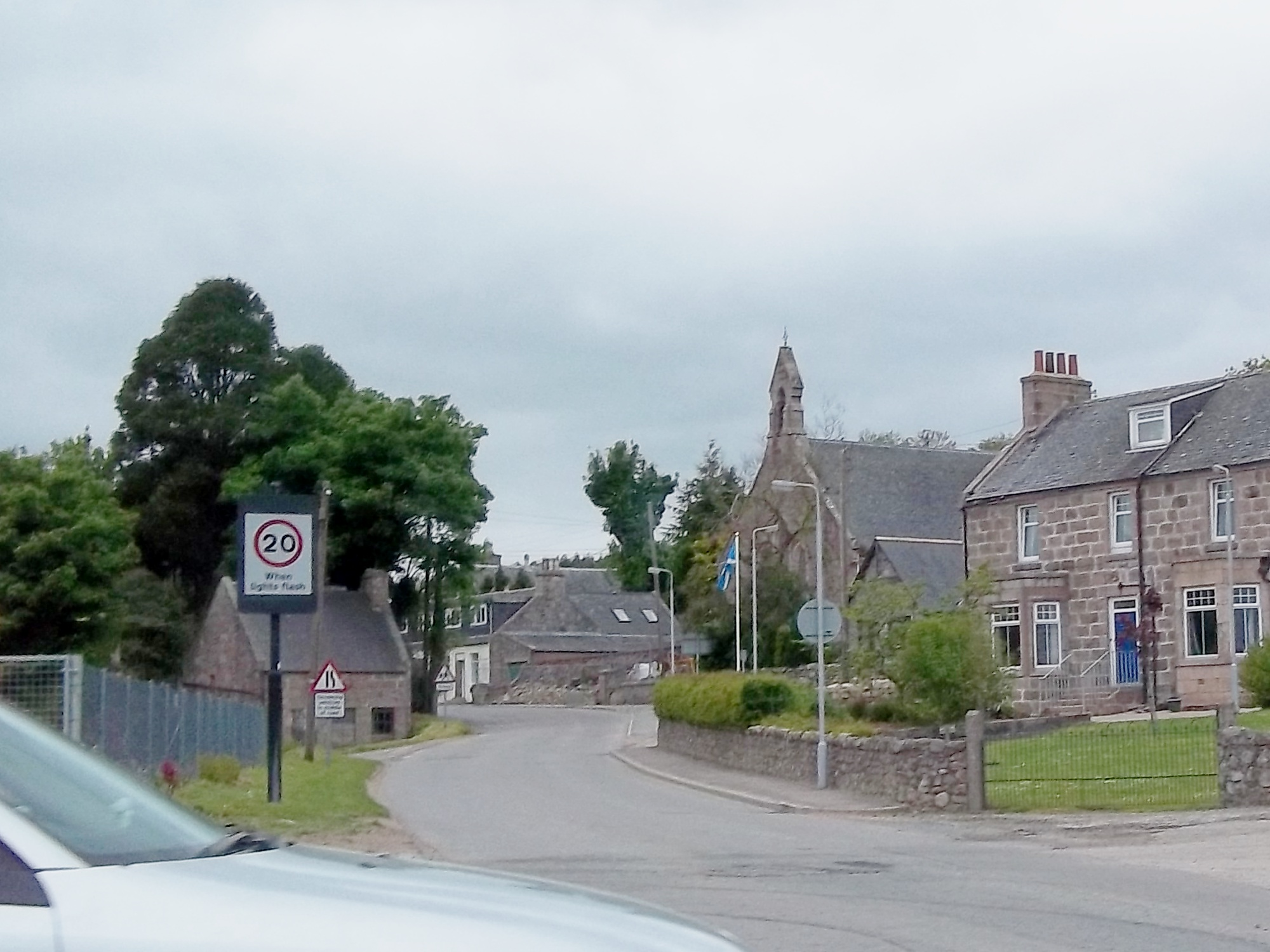
- Strachan village, view looking west

- Location within Aberdeenshire
- OS grid reference: NO674922
- Council area: Aberdeenshire
- Lieutenancy area: Kincardineshire
- Country: Scotland
- Sovereign state: United Kingdom
- Post town: BANCHORY
- Postcode district: AB31
- Dialling code: 01330
- Police: Scotland
- Fire: Scottish
- Ambulance: Scottish
- UK Parliament: West Aberdeenshire and Kincardine
- Scottish Parliament: Aberdeenshire West

Strachan (/strɔːn/ STRAWN) is a village in Aberdeenshire, Scotland that lies along the Water of Feugh, a tributary of the River Dee, Aberdeenshire, a few miles southwest of Banchory.

The village of Strachan is located in the Grampian Highlands of Scotland, about 20 miles southwest of Aberdeen. Its name is derived from the Scottish Gaelic word strath meaning broad valley and aan (pronounced "awn") like lawn.

To the northeast of the village is Scolty Hill, best known for the 20m tall tower monument, built in 1840 as a memorial to General Burnett who fought alongside the Duke of Wellington.

To the south, the B974 road crosses the river and heads over the mountain pass of Cairn o' Mount on its way to the village of Fettercairn.

== See also ==
- Archdeacon of Brechin
- Clan Strachan
- Corsedardar Hill
