= Birsemore =

Coordinates: 57.0677°N 2.7846°W

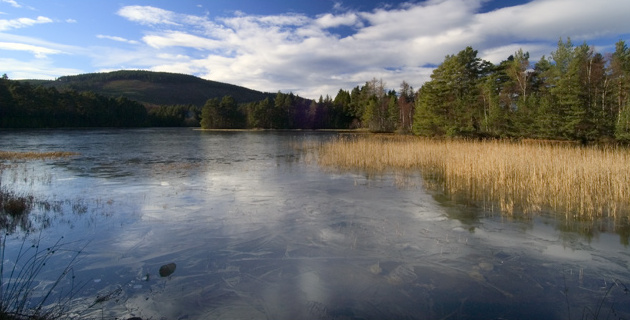
- The Queen's Loch, Birsemore

- Location within Aberdeenshire
- OS grid reference: NO5297
- Council area: Aberdeenshire
- Lieutenancy area: Aberdeenshire
- Country: Scotland
- Sovereign state: United Kingdom
- Police: Scotland
- Fire: Scottish
- Ambulance: Scottish
- UK Parliament: West Aberdeenshire and Kincardine
- Scottish Parliament: Aberdeenshire West

Birsemore is a village in Aberdeenshire, Scotland opposite Aboyne on the River Dee.
