= Archdeacon of Brechin =

The Archdeacon of Brechin was the only archdeacon in the diocese of Brechin, acting as a subordinate of the Bishop of Brechin. The archdeacon held the parish church of Strachan as a prebend from at least 1274.

== List of archdeacons of Brechin ==
The following is a list of known historical archdeacons:

- Gregory, 1189 x 1198–1218
- Adam, 1242–1264
- William de Cresswell, 1284–1285 x 1294
- John de Kininmund, 1295–1298
- Hugh de Selkirk, c. 1309–1309 x 1320
- Laurence de Haddington, 1324 x 1327
- Dáibhidh de Mar, 1342–1344
- Domhnall de Mar, 1344–1349
- Laurence de Erroll, 1351–1352x1367
  - William de Greenlaw, 1352–1353
- Laurence de Spens, 1363 x 1367–1369
- Stephen de Cellario, 1369–1383
- Cuthbert Henryson, 1383–1387
- Robert de Cardeny, 1391
- Thomas Stewart, 1391–1393
- William de Ramsey, 1395
- David de Idvy, 1397–1420 x 1425
- Henry Ogilvie, 1425
- Richard de Crag, 1426–1428
- Gilbert Forrester, 1425 x 1428–1462
- William Fechet, 1438
- David Haddow, x 1448
- David Stewart, 1448
- Richard Wylie, 1458–1467
- William Lawrie, 1467–1490
- David Pitcairn, 1500–1552
- James Pitcairn, 1551–1564 x 1565
- Arthur Erskine, 1563
- David Erskine, 1565–1611
- Thomas Burnett, 1608–1637

== See also ==
- Bishop of Brechin
