= Léot of Brechin =

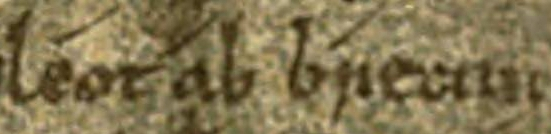
Léot's name as it appears in the Book of Deer.

Léot of Brechin is the first known Abbot of Brechin. He appears in three charters. The first of these is a Scoto-Latin charter recorded in the notitiae on the Book of Deer, a charter which explicitly dates to "the eighth year of the reign of David" (1131) which styles him "Léot ab Brecini". The second of these is a charter of King David I of Scotland, dated by Archibald Lawrie to 1150, granting the lands of "Nithbren" and "Balcristin" to Dunfermline Abbey, where he is called "Leod abbate de Breichin". The third of these is a charter granted by King David to the church of St. Mary of Haddington dating to 1141 mentions a "Leod de Brechin".

He was almost certainly the father of the first known Bishop of Brechin, Samson.

== Notes ==
Religious titles
Preceded by ?	Abbot of Brechin fl. 1131x1150	Succeeded by Samson (as Bishop)
