= Corsedardar Hill =

Mountain landform in Scotland

Coordinates: 57.0375°N 2.6591°W

Corsedardar Hill is a mountain landform in the Grampian Mountains of Aberdeenshire, Scotland. This hill is located in the Lower Deeside region within the historic district of Kincardineshire.

== See also ==
- Strachan
- Nine Stanes
- Water of Feugh
