= Samson of Brechin =

Bishop of Brechin

Samson of Brechin is the first known Bishop of Brechin. He appears as a witness in a charter granted by King David I of Scotland to the community of Deer, recorded in the notitiae in the margins of the Book of Deer. The charter dates to some point between the years 1140 and 1153, although it can probably be pinned down to the year 1150. There certainly was a bishopric of Brechin in 1150, as there exists another charter of King David's, this time granted to the bishop (unnamed) and Céli Dé of Brechin. It is known that Samson was still bishop in the reign of King Máel Coluim IV (1153–1165), appearing as a witness as late as 1165 in a charter of Richard, Bishop of St. Andrews.

Samson was a native cleric of Brechin. He was very likely the son of Léot, an earlier Abbot of Brechin, and father of Domnall, a later Abbot of Brechin. This family story probably explains the origins of the Brechin bishopric, that is, the Bishopric of Brechin, like other Scottish bishoprics, had its origins in the older Gaelic Céli Dé monastic community, and perhaps a hereditary ruling family.

== Notes ==
Religious titles
Preceded by ?	Bishop of Brechin fl. 1150x1165	Succeeded by Turpin
