= Water of Aven =

River in Aberdeenshire, Scotland

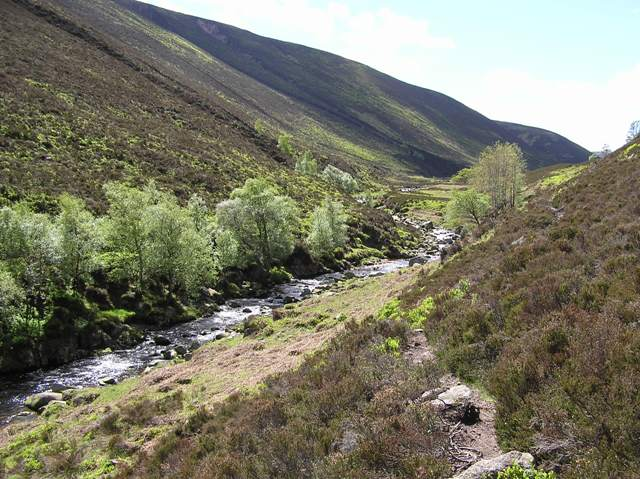
- Water of Aven

Location
- Country: Scotland

Physical characteristics
- Source
  - location: Loch Tennet
- Mouth: Water of Feugh
  - location: Whitestone, Scotland
  - coordinates: 57.01794°N 2.59874°W

The Water of Aven (or A'an) (Scottish Gaelic: an t-Uisge Bàn) is a tributary of the Water of Feugh, itself the largest tributary of the River Dee, Aberdeenshire, Scotland. The Water of Aven rises at Loch Tennet, where the historic counties of Aberdeenshire, Angus and Kincardineshire meet and flows for approximately 15 km to its confluence with the Feugh near Whitestone. The Water of Aven forms the historic boundary between Aberdeenshire and Kincardineshire for its entire length and the lower 4.5 km are designated as part of the River Dee Special Area of Conservation, due to its importance for Atlantic salmon and Eurasian otter.
