= Scolty Hill =

Hill in Aberdeenshire, Scotland

Coordinates: 57°2′9″N 2°31′47″W

Scolty
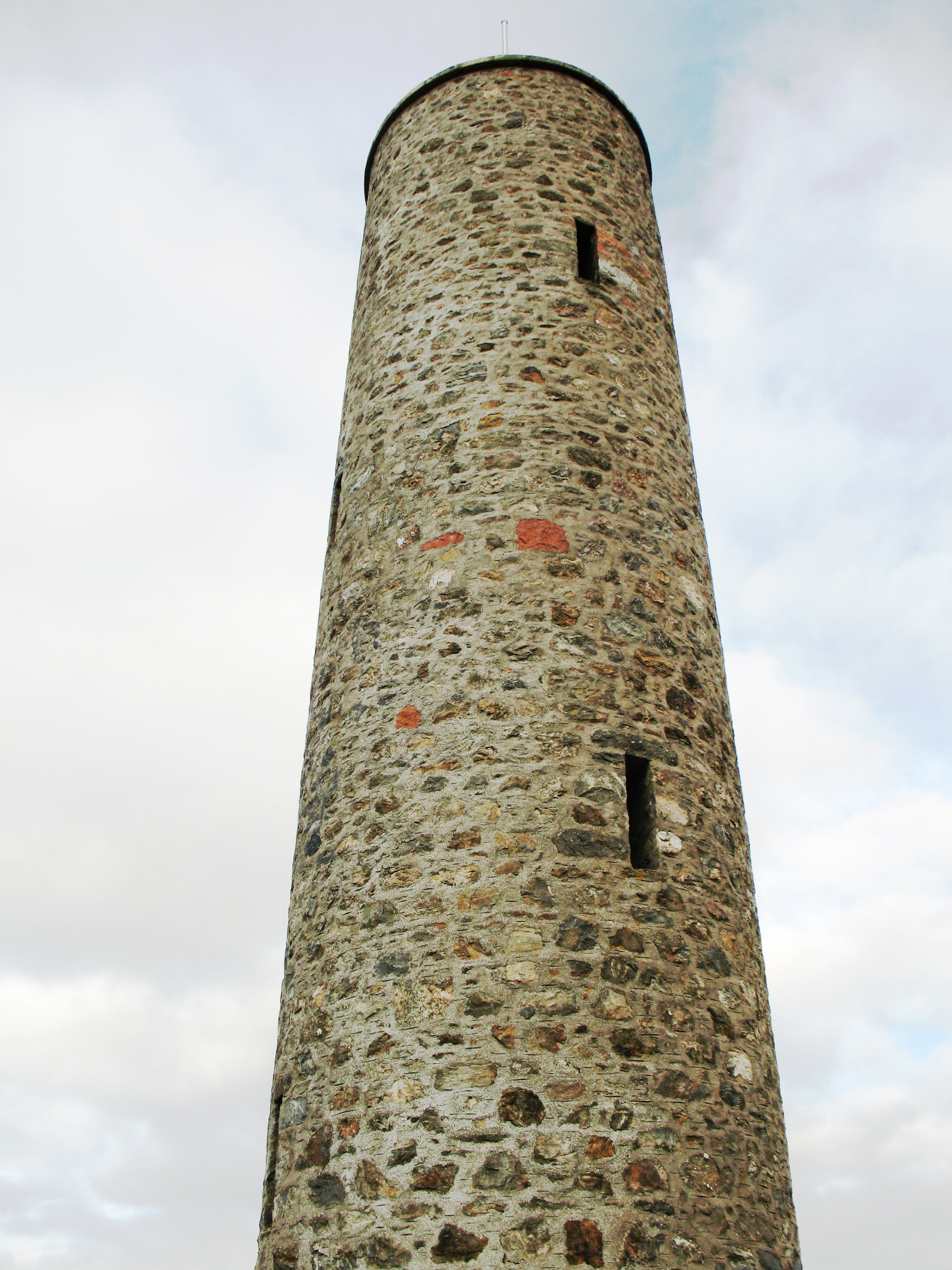
- Tower on top of Scolty Hill

Highest point
- Elevation: 299 m (981 ft)
- Prominence: 45 m (148 ft)

Naming
- Pronunciation: /ˈskoʊlti/

Geography
- Location: Aberdeenshire, Scotland
- Parent range: Grampians
- Topo map: OS Landranger 38

Climbing
- Easiest route: From Scolty Car Park up Land Rover Track

Scolty Hill is a small hill south of the Deeside town, Banchory. Its best known feature is the 20m tall tower monument, built in 1840 as a memorial to General William Burnett who fought alongside Wellington. The tower was restored in 1992 and a viewing platform added by the Rotary Club of Banchory-Ternan. It enjoys splendid views over Banchory, the Dee Valley and the Grampian Mountains, which surround the hill. This encourages thousands of visitors each year. It is popular for tourists, locals, and mountain bikers.

Part of the hill is owned by the Forestry Commission, the other part is owned by local landowner Ron Middleton.

Recent forestry work has meant that many visitors are not allowed on some paths for safety purposes. However, once this is completed the Scolty Woodland Park Association plan on recreating some of the paths on the hill and local mountain bikers also plan on creating a downhill mountain bike track, similar to the one at Pitfichie.

== External sources ==
- Forestry Commission website
- Walking Scotland - Scolty Hill
- Banchory Community Website
- Visit Banchory -Gateway to Royal Deeside
- Banchory Biking
- Rotary Club of Banchory-Ternan
