= Water of Feugh =

Stream in Aberdeenshire, Scotland

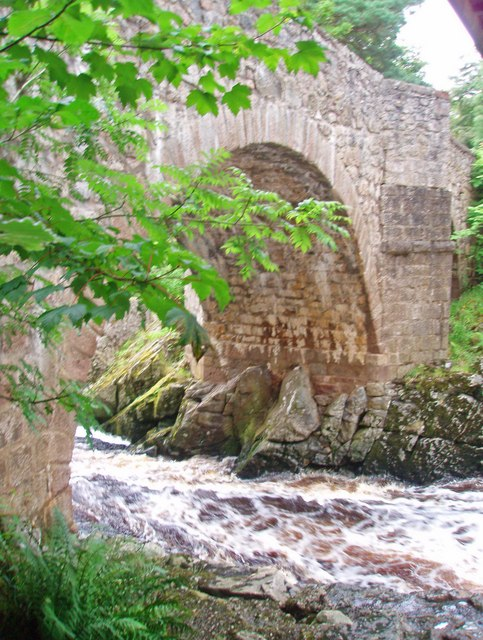
- Water of Feugh cascading below the Bridge of Feugh near Banchory

Location
- Country: Scotland

Physical characteristics
- Mouth: River Dee
  - coordinates: 57.04790°N 2.49154°W

The Water of Feugh, or River Feugh, (/fjuːx/ FYOOKH or /fjuːˈix/ fyoo-IKH) is a stream in Aberdeenshire that is the largest tributary to the River Dee. This stream rises in the Grampian Mountains of Scotland, in an area known as the Forest of Birse, and has a particularly scenic aspect in a series of cascades at the Bridge of Feugh slightly above its point of discharge to the Dee.

== Hydrology ==
The Water of Feugh is a tributary of the River Dee, forming a confluence at Banchory. Classified in the Strahler Stream Order system the Water of Feugh is a second order river, with tributaries including the Burn of Curran and the Burn of Knock. The pH level of the greenish or orange-brown or yellow or magenta waters of the Water of Feugh is slightly alkaline with a pH of 8.19. Summer water temperatures near the mouth run approximately 14.1 degrees Celsius.

== See also ==
- Leuchar Burn
- Water of Aven
