= Lower Deeside =

Area along the River Dee in Aberdeenshire, Scotland

Coordinates: 57.097°N 2.226°W

Lower Deeside is a region along the River Dee in Aberdeenshire and Aberdeen in Scotland. The boundaries of this area are subject to interpretation, since the usage has altered through historic times; however, the area is generally associated with the communities of Durris, Maryculter and Banchory-Devenick in the historic district of Kincardineshire and the communities of Peterculter, Milltimber, Bieldside and Cults in Aberdeen.

== Ancient history ==
Prehistoric habitation of the Lower Deeside is known through archaeological sites such as Balbridie. Roman legions marched from Raedykes to Normandykes, marching through what is now termed the Lower Deeside, as they sought higher ground evading the bogs of Red Moss and other low-lying mosses associated with the Burn of Muchalls. That march used the Elsick Mounth, one of the ancient trackways crossing the Grampian Mountains.
