= Alexander Campbell =

Alexander or Alex Campbell may refer to:

== Politicians and military officers ==
=== Canadian ===
- Alexander Campbell (Upper Canada politician) (1770–1834), farmer and political figure in Upper Canada
- Alexander Franklin Campbell (1845–?), Canadian politician
- Alexander Campbell (Canadian senator) (1822–1892), legislator, minister, lieutenant governor, and senator
- Alexander B. Campbell (born 1933), premier of Prince Edward Island (1966–78)
- Alexander Campbell (Nova Scotia politician) (1826–1909), Scottish-born notary public and political figure in Nova Scotia, Canada
- Alexander Campbell (Newfoundland politician) (1876–1940), physician, fox rancher and political figure in Newfoundland
- Max Campbell (Alexander Maxwell Campbell, 1888–1962), Canadian politician

=== American ===
- Alexander Campbell (Ohio politician) (1779–1857), Ohio politician who served in the United States Senate
- Alexander Campbell (Illinois politician) (1814–1898), member of the Illinois House of Representatives and the United States House of Representatives
- Alexander M. Campbell (1907–1968), Indiana lawyer and Assistant U.S. Attorney General
- Alexander William Campbell (general) (1828–1893), American Civil War Confederate general
- Alexander Campbell (minister) (1788–1866), American Christian reformer

=== British ===
- Alexander Campbell Cameron (1812–1869), known as Alexander Campbell until 1844, MP for Argyllshire, 1841–1843
- Alexander Douglas Campbell (1899–1980), British Army officer
- Sandy Campbell (British Army officer) (Alexander Fraser Campbell, 1898–1940), George Cross recipient
- Alexander Glynn Campbell (1796–1836), MP for Fowey 1819–1820
- Alexander Henry Campbell (1822–1918), British Conservative politician
- Sir Alexander Campbell, 1st Baronet (1760–1824), British general
- Alexander Campbell of Carco (died 1608), Scottish noble and prelate
- Alexander Campbell (1756–1785), British Army officer and MP for Nairnshire
- Alexander Campbell of Possil (1754–1849), military officer
- Alexander Campbell (died 1832) (c. 1750–1832), British Army officer and MP for Anstruther Burghs
- Alexander Campbell (Royal Navy officer) (1874–1957)

=== Australian ===
- Alexander Campbell (sea captain) (1805–1890), whaler and colonist in the Port Fairy region
- Alexander Campbell (Australian politician) (1812–1891), New South Wales politician
- Alexander James Campbell (1846–1926), Australian politician

== Other people ==
- Alex Campbell (actor) (born 1984), Canadian actor and drummer
- Alex Campbell (footballer) (fl. 1926–1929), footballer for Clapton Orient
- Alex Campbell (ice hockey) (born 1948), Canadian former ice hockey player
- Alex Campbell (singer) (1925–1987), Scottish folk singer
- Alex Campbell (golfer) (1876–1942), Scottish golfer and golf course architect
- Alexander Buchanan Campbell (1914–2007), Scottish architect
- Alexander Campbell (journalist) (c. 1883–1961), English newspaper editor
- Alexander Campbell (suspected Molly Maguire) (c. 1833–1877), Irish-born tavern owner, executed in Pennsylvania
- Alexander Campbell (minister) (1788–1866), Religious reformer on the American Frontier
- Alexander Campbell (musician and writer) (1764–1824), Scottish musician and miscellaneous writer
- Alexander Campbell of Carco (died 1608), Scottish prelate, bishop of Brechin
- Alexander Petrie Campbell (1881–1963), Australian-born religious leader
- Alexander Campbell (dancer) (born 1986), dancer with the Royal Ballet
- Alexander Lorne Campbell (1871–1944), Scottish architect
- Whitey Campbell (1926–2015), American football, basketball, baseball, player and coach
- Alexander Campbell (footballer) (1883–?), Scottish footballer
- Alexander Campbell (planter) (1739–1795), Scottish planter and slave owner

== See also ==
- Sandy Campbell (disambiguation)
- Alec Campbell (disambiguation)
- Alasdair Caimbeul (writer) (born 1941), Scottish Gaelic author
- Alexander Hume-Campbell (1708–1760) (1708–1760), Scottish nobleman and politician
- Alexander Campbell Fraser (1819–1914), Scottish philosopher
