= Frederick Cass (died 1861) =

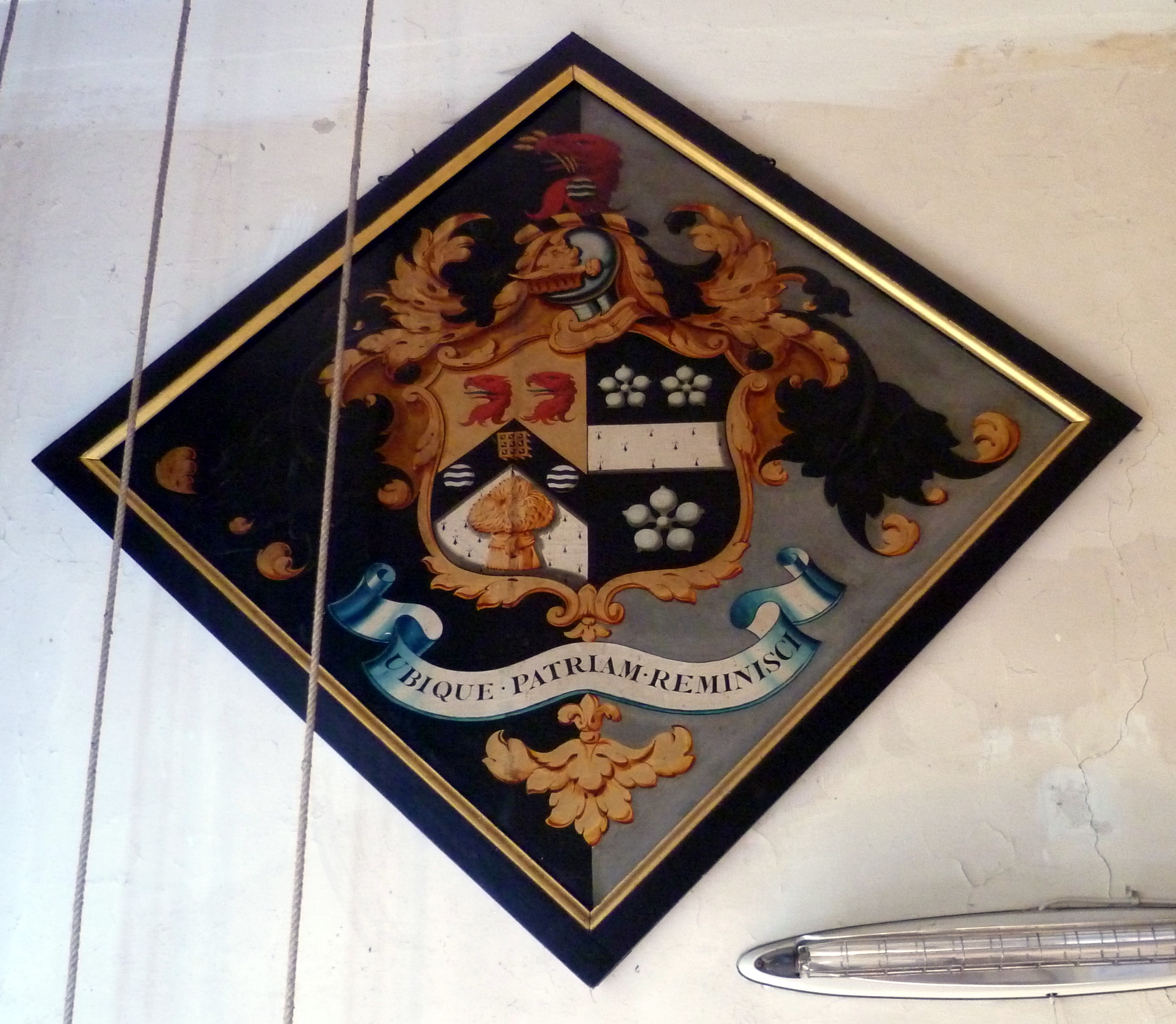
Frederick Cass hatchment at St Mary the Virgin church, East Barnet.

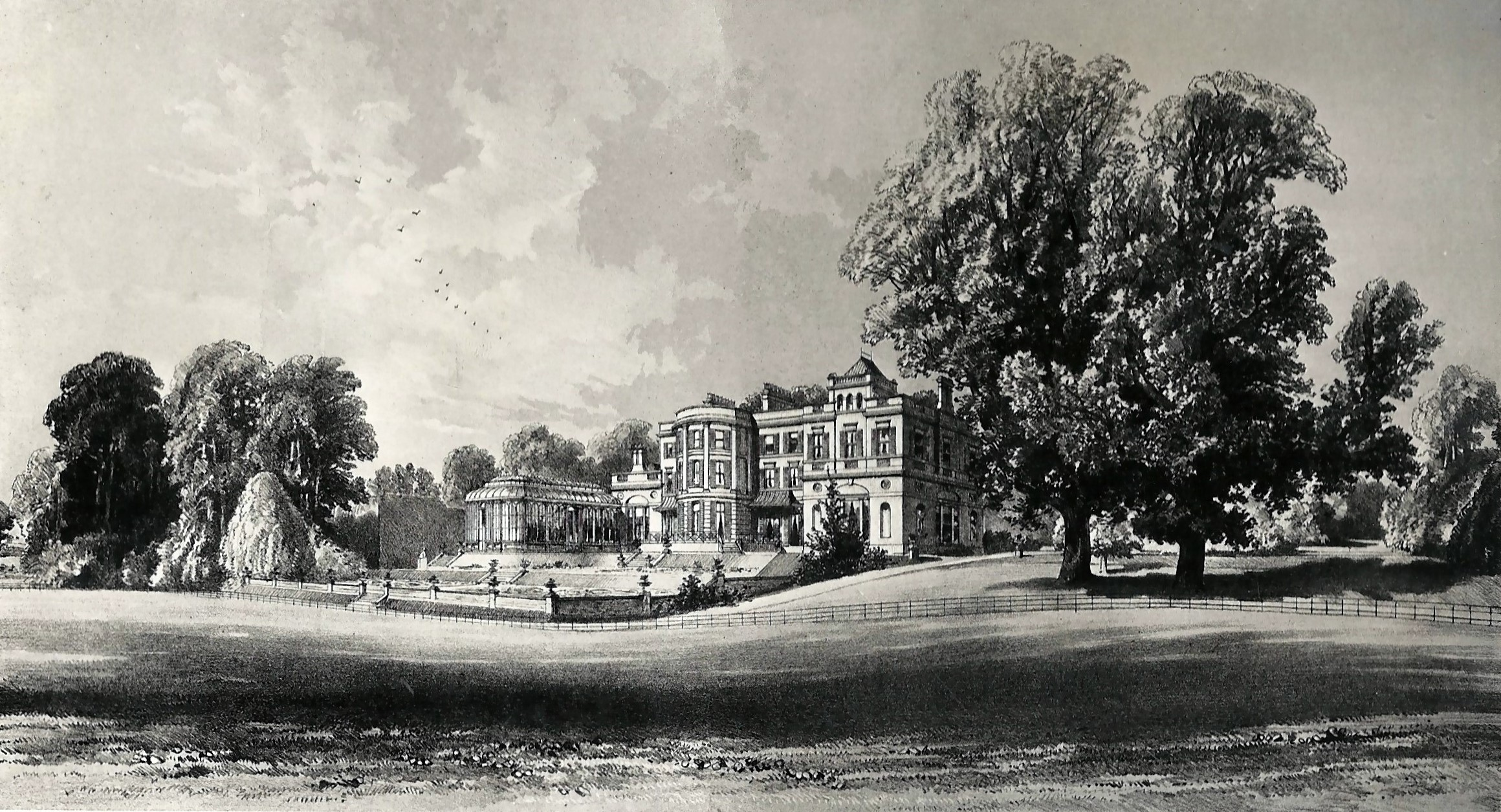
Little Grove, South Front, published by Kell Brothers of Holborn, c. 1860s.

Frederick Cass DL (19 September 1787 – 17 May 1861) was High Sheriff of Hertfordshire, 1844–45. He was resident at Beaulieu Lodge, Winchmore Hill, Edmonton, and later Little Grove, East Barnet.

== Early life ==
Cass was born at Walthamstow on 19 September 1787. His father was William Cass of Beaulieu Lodge, Winchmore Hill, a merchant, and his mother was Elizabeth.

== Appointments ==
Cass was a Deputy Lieutenant, justice of the peace, and High Sheriff of Hertfordshire for 1844–45.

== Personal life ==
Cass married Martha Potter of Ponder's End on 13 March 1823 and the couple had a son Frederick Charles Cass, born at Beaulieu Lodge on 4 September 1824, who was rector of the parish of Monken Hadley in north London and a distinguished local historian. Frederick Cass willed the relevant advowson to his son. Another of their sons, Arthur Herbert Cass, was a Major in the 10th Royal Hussars and fought in the Battle of Chernaya during the Crimean War.

Cass was resident at Beaulieu Lodge, Winchmore Hill, Edmonton, and later Little Grove, East Barnet.

== Death and legacy ==
Cass died on 17 May 1861 and was buried at Tottenham. A funerary hatchment to his memory exists in St Mary the Virgin church, East Barnet.

The Cass family were wealthy. Frederick Cass was able to leave an annuity of £1,000 per annum to his wife on his death and the sums of £10,000 each to his sons' marriage settlements.

Martha died at Chester Terrace, Regent's Park, on 5 July 1870. The Good Shepherd Window at St Mary the Virgin church in Monken Hadley was placed in memory of Martha by her son Frederick.
