= Sigismund Stern =

Cotton merchant in Britain (1807–1885)

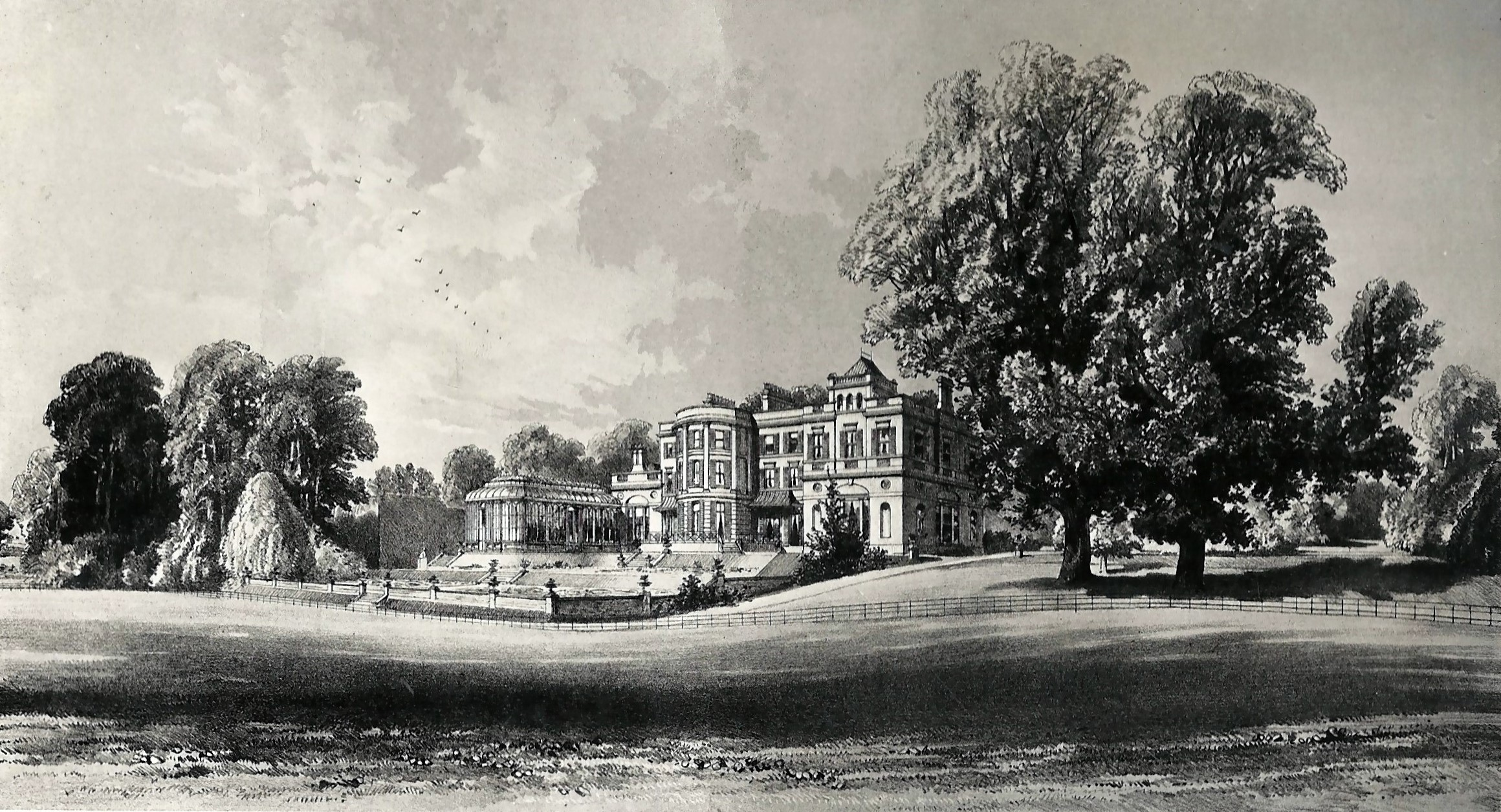
Little Grove, South Front, not long before Stern bought the house. Published by Kell Brothers of Holborn, c. 1860s.

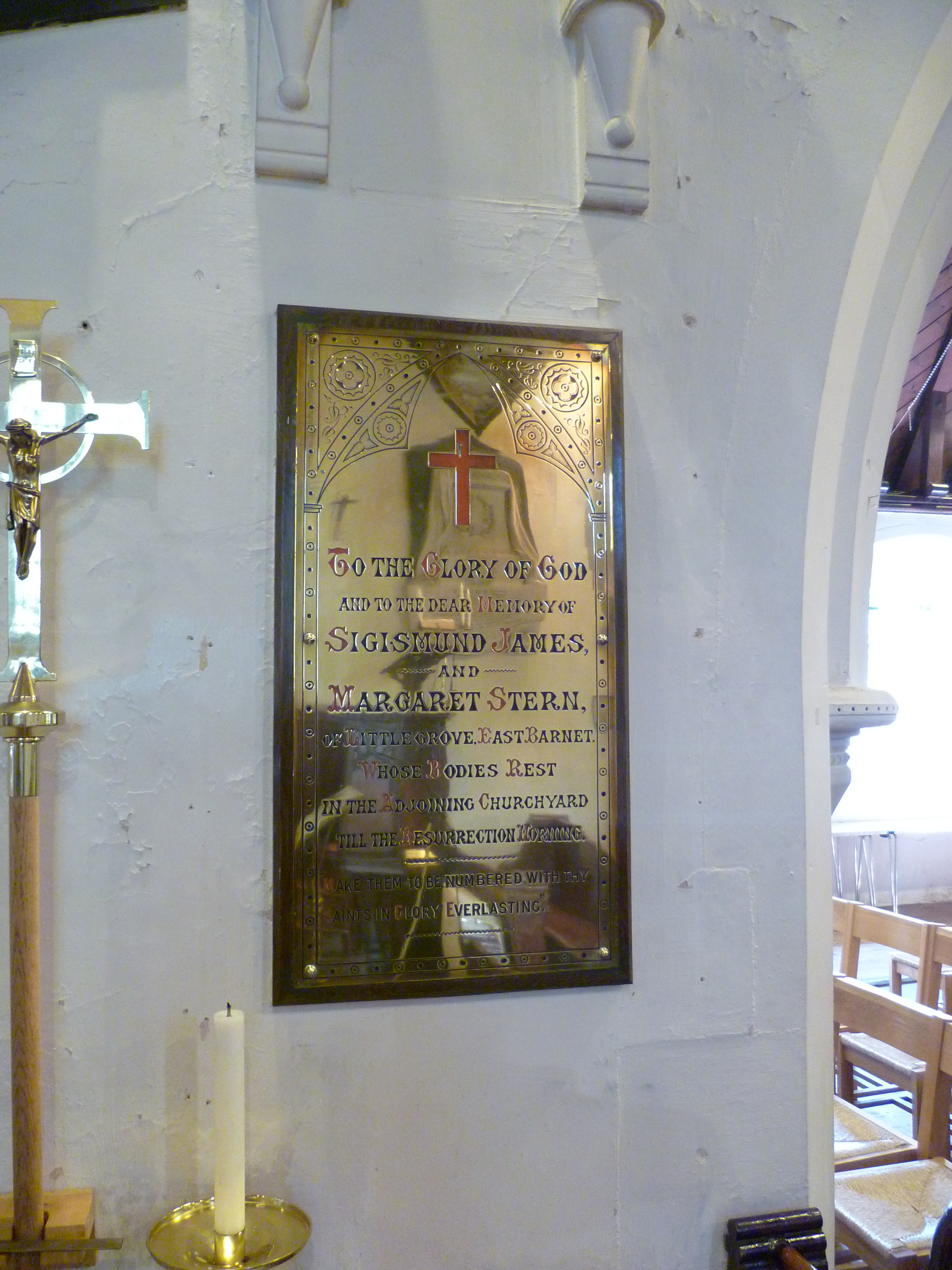
Plaque to the memory of Sigismund and Margaret Stern at St Mary the Virgin church, East Barnet.

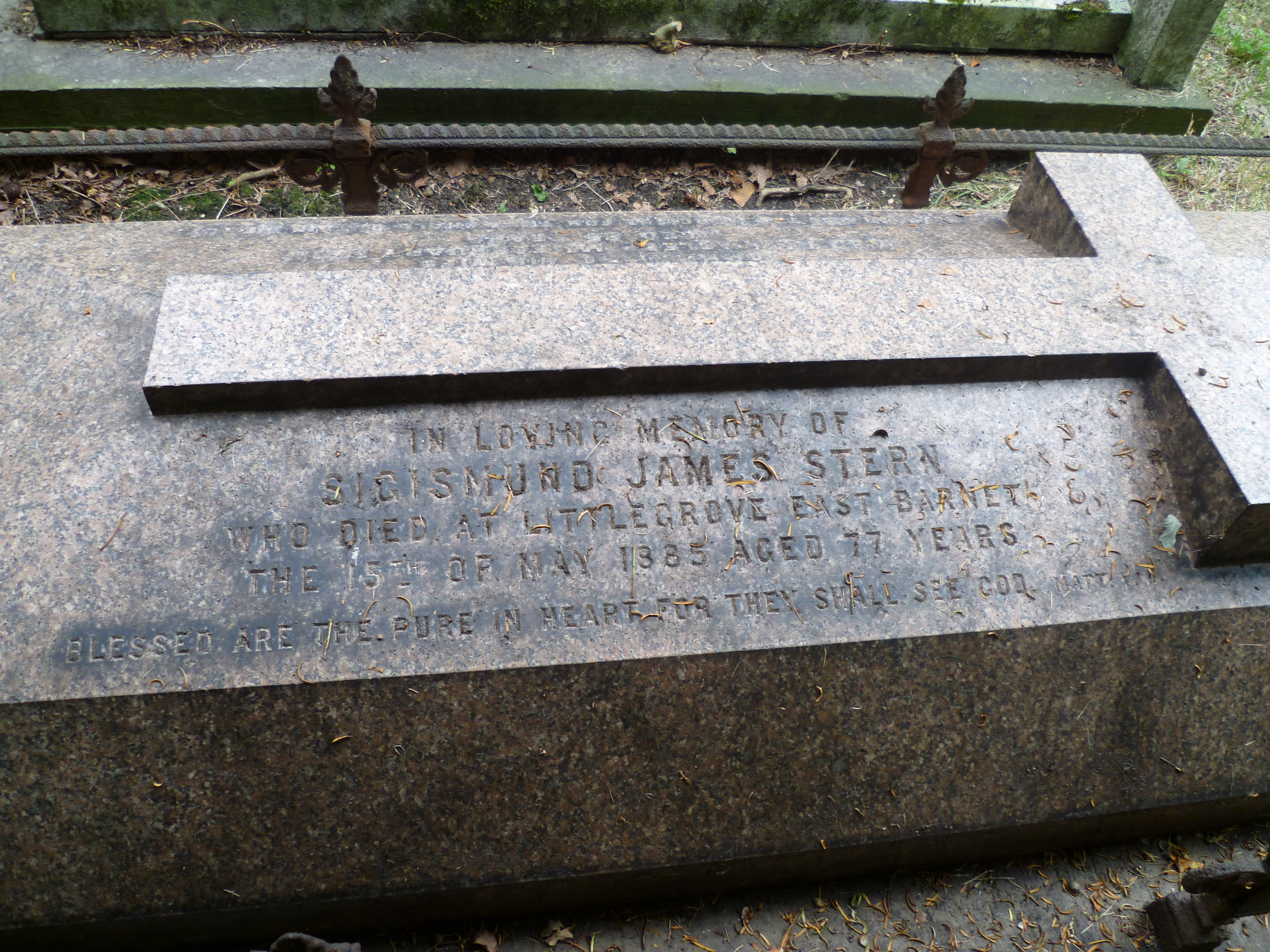
Sigismund Stern's grave at St Mary the Virgin.

Sigismund James Stern (5 December 1807 – 15 May 1885) was a German-born merchant in the Manchester cotton trade. He was later active in banking in London and owned the Little Grove house and estate in East Barnet to the north of the city.

== Early life ==
Sigismund James Stern was born on 5 December 1807 at Frankfurt am Main, the only son of James Stern, merchant of that city.

== Manchester ==
Stern arrived in Manchester around 1830 and in 1842 married Margaret, fifth daughter of Thomas Sharp of that city. There were no children of the marriage.

Not long after his arrival in the city, Stern became a partner in the cotton trading firm of Leo Schuster Brothers & Company, a position he held for nearly 50 years. Stern was also a justice of the peace for Lancashire, one of the first members of the Council of the Cotton Relief Fund, and one of the promoters of the Art Treasures Exhibition at Old Trafford in 1857.

== London ==
In 1855 Leo Schuster moved to London, and formed the merchant bank Schuster Sons & Company in Cannon Street, City of London.

Possibly around the same time, Stern also moved to London. Frederick Cass described him as a "merchant and banker of London" and in December 1871, Stern bought Little Grove house and estate in East Barnet, to the north of the City, from the Conservative party politician Alexander Henry Campbell.

In 1875, he was elected a governor of Queen Elizabeth's School, Chipping Barnet.

== Death ==
Stern died at Little Grove on 15 May 1885. The house continued to be occupied by Margaret Stern until her death. She was buried with her husband at St Mary the Virgin church, East Barnet. Walter Stutters described her as the "Lady Bountiful" of the parish.
