= Arthur Herbert Cass =

British army officer

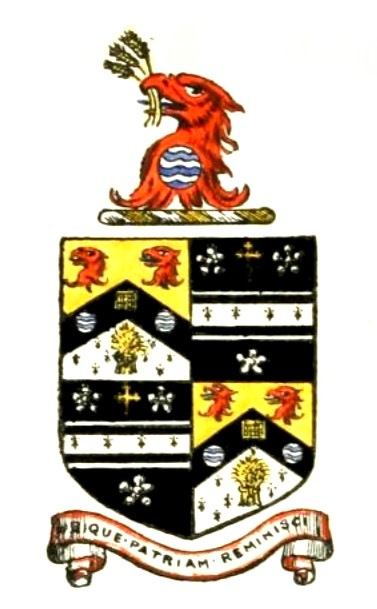
Arms of the Cass family on record with the College of Arms, 1893.

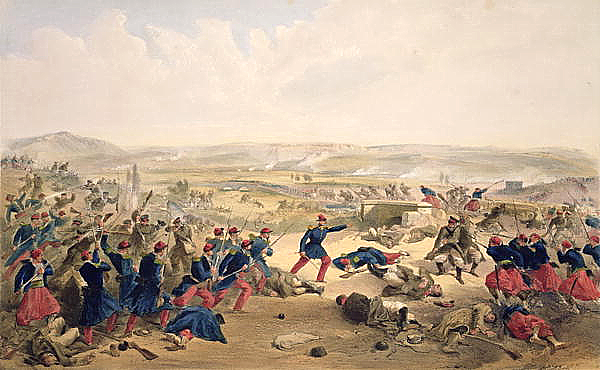
Battle of the Tchernaya, August 16th 1855. William Simpson, 1856. Book plate.

Arthur Herbert Cass (19 July 1828 – January 1905) was a British Army officer of the 10th Royal Hussars who fought in the Battle of Chernaya during the Crimean War, winning the medal and clasp.

== Early life and family ==
Cass was born at Beaulieu Lodge, Winchmore Hill, Edmonton, on 19 July 1828. He was baptised at Edmonton on 18 December 1828. His father was Frederick Cass of Beaulieu Lodge and later Little Grove, East Barnet, where he died on 17 May 1861. His mother was Martha Potter of Ponder's End. She died at Chester Terrace, Regent's Park, on 5 July 1870. His siblings were the clergyman and local historian Frederick Charles Cass, clergyman Charles William Cass, and Martha Adelina Cass (died Little Grove, 1831).

Cass matriculated at Trinity College, Cambridge in 1846.

== Military career ==
Cass joined the British Army in 1850 serving in the 10th Royal Hussars (as it became). He took part in the capture of Tchorguan and the siege and capture of Sevastopol during the Crimean War. He fought in the Battle of Chernaya in August 1855, winning the medal and clasp.

He was promoted from lieutenant to captain in 1858. He obtained his own troop that year. He was promoted to lieutenant colonel in 1873. He retired as colonel in 1881.

== Death ==
Cass died at the Cavendish Hotel in Eastbourne in January 1905.
