= Sandy Campbell =

Sandy Campbell may refer to:

- Sandy Campbell (footballer) (1897–1975), Scottish footballer, see List of Oldham Athletic A.F.C. players (25–99 appearances)
- Sandy Campbell (British Army officer) (1898–1940), British recipient of the George Cross in World War II
- Sandy Campbell (actor) (1922–1988), American actor
- Sandy Campbell (canoeist) (born 1946), American slalom canoeist
- Sandy Campbell (rugby league) (born 1966), Australian rugby league player
- Sandy Campbell (singer), American actress and singer

== See also ==
- Sandra Campbell (disambiguation)
- Alexander Campbell (disambiguation)
