= Sandra Campbell =

Sandra Campbell may refer to:

- Sandra Campbell (beauty contestant), Miss Dominion of Canada
- Sandra Campbell, project co-ordinator on Mario (album) and The Light of the Sun
- Sandra Campbell (writer), see 1938 and 1971 in poetry

== See also ==
- Sandy Campbell (disambiguation)
