= Little Grove =

Former estate in East Barnet

Coordinates: 51.6449°N 0.1534°W

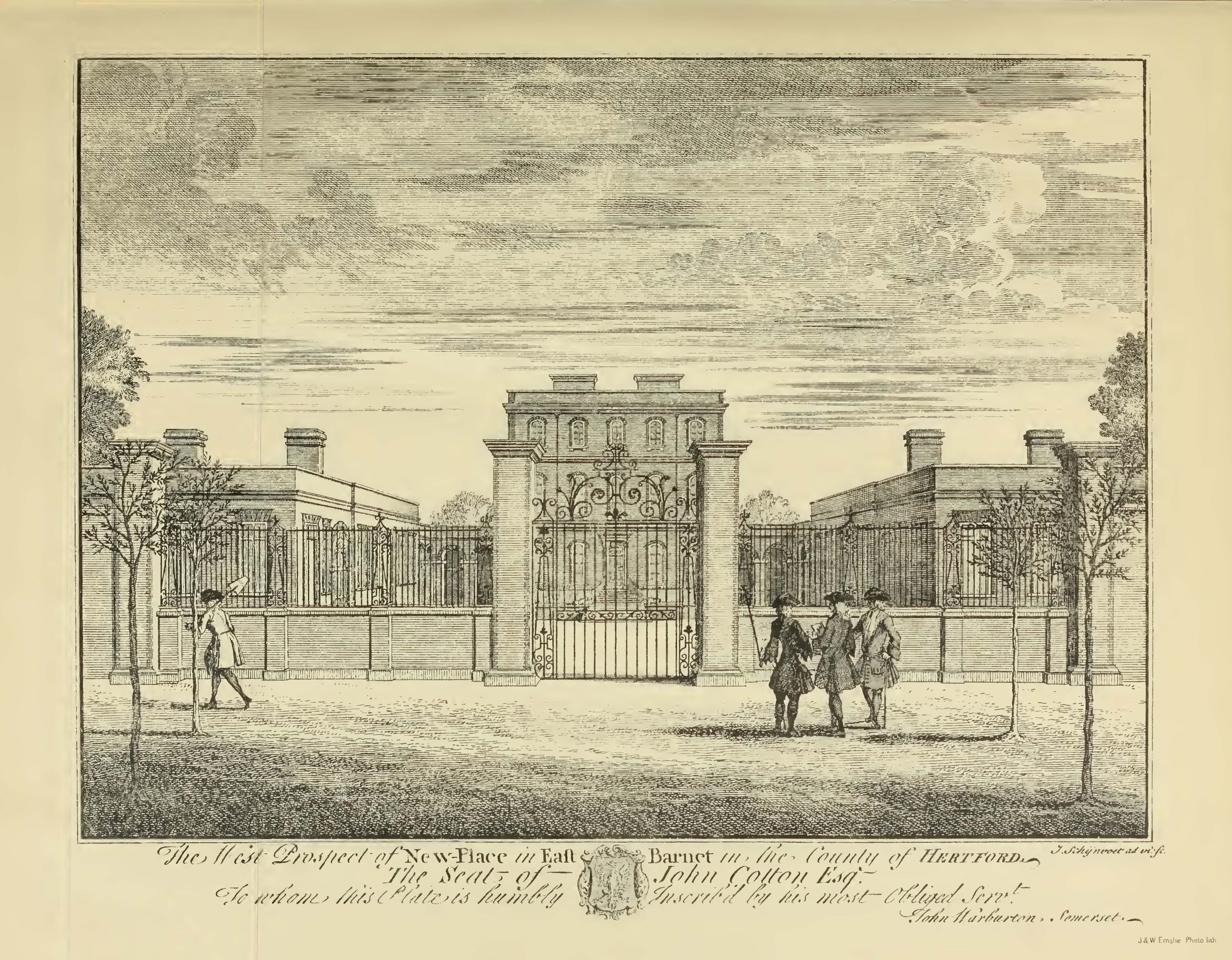
The West Prospect of New-Place in East Barnet in the County of Hertford. A view of the new house built in 1719 that John Cotton named New Place.

Little Grove, originally Danegrove, was a house and estate that once existed in East Barnet on high ground north of London and to the south of Cat Hill. The original house on the site dated from at least the mid-sixteenth century.

In 1719, it was demolished and replaced with a house known as New Place but the property soon returned to the name of Little Grove. That house was demolished in 1932 to make way for a housing development and primary school known as Littlegrove.

== Early history ==
A house had stood on the site since at least the 16th century. David Pam dates the construction of the house to 1553. The court rolls of the manor record that William Copwood of Totteridge disposed of some part of Danegrove, or what it then was composed of, to David Woodroffe, citizen and haberdasher of London (died 1563), who as sheriff oversaw the execution of two protestant martyrs in 1555 and was criticised for the cruelty of his methods. Woodroffe's wife Elizabeth took a life interest in the property following her husband's death but surrendered Danegrove (9 acres) and Daneland (12 acres) to other members of the Woodroffe family.

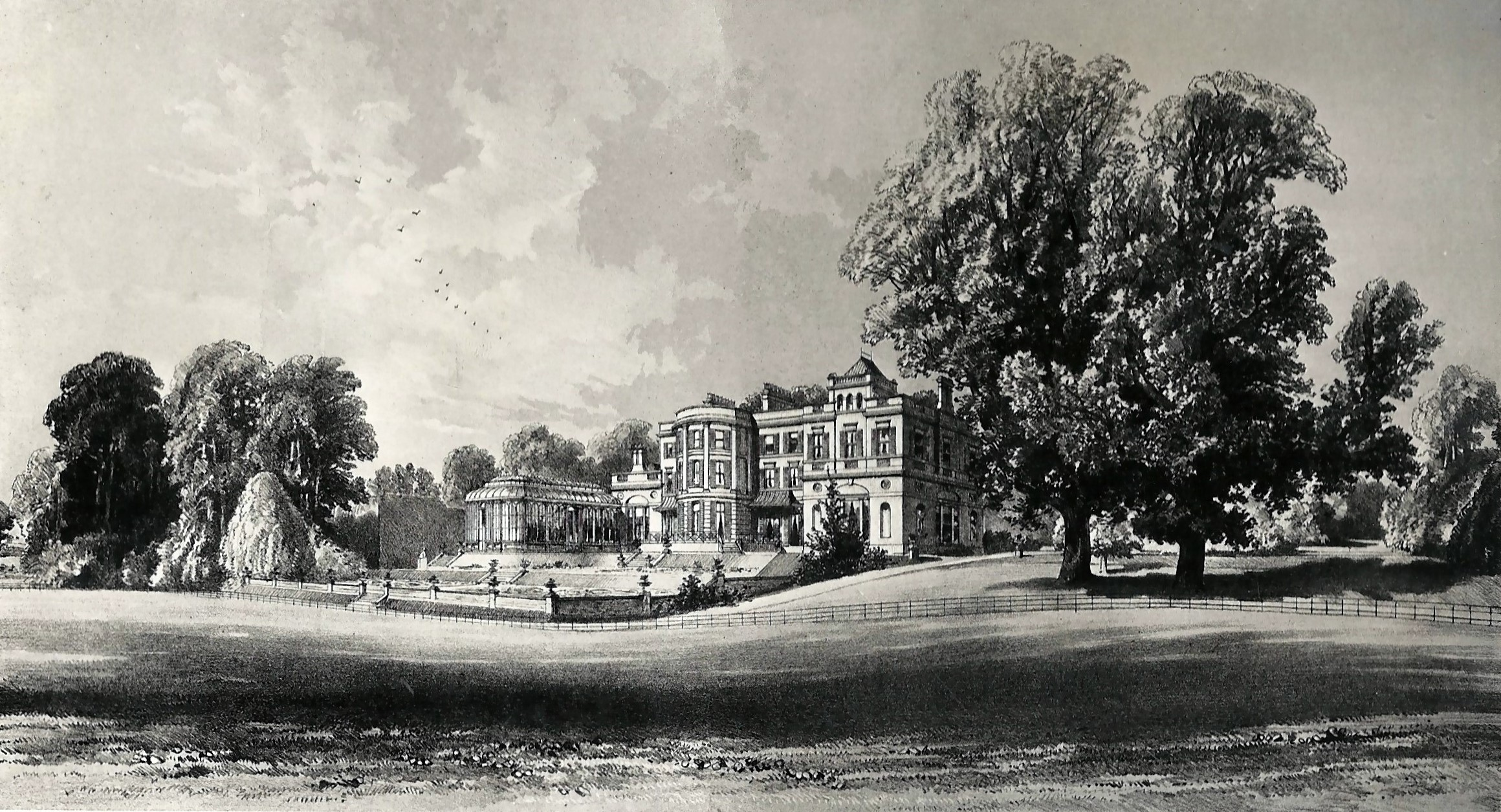
Little Grove, South Front, published by Kell Brothers of Holborn, c. 1860s.

== 17th century ==
In 1610, Sir Christopher Rooper was renting the property and was threatened with a fine of 20 shillings if he did not remove a manure heap his servants had placed on the King's road between Bourn Gate (later referred to as Bohun Gate) and Doggett's Hill. Meanwhile, the estate continued in the ownership of the Woodroffe family who purchased additional lands and made sales of others, such that Frederick Cass argued in the 1880s in East Barnet that the composition of the estate had no consistent identity over time.

Anthony Bouchier, clerk in the Remembrancer's office of the Exchequer, leased part of the estate in the early 1630s. He is mentioned in church records in 1632 and 1633 as "inhabiting Mr. Woodroffe's house".

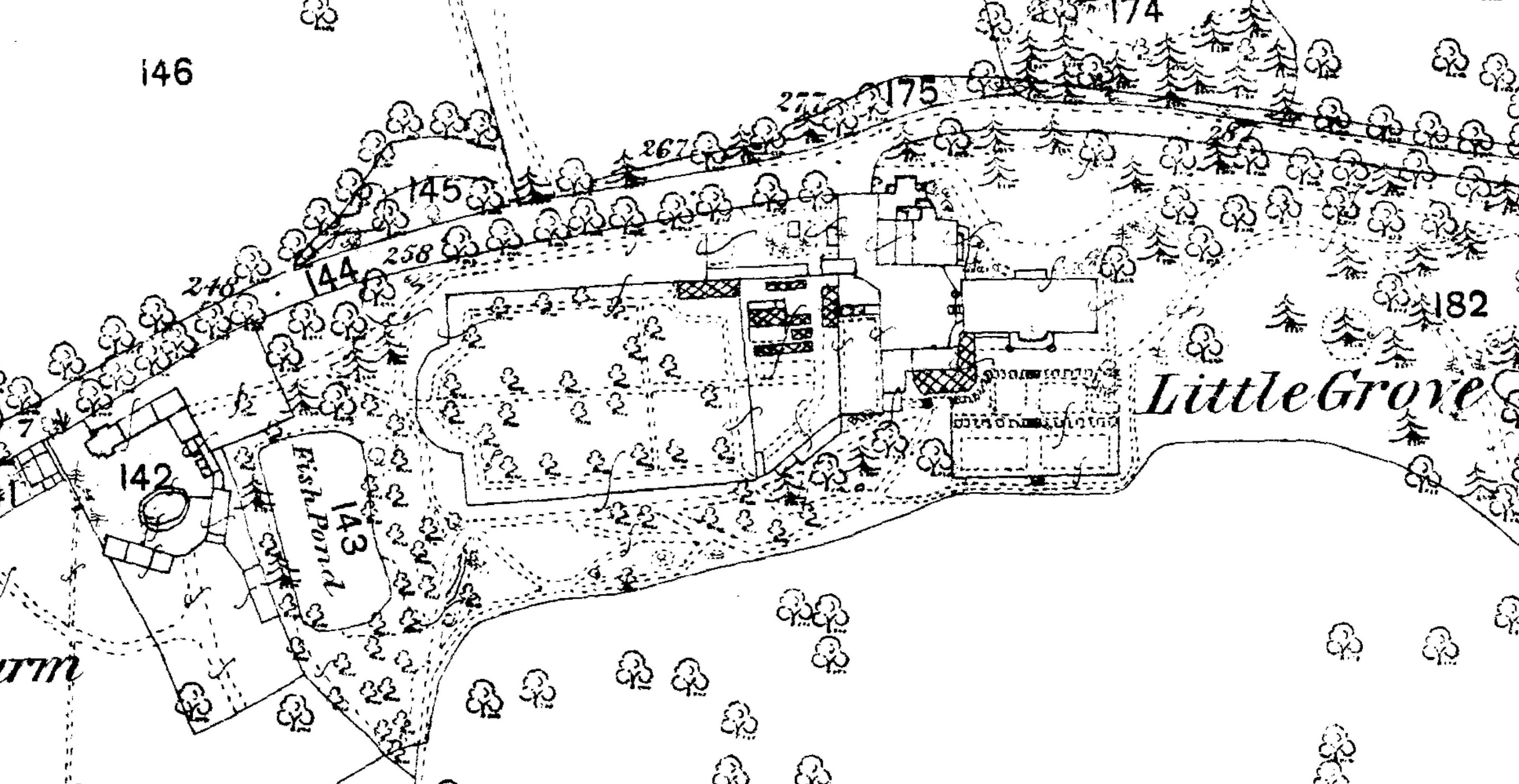
Little Grove on an 1860s Ordnance Survey map.

== 18th century ==
In 1719, the existing Little Grove was replaced by John Cotton of the Middle Temple with a house that he called New Place, but the house and estate soon reverted to the original name.

In 1767, Edward Willes, then Solicitor General for England and Wales, purchased the estate. The landscape gardener, Capability Brown, received £700 from Willes for work carried out at Little Grove in 1768.

A number of closes or meadows were amalgamated by the Willes family to create the estate.

== 19th century ==
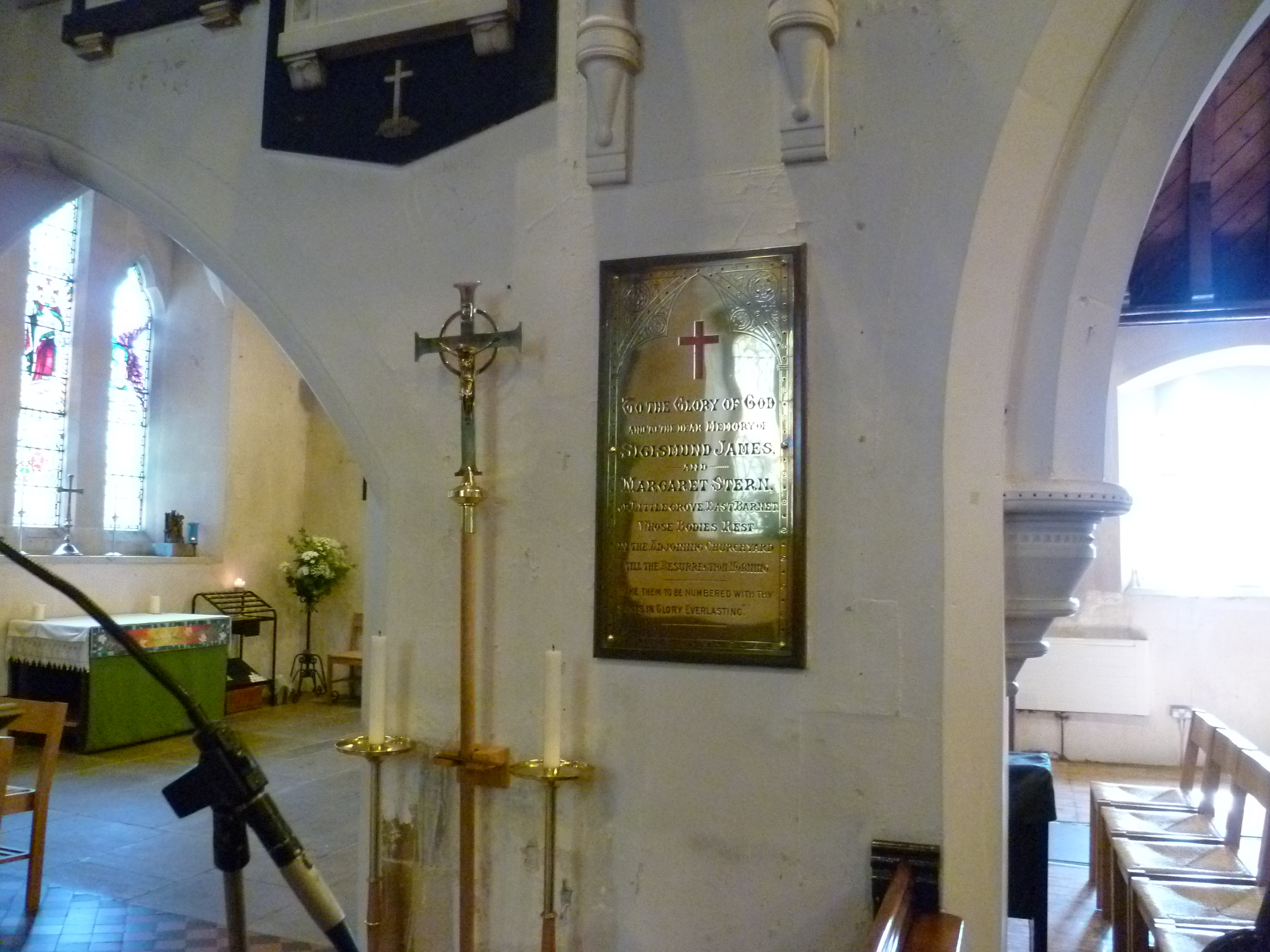
Plaque to the memory of Sigismund and Margaret Stern at St Mary the Virgin church, East Barnet.

Frederick Cass senior, father of Frederick Charles Cass (1824–1896) who wrote East Barnet, lived in the house in the mid 19th century and died there on 17 May 1861.

The house was then bought by the Conservative party politician Alexander Henry Campbell in July 1862. In October 1868, The Times carried advertising stating that the house, having failed to sell at auction, was now available for offers. It was stated to be "a moderate-sized mansion, in the Italian style, with charming terraces and gardens, overlooking a delightful and finely-timbered park, with a model farmery; the whole in perfect order, and extending over about 110 acres".

It was sold in December 1871 to Sigismund James Stern. After Stern's death in 1885, the house was occupied by his widow Margaret, who was buried with her husband at St Mary the Virgin church, East Barnet. She was described as the "Lady Bountiful" of the parish.

== 20th century ==
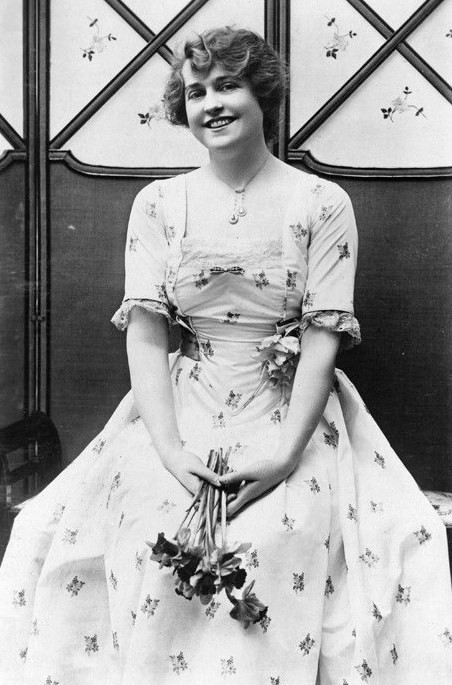
American actress Shirley Kellogg who owned the house from 1921 to 1924.

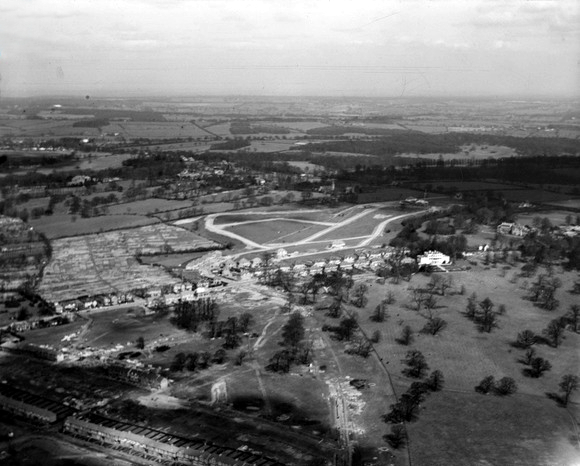
Aerial view of East Barnet looking north towards Cockfosters with Little Grove House on the right (1930)

In January 1912, The Times reported that Little Grove with 112 acres had been sold. From 1921 to 1924 the house was owned by the American actress Shirley Kellogg who was said to have spent £10,000 restoring it, a very large amount of money at that time. The house was known as Shirley Grove during her ownership.

On 21 June 1927, the house was sold again by auction, the advertising noting "pleasure grounds of nearly three acres" and "three exceptionally fine building sites". In August 1931, the house was offered for sale again on behalf of the executors of Mr J.J. O'Brien with the completion of the sale announced in The Times in November that year.

Little Grove was demolished in 1932 to make way for a housing estate. Only the remains of a cottage garden now exist. The house is remembered by the street Littlegrove in East Barnet which runs from Church Hill Road to Eton Avenue but is some distance from the site of the former Little Grove house. Danegrove Primary School (formerly Littlegrove) and the residential street Daneland are near the former site of Little Grove.
