= Thomas Sydserf =

Minister of the Church of Scotland

Thomas Sydserf (1581–1663) was a Scottish minister of the Church of Scotland who served as Protestant Bishop first of Brechin, then Galloway and finally Orkney.

== Life ==
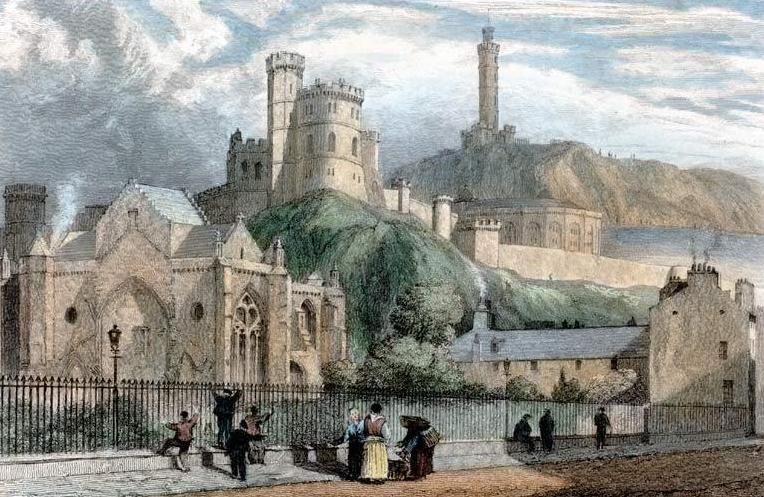
Trinity College Kirk in Edinburgh (bottom left)

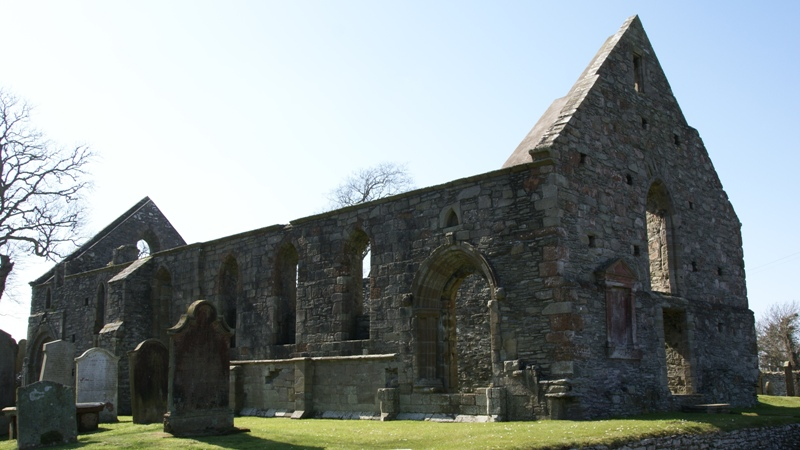
Whithorn Priory

The eldest son of James Sydserf, an Edinburgh merchant, Sydserf graduated from the University of Edinburgh in 1602 before travelling to continental Europe to study at the University of Heidelberg. After returning to Scotland, he entered the ministry, beginning at St Giles' parish, Edinburgh in 1611. 15 years later, in January 1626, he was translated to Trinity College Kirk, Edinburgh, before being promoted to Dean of Edinburgh on 19 February 1634 (based at St Giles Cathedral).

However, in the same year, and on the recommendation of William Laud, Archbishop of Canterbury, he ascended to episcopal rank, receiving consecration as Bishop of Brechin on 29 July. In the following year, on 30 August 1635, he was translated as Bishop of Galloway.

Sydserf was very much a royalist, pro-Episcopacy, and inclined to be highly sympathetic towards Arminianism. These views brought him much conflict in Scotland, and as Bishop of Galloway, he exercised his episcopal powers against his ideological opponents. He supported the introduction in 1637 of an English-style Book of Common Prayer, and for this, he was attacked on several occasions by mobs in Falkirk, Dalkeith and Edinburgh. Some went further and accused him of being a Roman Catholic: he was alleged to wear a crucifix. He was finally deposed by the General Assembly of the Scottish church on 13 December 1638.

Sydserf thereafter went to England, briefly becoming a follower of King Charles I, before moving to continental Europe. He returned to Scotland, and after the Restoration and reimposition of Episcopacy in Scotland, was reinstated as a bishop, though on this occasion becoming Bishop of Orkney. He was the only pre-1638 bishop to be reinstated as a bishop in Scotland after the Restoration. He lobbied hard to be made Primate of Scotland but without success. His willingness to ordain as a clergyman anyone who asked him attracted much criticism, a fact recorded by Samuel Pepys in his famous diary.

Sydserf died in Edinburgh on 29 September 1663 and is buried in Greyfriars Churchyard (location unknown).

Sydserf was responsible for remodelling the nave of Whithorn Priory in line with the new styles of worship he tried to promote.

Although not formally a member of the Hartlib Circle, he was on friendly terms with some of its members including Arnold Boate, who dedicated to Sydserf his memoir of his wife Margaret Dongan. Their friendship was apparently not affected by Boate's closeness to Oliver Cromwell, for whom he is said to have acted as a spy.

== Family ==
In 1624 he married Rachel Byers, the daughter of an Edinburgh magistrate: they had four sons and four daughters, including Thomas junior, a popular dramatist and journalist.

Church of Scotland titles
Preceded by William Struthers	Dean of Edinburgh; 1634	Succeeded by James Hannay
Preceded by David Lindsay	Bishop of Brechin; 1634–1635	Succeeded by Walter Whitford
Preceded by Andrew Lamb	Bishop of Galloway; 1635–1638	Vacant Title next held by James Hamilton
Vacant Title last held by George Graham	Bishop of Orkney; 1661–1663	Succeeded by Andrew Honyman
