= John Sinclair (bishop) =

Scottish bishop (16th century)

John Sinclair (died April 1566) was an Ordinary Lord and later Lord President in the Court of Session. He performed the ceremony marrying Mary, Queen of Scots to Lord Darnley.

== Family ==
He was the fourth son of Sir Oliver Sinclair of Roslin (d. after 11 April 1510) by his spouse Margaret, daughter of William Borthwick, 2nd Lord Borthwick. John was a younger brother of Henry Sinclair, Bishop of Ross, and their sister Margaret was married to Robert Lauder, of The Bass (d. June 1576). In a Precept of Clare Constat (GD122/1/340, NAS) dated 2 May 1566, John [Sinclair], Bishop of Brechin, is referred to as "maternal uncle of Robert Lauder of Popple, knight, heir of Robert Lauder of Bass, and Margaret Sinclare, sister of Robert Sinclare of Over Liberton".

== Career ==
Douglas writes: "Dr.John Sinclair, bred to the church, a man of great piety and learning, and for his extraordinary knowledge of our laws, was first appointed one of the Ordinary Lords of Session, then Lord President 'in his brother's place' [handwritten note in margin]. He was 'Dean of Restalrig near Edinburgh and was' [handwritten note in margin] afterwards preferred to the Bishoprick of Brechin".

Before December 1537 he was Prebendary of Corstorphine. Afterwards, as Rector of Snaw, John Sinclair was admitted as an Ordinary Lord in the Court of Session on 27 April 1540. He was afterwards appointed by King James V, confirmed by a Bull of Pope Paul III dated 27 August 1542, as Dean of the Church of St. Mary of Restalrig, a valuable benefice stated to be £60 sterling. He attended his brother Henry to France in 1564, and brought back with him to Scotland the materials which Henry had amassed for a continuation of Boece's History of Scotland. He also succeeded Henry as Lord President of the Court of Session. Shortly after July 1565 he was promoted to the Episcopal See of Brechin, but did not long enjoy the dignity, dying the following year.

== Marriage of the Queen ==
As Dean of Restalrig, he had the honour of marrying Mary, Queen of Scots to Henry Stewart, Lord Darnley in Holyrood Abbey on 29 July 1565.

== Works ==
There is speculation as to whether the work entitled Sinclair's Practicks should be attributed to him or his brother Henry. There are two manuscript copies of this work preserved in the Advocates' Library in Edinburgh, and one of them is stated by Ruddiman, in an Introductory Note, to have been transcribed from the original MSS, then in the possession of Lord Pitmedden. The decisions commence on 1 June 1540 and are continued until 28 May 1549.

== Death ==
In April 1566 the Bishop of Brechin "was seized with fever", and died. In a long "Instrument" dealing with the disputed redemption of property, in favour of Robert Lawder of Popple, knight, dated 9 May 1573, Sir Robert is referred to specifically as "heir of Mr.John Sinclair, Dean of Restalrig".

Religious titles
Vacant Title last held by Domhnall Caimbeul	Bishop of Brechin; 1565–1566	Succeeded by Alasdair Caimbeul
