= Andrew Lamb (bishop) =

Minister of the Church of Scotland and Bishop

The Right Reverend Andrew Lamb
- Bishop of Galloway
- Church: Church of Scotland
- See: Diocese of Galloway
- In office: 1619–1634
- Predecessor: William Couper
- Successor: Thomas Sydserf
- Previous posts: Bishop of Brechin (1607–1619); Minister of Burntisland (1593–1596); Minister of Arbroath (1596–1600); Minister of South Leith (1600–?)

Orders
- Consecration: 21 October 1610 by George Abbot

Personal details
- Born: c. 1565 Scotland
- Died: 1634

Andrew Lamb (1565? – 1634), was Bishop of Brechin and Bishop of Galloway.

== Life ==
He was probably son or relative of Andrew Lamb of Leith, a lay member of the General Assembly of 1560. The latter purchased the late Mary of Guise's Leith "palace" (around 1562) and so Andrew was probably born and raised there. He became minister of Burntisland, Fife, in 1593, was translated to Arbroath in 1596, and home to South Leith Parish Church in July 1600.

The same year he was appointed one of the members of the standing commission of the church, and in 1601 was made a royal chaplain, and in that capacity accompanied the Earl of Mar when he went as ambassador to the English court. He received a pension from the abbey of Arbroath for "service done to the king, and for his earnest care in discharging his ministerial functions, and in the common affairs of the kirk tending to the establishment of discipline", and in 1607 was made titular bishop of Brechin.

He was a member of the assembly of 1610 which allowed spiritual jurisdiction to the bishops, and was one of the three Scottish prelates who were consecrated at London in October of that year. In 1615 he presented a beautiful brass chandelier to the cathedral of Brechin, still to be seen there.

He was translated to the see of Galloway in 1619, and died in 1634. In his later years he became blind, and resided chiefly in Leith, where he had property. He was a favourite of King James, and a willing supporter of his measures for the introduction of episcopacy and the English ceremonies, but he was of a conciliatory temper, and the anti-prelatic party had nothing worse to say of him than that he "loved not to be poor".

It is said by the biographers of Samuel Rutherford that, at his admission to the parish of Anwoth, Kirkcudbrightshire, Lamb connived at his ordination by presbyters only. There is no evidence for this, but he was tolerant to Rutherford and others who did not conform to the articles enjoined by the Perth assembly.

He left a son James and two daughters, one of whom married Lennox of Cally and the other Murray of Broughton, both in the stewartry of Kirkcudbright. Several of his letters have been published in Original Letters relating to the Ecclesiastical Affairs of Scotland.

Religious titles
Preceded by Alexander Campbell	Bishop of Brechin; 1607–1619	Succeeded by David Lindsay
Preceded by William Couper	Bishop of Galloway; 1619–1634	Succeeded by Thomas Sydserf
