= David Lindsay (bishop of Edinburgh) =

Bishop of Edinburgh

- Bishop of Edinburgh
- Church: Church of Scotland
- See: Diocese of Edinburgh
- In office: 1634–1638
- Predecessor: William Forbes
- Successor: Vacant (until 1662)
- Previous post: Bishop of Brechin (1619–1634)

Orders
- Consecration: 23 November 1619 (as Bishop of Brechin)

Personal details
- Born: c. 1575 Probably Angus, Scotland
- Died: 1641 England

David Lindsay (died December 1641) was a Church of Scotland minister and prelate active in the seventeenth-century.

== Early life and career ==
Born around 1575, he was a son of Colonel John Lindsay, laird of Edzell in Angus, and graduated with a Master of Arts from the University of St Andrews in 1593. He became master first of the grammar school at Montrose, and then in 1597 of Dundee Grammar School, holding also from 1599 the ministry of Guthrie parish, and from 1605 of Dundee.

Next year, however, he resigned his mastership, while petitioning the town council to "take consideration of his estate, and that he may have ane sufficient moyan quhairupon he may lieve as ane honest man", but it was not till 1620 that he obtained a full payment of the augmentation then voted to his stipend.

Meanwhile, in 1616 he became a member of the high commission; in 1617 he defended at St Andrews, before James VI, some theses about "the power of kings and princes", and in 1618 supported the "king's articles" at the Perth general assembly, advancing similar arguments in the following years.

== Bishop of Brechin ==
He was rewarded with the bishopric of Brechin, being consecrated at St Andrews on 23 November 1619. He said to have contributed to the inscriptions in Brechin Cathedral. On 18 June 1633 he crowned Charles I at Holyrood.

He was admitted to the Privy Council of Scotland on 31 July 1634. He lived on at Dundee until 16 September, when he was translated to the post of Bishop of Edinburgh, and made one of the lords of exchequer.

== Bishop of Edinburgh ==
On 23 July 1637, the Sunday appointed for the introduction of a new service book, he was present at both the services in the St Giles' Cathedral, Edinburgh. It was here that Jenny Geddes threw a stool at his head as he read from The Book of Common Prayer. At both services he was pelted as he left the church, and in the afternoon there arose a great clamour in the streets, and the cry was "Kill the traitour". The Earl of Roxburgh took him up in his coach, but stones were cast at it, and some of them hit Lindsay so that with great difficulty he reached his lodgings at Holyrood.

The anonymous author of A breefe and true Relation of the Broyle &c., first printed as an appendix to Rothes' Relation (Bannatyne Club, 1830), is the sole authority for crediting Lindsay with displaying "the most shameful pusillanimity on this occasion". Deposed and excommunicated by the Glasgow general assembly in 1638, "he retired", says Mr. Lippe, "to England, and died there in 1641".

== Death and family ==
Such is not, however, Robert Wodrow's statement, and Jervise places his death between 1638 and 1640, as in the latter year his son John, was served heir to him in the estate of Dunkenny. Documents in National Archives of Scotland however reveal that he died in December 1641, and information from the Northumberland County Record Office indicate that he was buried at Berwick-upon-Tweed on 15 December 1641.

Lindsay married Christian Rutherford, widow of one of Lindsay's predecessors as master of Dundee Grammar School, either in, or sometime before, 1603. After her death he married Katherine Ramsay, daughter of Gilbert Ramsey of Banff.

== Sources (from DNB article) ==
This article incorporates text from the Dictionary of National Biography (1892)

Wodrow's Biographical Collections, ed. by the Rev. Robert Lippe (New Spalding Club, Aberdeen, 1890); A. Maxwell's Hist. of Old Dundee (Edinb. 1884); Scott's Fasti Eccl. Scot. vol. iii. pt. ii.; Lives of the Lindsays; Andrew Jervise's Land of the Lindsays; Keith's Scottish Bishops, p. 167.

== Notes ==
Religious titles
Preceded by Andrew Lamb	Bishop of Brechin; 1619–1634	Succeeded by Thomas Sydserf
Preceded by William Forbes	Bishop of Edinburgh; 1634–1638	Vacant Title next held by George Wishart
