= Alec Campbell (disambiguation) =

Alec Campbell (1899–2002) was the final surviving Australian participant of the Gallipoli campaign during the First World War.

Alec Campbell may also refer to:

- Alec Campbell (archaeologist) (1932–2012), archaeologist and museum curator in Botswana
- Alec Campbell (footballer) (1890–1943), footballer for Southampton and manager at Chesterfield

== See also ==
- Alexander Campbell (disambiguation)
