= Sir Simon Haughton Clarke, 9th Baronet =

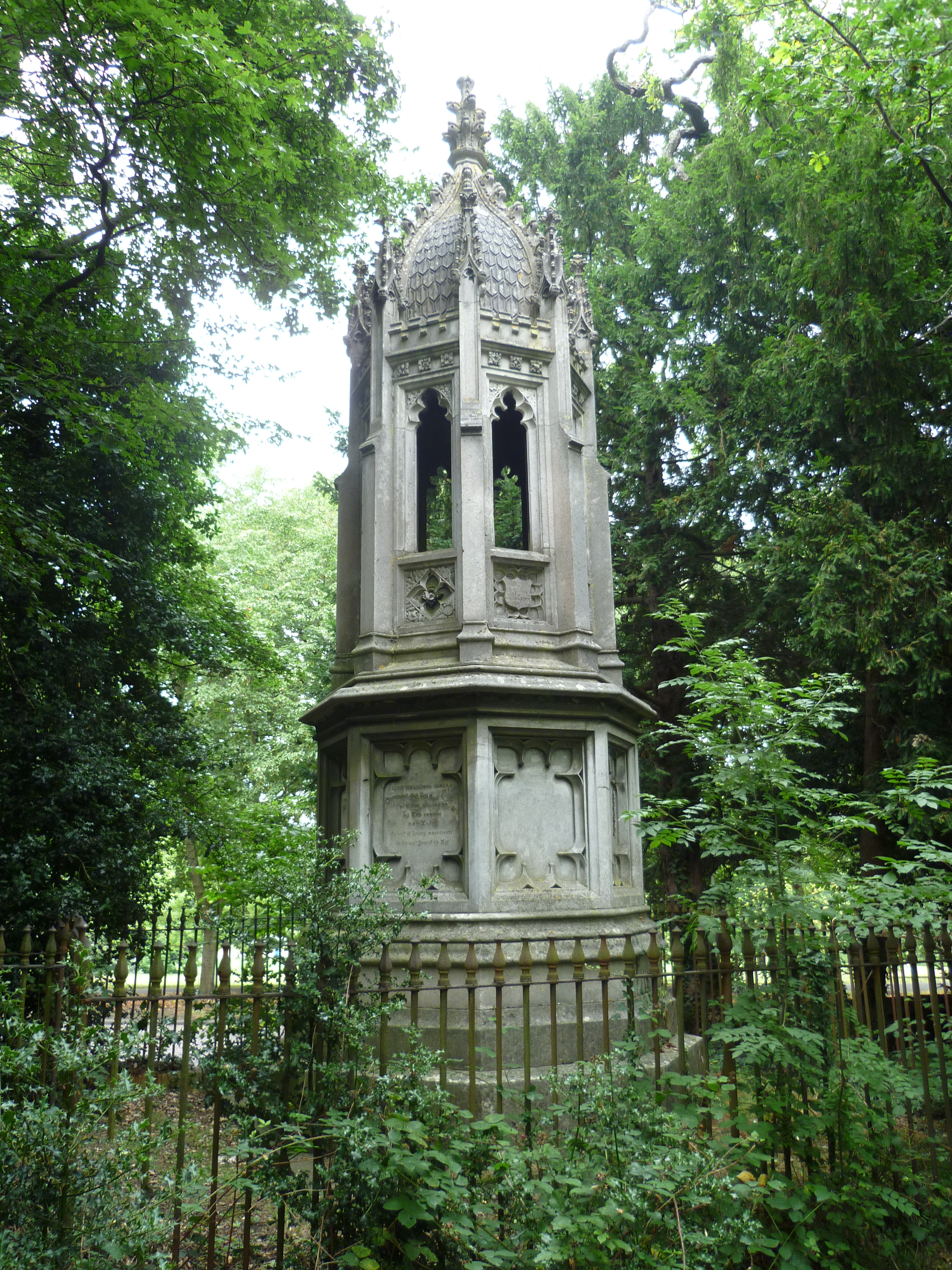
The Clarke monument, St Mary the Virgin, East Barnet.

Sir Simon Haughton Clarke, 9th Baronet (1764–1832) was a West Indies merchant, said to be the seventh richest man in England. He had a notable collection of paintings at his mansion at Oakhill. His estate, bought in 1821, ran from Chase Side, Southgate to High Road, Whetstone. After his death, his widow and sons lived at Oakhill until 1857 when the estate was broken up.

He is remembered in a monument at St Mary the Virgin churchyard in East Barnet, originally visible from Oakhill house.

== Family ==
Clarke had at least two sons with his wife, both of whom were baronets. They were:

- Sir Simon Haughton Clarke, 10th Baronet
- Sir Philip Haughton Clarke, 11th Baronet

== See also ==
- Clarke baronets

Baronetage of England
| Preceded by Philip Clarke | Baronet (of Salford Shirland); 1798–1832 | Succeeded by Simon Clarke |
