= Alexander Henry Campbell =

British politician (1822–1918)

Alexander Henry Campbell (31 July 1822 – 18 March 1918) was a British Conservative politician.

Campbell was the justice of the peace for Hertfordshire, and held the office of deputy lieutenant of Cornwall. In 1865 he was elected member of parliament for Launceston, a position he held until he resigned in 1868.

Campbell once owned Little Grove, a house in Hertfordshire that he sold to Sigismund James Stern.

Alexander Henry Campbell died on 18 March 1918, at the age of 96.

Parliament of the United Kingdom
Preceded by Thomas Chandler Haliburton	Member of Parliament for Launceston; 1865–1868	Succeeded by Henry Lopes
