= Alexander Campbell (journalist) =

British newspaper editor and executive (died 1961)

Alexander Campbell (c. 1883 – 10 September 1961) was a British newspaper editor and executive.

Born in Halifax, Campbell joined the Leeds Mercury, soon becoming its assistant editor. He then moved to become deputy editor of the Daily Record. In 1915, he moved to London, helping to launch the new Sunday Pictorial, and becoming its assistant editor.

In 1919, Campbell was appointed as editor of the Daily Mirror, and becoming a director of both the Mirror and the Pictorial. From 1929 to 1931, he served as honorary treasurer of the Institute of Journalists, and he also served as chair of the council of the Newspaper Press Fund, and on the boards of various hospitals.

Campbell left the editorship of the Mirror in 1930, but continued with the paper as a director, and as a special correspondent on various social and political issues. He retired fully in 1949, and died in Surrey on 10 September 1961, at the age of 78.
