= Frederick Charles Cass =

Rector of the parish of Monken Hadley, north London

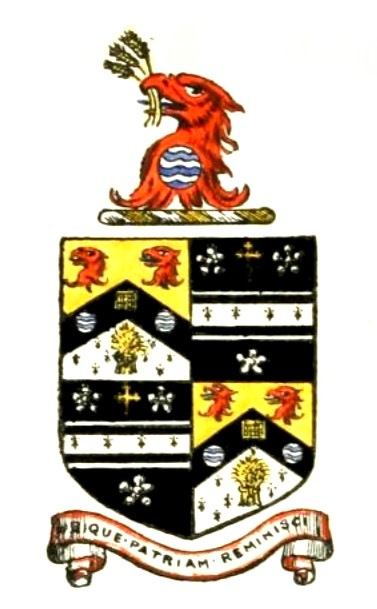
Arms of the Cass family on record with the College of Arms, 1893.

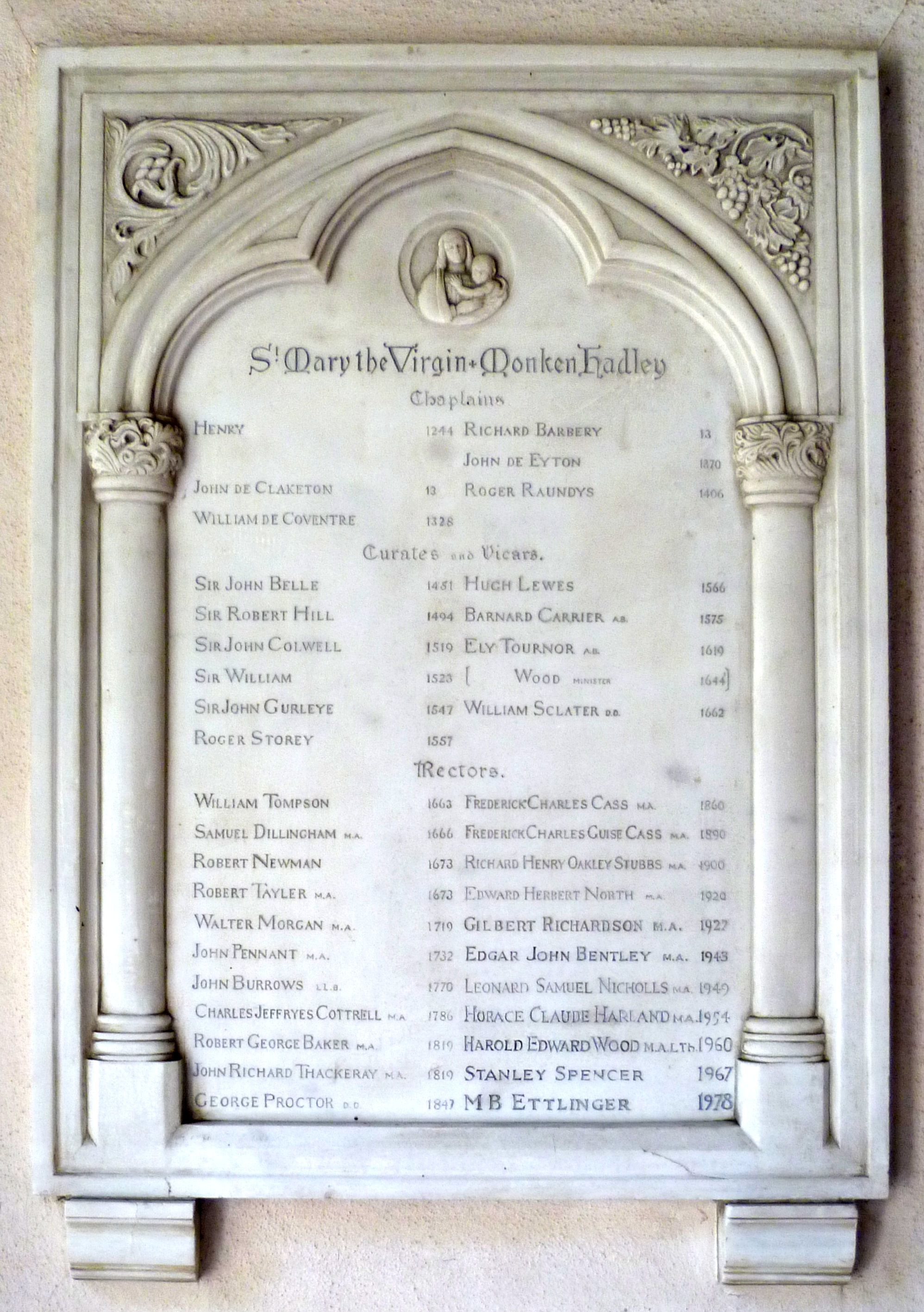
Plaque in the porch of St Mary the Virgin, Monken Hadley

Frederick Charles Cass (1824-1896) was the rector of the parish of Monken Hadley in north London. His father, also Frederick Cass, owned the relevant advowson giving the right to make such appointments. He was the author of works of local history relating to South Mimms, Monken Hadley and East Barnet.

== Early life and family ==
Cass was born at Beaulieu Lodge, Winchmore Hill, Edmonton, on 4 September 1824. He was baptised at Edmonton on 21 December 1824. His father was Frederick Cass J.P., D.L., of Beaulieu Lodge and later Little Grove, East Barnet, where he died on 17 May 1861. A funerary hatchment to his memory exists in St Mary the Virgin church, East Barnet. His mother was Martha Potter of Ponder's End. She died at Chester Terrace, Regent's Park, on 5 July 1870.

The Cass family were wealthy. Frederick Cass senior was able to leave an annuity of £1,000 per annum to his wife on his death and £10,000 for each of his sons' marriage settlements.

Cass received his M.A. degree from Balliol College, University of Oxford.

== Clerical career ==
In 1855, Cass was curate at St Andrew's church, Totteridge. In 1861 he became rector of Monken Hadley after being willed the advowson of the parish on his father's death. Frederick Cass senior, who was not a cleric, had bought the right in 1857. Frederick Cass junior was succeeded as rector by his second son Frederick Charles Guise Cass (born 1859) in 1890 or 1891, his first son Frederick Herbert Cass having died in 1855.

== Writing ==
Cass produced histories of South Mimms, Monken Hadley, and East Barnet that are among the principal histories of those areas. He wrote a history of the Queen Elizabeth's School, Barnet, from its founding in 1573 to 1665 for the transactions of the London and Middlesex Archaeological Society which was later published in book form.

== Marriage ==
Cass married Julia Elizabeth Tewart at Hove, Sussex, on 23 June 1853. They had children Frederick Herbert (1854), Agnes Julia (1856), Gertrude Margaret (1858), Frederick Charles (1859), Claude William (1861), and Arthur Herbert (1861).

== Death ==
Cass died 2 October 1896.

== Commemoration ==
Brenda Gove writes that three windows at St Mary the Virgin commemorate members of the Cass family. A window depicting the Virgin Mary and St James was placed in the church in memory of Cass in 1848. The Good Shepherd Window was placed in memory of the Cass's mother Martha, and the south aisle contains a window in memory of Cass's daughter Agnes.

== Selected publications ==
- South Mimms. Nichols, London, 1877. (frequently bound with East Barnet)
- Monken Hadley. Nichols, London, 1880.
- "Queen Elizabeth's School at Chipping Barnet, A.D. 1573-1665" in Transactions of the London and Middlesex Archaeological Society, Vol. 5. (Reprinted in book form, London c. 1881)
- East Barnet. Nichols for the London and Middlesex Archaeological Society, London, 1885–92. (published in two parts)
