= Sandy Campbell (singer) =

American actress and singer

Sandy Campbell is an American actress and singer based in Southern California. She made her debut in solo album Crazy World. She performed in the premiere of Lucy Simon's Zhivago at the La Jolla Playhouse.

== Career ==
Her works include The Happiest Fella (Rosabella), Man of La Mancha (Aldonza), Sweeney Todd (Johanna), Falsettos (Cordelia), Into the Woods (Cinderella), West Side Story (María), Drood (Rosa Bud), and Fiddler on the Roof (Hodel). She has appeared in straight plays, most notably as Bella in Lost in Yonkers.

== Accolades ==
Campbell has been nominated for the San Diego Theater Critics Circle's Craig Noel award six times. She won the Leading Actress in a Musical in 2012 for her performance in Parade.

In 2015, she was nominated for Leading Actress in a Musical for her performance in Master Class.
