= Alexander Campbell (footballer) =

Scottish footballer

Personal information
- Full name: Alexander Campbell
- Date of birth: 7 March 1883
- Place of birth: Inverness, Scotland
- Position: Full back

Senior career*
Years	Team	Apps	(Gls)
1905–1906	Clachnacuddin		
1906–1910	Middlesbrough	34	(0)
1910–1901	Clachnacuddin		
1911–1912	Leeds City	1	(0)
Total		35	(0)
- * Club domestic league appearances and goals

Alexander Campbell (born 7 March 1883) was a Scottish footballer who played in the Football League for Leeds City and Middlesbrough.
