= Alexander Campbell of Carco =

Scottish bishop

Alexander Campbell Alasdair Caimbeul
- Bishop of Brechin
- Church: Church of Scotland/Roman Catholic Church
- See: Diocese of Brechin
- In office: 1566–1607
- Predecessor: John Sinclair
- Successor: Andrew Lamb

Orders
- Consecration: 21 July 1566 x 23 July 1569

Personal details
- Born: c. mid-16th century Probably Atholl
- Died: February 1608; Kinclaven parish, Atholl

Alasdair Caimbeul or Alexander Campbell of Carco (died February 1608) was a Scottish noble and prelate. Coming from a branch of Clan Campbell in the allegiance of the Earl of Argyll, his career began in the 1560s still only a minor, serving the Earl of Argyll's interest. He was made Bishop of Brechin, and almost immediately alienated the majority of the bishopric's historical resources into the hands of the earl.

After some traveling to receive a Protestant education at Geneva, he returned to Scotland in the mid-1570s as an adult and resumed his career as minister and (now) titular Bishop of Brechin. He held this position until 1607, a year before his death.

== Accession and alienation ==
A native of Atholl and the son of Eóin Caimbeul (Sir John Campbell), laird of Ardkinglas, he was born in the mid-16th century. During the minority of King James VI of Scotland, Alexander's brother Seamus Caimbeul (James Campbell of Ardkinglass), became comptroller.

Still a minor, on 6 May 1566, at the instigation of Gilleasbaig Caimbeul, the Protestant Earl of Argyll, Alasdair Caimbeul was put to the vacant bishopric of Brechin. Crown nomination to the papacy was sent on 21 July 1566, and although Caimbeul was acting with a bishop's authority almost immediately, there is no proof that he had received consecration until he is clearly represented as consecrated-bishop in a document dating to 23 July 1569.

The earl's purpose in pushing his young kinsman into the bishopric was made clear by the new bishop's following actions. Bishop Alasdair proceeded to alienate most of the bishopric's lands and revenues, giving the lion's share to the earl. According to the historian Robert Keith, Bishop Alasdair "retained for his successors scarce so much as would be a moderate competency for a minister in Brechin".

== Travels ==
In May 1567, Alasdair Caimbeul received royal licence to leave Scotland, though he was still in the country in July 1569, when he voted against the proposal to annul the divorce between Mary, Queen of Scots, and the Earl of Bothwell. Although his activities are difficult to trace, Caimbeul was attending school in Geneva in January 1574, but travelled back to Scotland later in the year with his tutor Andrew Polwart and the latter's friend Andrew Melville, who were in Edinburgh by July of the same year.

== Later episcopate ==
After returning to his native country, he resumed his charge as minister and titular Bishop of Brechin, attending general assemblies of the Scottish Church in his capacity as bishop. James Paton, Bishop of Dunkeld, another Argyll acolyte, accused Caimbeul of giving out pensions on the revenues of his bishopric. This came before the Edinburgh assembly of March 1575, which ordered that John Erskine of Dun, Superintendent for Angus and the Mearns instruct Caimbeul on the duties befitting a bishop.

Five years later, Bishop Alasdair was once again in trouble with the church. He failed to attend a summons issued to him by the Dundee assembly of July 1580, and in 1582 another assembly ordered the Presbytery of the Mearns to bring charges against him. The outcome of these charges is, however, not known, as the records do not survive. In the following two decades, though, Caimbeul can be seen to take an active part in establishment politics, attending many assemblies, parliaments and meetings of the privy council, often acting as a supporter of Argyll. Notably, the privy council which met at Brechin in April 1602 denounced him as a traitor, even though Caimbeul himself was sitting on it. That was the last time that Caimbeul sat on the privy council.

== Death and family ==
Caimbeul resigned the bishopric of Brechin on or before 22 April 1607. He retired to his estates at Carco, near Kinclaven in Atholl. He died the following year, in February 1608.

As marriage became acceptable in post-Reformation Scotland, Caimbeul was married twice, firstly to the daughter of the laird of Circlet, Margaret Bethune, and secondly to Helen Clephane. Clephane, who bore him two daughters and one son survived her husband's death as a widow.

== Notes ==
Religious titles
Preceded by John Sinclair	Bishop of Brechin; 1566–1607	Succeeded by Andrew Lamb
