= Kell Brothers =

Engravers and printers

Coordinates: 51.51409°N 0.12473°W

Kell Brothers were engravers and printers in Castle Street, Holborn, London, who specialised in lithographic prints. They were active from 1860 to the early 1870s.

== Output ==
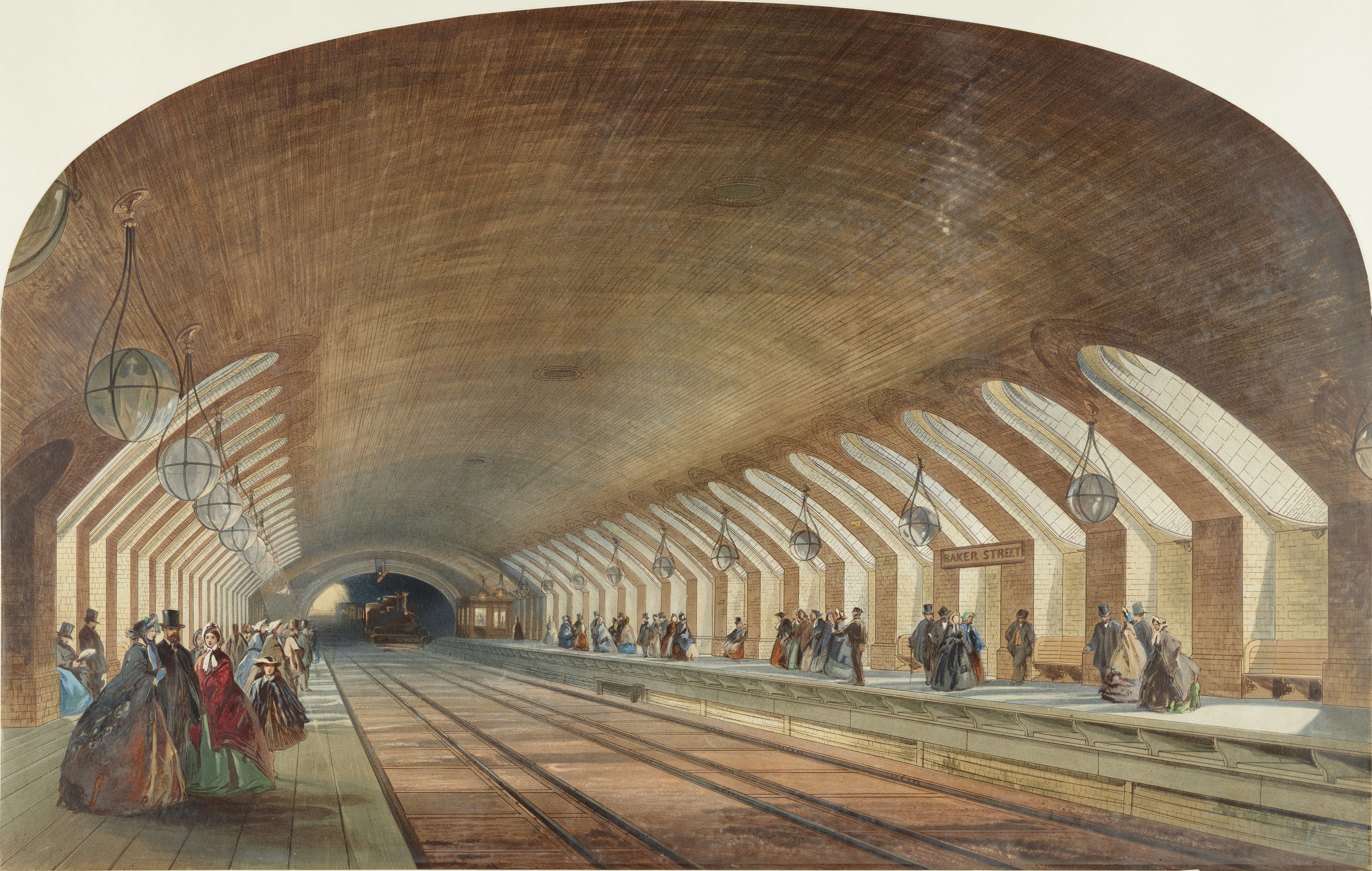
Metropolitan Railway, Baker Street Station. Chromo lithograph published by Kell Brothers, c. 1863.

In 1860, the firm advertised in The Times, "TO LITHOGRAPHERS. - WANTED, good DRAUGHTSMEN and WRITERS..." They contributed to the first volume of The Architectural Dictionary, published in 1862, and produced a wide range of material, including topical scenes such as the new Metropolitan Railway station at Baker Street opened in 1863. In 1870, the firm participated in the competition run by the Art Union of London with chromo-lithographs of Belagio-Como from an original drawing by Birkett Foster.
