= St Mary the Virgin, East Barnet =

Coordinates: 51.63534°N 0.15602°W

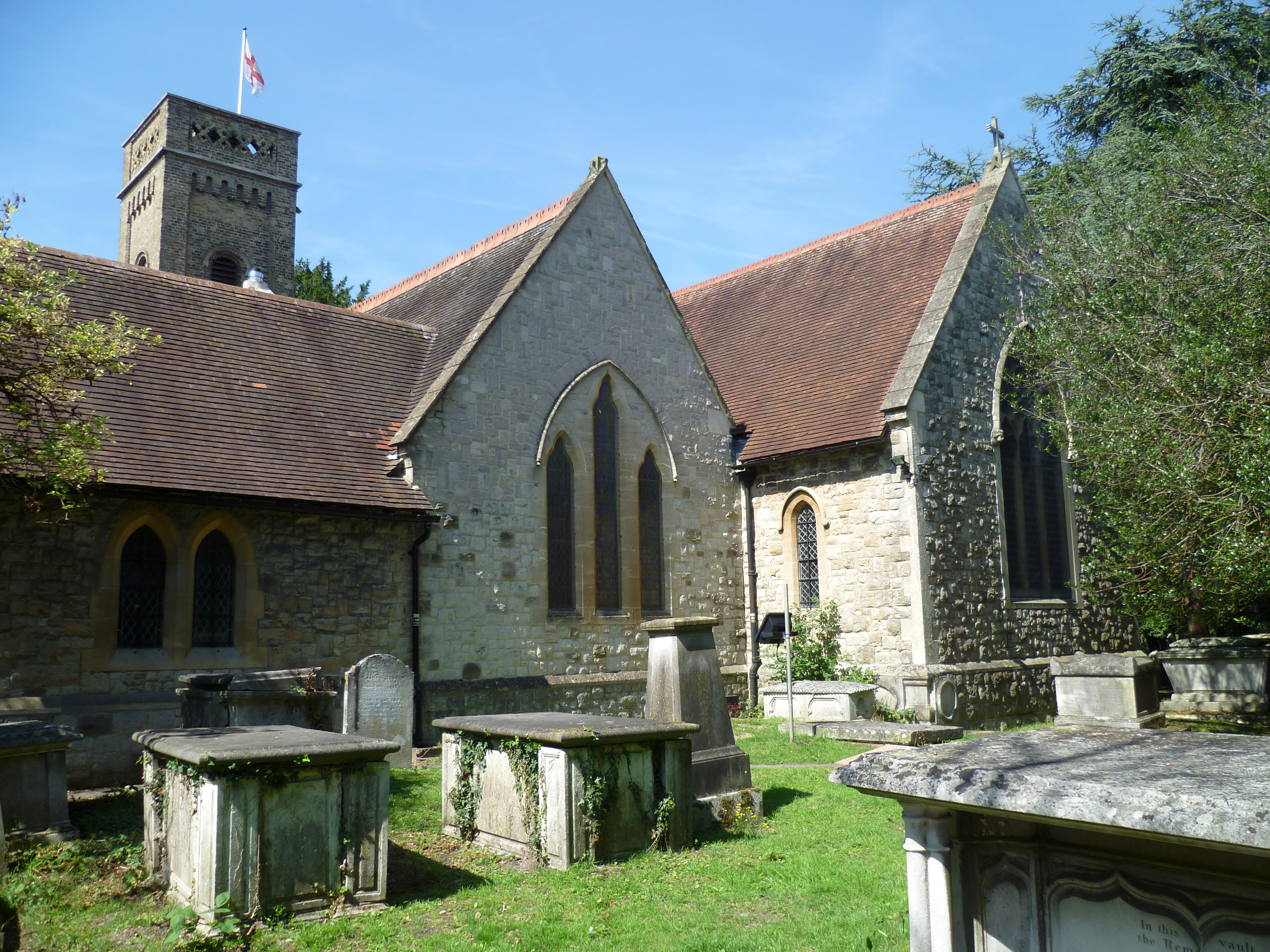
- St Mary the Virgin, East Barnet from the rear
- St Mary the Virgin, East Barnet
- OS grid reference: TQ 27707 94554
- Country: England
- Denomination: Church of England
- Previous denomination: Roman Catholic
- Website: Official website

Architecture
- Heritage designation: Grade II*

Administration
- Diocese: St Albans
- Archdeaconry: Hertford
- Deanery: Barnet
- Parish: East Barnet

Clergy
- Rector: Alec Corio

St Mary the Virgin is the Church of England parish church for East Barnet within the Diocese of St Albans. It is located on Church Hill.

Originally built in 1080 AD, the current church is a grade II* listed building mostly constructed in the 19th century; the north wall is the only surviving remnant of the original building.

== History ==
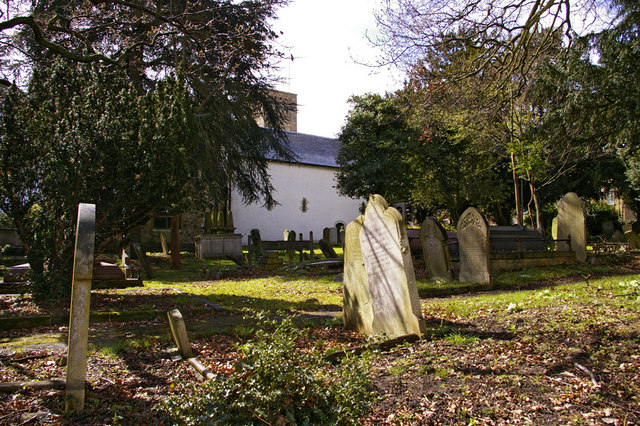
St Mary the Virgin churchyard

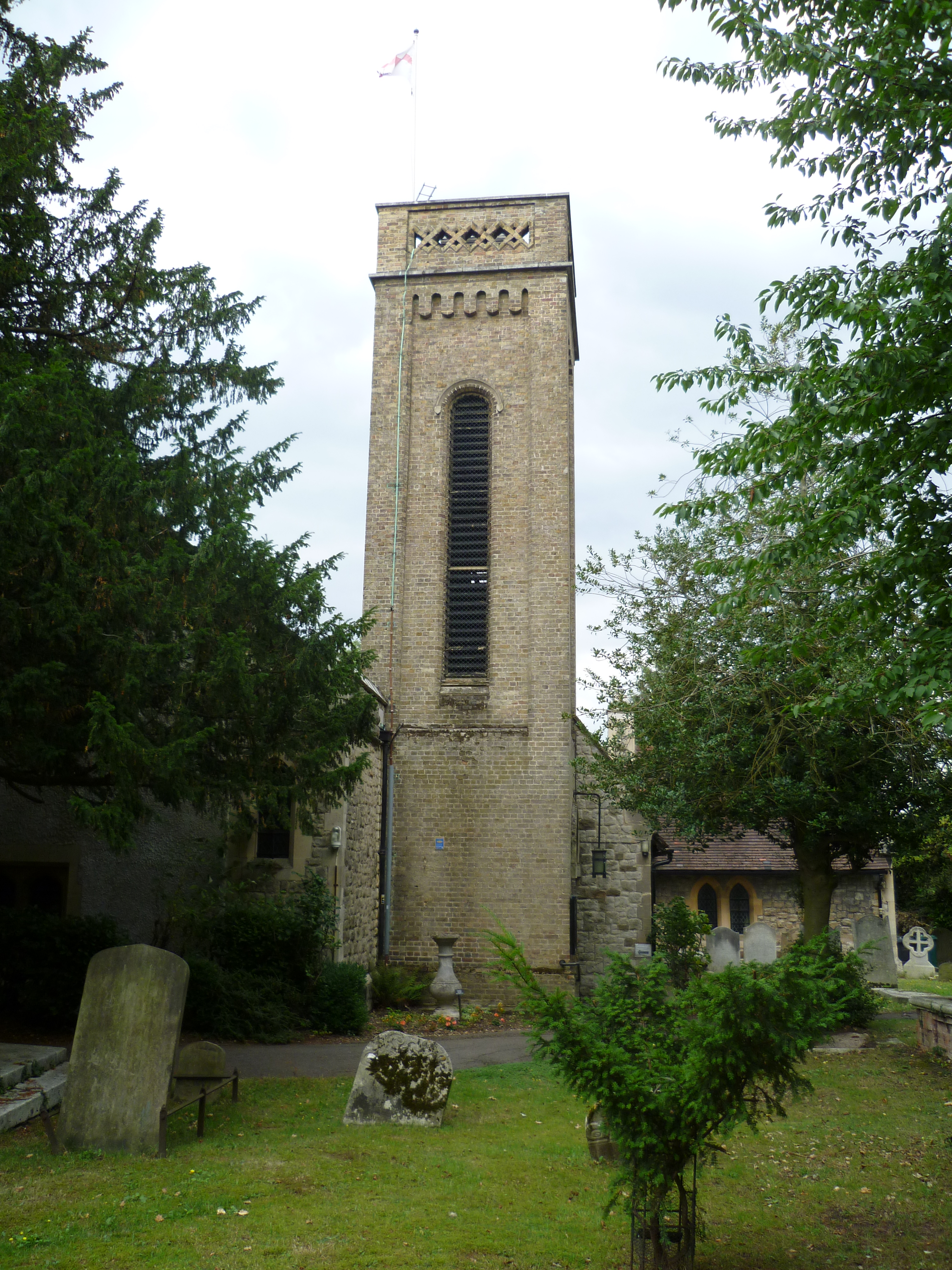
The church tower

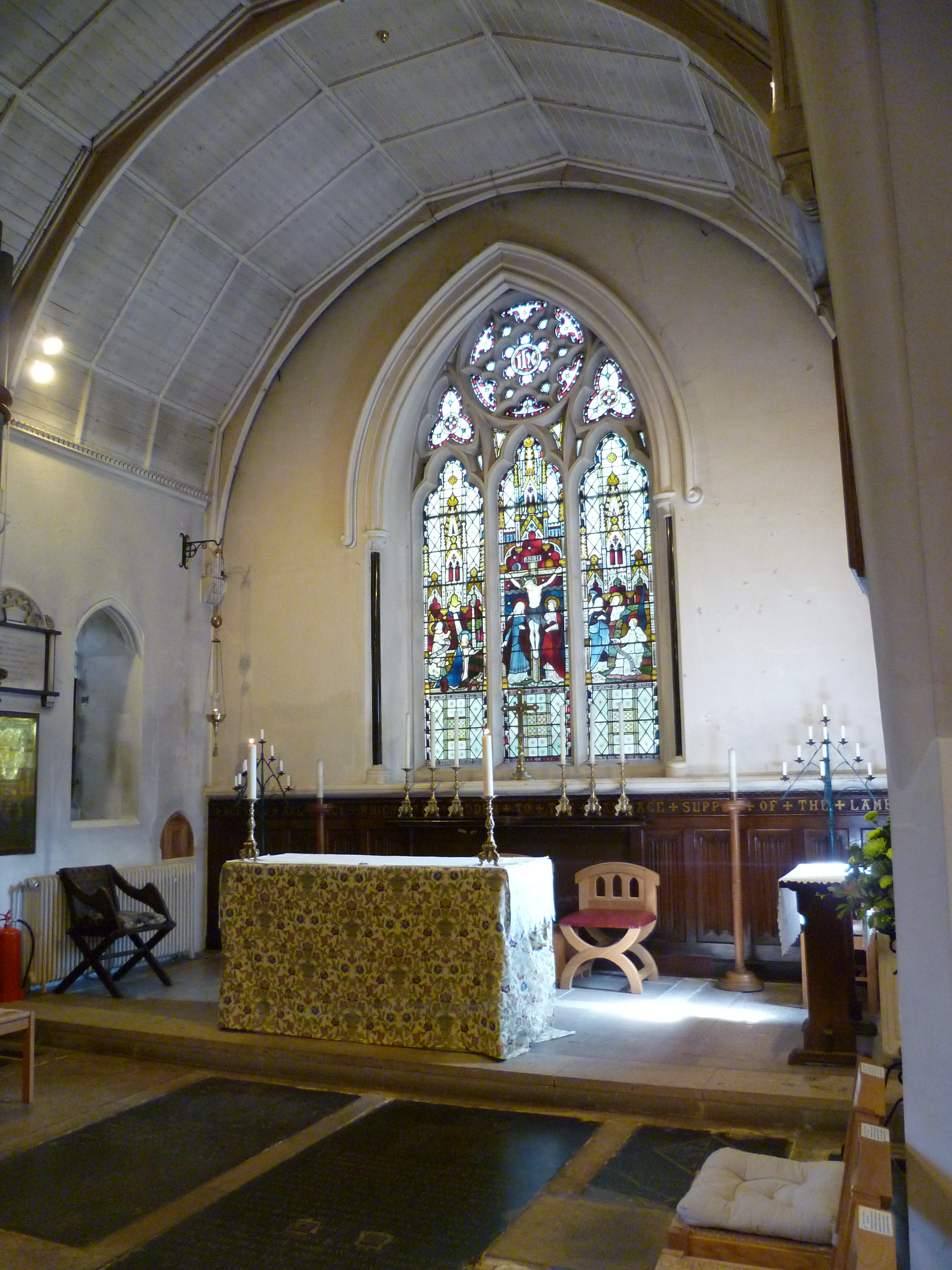
The church altar

=== Early history ===
The church was originally constructed in 1080, as a small chapel on the hill. It was dedicated to St Mary the Virgin. The Abbot of St Albans consecrated it and he became both Patron and Rector until the Reformation. After the Reformation, the church's rector was appointed by the reigning monarch – a practice which continues to this day.

The first chapel had thick walls made of compressed rubble, lime and plaster with stone around the openings. The windows had no glass. Much of the north wall is from that time. The frame of the door on the south side is probably also from that same period. The chapel might have had an apse.

The church on Chipping Barnet hill was probably founded in the middle of the 13th century, almost certainly as a chapel-at-ease to that of St Mary at East Barnet. It is certain that it had been built by Michaelmas 1276 because a court roll entry refers to ‘an obstruction on the road leading to the church of Barnet and the market’.

Nevertheless, Chipping Barnet would not become a separate parish for another 600 years. At St Mary's, glass had been put in the windows by the 13th century and some of it is still there today. The apse was replaced in the 1400s with a larger chancel and a porch would have been constructed to protect the door.

In 1794 a wooden turret was erected on the church. It contained three small bells. By the 18th century the roof space of the church was being used as a vestry and store so a dormer window was knocked through above the porch.

=== Recent history ===
Most of the present church dates from the 19th century, including a yellow brick Neo-Norman tower of 1828. A churchwarden in 1805 decided to raise the walls by four feet and create a new roof over the old. A new window was installed and later the turret was replaced by an octagonal belfry. The belfry stayed only for eleven years until 1828 when the tower was built. It was separated from the church by the width of the old porch. It was reported at the time,

“This unpleasant construction absorbed, it is believed, the larger part of subscriptions destined to the general improvement of the edifice.”

Clearly it was not met by unanimous praise but it was built in a year. In 1861 two bells cast at the Whitechapel Bell Foundry were manufactured by Mears of London. The larger was cracked so they were replaced by the present three bells in 1960, donated to the memory of Mr & Mrs Taylor. Although the tower is only fifty feet high, because of the church's position on the hill top it can be seen from a very long way, often surmounted by a flag blowing in the breeze.

In 1849, G. E. Street, the architect of the Law Courts in the Strand, undertook some minor alterations in the church and uncovered a medieval piscina and some patterned wall paintings. In the 1860s the Church Farm School, next door to St Mary's, had many boys who attended the church and sang in the choir. It was decided in 1868 to extend the church and add another aisle. The extension was built and the south wall of the church demolished and replaced by arches. A door was pierced into the tower to provide an entry to the south aisle and a flank door allowed access to the graveyard. By 1869 the historic box pews had been replaced and choir stalls had been installed. In 1872 the lychgate was erected at a cost of £130. The stile beside it was to stop animals entering the churchyard and grazing on the poisonous yew berries. In 1875 the painted window of the Annunciation was placed in the west end of the north aisle to commemorate the foundation of the church by the abbey. This was later removed. It is probable that the roof on the new south aisle would have been finished before the arches were opened to the nave.

The chancel was extended in 1880. It was lengthened by twelve feet incorporating a new east window celebrating the Annunciation of St Mary. This was presented by a churchwarden at a cost of £100. The choir stalls were doubled in length. The chancel roof was reshaped and the organ chamber was constructed as a transept. The present gallery was completed for the choir and it also housed a barrel organ which had been given by Sir Simon Haughton Clarke, 9th Baronet fifty years previously.

In 1920 the present organ was constructed and sited in the organ chamber. During the Second World War the church was damaged by enemy action which required much of the roof and some walls to be repaired.

== Building ==
The church is a grade II* listed building with Historic England.

=== Lychgate and yew ===
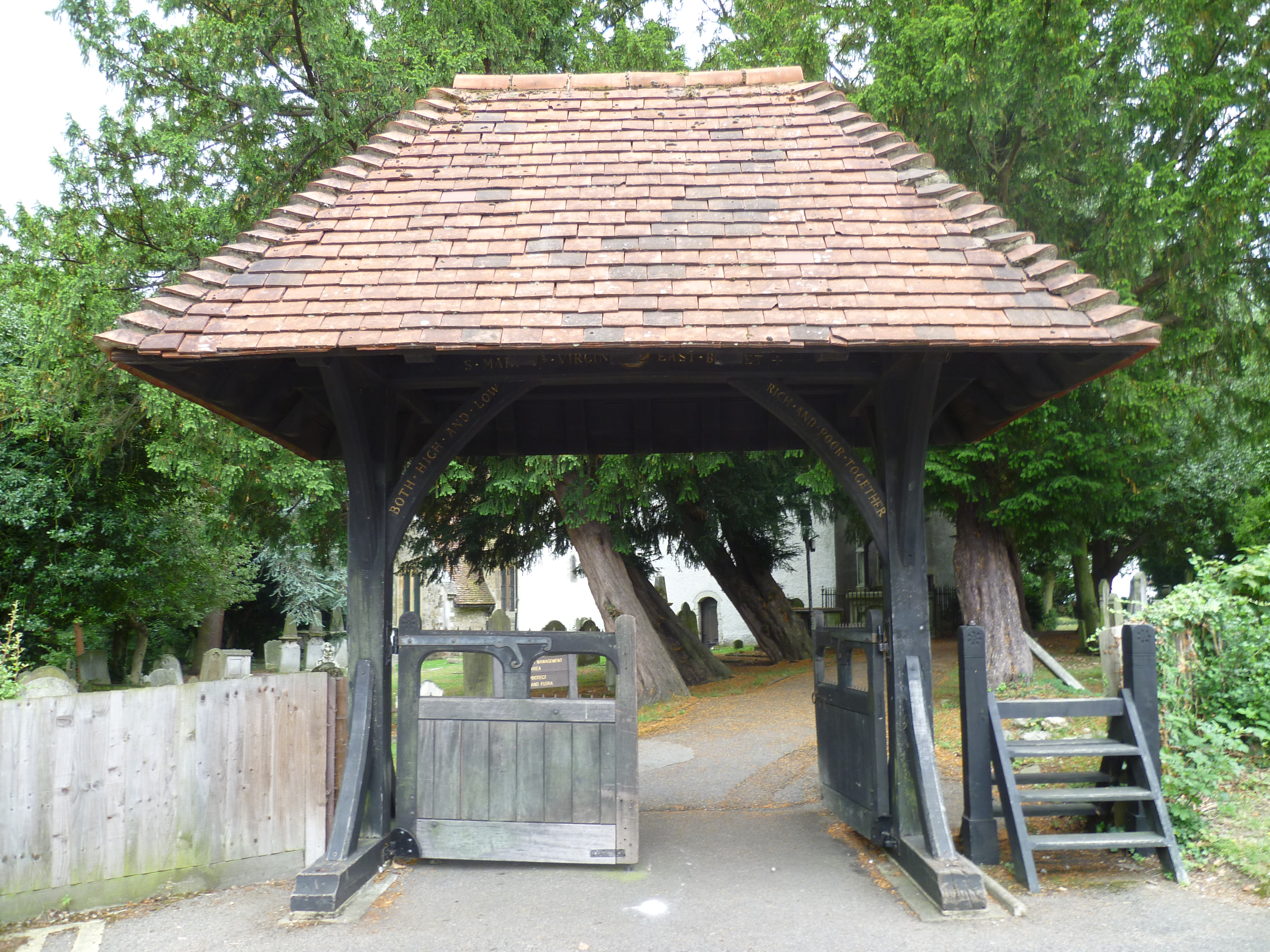
The lychgate

Entrance to the church is by way of the lychgate. It was first erected here in 1872, and rebuilt in 1991. It bears the legend "Both High and Low, Rich and Poor together". In the south west corner of the churchyard there is a young yew tree, taken as a cutting from the Eastling Yew in Kent, believed to have been alive at the time of Christ's birth. It was planted here in the year 2000 to mark the beginning of the third millennium of Christianity.

=== Tower ===
The bell tower was built in 1828, originally free-standing from the rest of the building. There are three bells, recast in 1961 from the two original bells cast at the Whitechapel Foundry in 1861.

=== Interior ===
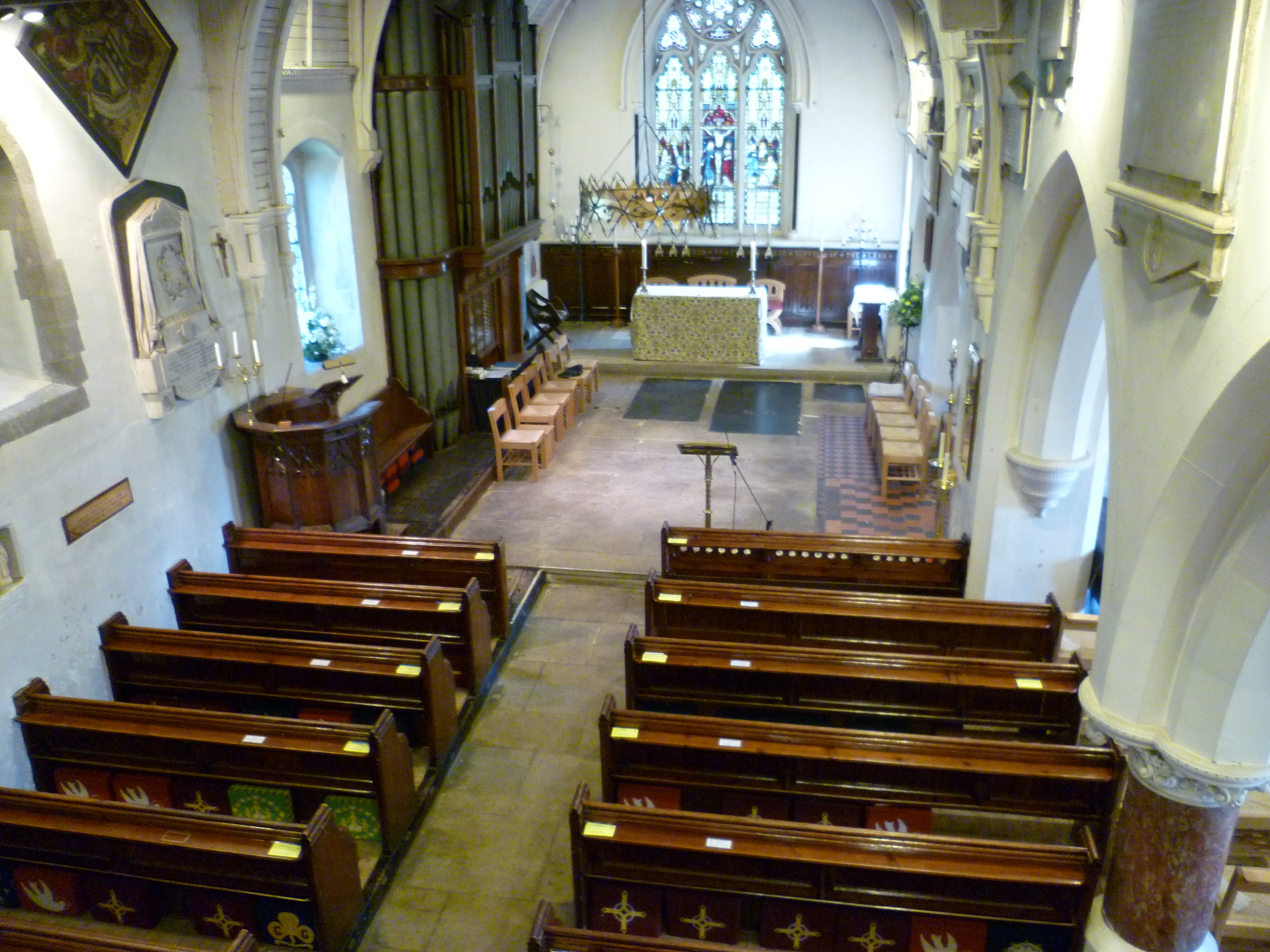
Interior of St Mary the Virgin, East Barnet

Inside, above the doors hangs a crucifix, made by the Wild Goose Studio in Kinsale. It is a replica of a 12th-century Byzantine ‘Christus Rex’, the earliest form of crucifix showing Christ crowned as King and enthroned on the cross. The original is in Glenstal Abbey, a Benedictine monastery in south west Ireland. Placed at the entrance, this cross is a reminder of the church's ancient Benedictine roots.

The church's register dates back to the 16th century, and there are monuments from the 17th century.

The north wall, painted white on the outside and illuminated at night, is the oldest part of the church, and all that remains of the first stone church on this site built in 1080. It is built from rubble and lime plaster, with stone used around the windows only. A stone tablet by the north wall states that this wall was damaged during the Second World War and restored. The small niche in the north wall usually holds a statue of St Benedict who founded the Benedictine order.

The current pews date back only to 1868 or thereabouts, and replaced box pews.

=== Chancel ===
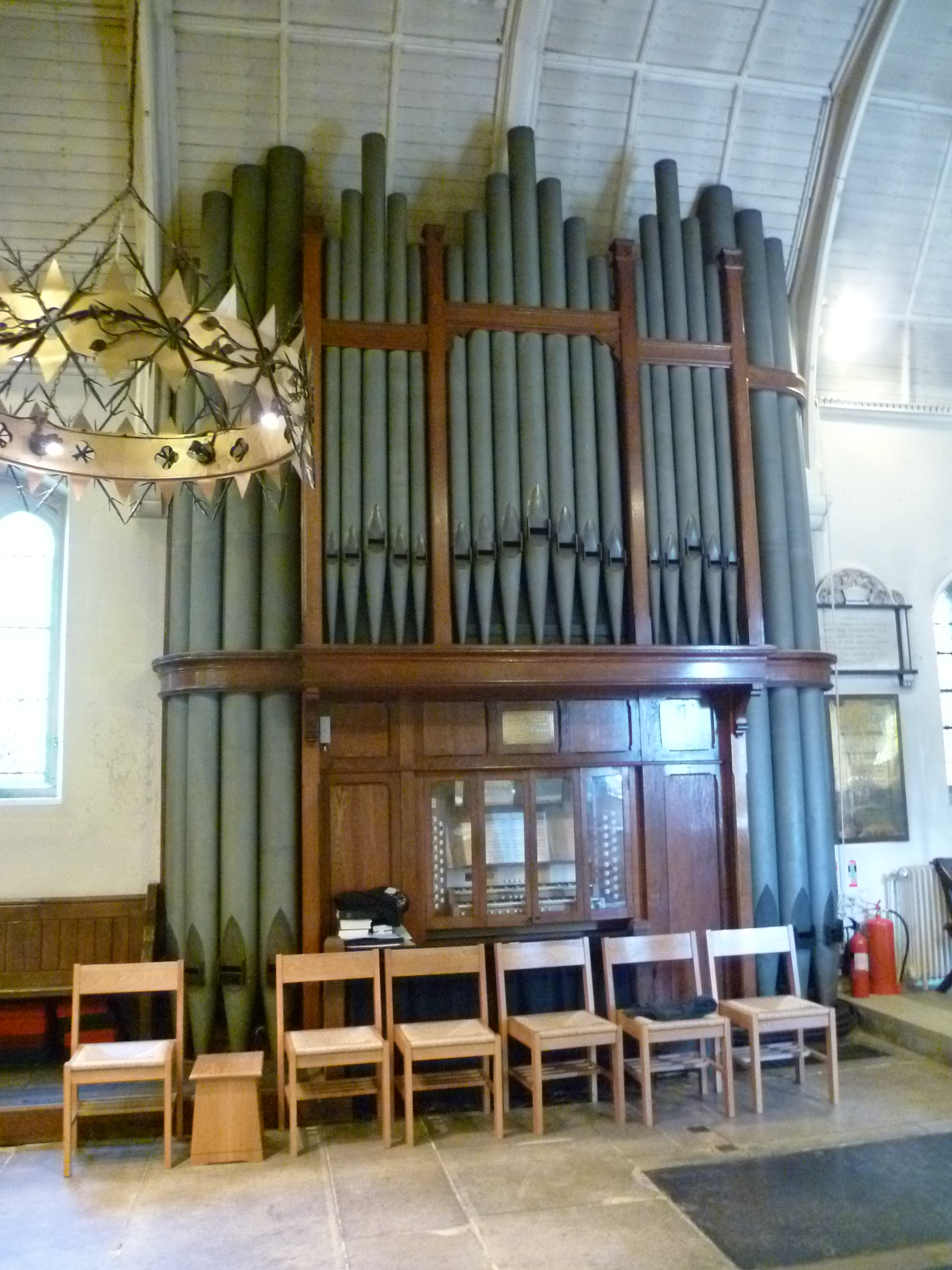
The church organ, with the crown hanging from the ceiling

The chancel was built around 1400, and there are records of its repair and enlargement in 1632 at the instigation of Sir Robert Berkeley. On the floor to the south side of the chancel, under the Bishop's Chair, there is an empty space where a brass bearing the Berkeley family crest was once positioned. For many years this was the only remaining brass in the church, but it too has now gone. All there is today is a rubbing. The chancel was dominated by heavy Victorian choirstalls, which were removed in 2000 to create a more open and flexible space. On the window ledge on the north side is a statue brought back from the shrine of Our Lady of Walsingham in Norfolk. Hanging above the chancel space is a wrought iron Corona (crown) installed in 2000 and symbolising the kingship of Christ. It is made up of three separate crowns intertwined: the crown of thorns, the crown of life (symbolised by the vine) and the golden crown of victory.

The east window was added as part of the extension of the chancel in 1880 and from left to right tells the story of the Annunciation, when the archangel Gabriel informs the young Mary that she is to be the mother of Jesus, and the Crucifixion and Resurrection of Christ. In keeping with the dedication of the church to Saint Mary the Virgin, only she is pictured in every scene, dressed in a blue robe.

The South Aisle Window is the memorial to the men and women of St Mary's congregation who fell during the Second World War (the village memorial is outside Brookside Methodist Church), and the lower panels bear their names and the insignia of the Army, Navy and Air Force.

The organ was installed in 1920, the gift of the Vernon family in memory of their only son, killed in action during the First World War.

== Burials ==
- Major General George Prevost, Governor of Canada 1811–1815.
- Sir William Richmond Cotton, Lord Mayor of London in 1875.

== Monuments ==
- Sir Simon Haughton Clarke, 9th Baronet (1764–1832), local landowner.
