= Faulkner (surname) =

Faulkner is a name variant of the English surname Falconer. It is of medieval origin taken from Old French Faulconnier, "falcon trainer". It can also be used as a first name or as a middle name.

== People with the surname ==
=== A–J ===
- Adam Faulkner (swimmer) (born 1981), British swimmer
- Alex Faulkner (1936–2025), Canadian ice hockey player
- Alexander Faulkner Shand (1858–1936), English writer and barrister
- Andrew Faulkner (born 1992), American baseball player
- Arthur Faulkner (1921–1985), New Zealand politician
- Aubrey Faulkner (1881–1930), South African cricketer
- Bayard H. Faulkner (1894–1983), American politician
- Bobo Faulkner (1941–2014), English model, television personality, was married to Trader Faulkner
- Brian Faulkner, Baron Faulkner of Downpatrick (1921–1977), Northern Irish politician and government minister, prime minister of Northern Ireland 1971–1972
- Brian Faulkner (born 1947), British soldier
- Cameron Faulkner (born 1984), Australian rules footballer
- Charles Faulkner (disambiguation), several people
- Charmian Faulkner, Australian missing person
- Chris Faulkner (born 1960), American football player
- Colleen Faulkner, American author
- Damien Faulkner (born 1977), Irish race car driver
- Daniel Faulkner (1955–1981), American police officer
- David Faulkner (disambiguation), several people
- Dennis Faulkner (1926–2016), Northern Irish military officer
- Edward Faulkner (1932–2025), American actor
- Elizabeth Faulkner, common misspelling of Elizabeth Falkner (born 1966), American chef
- Eric Faulkner (born 1953), Scottish guitarist in the 1970s band the Bay City Rollers
- Eric Faulkner, pseudonym of May Brahe (1884–1956), Australian music composer
- Gary Faulkner Jr. (born 1990), American ten-pin bowler
- George Faulkner (c. 1703–1775), Irish publisher
- George Faulkner (disambiguation), any of several people of the same name
- Graham Faulkner (born 1947), British actor
- Harris Faulkner (born 1965), American newscaster
- Henry Faulkner (1924–1981), American artist
- Hugh Faulkner (disambiguation), several people
- Jack Faulkner (1926–2008), American football coach and administrator
- James Faulkner (disambiguation), any of several people of the same name
- Jeff Faulkner (born 1964), American football player
- Joan Faulkner-Blake (1921–1990), New Zealand broadcaster
- Joanne Faulkner (born 1972), Australian writer and philosopher
- John Faulkner (born 1954), Australian politician
- John Faulkner (racing driver) (born 1952), New Zealand-Australian racing driver
- John Alfred Faulkner (1857–1931), American church historian
- Judith Faulkner (born 1943), American billionaire

=== K–Z ===
- Kenneth William Faulkner (born 1947), American politician
- Kristen Faulkner (born 1992), American cyclist
- Larry Faulkner (born 1944), American academic and businessman
- Lisa Faulkner (born 1973), British actress
- Louise Faulkner, Australian missing person
- Mary Faulkner, pseudonym of Kathleen Lindsay (1903–1973), English author
- Max Faulkner (1916–2005), British golfer
- Mike Faulkner, American guitarist
- Neil Faulkner (disambiguation), several people
- Newton Faulkner (born 1985), British musician
- Pádraig Faulkner (1918–2012), Irish politician
- Peter Faulkner (born 1960), Australian cricketer
- Raymond O. Faulkner (1894–1982), British Egyptologist and philologist
- Richie Faulkner (born 1980), English guitarist
- Richard Faulkner, Baron Faulkner of Worcester (born 1946), British politician
- Roy Faulkner (1897–?), Canadian association football player
- Sally Faulkner (born 1946), British film and television actress
- Sandford C. Faulkner (1803–1874), American composer and fiddler
- Shannon Faulkner (born 1975), American military cadet and educator
- Shawn Faulkner (born 1962), American football player
- Steve Faulkner (born 1954), British footballer
- Thomas Faulkner, various
- Tom Faulkner (c. 1719–1785), English cricketer, wrestler and boxer
- Trish Faulkner (born 1945), Australian-American former professional tennis player
- Ronald Trader Faulkner (1927–2021), Australian actor, was married to Bobo Faulkner
- Virginia Faulkner (1913–1980), American writer and editor
- Walt Faulkner (1918–1956), American racing driver
- William Faulkner (1897–1962), American novelist

== People with the middle name ==
- Bruce Faulkner Caputo (born 1943), American politician
- Fred Faulkner Lester (1926–1945), United States Navy sailor, Medal of Honor recipient
- George Faulkner Wetherbee (1851–1920), American painter

== Fictional characters with the surname ==
- Adam Faulkner (Saw), character from the Saw film series
- Anne Faulkner, character of the series Paradox Live
- Bjorn Faulkner, protagonist of the 1934 play Night of January 16th by Ayn Rand
- Kitty Faulkner, real-life name of the DC Comics character Rampage
- Lesley Williams Faulkner, character of the ABC soap opera General Hospital
- Ted Faulkner, character of the Australian television program Blue Heelers
- Robert Faulkner, a sailor in Assassin's Creed III

== See also ==
- Faulkner (disambiguation)
- Falconer (surname)
- Faulconer (surname)
- Falkner (disambiguation)
- Faulknor (disambiguation)
- Fawkner (disambiguation)
