= John Faulkner (disambiguation) =

John Faulkner (born 1954) is a former Australian senator and member of the federal cabinet.

John Faulkner may also refer to:

- John Faulkner (actor) (1872–1934), Australian actor of theatre and film
- John Faulkner (American politician) (born 1965), member of the Mississippi House of Representatives
- John Faulkner (footballer) (1948–2017), English professional footballer
- John Faulkner (pilot) (born 1937), Australian pilot and aviation safety consultant
- John Faulkner (racing driver) (born 1952), New Zealand-Australian racing driver
- John Faulkner (writer) (1901–1963), American author
- John Alfred Faulkner (1857–1931), American church historian
- John Lees Faulkner (1812–1882), New Zealand trader, shipbuilder and farmer
- John Pascoe Fawkner (1792–1869), Australian pioneer
