= 2003 Queen's Birthday Honours (Australia) =

Queens birthday announcement

The 2003 Queen's Birthday Honours for Australia were announced on Monday 9 June 2003 by the office of the Governor-General.

The Birthday Honours were appointments by some of the 16 Commonwealth realms of Queen Elizabeth II to various orders and honours to reward and highlight good works by citizens of those countries. The Birthday Honours are awarded as part of the Queen's Official Birthday celebrations during the month of June.

== Order of Australia ==
=== Companion (AC) ===
==== General Division ====
Recipient	Citation	Notes
The Right Honourable John Douglas Anthony	For service to the Australian Parliament, for forging the development of bi-lateral trade agreements, and for continued leadership and dedication to the social, educational, health and development needs of rural and regional communities.	
Sir Roderick Howard Carnegie	For service to the promotion of innovative leadership and to the development of competitive practices in business, both national and international, and to the community, particularly in the health and arts fields.	
The Honourable Richard Fairfax Court	For service to the Western Australian Parliament and to the community, particularly the Indigenous community, and in the areas of child health research and cultural heritage and to economic development through negotiating major resource projects including the export of gas to China furthering the interests of the nation as a whole.	
The Honourable Michael Walter Field	For service to the Tasmanian Parliament, particularly through leadership in the area of fiscal governance to restrain public debt, and for service to business and the community.	
Margaret Anne Jackson	For service to business in diverse and leading Australian corporations and to the community in the area of support for medical research, the arts and education.	
John Buxton Laurie	For service to consulting engineering in Australia, to the export of engineering services overseas, and to community support in education, health and major infrastructure developments.	
Emeritus Professor Jacques Francis Miller	For service to medical science in the area of immunology research, particularly in relation to seminal contributions to the understanding of the working of the immune system leading to wider research in tissue transplantation, immunological deficiency syndrome and control of cancer.	
Lady Primrose Catherine Potter	For leadership and for encouragement of support for critical community growth through fundraising and philanthropy in the arts, sciences, education and social welfare.	

=== Officer (AO) ===
==== General Division ====
Recipient	Citation	Notes
Chesleigh Antony Baragwanath	For service to the community in the area of public accountability and financial management and in the development of standards through initiatives such as privatisation and advances in information technology.	
Professor Bruce Henry Barraclough	For service to medicine as a surgeon, to medical education, particularly the development of high level surgical training facilities, and to the community through fostering improvements in the delivery of safe, quality healthcare in Australia.	
Patrick Joseph Barrett	For service to the promotion of good governance in the public sector, particularly as an advocate for the principles of accountability, continuous improvement and the identification and management of risk.	
Professor Robert Baxt	For service to the law, particularly as a leading spokesperson in the areas of trade practice, competition, taxation and corporate law, and in the field of legal education.	
Professor Lawrence Joseph Beilin	For service to medicine as a clinician, teacher and researcher, particularly in the field of hypertension and related cardiovascular disease and the promotion of lifestyle measures to treat and prevent these conditions.	
Professor Bruce Neil Benjamin	For service to laryngology and to paediatric otolaryngology, particularly airways diseases in children, through the development of equipment and techniques, clinical practice, teaching and participation in professional organisations.	
Bonita Louise Boezeman	For service to the community as a significant contributor to and fundraiser for a broad range of medical, sporting and cultural organisations, and to the business sector as a corporate leader and executive.	
Jillian Rosemary Broadbent	For service to economic and financial development in Australia, and to the community through administrative support for cultural and charitable groups.	
The Honourable Justice Robert Brooking	For service to the judiciary, particularly through the Victorian Court of Appeal, to the law in the areas of tenancy, building law and arbitration, and to the community.	
Professor Margaret Anne Burgess	For service to public health in Australia and overseas, particularly through the provision of policy advice to government and through undertaking research into vaccine preventable diseases and the control of infectious diseases, and to paediatrics.	
Peter Irving Burrows	For service to the community through the provision of expertise and support for medical research and educational and cultural organisations, and to business, particularly through the investment sector.	
Geraldine Frances Doogue	For service to the community, particularly as a commentator for social change, and to the media through raising public awareness of issues involving ethics, values, religion and spirituality.	
Professor Malcolm McDougal Fisher	For service to medicine nationally and internationally, particularly as a pioneer in the development of intensive care medicine as a speciality, to education, and to research in the area of severe allergic reactions.	
Dr Thanacoupie Fletcher-James	For service to the community, particularly through her pioneering work in education, training and youth programs, in the area of reconciliation, and to the visual arts as a ceramic artist.	
Dr Stephen Alexander Grenville	For service to the financial management sector and to international relations, particularly as a major contributor to the development of economic and monetary policy in Australia and in the south east Asian region.	
Emeritus Professor Maxwell Leo Howell	For service to education as a pioneer in the development of sports studies and sports science as academic disciplines both in Australia and overseas, and to the study of sports history.	
Professor Andrea Douglas Hull	For service to the arts, to arts education, and to policy development, particularly through improving community access and involvement in cultural pursuits.	
Professor Kenneth Stanley Inglis	For service as a leading contributor to Australian social and cultural development, and to scholarship, particularly in the field of history as a researcher, writer and educator.	
Dr Dean Harold Jaensch	For service to education and the study of Australian politics as an analyst and writer, and to the community through raising public awareness and stimulating debate about the political process.	
Graeme Thomas John	For service to business through the introduction of competitive initiatives and strategic leadership as managing director of Australian Post, and to the community, particularly by fostering corporate support for charitable organisations.	
Commissioner Philip Christian Koperberg	For outstanding service to the community through the development of an internationally recognised firefighting service, ensuring that training and equipment are of a high standard, and providing informed comment on hazard reduction and educating the community on bushfire safety.	
Professor Norelle Lickiss	For service to the development of palliative medicine as a medical specialty, particularly with reference to cancer pain relief, and to medical education.	
Gregory John Lindsay	For service as a major contributor to education and public debate through the activities of the Centre for Independent Studies by raising awareness of social and economic issues affecting Australia.	
Commissioner Richard McCreadie	For service to the community as Commissioner of Police in Tasmania, particularly as a contributor to the development of strategies to deal with the impact of illicit drugs, participation in a range of national policing arrangements, and improvements in training standards for police.	
Brother Robert Julian McDonald	For service to education, particularly as Chancellor of the Australian Catholic University, to religious life through Church-related social justice, welfare and educational programs, and to the community through the promotion of ethics in the workplace.	
Bryan Maxwell Noakes	For service to industrial relations in Australia and overseas through policy development, fostering improved relations between employers and employees and as an expert in the area of international labour law.	
Dennis James Richardson	For service to the community in a range of public policy areas including foreign policy, immigration and security.	
Peter David Ritchie	For service to business and industry development in Australia by providing employment opportunities and training for young people, and to the community through corporate, financial and material support for health and educational facilities.	
Judith Mary Roberts	For service to the community, particularly through leadership roles in a range of women's health, social service, family and multicultural organisations and boards, and to education through Flinders University, the Senior Secondary Board of South Australia and the Helpmann Academy.	
Professor Mary Christina Sheehan	For service to education and to public health through research work into the causes and prevention of road, work and social accidents in Australia, and through the development of community awareness programs raising the level of debate in the area.	
Lois Alleyne Simpson	For service to music as an internationally acclaimed cellist, teacher and chamber musician.	
Sir Garfield St Aubrun Sobers	For service to cricket as a player and supporter of young players, particularly from disadvantaged areas and groups, and to the community through support for charitable organisations	
Professor Raymond John Stalker	For service to aerospace engineering, particularly through the research and development of scramjet powered hypersonic vehicles and the Stalker tube.	
Sister Berenice Stubbs	For service to the community, particularly through the initiation, organisation and implementation of palliative care services in the Australian Capital Territory and surrounding region, and through support for the development of new and national health information technologies.	
Peter Ronald Vallee	For service to science through the Australian Academy of Science, and to science education, particularly the development of innovative educational resources and outreach services.	
Stephen Rodger Waugh	For service to cricket as a leading player, and to the community, particularly through the Udayan children's home.	
Emeritus Professor Leslie Roy Webb	For service to tertiary education as an administrator, to the development of a range of initiatives aimed at addressing specific community and student needs, and to fostering relationships between university and government instrumentalities.	
Dr Judy Gay West	For service to the advancement of botanical science and research, particularly in the field of plant systematics, to science administration and policy development, and to the establishment of Australia's Virtual Herbarium.	

==== Military Division ====
Branch	Recipient	Citation	Notes
Army	Lieutenant Colonel Maurice Raymond McNarn	For distinguished service to the Australian Army, particularly during the planning and conduct of Operations SLIPPER, BASTILLE and FALCONER.	

=== Member (AM) ===
==== General Division ====
Recipient	Citation	Notes
Associate Professor Thomas Michael Adamson	For service to neonatal paediatrics and medical research, particularly through the study of respiratory and sleep disorders, and to the establishment and development of specialist medical and teaching facilities.	
Professor Robert Charles Atkins	For service to medicine, particularly in the field of nephrology, through research in the area of inflammatory diseases of the kidney and through education and professional organisations.	
Patricia Margaret Barblett	For service to environmental conservation and management, and to the development of eco-tourism opportunities in Western Australia.	
Christopher John Barnes	For service to the community of the Hunter Valley region through the promotion of the wine, tourism, and hospitality industries.	
Dr John Stanley Beard	For service to botany and ecology through the recording and mapping of plant vegetation types in Western Australia.	
Clifford William Breeze	For service to the banking and business sectors, and to the community as an advocate for greater corporate social responsibility and through support for charitable organisations.	
Jan Letchford Brill	For service to rural women, particularly through the Country Women's Association of Australia, and to the community of the Riverina region.	
Associate Professor Alexandra Jane Bune	For service to medical education, particularly through curriculum and medical school development, and to medical workforce planning to meet community needs in rural and urban areas.	
His Honour Ian Brandwood Burnett	For service to the law and to the judiciary, particularly in the development of judicial administration through procedural reform and implementation of technological advances	
The Honourable Francesco Calabro	For service to the New South Wales Parliament, and to the community of Fairfield through local government and through youth, sport and recreation clubs.	
Gregory Arthur Calcutt	For service to the law through the Office of the Parliamentary Counsel for Western Australia and to the development of statute law.	
Professor Terence John Campbell	For service to medicine in the fields of clinical pharmacology and cardiology, to the development of medical and health policy, to education, and to the community.	
Peter Gordon Carew	For service to business development and to the community of the Northern Territory through the development of links between business, government, and education organisations to promote overseas trade.	
Margaret Lyndsey Cattermole	For service to the information and communication technology industry, and to the community, particularly through women's and children's health organisations.	
Lee Thomas Collins	For service to medical physics in Australia through the development of safety standards, by providing training in radiation safety, and through participation in professional organisations.	
Gordon Stewart Cooper	For service to the tax profession and to the community as an adviser on national taxation and legislative reform, and through education and professional organisations.	
Roger Campbell Corbett	For service to the retail industry, particularly as a contributor to the development of industry policy and standards, and to the community.	
Nicholas Richard Cowdery	For service to the development and practice of criminal law, and to the fostering of international co-operation in the area of human rights.	
Dr David William Cox	For service to medicine and to the community, particularly through the Medical Board of the Northern Territory.	
Rodney Peter Croome	For service to the community as a human rights advocate, particularly through promoting tolerance and understanding of the human rights of gay and lesbian people.	
Professor James Phillip Cull	For service to Australian geoscience, particularly through the study of geothermal energy and ground water exploration.	
Professor Noel George Dan	For service to neurological science and surgery through clinical practice, research and education, and by fostering links between neurosurgeons in Australia and overseas.	
Dr James Logie Davidson	For service to the wheat industry through the development of new winter wheat varieties suitable for cultivation in the higher rainfall and colder regions of Australia.	
Elizabeth Ann Davies	For service to youth through the Guiding movement as Australian Training Adviser and State Commissioner, New South Wales, and to the community through a range of organisations.	
Professor Peter John Dennis	For service to education, particularly the study of Australian military history, through research and as an author, teacher and academic administrator.	
William David Donaldson	For service to the community, particularly through the Rotary Australia World Community Service.	
Paula Margaret Duncan	For service to the community through fundraising for charitable organisations, and to the entertainment industry.	
John Peter Faulkner	For service to the aviation industry, particularly in relation to air safety, and as a contributor to tertiary education programs.	
Professor Christopher Joseph Fell	For service to engineering, particularly through the Membrane and Separation Technology Research Centre and the Federation of Australian Scientific and Technological Societies, and to higher education.	
Dr Arthur Geoffrey Fenton	For service to science, particularly in the field of cosmic radiation research, through significant technical developments, sustained planning and leadership.	
Robert James Fisher	For service to the public sector in Western Australia, particularly through the development of trade and industry and family and children's services, and to the community.	
Joan Valerie Fitz-Nead	For service to the community of Tasmania through a range of health, social welfare and educational organisations.	
John Alexander Fitzgerald	For service to the promotion of the Olympic movement, to the community through support for a range of charitable organisations, and to journalism.	
Walter John Foreman	For service to sport, particularly through the Western Australian Institute of Sport and through the establishment and operation of national level elite athlete programs.	
Murray Riche France	For service to the fishing industry and to the marine environment, particularly through leadership in the promotion of sustainable fisheries management.	
Colin Robert Galbraith	For service to the law, particularly through the Council of Legal Education of Victoria, and to the legal profession.	
Baroness Gardner of Parkes	For service to the promotion of Australian interests in parliamentary and government circles in the United Kingdom, and to the community.	
Peter Robert Garrett	For service to the community as a prominent advocate for environmental conservation and protection, and to the music industry.	
The Reverend David Muir Gill	For service to ecumenism and church co-operation, particularly through the National Council of Churches in Australia.	
Philip Nigel Glass	For service to the community, particularly people with a physical disability, through organisations providing support and employment services.	
Dr Alexander Gonski	For service to medicine, particularly through the development of neurosurgery services, surgical techniques and teaching.	
Carolyn Gray	For service to the community, particularly through the Carers' Association of Australia and organisations that focus on the needs of the ageing and people with disabilities.	
Dr John Moore Greenaway	For service to medicine, particularly at the Royal Prince Alfred Hospital, through clinical practice, education, research and medical ethics.	
Maxine Muriel Griffiths	For service to the community as an advocate for people with disabilities, and through the development of resources to assist with their integration into the wider community.	
Brigadier Doreen Evelyn Griffiths	For service to the community, particularly through providing care and support for children and families attending the Melbourne Children's Court.	
Dr William Middleton Griggs	For service to medicine, particularly through trauma, emergency and intensive care management and education, and critical care retrieval and transport in Australia, and in support of the Australian Defence Force internationally.	
Dr Norman Charles Habel	For service to education and the development of courses in religious studies in tertiary institutions in Australia, to reconciliation and social justice, and to the environment.	
Robert Allen Hamond	For service to Australian Rules football, particularly through the development of the Adelaide Football Club and as a player and coach.	
Dr Geoffrey William Harley	For service to ophthalmology through the establishment of the National Trachoma and Eye Health Program, the Royal Children's Hospital, professional associations and humanitarian support to developing countries.	
Richard Frederick Haselgrove	For service to the Australian wine industry, particularly through management in technical and commercial areas and elevation of industry standards, and to the community through Mallee Family Care.	
The Reverend John Jeffrey Hebblewhite	For service to nursing, particularly the care of people with spinal cord injuries, and to people with disabilities through the development of holiday travel opportunities.	
Heather Mary Hill	For service to nursing, particularly in the field of stomal therapy, and as an adviser to support groups.	
Dr Robert John Hunter	For service to science in the field of colloid and surface chemistry, as an educator and researcher, and to the community through the promotion of scientific social responsibility.	
Graham Charles Huxley	For service to the building and construction industry through the development of a Japanese market for Australian steel house framing and building products, and to the community, particularly people with cerebral palsy, their families and carers.	
Professor David Eric Ingram	For service to education through the development of language policy, through assessment procedures for evaluation of proficiency, and through research and teaching.	
Terry Jackman	For service to the entertainment industry through film distribution and screening, to tourism development, and to the community as a fundraiser.	
Dr Bernard Raymond Kelly	For service to medicine through professional organisations concerned with standards of medical practice in Australia, and as a general practitioner in the Redfern area.	
Keith Edward Kemp	For service to sport in the Northern Territory, particularly as an administrator and coach of hockey.	
Professor James Barrie Kirkpatrick	For service to environmental conservation, particularly in relation to World Heritage assessment and the development of forest reservation criteria.	
David John Klingberg	For service to the community of South Australia, particularly through contributions to the tertiary education sector and through engineering projects designed to improve infrastructure and services.	
Peter Arthur Kyle	For service to the community through Fairbridge Western Australia Incorporated, particularly its development for the benefit of youth, heritage and the environment, and to local government.	
Toni Lamond	For service to the entertainment industry, and to the community through fundraising for a range of organisations, including the Guide Dog Association of New South Wales and ACT.	
Elizabeth Yvonne Langford	For service to nursing through risk identification and the development of strategies to prevent injury within the profession, and by providing support to people injured in the workplace.	
Dr Heather Jacqueline Lopert	For service to health care, particularly as a contributor to the development of ambulance officer clinical standards and practice.	
Dr Gordon Low	For service to medicine and to international relations through the establishment of Project China.	
David Hillel Lowy	For service to aviation, particularly the preservation and promotion of Australias aviation history through the establishment of the Temora Aviation Museum.	
Professor Richard Gordon Mackay	For service to cultural heritage management and archaeology, and to youth through the Scouting movement.	
James Joseph Macken	For service to industrial relations as an advocate, judge, academic and author.	
Kenneth Francis Madigan	For service to local government, and to the community of Port Pirie.	
Associate Professor John Francis Mahony	For service to renal medicine as a physician, administrator and educator, and to patient care through the Sydney Dialysis Centre.	
Dr Helen Patricia McCue	For service to the community in Australia and overseas as a contributor to development assistance, public health and education projects and as an advocate for human rights, refugees and refugee issues.	
Robert Donald McGregor	For service to public sector administration in New South Wales, particularly through the provision of health care and ambulance services.	
Percival Alfred McGuigan	For service to the development of the Hunter Valley wine industry, and to the community.	
Professor lan McKenzie	For service to medical research through the development of research facilities in Australia, particularly the Austin Research Institute, and in the fields of immunology, cancer diagnosis and therapy, transplantation and xenotransplantation.	
Dr Judy Ann Messer	For service to conservation and the environment, particularly through the Nature Conservation Council of New South Wales.	
John Robert Mitchell	For service to sports administration, particularly through the Melbourne Cricket Club and the re-development of the Melbourne Cricket Ground.	
John Noel Morse	For service to the tourism industry, particularly through the development of new initiatives to promote Australia as a tourist destination and through consolidation of the position of Indigenous tourism as an important sector of the industry.	
Lindsay Bill Moyle	For service to the community through the Australian Multicultural Foundation and through a range of organisations in the community development, health services and management education sectors.	
Dr Harold John Nesbitt	For service to agriculture as project manager and agronomist for the Cambodia International Rice Research Institute — Australia Project and, through this project, to the community of Cambodia.	
Geoffrey Edward Nicholas	For service to golf as a player and role model for young amputees, and to the community.	
Professor John Peter Nieuwenhuysen	For service to the community through contributions to independent academic, public and private sector research, to debate on immigration, cultural diversity, equity, economic development, taxation, Indigenous, labour and industry issues, and to reform of the liquor laws of Victoria.	
Dr Graham Ronald Nunn	For service to medicine, particularly as a cardiothoracic surgeon in the field of paediatric surgery, and as an educator and researcher.	
Dr William David Pannell	For service to the wine industry as a contributor to the development of the wine regions of Margaret River and the south west of Western Australia.	
Dr Ian Malcolm Parsonson	For service to veterinary science through research, administration and management, particularly in the fields of infectious diseases, safety and ethics in gene technology, and the development of laboratory safety guidelines.	
Dorothy Joyce Pascoe	For service to rural women, particularly through the Country Women's Association of Australia, and to the community of the central west region of New South Wales.	
Graham Gordon Paynter	For service to primary industry, particularly education and training through the Rural Training Council of Australia, and to the community.	
Brother Thomas Oliver Pickett	For service to education and to the community, particularly people with disabilities, through the Wheelchair Workshop project in Australia and overseas.	
John Arthur Pitman	For service to secondary education as a contributor to the processes of educational change in relation to curriculum development, assessment reform and certification.	
Associate Professor Peter George Procopis	For service to medicine, particularly paediatric neurology, as a clinician, administrator and educator, and to the community.	
Dr Bryan Gray Radden	For service to the academic and professional development of pathology, particularly in the field of maxillofacial and oral pathology.	
Ronald Warwick Radford	For service to arts administration, particularly as Director of the Art Gallery of South Australia and by initiating appreciation of Australian artists and their work within the community.	
Rosalie Estelle Ramsay	For service to education, particularly as Head of the Pymble Ladies College Junior School and through professional organisations, and to the community.	
Sister Margaret Ann Randall	For service to older people as a gerontologist and diversional therapist, and to the community.	
Emeritus Professor Terrence Aidan Roberts	For service to the surveying profession, particularly in the area of education, as an advocate for the adoption of emerging technology and through participation in the activities of professional associations.	
Captain Kenneth Hugh Ross	For service to the Australian maritime industry, particularly through the development of sectors including ship towage and salvage, pilotage and ship safety.	
Vicki-Jo Russell	For service to conservation and the environment through encouraging community-based participation in activities aimed at conserving threatened flora and fauna in South Australia and for the initiation and establishment of the 'Birds for Biodiversity-MLR' program.	
Basil Scarsella	For service to soccer in Australia and overseas as an official and administrator.	
Dr William Hunter Schofield	For service to the Australian Defence Forces aviation capabilities as a research scientist and administrator, particularly through the Aeronautical and Maritime Research Laboratory.	
Edward Rankin Scott	For service to business and international trade as a producer and exporter of agricultural products, and to the community of Bourke.	
Else Egede Shepherd	For service to the engineering profession, particularly electrical and electronic engineering, to education, to the electricity distribution industry, and to the community.	
Dr John Wickham Shepherd	For service to medicine in the fields of education and training, particularly through the Australian College of Rural and Remote Medicine, and as a practitioner and advocate.	
Alexander Stewart Smith	For service to public sector administration in New South Wales through contributions to sector reform, commitment to administrative excellence and training.	
Marion Smith	For service to the community, particularly issues affecting women, through the activities of the Presbyterian Women's Association and the National Council of Women.	
Lady Snedden	For service to the arts, particularly dance through administrative roles with and support for the Australian Ballet, and to the community, particularly children.	
Robert Stanly Somerville	For service to education in Western Australia as a contributor to the advancement of educational opportunities, particularly for Aboriginal students, and to youth through the Australian Air Force Cadets.	
Associate Professor Walter Bruce Steele	For service to scholarship in the field of literary studies, and to the community through contributions to the development of organ and choral music.	
The Reverend Dr Lance Graham Steicke	For service to ecumenism through the National Council of Churches in Australia, and to the Lutheran Church.	
Professor Margaret Ann Steinberg	For service to public health and welfare policy through research in the areas of ageing, disability and social justice.	
Morna Sturrock	For service to arts and crafts through the promotion of embroidery, particularly in the field of contemporary ecclesiastical and secular embroidery, and to the community.	
Gail Maree Summers	For service to the community as a foster parent, particularly in providing long-term care to children with disabilities.	
Scientia Professor Peter Lawrence Swan	For service to academia as a scholar and researcher and through contributions to public policy in the fields of economics and finance.	
John Alexander Sweaney	For service to the advancement of the chiropractic profession through professional organisations.	
Associate Professor Paul John Torzillo	For service to medicine as a specialist in respiratory medicine and as a contributor to improving Aboriginal and Torres Strait Islander health.	
Professor Faith Helen Trent	For service to education as an academic, as a contributor in the area of educational reform, and to the community, particularly in the areas of Indigenous and multicultural affairs.	
Paul Trevethan	For service to conservation and the environment as an advocate for improved soil and water management.	
Maria Francesca Venuti	For service to the community as a fundraiser for charitable organisations, particularly those involved with medical research, and as an entertainer.	
Peter John Wall	For service to the wine industry, particularly through technical innovation in viticulture and wine making, the development of Australian wine law, international trade, and vocational education and training.	
Dr Edith Weisberg	For service to medicine, particularly in the areas of women's health, family planning and reproductive health.	
Dr Patrick James Williams	For service to oenology and to flavour science, particularly through research into the compounds affecting wine flavour and ageing potential.	
James Thorpe Woodcock	For service to the mining and minerals industries of Australia through research and development work, as an author and editor of technical publications and as a lecturer and mentor.	
William James Wright	For service to the visual arts as an academic, curator and administrator, and by raising the profile of Australian contemporary artists.	

==== Military Division ====
Branch	Recipient	Citation	Notes
Navy	Captain Richard James Longbottom	For exceptional service to the Australian Defence Force and the Royal Australian Navy in the fields of naval engineering and project management.	
Navy	Commodore Louis Joseph Rago	For exceptional service to the Australian Defence Force and the Royal Australian Navy as the director general personnel plans and as the director general naval personnel and training.	
Navy	Captain Peter John Sinclair	For exceptional service to the Australian Defence Force as Commander Task Group 627.1 enforcing the United Nations sanctions against Iraq as part of Operation SLIPPER.	
Navy	Captain Vincent Morris Thompson	For exceptional service to the Royal Australian Navy through personal commitment and dedication to professional excellence.	
Army	Lieutenant Colonel Wayne Leonard Goodman	For exceptional service to the Australian Army in various Army Headquarters appointments and as the Commanding Officer/Chief Instructor at the School of Artillery.	
Army	Lieutenant Colonel Timothy Adrian Grutzner	For exceptional service to the Australian Army in the field of Military Policing.	
Army	Lieutenant Colonel Anthony Gerard Hambleton	For exceptional service to the Australian Army as the Officer Commanding 26th Transport Squadron and as Staff Officer Grade One, Senior Officer Management within the Directorate of Officer Career Management Army.	
Army	Brigadier Michael Frank Paramor	For exceptional service to the Australian Defence Force and the Australian Army as Chief of Staff of Headquarters Australian Theatre, as the Commandant of the Royal Military College and as the Australian Commander of forces deployed to the Middle East.	
Air Force	Wing Commander Robert Ivan Scrivener CSM	For exceptional service to the Australian Defence Force in the field of aerospace technical training.	

=== Medal (OAM) ===
==== General Division ====
Recipient	Citation	Notes
Dr Marcus Geoffrey Adonis	For service to sports medicine as a medical officer to a range of sporting teams and associations, and to Maccabi Australia.	
Paul Afkos	For service to the Greek Australian community of Western Australia, and to the business sector through a range of commercial organisations.	
Judith Ann Aird	For service to people with disabilities in the Hunter region, particularly through the enhancement and promotion of recreational and employment opportunities.	
Kenneth Robert Allan	For service to sport, particularly softball as an administrator, coach and umpire through the Laverton Softball Club and the Werribee Softball Association.	
Janice Renyra Allitt	For service to the community of Ballarat through a range of organisations, including the Anglican Diocese of Ballarat, Anglicare, Neighbourhood Watch, and the Guiding movement.	
Patricia Thelma Amphlett	For service to the entertainment industry through the Media, Entertainment and Arts Alliance and Actors Equity.	
Jean Eva Anderson	For service to the community of Hughenden, particularly through the Country Women's Association.	
Thelma May Anderson	For service to the community of Penrith, particularly through the Penrith Older Women's Network and the Kingswood Park Community Centre.	
Valda Andrewartha	For service to the community through voluntary activities with the Royal Children's Hospital, Melbourne.	
John Anich	For service to the community of Mossman through aged and youth welfare organisations.	
Anonymous	For service to the community, particularly through St Gabriels School for the Hearing Impaired.	
Anonymous	For service to the community, particularly through the Jacana St Vincent de Paul Centre.	
William Gilbert Astill	For service to the sport of shooting through the Sale Small Bore Rifle Club and the Central and Western Gippsland Rifle Union as an administrator and coach, and to the community.	
David Stuart Atkins	For service to the performing arts as a producer, director and choreographer, and as artistic director and producer of the opening and closing ceremonies for the Sydney 2000 Olympic Games.	
Jack Edgson Aubin	For service to the community of Bathurst, particularly through Rotary International and Meals on Wheels.	
Geoffrey Reginald Bailey	For service to the community through the programs of the Rotary Club of Mitcham.	
Elizabeth Gay Baker	For service to medical research, particularly in the field of human cytogenetics.	
Jacqueline Kendall Baker	For service to ice-skating as an official, administrator and competitor.	
Trevor Leon Bawden	For service to local government, to the welfare of veterans and their families, particularly through the Vietnam Veterans Counselling Service, and to the community through fire fighting organisations.	
Mario Bellantonio	For service to people with disabilities, and to the community of Penrith through a range of charitable and community based organisations.	
Michael John Bendotti	For service to the community of Pemberton as a contributor to the development of health, aged care and sporting facilities.	
Allen George Bennett	For service to the community, particularly through the Cann River Sub Branch of the Returned and Services League of Australia and the Cann River Cemetery Trust.	
Irma Bertrand	For service to the Latvian community of Sydney.	
Julie Teresa Biles	For service to the community of the Australian Capital Territory as an advocate for issues affecting women, aged health and welfare services, and improvements in educational outcomes.	
Maxwell Binning	For service to the community of Fremantle through a range of organisations, including the Western Australian Golf Association, Neighbourhood Watch and the Fremantle Chamber of Commerce.	
The Reverend Joyce Margaret Blazely	For service to the Anglican Church and to the community of Deloraine.	
Albert John Boettcher	For service to science, particularly in the field of physics and electronics as an administrator and regulator, and to the community through the Australian Cancer Research Foundation.	
Margaret Booth	For service to the community, particularly through the establishment of the HMAS Canberra Memorial.	
Anne Victoria Bornstein	For service to the community through the Franciscan Missionary Union.	
Patricia Margaret Bourke	For service to the community of the Australian Capital Territory as a volunteer through a range of church, social support and tourism organisations.	
Nola Frances Braude	For service to the community, particularly through the Temple Emanuel Community Support Group.	
Bernadette Mary Brennan	For service to nursing, particularly in the field of perioperative nursing, as an educator, clinician and contributor to the development of standards for infection control in operating theatres.	
Pamela Mary Le Breton	For service to the community of the Blue Mountains, particularly as a swimming instructor.	
Paul Anthony Briggs	For service to the Indigenous community through a range of organisations in the areas of sport, education, health and employment.	
The Reverend Rodger Samuel Brown	For service to religion, particularly through the Bible Society of Australia and the Uniting Church, and to the community.	
Sari Patricia Browne	For service to the community, particularly the Sydney Legacy Women's Auxiliary and the National Council of Women.	
Barry Eric Bryant	For service as a community and hospital pharmacist and as a contributor to the continuing education of peers, pharmacy students and allied health professionals.	
Frederick Robert Bylett	For service to the community, particularly through the Leukaemia Foundations of Queensland and Australia.	
Victor Joseph Byrne	For service to Rugby League football as an administrator.	
Anne Louise Cahill	For service to the community, particularly as an arts administrator through the Ku-ring-gai Philharmonic Orchestra and The Orchestras of Australia Network.	
Butch Calderwood	For service as a news, current affairs and documentary cinematographer.	
Gordon Norman Cameron	For service to the community of Maffra, particularly through civic leadership.	
Alan Bruce Carlisle	For service to sailing, particularly as an administrator and through the promotion and development of boating safety and standards.	
Edward Roy Carroll	For service to veterans and their families, and to the community of Batesford.	
William Henry Carwardine	For service to conservation and the environment, particularly through the establishment of a range of organisations concerned with the preservation of endangered flora and fauna.	
Ralph Franklyn Cashman	For service to weightlifting, particularly through the New South Wales Weightlifting Association and the Australian Weightlifting Federation.	
Dr Raymond Robert Channells	For service to medicine, particularly as a general practitioner, to photography through the Australian Photographic Society, and to the community of Yeppoon.	
Richard Melchior Cirami	For service to viticulture, particularly through grape vine improvement research.	
Howard Raymond Clark	For service to the community, particularly through the Sydney Tramway Museum.	
Keith Andrew Conlon	For service to tourism in South Australia, particularly through the One and All sailing ship project, and to the community as a contributor to the Adelaide Girls Choir.	
Sister Mary Alice Constable	For service to the community as an advocate for social justice and through the programs of the Sisters of the Good Samaritans.	
Keith Henry Conway	For service to veterans, particularly through the Heidelberg Sub-Section of the Naval Association of Australia.	
Brian Reginald Cook	For service to veterans and their families through the Woden Valley Sub-Branch of the Returned and Services League of Australia and the ACT Veterans Advice and Advocacy Service.	
William Sidney Cooper	For service to rowing as an official and administrator.	
Christine Gladys Coulthard	For service to veterans and their families through a range of ex-Service organisations, and to the community.	
Mary Ann Cowan	For service to nursing in developing countries through programs defining standards and maintenance of care to ensure quality health service delivery.	
Raymond Ian Cowen	For service to the community of the Huon region, and as a member of the Southern Tasmanian Axemens Association.	
Robert Desmond Cox	For service to veterans and their families, particularly through the Vietnam Veterans Association of Australia.	
David Lawrence Creenaune	For service to the community of Byrock, particularly through heritage and wildlife protection and civic beautification projects.	
Michael Stanislaus Cronin	For service to the community of the Australian Capital Territory, particularly through the establishment and administration of a number of Irish associations.	
Kenneth Rupert Curnow	For service to youth through the pony club movement.	
Rex Edward Daly	For service to the community of Moe.	
Beverley Dargin	For service to the community, particularly through the Araluen Aboriginal Corporation.	
Joyce Wilks Davey	For service to the community of the Manning Valley district through a range of organisations, particularly the Manning and District Cancer Action Group and the Taree Quota Club.	
Ronald James Davidson	For service to surf lifesaving as an official, administrator and instructor.	
Kathleen Davie	For service to the community of Strathalbyn through a range of youth, women's, health and local cultural organisations.	
Mary Davies	For service to the community of Rockingham through a range of historical, women's and aged care organisations.	
Beverley Dawn Davis	For service to the community of Bruny Island, particularly through the Bruny Island Historical Society.	
Susan Margery Dethridge	For service to local government through the Bellingen Shire Council, and to the community.	
Arthur James Devin	For service to local government through engineering projects in the Boonah Shire and to the community, particularly through the programs of Rotary International.	
Norman Dixon	For service to the community of the Sutherland Shire through environmental conservation and lifesaving groups.	
Dr Anita Donaldson	For service to the performing arts as a practitioner, teacher and researcher, and through the development of dance studies at the tertiary level.	
Maxwell Keith Drayton	For service to the wine industry in the Hunter Valley, and to the community of Pokolbin.	
Ronda Dawn Drewett	For service to the community of the Morwell region, particularly through the Salvation Army.	
John Bruce Duncan	For service to the community of the Gold Coast, particularly through the Rotary Club of Surfers Paradise.	
Kevin Scott Dunkley	For service to the community of the far north coast of New South Wales, particularly through the Trial Bay Division of the Royal Volunteer Coastal Patrol.	
Mary Dunkley	For service to the community of the far north coast of New South Wales, particularly through the Trial Bay Division of the Royal Volunteer Coastal Patrol.	
Nicholas Kevin Dyer	For service to the community, particularly through Rotary International and Centacare.	
Antony Colin Ednie-Brown	For service to the development of Perth as an architect, particularly through civic design and administration, and to the community.	
Dr Vivian Edward Edwards	For service to the agricultural show movement, particularly through the Royal National Agricultural and Industrial Association of Queensland, and to the community.	
Margaret Elder	For service to the community through health and aged care groups, and to netball.	
Ian Darrell Ellis	For service to the community through research into and documentation of the history of the Upper Hunter.	
Bruce Patrick English	For service to the Margaret River and East Timor communities.	
Margaret Anne English	For service to the Margaret River and East Timor communities.	
Dr John Charles Erlich	For service to medicine in the field of paediatrics, particularly to the Aboriginal communities of central Australia.	
Zelda Marion Feigen	For service to the Jewish community, particularly through the Jewish Centre on Ageing.	
Anthony Reginald Fenelon	For service to music, particularly as an organist and pianist in Australia and overseas.	
Roy Sebiar Ferguson	For service to sailing through Yarra Bay 16 ft Skiff Sailing Club and the New South Wales 16 ft Skiff Association.	
Adjunct Professor Peter Weir Fergusson	For service to tourism and to the wine industry in the Yarra Valley.	
Clarice Margueritta Ferrari	For service to the community of Laidley.	
Avice Mary Filmer	For service to nursing, particularly through the Cann Valley Bush Nursing Centre.	
Eric Morrisby Fisher	For service to conservation and the environment, particularly through the Macquarie Marshes Management Committee, and to the community.	
Gwenyth Gladys Fisher	For service to the community of Marion through the Good Gear Opportunity Shop.	
Lesley Myrtle Fletcher	For service to the community, particularly through the Cairns Branch of the Women's Electoral Lobby, and to education.	
Margaret June Flower	For service to the community, particularly through fundraising for and promotion of aid projects in developing countries.	
Pamela Florence Forsdike	For service to judo as an administrator and official.	
Laurie Walter Fox	For service to motor sport as a competitor and administrator.	
Barry Lionel Fradkin	For service to the Jewish community of Melbourne, particularly through Montefiore Homes for the Aged.	
Pat Frater	For service to the community, particularly through the Cubby House Toy Library for children with special needs and the Aboriginal Support Group - Manly Warringah Pittwater.	
Harold Richmond Fredericks	For service to the community of the northern rivers area of New South Wales, particularly as a contributor to the establishment of a helicopter rescue service.	
Robert Douglas Freebairn	For service as an agronomist and researcher, particularly in the areas of pasture improvement and agricultural sustainability, and to the community of Coonabarabran.	
Athol Gwynne Frewin	For service to veterans and their families, particularly through the Gosford Sub-Branch of the Returned and Services League of Australia.	
Nona Blachford Frewin	For service to the community, particularly as a member of the Pink Ladies at Hornsby Hospital.	
Denise Friedman	For service to animal welfare, particularly through the Wildlife Information and Rescue Service.	
Eileen Emily Frith	For service to the community of Rockingham, particularly in the field of amateur theatre.	
Ronald Keith Fuller	For service to the community of the Port Lincoln area.	
Walter Maxwell Fuller	For service to the community of Cootamundra, particularly through the Garden Club.	
Kenneth Bruce Fullerton	For service to sport, particularly through the BeeGees Soccer Club.	
Susanne Fullerton	For service to sport, particularly through the BeeGees Soccer Club.	
Frances Veronica Galvin	For service to the community, particularly people with a disability, in the Shires of Campaspe and Murray.	
Alessandro Gardini	For service to the community as a contributor to the development of a multicultural society in South Australia.	
Clarice May Gaul	For service to veterans and their families, particularly through the Women's Auxiliary of the Wollongong Sub-Branch of the Returned and Services League of Australia.	
Edwin James Gay	For service to the hardware industry and to the community of Ballarat.	
Betty Jewel Gibbins	For service to the community, particularly through the Maroba Nursing Home.	
Maureen June Gilbertson	For service to the community, particularly through ministry and coordination of services to people with intellectual disability.	
Councillor Roderick James Gilmour	For service to local government and to the community of Miles.	
Anna Goodrich	For service to the community, particularly through the Sir Moses Montefiore Jewish Home, and the Jewish Communal Appeal.	
Jennifer Anne Gore	For service in the field of enamelling as a practitioner and teacher, and as a promoter of Australian enamel artistry.	
Robert William Gorick	For service to the development and promotion of junior Rugby League football.	
David Barclay Gove	For service to the community of the Riverina region through water management, business development, employment generation and tourism organisations.	
Jennifer Jane Gowing	For service to the community of Winton through health, aged care, church and women's organisations.	
Kathleen Elizabeth Graham	For service to the development of men's artistic gymnastics.	
Richard Barrie Greenup	For service to the community, particularly through the Queensland Society of Crippled Children.	
Eileen Monica Gunther	For service to the Guiding movement.	
Francis Edgar Hack	For service to Australian automotive history through the restoration of vintage and veteran cars and motorcycles.	
Richard James Hale	For service to the community as a human rights advocate, particularly through promoting the rights of gay and lesbian people in Tasmania.	
Keith Maurice Hamann	For service to mathematics education.	
Eli Hambour	For service to the community of Kapunda.	
Maisie Evalene Hardy	For service to the community of Balmain.	
Dr Ian Arnold Harmstorf	For service to the community, particularly through the preservation and promotion of the history of South Australians of German heritage.	
Alwyn Ecucene Harrip	For service to the community of Isis, particularly through the Isis Sub-Branch of the Returned and Services League of Australia.	
Richard Stephen Hawkins	For service to the community of the Mornington Peninsula and to the boating fraternity, particularly through the publication of books to assist in navigating local waters.	
Dr Anne Hazell	For service to librarianship in Australia, particularly as an advocate for teacher-librarianship and the development of school libraries.	
Robert John Herd	For service to naval architecture and ship safety, and to the community through the 'Polly Woodside' Maritime Museum.	
Joanne Elizabeth Hermann	For service to the community, particularly through the South Australian Arthritis Foundation and the Lutheran Church.	
Eunice Prim Hill	For service to the community of the Gold Coast, particularly through the Australian Pensioners and Superannuants League.	
Kenneth Robert Hodges	For service to sport through the Modern Pentathlon movement, and to youth through the New South Wales Police and Community Youth Club.	
Gwen Lynette Hole	For service to the community of the Gold Coast.	
Helen Margaret Holmes	For service to the community, particularly through the Sandy Bay Rotary Club.	
Sister Mercedes Houghton	For service to the community as a music teacher.	
Lennard David Humphreys	For service to the community as a dance teacher.	
Pamela Fay Humphreys	For service to the community as a dance teacher.	
Marie Ellen Hurley	For service to the communities of the lower Blue Mountains and Penrith, and to nursing through the Nepean Hospital.	
Josephine Louise Hutton	For service to international humanitarian aid.	
Wladyslawa Jadczak	For service to the Polish community of South Australia.	
George Albert James	For service to the veterans and families of the 450 Squadron (RAAF) Association.	
Janette Ruth James	For service to youth, particularly through the Guiding movement, and to the community of Tenterfield.	
Dean James Jeffries	For service to the community, particularly through the Payneham City Concert Band.	
Angelo Luigi Job	For service to veterans and their families through the Unione Nazionale Italiana Reduci di Russia Association.	
George Macarthur Job	For service to the promotion and advancement of aviation safety.	
The Reverend Canon Boak Alexander Jobbins	For service to religion, particularly through the diocese of Sydney, and to the community.	
Barry George Johnson	For service to primary industry, particularly the promotion of the horticultural export industry in Queensland.	
Marie Carmella Johnson	For service to the community, particularly through church, aged care and social support groups.	
Roger Richard Jones	For service to the community, particularly as an advocate for improved services for people with anxiety disorders.	
Joan Mary Kellett	For service to swimming as an administrator and official, and to the community.	
Councillor Leo Henry Kelly	For service to local government and to the community of Blacktown.	
Patricia Doolan Kennedy	For service to the community as an advocate for people with HIV/AIDS, particularly through the provision of support services.	
Colleen Patricia Keys	For service to the community through the Horizon Committee of the Royal Institute for Deaf and Blind Children.	
Barbara Mary Kilpatrick	For service to the community, particularly as an advocate for women and children affected by domestic violence.	
Stanley King	For service to primary industry through the promotion and adoption of sustainable agricultural methods, particularly as a pioneer of the use of the pasture legume, seradella.	
Frederick Samuel Kirkwood	For service to the community of Mount Kembla, particularly to former mine workers.	
Gregory Edward Klein	For service to the community, particularly through the administration of the Civil Law Legal Aid Scheme, and as Public Trustee of Queensland.	
Wilma Florence Knowles	For service to the community, particularly through the Victoria Police Blue Ribbon Foundation and the Neighbourhood Watch program.	
Keith Eric Kranz	For service to the community, particularly through the Alzheimers Association of Australia.	
Oliver Nicholas Landers	For service to local government and to the community of Aramac	
Ian Philip Landsmeer	For service to the community of Bencubbin through a range of local government, primary industry, environmental, social support and sporting organisations.	
Richard Albert Larriera	For service to the community of Geraldton, particularly through the establishment of the HMAS Sydney II Memorial.	
Goffrey George Larwood	For service to the community of Prospect through sporting, church and social support groups.	
Laurence James Lassig	For service to people with disabilities, particularly through the Cerebral Palsy League of Queensland.	
Colin John Laughlin	For service to the community of the Illawarra region, particularly through the promotion and education of the surf lifesaving movement in the use of jet and inflatable rescue boats.	
John Kenneth Leary	For service to the community of Campbelltown, particularly through the Campbelltown City Show Society and the Campbelltown-Koshigaya Sister Cities Association.	
Maxwell Curnow Lee	For service to the community, particularly through the preservation of the Changi Prisoner of War Chapel.	
Robert Ivor Lee	For service to the community through the Scouting movement and the University of the Third Age.	
The Reverend Canon Ernest Albert Lemmon	For service to the communities of Cloncurry, Julia Creek and Mount Isa through the pastoral care, social support and aged care programs of the Anglican Church.	
Hayley Jane Lewis	For service to swimming as a competitor and to the community.	
Salvatore Liistro	For service to the Italian community and to people with disabilities.	
Mavis Greenslade Lindsey	For service to the community of Scarborough, particularly through the Scarborough Uniting Activity Centre.	
Francis Thomas Long	For service to the community of Ashgrove through a range of groups providing social support, assistance to people with disabilities and aged care.	
Audrey Claire Lord	For service to the community, particularly through the Royal Adelaide Hospital Auxiliary, the Anglican Church and care for the ageing.	
Joan Lovell Lundy	For service to the community of the Hunter region.	
Stephen Noble Lundy	For service to the community of the Hunter region.	
Lieutenant Commander George Jenkins Mackenzie	For service to the community of Shoalhaven, particularly to people with disabilities.	
Thomas Joseph Madill	For service to the community of Gympie through a range of church, service and sporting organisations.	
Leonainie Ethel Magnusson	For service to youth through the publication and distribution of the One Jump Ahead magazine.	
Gloria Mary Mahoney	For service to the community through the Monash Volunteer Resource Centre.	
The Reverend John Mallison	For service to the community, particularly through the Uniting Church of Australia.	
Isabelle Rae Mann	For service to the community, particularly through children's film and television, through issues affecting women, and through music.	
Daisy Maybelle Marles	For service to the historical heritage of Adelaide, particularly through the West Torrens Historical Society, and to the community.	
The Reverend David John Marr	For service as Chaplain to the South Australian Police and to the community.	
Alfred Anthony Marsh	For service to veterans and their families through the Ashfield Sub-Branch of the Returned and Services League of Australia and the Ashfield RSL Club.	
Kirstie Claire Marshall	For service to skiing as a competitor, adviser and administrator.	
Annette Marie Marskell	For service to the community, particularly through the Catholic parish of Randwick.	
Eric Allan Martin	For service to the community of Riverstone, particularly through local football and bowling clubs.	
Nedjelko Maruncic	For service to the Croatian community through the Croatian Club 'Jadran-Hajduk' and the United Croatian Clubs of New South Wales and the Australian Capital Territory.	
Patrice Mary Maude	For service to the community, particularly through Transplant Australia.	
Kerrie Anne McArdle	For service to the community, particularly through the Schizophrenia Fellowship of NSW.	
Sean Francis McArdle	For service to the community, particularly through the Schizophrenia Fellowship of NSW.	
Alexander Nigel McCleave	For service to the community, particularly through Life Education Victoria.	
Stewart John McCoullough	For service to the community, particularly through the Hills District Historical Society.	
Laurence Mathieson McCowan	For service to the international community through Compassion Australia.	
Olive Mary McCowan	For service to the international community through Compassion Australia.	
John Robert McCready	For service to the community of Frankston and to youth, particularly through Menzies Inc.	
Margaret McDonald	For service to the community, particularly through the Marion Craft Group.	
Margaret Judith McDonald	For service to the community as an advocate for social justice in adoption policies and practice.	
Dr Myles McGregor-Lowndes	For service to the community by providing education and support in legal, financial and administrative matters to non-profit organisations.	
Colleen McIntosh	For service to the community through support for young people and the programs of church and social support organisations.	
David James McIntosh	For service to the community through support for young people and the programs of church and social support organisations.	
Dr Marilyn Anne McKenzie	For service to veterinary science, particularly through commitment to the maintenance of standards in the profession.	
Rhonda Mary McKenzie	For service to the community of St Arnaud.	
Theresa Vera McLennan	For service to the community of Proserpine, particularly through local government, and to education.	
Ines McLeod	For service to the communities of Silverton and Broken Hill.	
Ellen Mary McMurtrie	For service to veterans and their families, particularly through the Queensland Division of the War Widows Guild of Australia, and to the community.	
Daniel Patrick McNamara	For service to the community of Port Kembla, particularly through environment and landcare groups.	
Peter Alexander McPhee	For service to the community of the Goulburn Valley, particularly through ex-Service, charitable and sporting organisations.	
Norman John McVicker	For service to the performing arts, particularly theatre, and to the community of Mudgee.	
Margaret Medley	For service to the community of Mount Isa through the preservation of local heritage sites, and to youth through the Guiding movement.	
Carole Millar	For service to children with cancer and their families, particularly through Camp Quality, and to the community.	
Edna Josephine Mitchell	For service to the community, particularly Blacktown, and through the Women's Club of Sydney and the New South Wales Branch of the Royal Commonwealth Society.	
Lorraine Joy Monshing	For service to the community of the Wangaratta region, particularly through amateur theatre.	
Joan Elizabeth Montgomery	For service to veterans and their families through the Vietnam Veterans Counselling Service, and to emergency service personnel in Tasmania through the Tasmanian Critical Incident Stress Management Team.	
Anthony Thomas Mooney	For service to the community, particularly through the Cowra Australia Japan Society and the Cowra Japanese Garden.	
Bruce Robin Morey	For service to the community, particularly through the Sandybeach Centre.	
Diane Christine Morris	For service to the community, particularly as a contributor to organisations promoting women's, children's and family health and welfare.	
Garry John Morris	For service to the community, particularly as a fundraiser for a range of charitable organisations, special schools and hospitals, and for people with special needs.	
Valerie Ann Morrison	For service to netball as an administrator, player, coach and umpire.	
Terence Murphy	For service to lawn bowls as a player, administrator and official.	
Janine Irving Murray	For service to the community, particularly through the Gumeracha District Soldiers Memorial Hospital Day Centre.	
Ann Catherine Neill	For service to the community through Anglicare, St Lukes Careforce at Mosman and Meals on Wheels.	
Vera Newsom	For service to literature as a poet and through support for the emerging talent of other writers.	
Maureen Denise Newsum	For service to children with cancer and their families, particularly through Camp Quality.	
Gwen Catherine Nicholson	For service to the community of Rylstone, particularly through establishing the Anglicare Opportunity Shop, and to the Country Women's Association.	
John Edward Nolan	For service to people with disabilities, particularly as an advocate for access to community facilities.	
Wendy Lynette Nolan	For service to people with disabilities, particularly as an advocate for access to community facilities.	
William Edward Norman	For service to the community as a volunteer with the Society of St Vincent de Paul.	
Stanley Nowak	For service to engineering as a consultant and educator, and to the community, particularly in the area of aged care.	
James Brendon Nugent	For service to the community of the Moree district through a range of veteran, service and rural support organisations.	
Kenneth John O'Brien	For service to the community of New Norfolk through veteran, service and local history groups.	
Mary Wallace O'Dwyer	For service to early childhood education, particularly as Principal of the Taverners Hill Infants School.	
Patrick John O'Keeffe	For service to veterans and their families, to the preservation of Australian military heritage, and to the community.	
Norman Clifford O'Neill	For service to cricket as a player and coach.	
William John O'Neill	For service to the community of South Gippsland, particularly through the Rotary Club of Korumburra and as a supporter of the Coal Creek Heritage Village.	
Ronald Douglas O'Mullane	For service to the community of Moree through a range of heritage, arts, health and sporting groups.	
John Desmond Ogilvie	For service to surf lifesaving as an administrator and coach.	
Geoffrey Wilson Oliver	For service to the community of Ballarat, particularly through the promotion of the Pyrenees region as a wine producing area, and through involvement with health and educational groups.	
Mary Evelyn Le Page	For service to music education as a teacher, accompanist and mentor for students.	
John Parnell	For service to the community, particularly through the Society of St Vincent de Paul and the Scouting movement.	
Herbert Kitchener Paterson	For service to the community of the Illawarra region, particularly through the Rotary Club of Wollongong and the Freemasonry movement.	
Brian Henry Pattinson	For service to the community, particularly through the Rotary Club of Dubbo West.	
Dr Christopher Ross Philpot	For service to medicine, particularly as a contributor to improving sexual health service provision and training.	
Peter Ian Philpott	For service to cricket as a player, coach and commentator, and to the community.	
Marilyn Rosalie Pidgeon	For service to state and local politics as an administrator, to local government, and to the community of the New England region.	
Kenneth Erle Pogson	For service to the community of Moss Vale, particularly through Meals on Wheels and the programs of the Rotary Club of Moss Vale.	
Dr Mikls John Pohl	For service to international humanitarian aid through the activities of Interplast Australia, to music, and to the community.	
Doris Beryl Poole	For service to the community, particularly through the Balldale and Corowa Branches of the Country Women's Association.	
Lorna Margaret Porter	For service to the community of Mirboo North, and to youth through the Scouting movement.	
James Lindsay Potter	For service to the community, particularly through the Salisbury and District Historical Society.	
Fay Margaret Powell	For service to the community of Berwick, particularly through groups providing child and family support.	
Dorothy Francis Prescott	For service to map librarianship and cartobibiliography.	
John Frederick Pressler	For service to primary industry in Queensland, particularly as a horticulturalist.	
Joyce Helen Primrose	For service to the community, particularly through the St George Lantern Club.	
Harold William Quinlan	For service to the communities of Ryde and Eastwood.	
Arthur Charles Radford	For service to the community of Latrobe through a range of service, sporting, veteran and emergency organisations.	
Dorothy May Radford	For services to the community of Penrith, particularly through veteran, youth and aged care groups.	
William Henry Radford	For service to veterans and their families, particularly through the Manning River Branch of the Royal Australian Air Force Association.	
Neville Farley Read	For service to the welfare of veterans and their families.	
Philip Kimble Read	For service to engineering, particularly in the areas of hydraulics and hydrology.	
Raymond Clemence Reichelt	For service to nature conservation, particularly Malleefowl, and to the development of regional and eco-tourism in Victoria.	
David Lyle Richards	For service to cricket as an administrator.	
Idwall Charles Richards	For service to the community through a number of service and sporting organisations in the Tweed Heads region.	
Russell James Richards	For service to the community, particularly through the Canberra Presbytery of the Uniting Church in Australia.	
Sanya Yvonne Ritchie	For service to hockey as a player, official and administrator, and to the community through church and service organisations.	
The Reverend David Oswald Robarts	For service to religion, particularly through the Anglican Church of Australia.	
David Frank Robbins	For service to veterans and their families, particularly as an advocate, and to the community.	
Joan Ellen Roberts	For service to the community as an administrator of aged care organisations.	
George Rivirs Robson	For service to sailing, particularly through the New South Wales 16 ft Skiff Association and Drummoyne Sailing Club.	
Maria Maddalena Roncan	For service to people with disabilities in the La Trobe Valley area.	
Phyl Den Ronden	For service to the community through Citizens Against Road Slaughter.	
Kathleen Lehmann Rooney	For service to animal welfare through the Animal Welfare League of South Australia.	
Sydney John Rooth	For service to the community of the mid-north coast of New South Wales, particularly in the areas of mental health, disability, and child protection.	
Michael James Rowlands	For service to the community of Mudgee, particularly as a contributor to the provision of special education services and outdoor education facilities.	
Russell Alan Roylance	For service to the community of the Tweed Heads region and to the registered club industry.	
Derek Thomas Russell	For service to the community of Padstow.	
John Llewellyn Sabourne	For service to local government and to the community of Harvey through a range of service and sporting organisations.	
Lorrel Margaret Samson	For service to youth through the Scouting movement and to the community of Traralgon.	
Ronald John Sandstrom	For service to surf lifesaving as an administrator, coach and official.	
Lieutenant Colonel Thomas Clem Sargent	For service to the community, particularly through the Military Historical Society of Australia.	
Elinor May Scammell	For service to people with disabilities through Mirradong Services and to the community of Yarram.	
Dr Margaret Anne Scharp	For service to nursing as an educator and administrator, particularly in relation to the transfer of nurse education to higher education institutions in Victoria.	
Professor Wendy Elizabeth Schiller	For service to early childhood education, particularly through the establishment of the Hunter Caravan Project and Play-Gym program.	
Neville Warren Schrader	For service to conservation and the environment, particularly as a field naturalist and ornithologist.	
Sister Patricia Joan Sexton	For service to secondary and tertiary education as an educator and administrator, and to the community through the Sisters of the Good Samaritan.	
Freda Irene Shaw	For service to the community of the Tweed Heads region through sporting, social welfare and recreational groups.	
Brigadier John Arthur Sheldrick	For service to veterans and their families, particularly through the Returned and Services League of Australia.	
Robert Mervyn Sheppeard	For service to the community of Ashford, particularly as a fundraiser for aged care, sporting and other charitable groups.	
Rita Maud Shortland	For service to the community, particularly through the South Australian Women's Information Service.	
Kathy Romy Silard	For service to the community, particularly as an advocate for and supporter of sole parents and their children.	
John Peter Sivyer	For service to the community, particularly through the programs of Rotary and Apex.	
Benjamin Slonim	For service to the Jewish community through cultural, social and educational activities.	
The Reverend Brother Colin Declan Smith	For service to education and to the community through the Catholic Church and in the field of liturgical music.	
Gilbert Walter Smith	For service to veterans and their families, particularly through the Beresfield Sub-Branch of the Returned and Services League of Australia.	
Norma Jean Smith	For service to the community, particularly through the Revesby Workers Club and Bankstown City Netball Association.	
Patricia Ann Smith	For service to the community of the Sunshine Coast area through a range of veterans organisations.	
Ronald Mervyn Smith	For service to veterans and their families, particularly through the Castle Hill Sub-Branch of the Returned and Services League of Australia.	
John Carlyle Southwell	For service to the community of Camden through a range of aged care, service and veteran groups.	
Arthur Henry Stacey	For service to cricket as a player, coach and administrator.	
Edna Iona Stack	For service to the communities of Portland and Lithgow through a range of women's, church, aged care and youth groups.	
Envoy Alan Colvin Staines	For service to young people through Suicide Prevention Australia and the Salvation Army.	
Elizabeth Stamell	For service to the Greek community, particularly through the Greek Young Matrons Association.	
Laurence Frederick Stanley	For service to people with intellectual disabilities, particularly through Orana Inc.	
Jock Statton	For service to veterans and their families, particularly through the South Australian Branch of the Returned and Services League of Australia.	
Ernest Benjamin Stephens	For service to surf lifesaving as an official, instructor and administrator.	
Fergus Ian Stevenson	For service to veterans and to the community, particularly through the Merrylands Sub-Branch of the Returned and Services League of Australia and the Merrylands RSL Club.	
Elizabeth Anne Stewart	For service to the community, particularly through the Menieres Support Group of New South Wales Inc.	
Neil Stewart	For service to the community of Wangaratta.	
John Rendle Stock	For service to children and young people through the Morialta Trust.	
Sydney Nelson Stocks	For service to the community of Blackbutt.	
Robert Owen Stockwell	For service to the community of Blackall, particularly through the Barcoo Retirement Village.	
Neville David Symonds	For service to Rugby League football, particularly through the Bondi United Rugby League Club, and to the community of Bondi.	
Jean Rae Tanzer	For service to the community through the Catholic Church, particularly in the area of services affecting women.	
Lorna Emblem Tennant	For service to the community through the Royal Newcastle Hospital Pink Ladies Volunteer Association.	
Yvonne Mary Tester	For service to the community of Fiji through arranging collection and distribution of donated goods to families.	
Kandiah Thangarajah	For service to the community, particularly the Tamil community of Melbourne.	
Albert Neville Thiele	For service to audio engineering, particularly in the field of loud speaker design and the development of audio engineering standards.	
Terrence Roy Thompson	For service to motor sport and to the preservation of vintage and veteran cars as an administrator and race competitor.	
Jean Thomson	For service to the community, particularly through the Guiding movement.	
Shirley Rae Tinney	For service to netball as an administrator, manager and coach, and to the community of Caboolture.	
Nicholas Francis Toonen	For service to the community as a human rights advocate, particularly through promoting the rights of gay and lesbian people.	
Charles Loftus Tottenham	For service to the community, particularly through support for recreational freshwater angling.	
Graeme Whitby Townsend	For service to veterans and their families, particularly through the City of Albury Sub-Branch of the Returned and Services League of Australia.	
Janice Lilian Treloar	For service to the community of Tamworth, particularly through Meals on Wheels.	
Kenneth James Trevallion	For service to the community through We Help Ourselves and the Myalgic Encephalomyelitis/Chronic Fatigue Syndrome Society of New South Wales.	
Warren Herbert Turton	For service to the community of the Australian Capital Territory through a range of service, social welfare and educational organisations.	
Lyle Oscar Tyler	For service to softball as an administrator and an umpire.	
The Reverend Dr Gloster Stuart Udy	For service to the community, particularly through Lifeline and the Parramatta Regional Methodist Mission.	
Orlando Ricardo Vargas	For service to the Filipino community.	
Beryl Beatrice Vayro	For service to the community of Wynnum through a range of women's, youth and sporting organisations.	
Erno Peter Vecsey-Dalos	For service to the community through promoting the benefits of cultural diversity, and to the elderly through Meals on Wheels.	
Nils-Erik Bertil Vejby	For service to the community, particularly the Scandinavian community, through the Swedish Church of Melbourne and the Rotary Club of Werribee.	
Serge Voloschenko	For service to multiculturalism and to the Russian community in Queensland.	
Allan Neville Voysey	(Award wef 21 November 2001) For service to the community of Shoalhaven Heads.	
John Hugh Walker	For service to the hospitality and tourism industries and to vocational education and training in New South Wales.	
Laura Grace Walker	For service to lawn bowls as a player, administrator and official, and to the community of Penguin.	
Raema Jean Walker	For service to the communities of Lidcombe and Auburn through a range of youth welfare, health, historical and environmental organisations.	
Peter Garth Walmsley	For service to the community, particularly through the brass band movement.	
Wu Chao-Fong Wang	For service to the community, particularly as a fundraiser for charitable organisations and medical research.	
Judith Anne Warren	For service to children with cancer and their families, particularly through Camp Quality.	
Alan Holmes Washbourne	For service to the environment, particularly through enhancement and bushcare programs, and to the preservation of the Illawarra regions cultural heritage.	
Margaret Everina Waterhouse	For service to the community, particularly as an advocate for human rights and reconciliation.	
Dr Howard Charles Watts	For service to medicine as a general practitioner and to professional development through the Royal Australian College of General Practitioners.	
Desmond Robert Whitmarsh	For service to the community of Ceduna.	
Florence May Wilkinson	For service to sport, particularly tennis, as a player, administrator and coach.	
Edith Isabel Williams	For service to the community, particularly through the Royal Association of Justices of South Australia and the Royal Society for the Blind.	
Mary Rose Williams	For service to the community as a foster carer of children and infants with disabilities and special needs.	
Noel Kenneth Wilson	For service to local government and to the community of Townsville, particularly through sporting organisations.	
Barbara Louisa Wolff	For service to community health, particularly through organisations supporting people affected by Acoustic Neuroma.	
Geoffrey Benjamin Woods	For service to the community through cultural, heritage, service and sporting organisations, and to local government.	
Peter Michael Worsley	For service to rifle-shooting as a competitor, and to developmental geospatial information systems for natural disaster assessment and management.	
William Thomas Wright	For service to the community of Kempsey through a range of church, welfare, service and sporting groups.	
Richard Charles Young	For service to the community of Huskisson, particularly through the Lady Denman Museum Complex and the Bush Fire Brigade.	
Abram Zeleznikow	For service to the Jewish community of Victoria, particularly through Jewish Care.	
Masha Zeleznikow	For service to the Jewish community of Victoria, particularly through Jewish Care.	

==== Military Division ====
Branch	Recipient	Citation	Notes
Navy	Lieutenant Thomas Anthony Lewis	For meritorious service to the Royal Australian Navy, particularly in the promotion of Australian naval history.	
Navy	Warrant Officer Bradley John Whitford	For meritorious service to the Royal Australian Navy as the Project Manager of the Marine Engineering Manpower Restructure on ANZAC Class ships.	
Army	Warrant Officer Class One David Malcolm Ashley	For meritorious service to the Australian Army as the Regimental Sergeant Major of the 6th Battalion, The Royal Australian Regiment and as the 6th Battalion, The Royal Australian Regiment Group Sergeant Major.	
Army	Warrant Officer Class One Mark Anthony Barber	For meritorious service to the Australian Army as the Regimental Sergeant Major of the 9th Brigade Administrative Support Battalion, as the acting Regimental Sergeant Major in the 9th Brigade, as Warrant Officer Logistics on Operation TANAGER, and as the Regimental Sergeant Major in the 3rd Combat Service Support Battalion.	
Army	Warrant Officer Class One Ian David Barnes	For meritorious service to the Australian Army as the Divisional Electrical Mechanical Engineer Warrant Officer in Australia and on Operation WARDEN, and as the senior Electrical Mechanical Engineer Warrant Officer in 3rd Brigade, 3rd Combat Service Support Battalion.	
Army	Warrant Officer Class One Grahame Colin Blackwell	For meritorious service to the Australian Army as the Regimental Sergeant Major of the 1st Health Support Battalion and the 2nd Force Support Battalion.	
Army	Warrant Officer Class Two Jamie Ronald Collidge	For meritorious service to the Australian Defence Force while deployed with the Australian National Command Element in the Middle East during Operation SLIPPER.	
Army	Warrant Officer Class Two Alan Russell Green	For meritorious service to the Australian Army as an Army Public Relations photographer in warlike, operational and non-operational environments.	
Army	Commissioner Norman Rex Liddell	For meritorious service to the Australian Defence Force as the Liverpool Military Area Salvation Army Red Shield Defence Services Representative.	
Army	Chaplain Glynn Thomas Murphy	For meritorious service to the Australian Army as Chaplain of the 2nd Battalion, The Royal Australian Regiment, and the Senior Co-ord Chaplain at Headquarters 3rd Brigade.	
Army	Signalman Matthew Garry Rogers	For meritorious service to the Australian Defence Force while employed on satellite telecommunications duties aboard HMAS MANOORA during Operation SLIPPER.	
Army	Major Johannes Antonius Vanzwol	For meritorious service to the Australian Army in the field of Officer and Non-Commissioned Officer Training.	
Air Force	Squadron Leader Trevor Edward Bidgood	For meritorious service to the Australian Defence Force in the field of aviation airworthiness management and policy development.	
Air Force	Warrant Officer Peter Cyril Hind	For meritorious service to the Royal Australian Air Force in the field of personnel administration as a Warrant Officer Disciplinary and as the Chief of Air Forces advocate for F-111 maintenance staff.	
Air Force	Flight Sergeant Timothy Paul Lempriere	For meritorious service to the Australian Defence Force in the field of medical assistant development and training.	
Air Force	Warrant Officer Ian Campbell Macgregor	For meritorious service to the Royal Australian Air Force as Number 33 Squadron Flight Engineer Leader and Resident Flight Engineer of the B707 Simulator Project Office.	
Air Force	Squadron Leader Roger Gilmour Walter	For meritorious service to the Royal Australian Air Force as a Boeing 707 Qualified Flying Instructor for Number 33 Squadron.	
