= David Faulkner =

David Faulkner may refer to:

- Dave Faulkner (musician) (born 1957), Australian rock musician
- David Faulkner (civil servant) (1934–2020), British criminologist
- David Faulkner (field hockey) (born 1963), British field hockey player
- David Faulkner (footballer) (born 1975), English footballer
- David Faulkner (judoka), American judoka
- David Faulkner, former leader of Newcastle City Council 2010–2011

== See also ==
- Sir David Falconer (1640–1685), Scottish judge
- David Falconer, 3rd Lord Falconer of Halkerton (1668–1724)
- David Falconer, 4th Lord Falconer of Halkerton (1681–1751)
- Faulkner (surname)
