= Charles Faulkner =

Charles Faulkner may refer to:

- Charles Faulkner (author) (born 1952), American life coach, motivational speaker, trader and writer
- Charles Draper Faulkner (1890–1979), American architect
- Charles J. Faulkner (1806–1884), American politician
- Charles James Faulkner (1847–1929), American politician, son of the above
- Charles Joseph Faulkner (1833–1892), mathematician and fellow of University College, Oxford, and founding partner of Morris, Marshall, Faulker & Co.
- Charles H. Faulkner (1937–2022), American archaeologist and anthropologist
- Charles Hugh Branston Faulkner (1916–1997), founder and director of the British charity Help the Aged
- C. W. Faulkner (Charles William Faulkner), printer and publisher of cards and games
- Chuck Faulkner (1922–2000), Northern Irish–born Australian actor and US radio talk show host

== See also ==
- Charlie Faulkner (Anthony George Faulkner, 1941–2023), British rugby union player
