= George Faulkner (disambiguation) =

George Faulkner (c. 1703–1775) was an Irish printer and publisher.

George Faulkner may also refer to:

- George Faulkner (cricketer) (born c. 1793), English cricketer
- George Faulkner (footballer) (1900–1969), Australian rules footballer
- George Faulkner (manufacturer) (1790–1862), supposed originator of the foundation of Owens College, Manchester
- George Everett Faulkner (1855–1931), Canadian politician
- George W. Faulkner (1874–1944), American politician, mayor of Pittsfield, Massachusetts
- George Aubrey Faulkner (1881–1930), cricketer for South Africa
- George Faulkner (ice hockey) (1933–2025), Canadian ice hockey player
- George Faulkner (wrestler), British Olympic wrestler

== See also ==
- George Faulkner Wetherbee (1851–1920), painter
