= Hugh Faulkner =

Hugh Faulkner may refer to:

- Hugh Faulkner (politician), Canadian politician
- Hugh Faulkner (doctor), British doctor
- Charles Hugh Branston Faulkner, known as Hugh, founding director of Help the Aged

== See also ==
- Hugh Falconer, Scottish botanist and geologist
- Faulkner (surname)
