= Neil Faulkner =

Neil Faulkner may refer to:

- Neil Faulkner (archaeologist) (1958–2022), British archaeologist
- Neil Faulkner (painter) (born 1962), British painter

== See also ==
- Faulkner (surname)
