= Roderick Carnegie =

Australian businessman (1932–2024)

Sir Roderick Howard Carnegie AC (27 November 1932 – 14 July 2024) was an Australian businessman, primarily working in the coal industry.

== Life and career ==
Carnegie was born in Melbourne on 27 November 1932, the eldest child and only son of Douglas and Margaret Carnegie (née Allen). He was educated at Geelong Grammar, Trinity College at the University of Melbourne (B.Sc. 1954), Oxford (M.A. and Dip. Ag. Ec. 1957) and Harvard (M.B.A. 1959). In the late 1950s, he was president of the Oxford University Boat Club.

In 1958, he became a consultant with McKinsey & Company Inc. in the United States. In 1963, he founded the Australian practice of McKinsey in Melbourne and, in 1967, he returned to New York to become a Director of the company. In 1972, he joined CRA Limited (now Rio Tinto) as finance director, and served as managing director, and as chairman, from 1974 to 1986.

After 1986, he was a director of several companies, including the Australian Advisory Board of General Motors, the CSIRO, the Business Council of Australia, and the Group of Thirty, and was chairman of the Advisory Committee on Relations with Japan.

In the 1978 Queen's Birthday Honours, Carnegie was created a Knight Bachelor "In recognition of service to industry" and, in the 2003 Queen's Birthday Honours, he was awarded Companion of the Order of Australia "in recognition of service to the promotion of innovative leadership and to the development of competitive practices in business, both national and international, and to the community, particularly in the health and arts fields." He was also awarded a Centenary Medal "for service to Australian society in resource development and management".

His business activities included the chairmanship of Pacific Edge Group.

Carnegie was a Fellow of Trinity College, Melbourne, and he served as patron of the Australian Centre for Blood Diseases. He was also member of the Saltbush Club, a group that promotes climate change denial.

Carnegie died on 14 July 2024, at the age of 91.

== Honours and awards ==

Companion of the Order of Australia (AC)	9 June 2003
Knight Bachelor	3 June 1978
Centenary Medal	1 January 2001

== Publications ==
- Carnegie, Sir Rod (1980). "1980 Sir Walter Murdoch Lecture - Reality, Risk, Relevance: A Choice Path for the Eighties". Murdoch University.
