= James Faulkner =

James Faulkner may refer to:

- James Faulkner (actor) (born 1948), British television and film actor
- James Faulkner (cricketer) (born 1990), Australian cricketer
- James Faulkner (Livingston County, New York) (1790–1884), New York politician
- James Faulkner Jr. (1833–1909), New York assemblyman 1875, in 98th New York State Legislature
- James H. Faulkner (1916–2008), American media owner, education supporter, industrial recruiter, and politician
- James W. Faulkner (1863–1923), American journalist
- Jim Faulkner (1899–1962), American baseball player
- James Albert Faulkner (1877–1944), Canadian medical practitioner and politician
- James Hugh Faulkner (politician) (1933–2016), Canadian politician

== See also ==
- Faulkner (surname)
