= Golden Lane, London =

Street in the City of London

Coordinates: 51.5236°N 0.09597°W

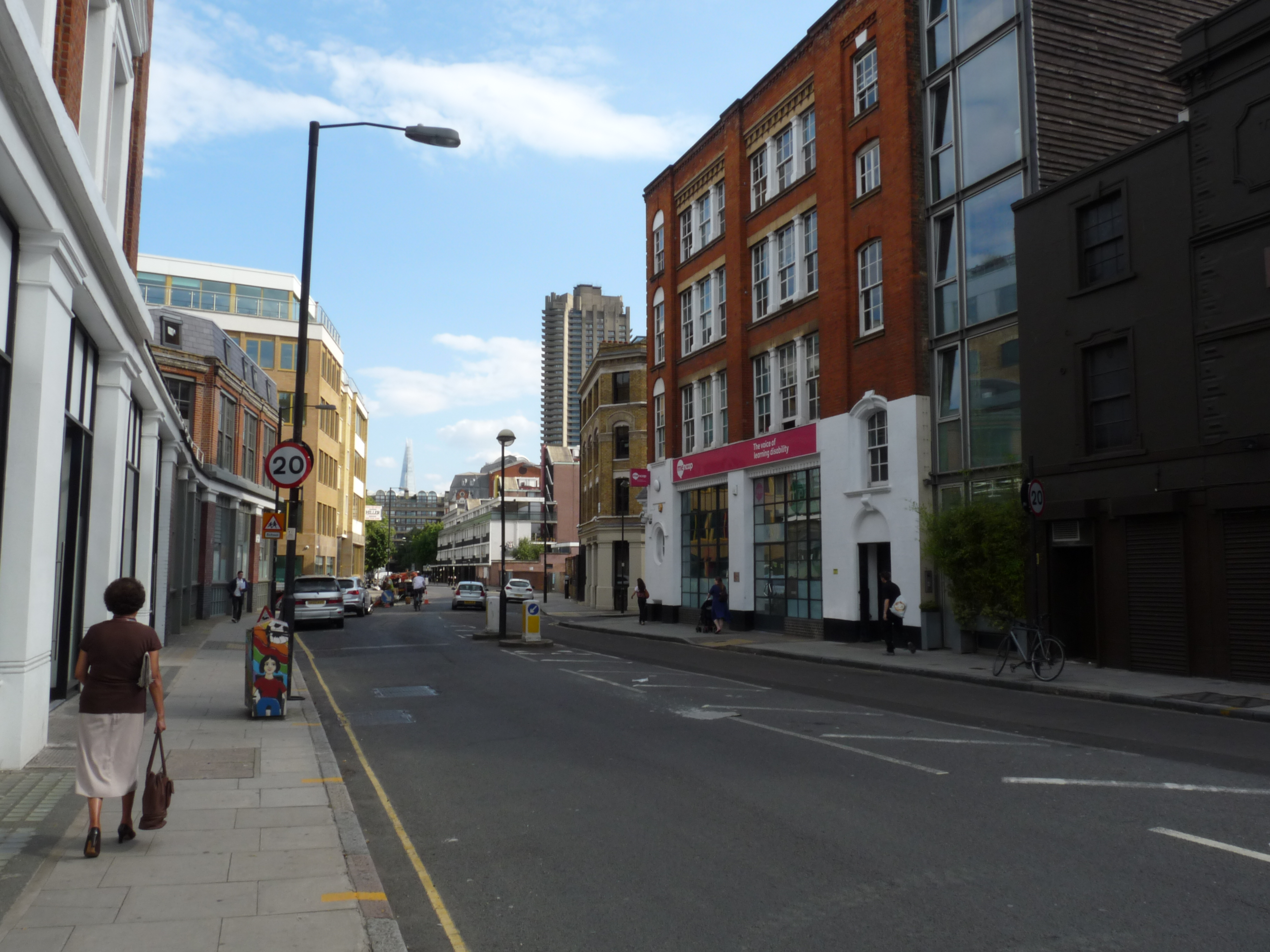
Golden Lane view south from junction with Old Street

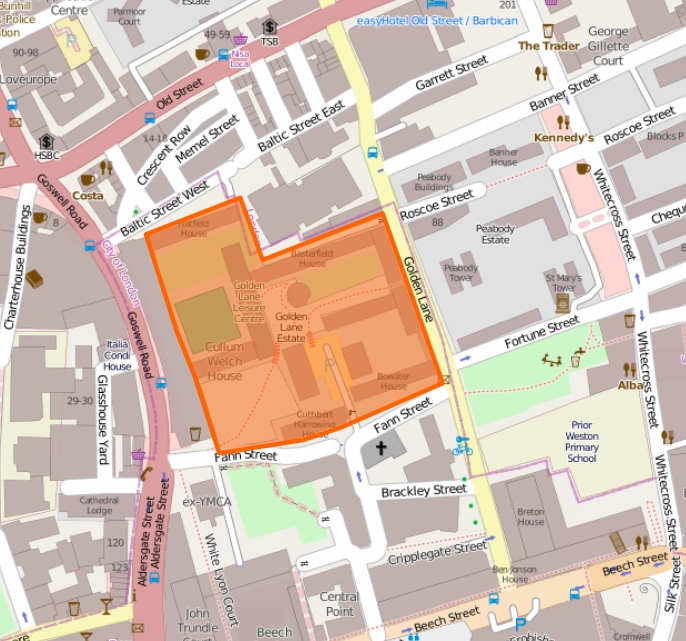
The immediate vicinity of Golden Lane with the Golden Lane Estate in orange

Golden Lane, originally known as Goldeslane or Goldyng Lane, then Golding Lane, is a street in the City of London, England, that runs north–south, between Old Street in the north, and Beech Street in the south. It dates back to at least 1274 and was the site of Edward Alleyn's Fortune Theatre that was built in 1600. The street was almost completely destroyed by bombing during the Second World War before being rebuilt in the post-war era.

== Origins ==
Gillian Bebbington notes that the lane dates back to at least 1274 when it was known as Goldeslane and probably connected with Richard, son of Golda, who is recorded as owning land in the area in 1245. The London Encyclopaedia agrees that the lane was probably named after a family who had property there and gives its original name as Golding Lane while Al Smith gives the name of the family as Goldyng and the original street name as Goldyng Lane.

John Stow's 1597 Survey of London states that 'Golding' Lane 'on both the sides is replenished with many tenements of poor people'.

== 17th century ==
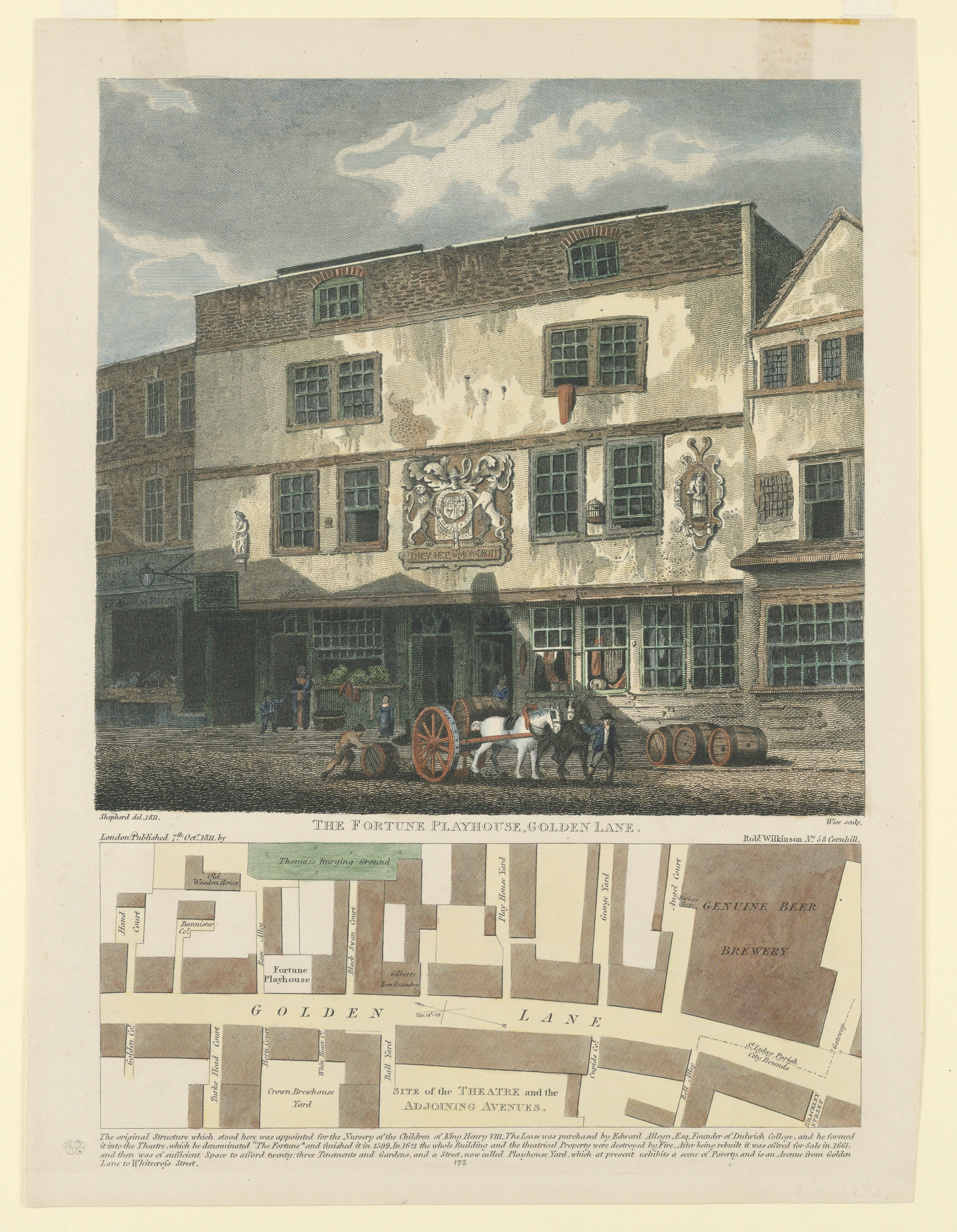
This picture was printed in Robert Wilkinson's London Illustrata in 1811, supposedly depicting the Fortune Theatre still standing, an identification repeated by many others in the 19th century. But this was 150 years after the Fortune was 'fully demolished' per Dulwich College records. Robert Nares observed in 1822 that it didn't look anything like a theatre. W.J. Lawrence identified it in 1919 as a Restoration Nursery with a House of Stuart coat of arms on its front that by 1811 had been modified to be part of the Golden Lane Brewery.

The Fortune Theatre was built on the eastern side of the street in 1600 for the actor Edward Alleyn. The theatre was highly successful and Alleyn used the money from it to found Alleyn's College in Dulwich but the wooden building was destroyed by fire in 1621. Its stone replacement was damaged by Puritan soldiers in 1649 and the building was finally demolished in 1661. In 1664 or 1678, the theatre manager and dramatist Thomas Killigrew founded an establishment for young actors known as The Nursery whose performances were attended by Samuel Pepys.

=== Conversion of the playhouse site ===
In 1656 a report from Edward Jerman and John Tanner to Dulwich College recorded that the lead had been removed from the building and that it was in a general state of disrepair and in danger of collapse, and recommended that it be replaced with 23 tenements and a street cut through from Whitecross Street to Golden Lane. The college sought to lease it to a tenant in 1659, but with no applicants decided in 1660 to sell it. After it was fully demolished in 1661, the materials were sold to William Beaven, who was also granted an effective 45-year lease to the ground, in two tranches of 21 years and a further tranche of 3 years because a college ordinance prohibited any leases longer than 21 years.

The cross street on the theatre site was named Playhouse Yard until the 20th century.

== 19th century ==
The foundation stone of the former Cripplegate Institute (now offices) on the west side was laid by the Duke of York (later King George V) in 1894. It operated as a library and a theatre and taught students of drama, opera, and secretarial subjects. It is listed grade II by Historic England.

The earliest gaslight street lighting in London was of Golden Lane, the Barbican, and the Golden Lane Brewery in 1807 by the National Light and Heat Company.

=== Genuine Beer Brewery ===
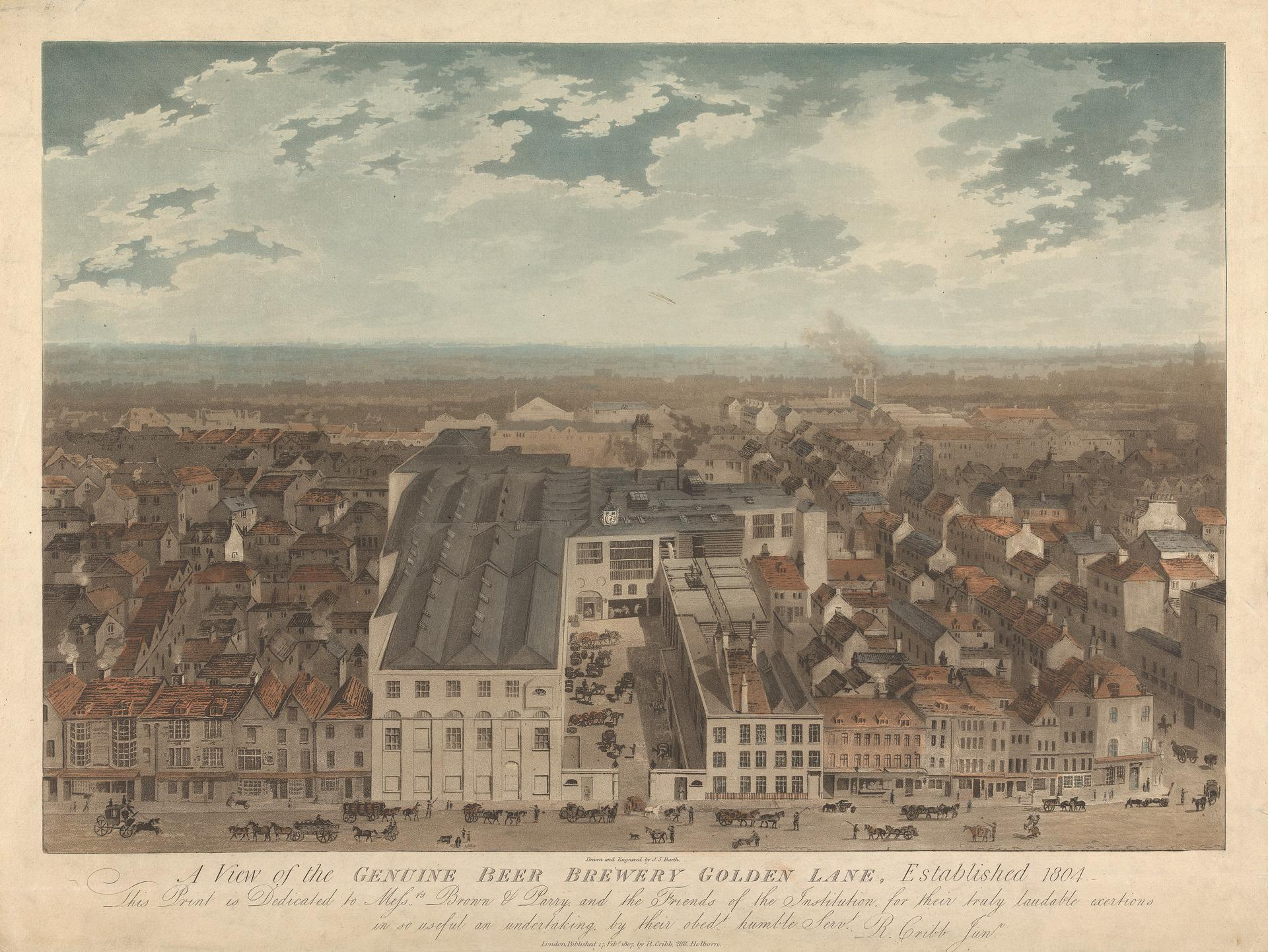
J. S. Barth's 1807 A View of the Genuine Beer Brewery, Golden Lane (original held at the British Museum)

Starting out owned by Gideon Combrune, with a purchase of a 4 horsepower (3,000 W) steam engine in May 1792, the Combrune's Brewhouse on Golden Lane was producing 18,000 barrels of ale by 1800. William Brown and Joseph Parry bought the brewery in 1804 and renamed it the Genuine Beer Brewery, with a publicity campaign promising discount pricing on porter and with the pun motto Pro Bono Publico. Their intent was to be disruptive using economies of scale and to break the monopolistic cartel of the London porter brewers of the time which had increased the wholesale price of porter to 55/- (£2.75) per barrel in two price rises over 1803 and 1804. The brewery was enlarged and refurbished, with a 36 horsepower (27,000 W) steam engine from Boulton & Watt and a porter brewing vat that held 7,000 imperial barrels (1,100,000 L).

The product was marketed as being unadulterated malt and hops, in comparison to the widespread adulteration of the time, and initial sales from October 1805 to January 1806 were good, with 14,200 barrels sold during the period and a total sale of 57,400 barrels over the first full year (1806) of trading. Yearly sales volume rose to 125,700 barrels in 1807, and 131,600 barrels in 1808, putting the brewery third in London by total sales volume in 1808 behind Meux Reid and Thrale Barclay Perkins.

The company ran into excise problems in 1807, when HM Excise decided that since retailers were selling the beer in units smaller than 0.5 firkins (20 L) the company would not qualify for the statutory duty-free "wastage" allowance of 3 barrels in every 36. A court case ensued, which hinged on the way that the company had been initially financed with partnership "shares" being sold to some 600 London publicans to raise £250,000 (equivalent to £19,398,477 in 2025) Arguing that the publicans were (what would now be called) "silent" or "sleeping" partners, with Brown and Parry the "managing" partners, the Brewery prevailed and saved an estimated £6,000 per year in excise duty.

Another legal problem ensued with the charge this time being that the brewery was adulterating its beer, with isinglass, and again the company prevailed in court. In fact, the brewery had arranged for nearby yeast dealer James Butcher to buy up discarded fish skins from fishmongers and dissolve them in stale beer, in search of an alternative to islinglass. The casks which had been seized from the brewery premises were on public display (and smell) at the yard of the Excise Office and Brown was characterized in Satirist as a businessman with a wide variety of shady schemes afoot. Although, as in the previous case, the company partners suspected the hands of its competitors in the prosecution, in fact the competitors, who had been adulterating their products, shared a common interest with the Golden Lane company in not letting a prosecution for fining succeed.

A witness for the defence at the trial was engineer William Murdoch, who claimed to have devised this fish-skin process and who had sold it as a trade secret to a consortium of London brewers, and who testified that it was 'exactly the same thing' as isinglass. The defence argument, supported by the testimony of Humphry Davy, despite his never done any experiments with the fish-skin process himself or being able to answer any questions about the brewery specifically, was that the fish-skin, like isinglass, was not an additive, because it sunk to the bottom of the vat and precipitated out, and that it should be treated by the government the same as isinglass was. Judge Archibald Macdonald found for the defence that it was unreasonable to object to innovations in brewery practices that were thanks to advances in the science of chemistry, a decision that would be later reflected in an 1817 change to the law on finings.

Rising prices of malt from 77/- (£3.85) per quarter in 1807 to over 100/- (£5.00) per quarter by 1813 drove up the brewery's wholesale prices, and in combination with the fact that the brewery was unable to raise capital from individual wealthy investors or (unlike its competitors) gain business from publicans by issuing loans to incoming leaseholders, the business fell into a decline. In 1827, the brewery was selling a mere 16,100 barrels per year, down from 45,500 per annum in 1813, and the plant was sold at public auction and the Golden Lane brewery buildings demolished.

=== City Bunhill burial ground ===
The site of the Golden Lane brewery became the City Bunhill burial ground, a Nonconformist burial ground used from October 1833 to 1853-08-14 where 18,036 people were buried according to contemporary burial registers. It was still recorded on Ordnance Survey maps of the area in 1873.

It was partly excavated in 2006, which exhumed 248 burials from the Lower section of the site, the cheapest of the three sections (alongside Middle and Upper) into which the burial ground had been divided. In 1840, for example, a 5 foot (1.5 m) grave was £1 (equivalent to £88.08 in 2025) in the Upper section, 16/- (£0.80) in the Middle section, and 12/- (£0.60) in the Lower section.

=== Golden Lane Mission ===
The whole lane was considered an excessively populous district in itself, stretching from the Barbican to Old Street, with many small passages in between, was "squalid and dirty" and was "one of the least inviting places to be found in immediate proximity of the City". It housed a large number of costers, likely due to it being central, having cheap accommodation, and being a good place to trade. The Lane was discovered by William James Orsman, who after serving in Crimea and seeing Florence Nightingale's work, founded the Golden Lane Mission to the street traders of London. It was at the time "a favourite haunt of street-traders, including costers and a number of nondescripts not to be classified", and was described as rife with "sin, squalor, and suffering".

=== Slum improvement failure ===
Golden Lane by the middle of the 19th century had become a slum, with a large population of poor Irish people, characterized by a police sergeant as a 'bad, ruffianly, thievish place' in the 1860s and by James Greenwood as the 'slummiest of slums' in his book In Strange Company in 1874.

Improvement of Golden Lane was approved by Act of Parliament, the "Golden Lane Improvement Act", formally the City of London (Golden Lane and Petticoat Square, &c.) Improvement Provisional Order Confirmation Act 1877 (40 & 41 Vict. c). However, the scheme fell victim to a corruption scandal in the Metropolitan Board of Works centring around Board member Joseph Storey.

The Board had promised £40,000 (equivalent to £4,031,684 in 2025) towards the scheme, and Storey and others had speculatively sought to acquire property that the Board intended to purchase. The parish of St Luke's, whose improvements committee Storey chaired, had reacquired property at a £4,000 (equivalent to £403,168 in 2025) profit to its purchasor. The Board was unable to convince Storey to resign, so the Board withdrew its promised contribution, leaving Story and the others unable to pay for the property that they had agreed to buy.

== 20th and 21st centuries ==
The printer and publisher C. W. Faulkner & Co. operated from number 79.

The street was almost completely destroyed by German bombing in 1940 during the London Blitz. In the 1950s the only remaining buildings in the immediate area were the Cripplegate Institute and the remains of the nearby church of St Giles-without-Cripplegate. The street and area were rebuilt in the post-war decades with the Golden Lane Estate of council housing being constructed in the 1950s on land cleared of bomb damage on the west side of the street.

The offices of Church Times, an independent Anglican weekly newspaper, are at Invicta House, 108-114 Golden Lane.

By 1911 Playhouse Yard was, in the words of Walter Besant "a quiet business-like street". The church of St Mary had been built there in 1864. After the Blitz, one end of Fortune Street (marked "Formerly Playhouse Yard" on the street signage) was comparatively undamaged, but the at the other end only a World War One memorial remained standing.

The Cordwainers College campus, part of the London College of Fashion, is in Golden Lane.

The Golden Lane Campus building, between Golden Lane and Whitecross Street, was built on the site of the City Bunhill burial ground, next to the Fortune Gardens. Completed in 2008, the Campus comprises Prior Weston Primary School on the first floor, and Prior Weston Children's Centre and the Richard Cloudesley special education needs school on the ground floor.
