= Avram Zeleznikow =

Australian community leader, restaurant owner, and teacher

Avram Zeleznikow OAM (1924 – 2013), also known as Abram Zeleznikow and Abraham Zeleznikow) was a prominent Australian community leader, restaurant owner, and teacher. Born in Vilna, Poland, Zeleznikow escaped the Vilna ghetto and fought with the partisans. After World War II, he migrated to Australia where he and his wife operated a popular Melbourne restaurant. He taught Yiddish and served on the board of numerous community organisations.

== Biography ==
Avram Zeleznikow was born in Vilna, Poland (current day Vilnius, Lithuania) on 25 May 1924. His father was a trade unionist and his mother was a midwife.

When the Germans invaded Vilna in 1941, Avram was sent to the Vilna ghetto. He escaped in 1943 when the ghetto was liquidated and joined the partisans until Vilna was liberated in 1944.

He moved to Lodz where he attended University of Lodz. There, he met his wife Masha Frydman. When the Communists come to power in Poland in 1948, the couple moved to Paris. In 1951, they emigrated to Australia and settled in Melbourne. In 1958, they opened Cafe Scheherazade in Acland Street, St Kilda. Arnold Zable wrote a book, about the pair and the cafe, called "Cafe Scheherazade", which was later turned into a play by Therese Radic that was performed at Melbourne's fortyfivedownstairs theatre and gallery. The part of Avram was played by Jim Daly.

Zeleznikow was passionate about keeping Yiddish alive and taught Yiddish on Sundays at a local school.

He served on the board of numerous organisations, including the board of the Kadimah Jewish Cultural Centre in Melbourne, the Board of Governors at Mt Scopus College, and the Victorian Jewish Board of Deputies. He was president of the Australian Jewish Welfare and Relief Society from 1990-1992 and chairman from 1993-1996. He was also the chairman of the Jewish Community Council.

In 2003, Zeleznikow and his wife were awarded Medals of the Order of Australia in the Queen's 2003 Birthday Honours.

Zeleznikow died on 8 June 2013. He was 89.

== Bibliography ==
- Zable, Arnold. “The Babel of New Beginnings.” The Age (Melbourne), October 25, 2008, sec. A2, 12.
