= Dean Jaensch =

Australian political scientist (1936–2022)

- Born: Dean Harold Jaensch; 27 October 1936; Kapunda, South Australia, Australia
- Died: 17 January 2022 (aged 85); Adelaide, South Australia, Australia
- Education: University of Adelaide
- Occupation: political scientist
- Employer: Flinders University
- Spouse: Helen
- Children: 3
- Awards: Officer of the Order of Australia (2003)

Dean Harold Jaensch AO (27 October 1936 – 17 January 2022) was an Australian political scientist and a Professor of Political and International Studies at The Flinders University of South Australia. Jaensch was awarded a Bachelor of Arts (Honours), a Master of Arts and PhD from the University of Adelaide. He wrote many highly regarded books (14) on political parties, electoral politics and voting behaviour in Australian politics, and also focussed on South Australian and Northern Territory politics, federalism within the Anglosphere and empirical methodology.

He lectured at Flinders University from the early 1970s until retirement in 2001. He was an adjunct Professor with the Department of Politics and Public Policy. For decades he was a prominent political commentator/psephologist for the Australian Broadcasting Corporation and a frequent contributor to local radio in South Australia. Jaensch was also a columnist for The Advertiser newspaper and an occasional lecturer at Flinders University. He spoke on public affairs and the machinations of State and national government. Jaensch advocated for proportional representation and an end to compulsory voting in Australia (though not necessarily compulsory enrolment).

Jaensch was created an officer of the Order of Australia in the 2003 Queen's Birthday Honours list for service to education and politics.

Jaensch was married to Helen, and had three children. He died on 17 January 2022, at the age of 85.

== Selected bibliography ==
- A Plague On Both Your Houses: Minor Parties in Australia, Allen & Unwin, Sydney, 1998 (with David Mathieson).
- Power Politics: Australia's Party System, 3rd ed., Allen & Unwin, Sydney, 1994.
- The Liberals, Allen & Unwin, Sydney, 1994.
- The Politics of Australia, Macmillan, Melbourne, 1992.
