= George Faulkner (cricketer) =

English cricketer

- Occupation: cricketer

George Faulkner was an English cricketer who played for Sussex.

Faulkner was christened at Lyminster, Sussex on 29 May 1793.

He made a single first-class appearance for the team, during the 1829 season, against England. Faulkner scored 1 not out in the first innings, and 9 in the second innings.
