= Charles H. Faulkner =

American archaeologist and anthropologist (1937–2022)

Charles H. Faulkner (16 October 1937 – 11 July 2022) was an American archaeologist and anthropologist, most recently a distinguished professor at University of Tennessee. Faulkner made his name in historical archaeology, leading digs in Tennessee and in the south-eastern United States. He also contributed to rock-art research and Woodland-period archaeology.

== Early life and professional career ==
Charles ("Charlie") Faulkner was born in Culver, Indiana. It is reported that finding a projective point when he was ten is what set him on his way to become a professional archaeologist.

He earned He worked his way through school, receiving his Bachelor's, Master's and Ph.D. degrees in Anthropology all from Indiana University Bloomington. In 1965, he was hired by the University of Tennessee to teach in the Anthropology Department. Significant sites that he worked on include Ramsey House, Blount Mansion and Cavett's Station. "He was nationally recognized for his work at Mud Glyph Cave."

Faulkner died on 11 July 2022, at the age of 84.

== Honors ==
- University of Tennessee Distinguished Professor of Humanities Award
- "Dr. Charles Faulkner Day" (2019) in Knoxville
