= David Faulkner (civil servant) =

British civil servant (1934–2020)

- Born: David Ewart Riley Faulkner; 23 October 1934
- Died: 2 November 2020 (aged 86)
- Education: Manchester Grammar School; Merchant Taylors' School, Northwood; St John's College, Oxford
- Known for: Senior Research Fellow at Oxford University / Home Office career
- Spouse: Shelia Jean Stevenson m. 1961
- Parent(s): Harold Ewart and Mabel Faulkner

David Ewart Riley Faulkner CB (23 October 1934 – 2 November 2020) was a senior research fellow at the University of Oxford Centre for Criminological Research and worked for over 30 years at the Home Office.

== Early life and education ==
Faulkner was born on 23 October 1934. He was educated at Manchester Grammar School and Merchant Taylors' School, Northwood, both all-boys private schools. He studied Literae Humaniores (classics) at St John's College, Oxford, graduating with an Oxford MA.

== Home Office career ==
David Faulkner spent a large part of his career in the Home Office, which he joined in 1959. He had responsibility at various times for prisons, House of Lords reform, Northern Ireland, police and the internal administration of the department. He was private secretary to James Callaghan as Home Secretary in 1968-1970 and was seconded to the Cabinet Office from 1978 to 1980 where he had responsibility for home affairs and the government's legislative programme. He became director of operational policy in the Prison Department in 1980 and Deputy Secretary in charge of the Criminal and Research and Statistics Department in 1982.

In the years which followed, he was responsible for work on modernising the criminal justice system and for coordinating the government's response to crime, including the treatment of minorities and victims, legislation on sentencing, and the means of preventing and reducing crime. He has been a member of the United Nations Committee on Crime Prevention and Control and led the United Kingdom delegations to the United Nations Congress on Crime and Criminal Justice in 1986 and 1990. He was appointed Order of the Bath CB in 1985.

== Subsequent Posts ==
From 1992, he was an associate at the University of Oxford Centre for Criminology and he was a fellow of St John's College, Oxford from 1992 – 1999. He wrote and lectured on various aspects of criminal justice and public service reform, with a particular interest in subjects such as accountability, responsibility, the rights and duties of citizenship and the relationships between law, politics and administration. He was a trustee of several charities concerned with law reform, the treatment of offenders, the prevention of crime and opportunities for young people.

His brother is Lord Faulkner of Worcester, a Labour member of the House of Lords.

He died in 2020.

== Books and publications ==
- Faukner, D. (2006). Crime, State and Citizen: A Field Full of Folk Waterside Press, 2nd edition.
- Faulkner, D. and Burnett, R. (2012). Where Next for Criminal Justice? The Policy Press.
- Faulkner, D. (2014). Servant of the Crown: A civil servant's story of criminal justice and public service reform Waterside Press.

Numerous articles in journals and chapters in books.
