= Richard Faulkner, Baron Faulkner of Worcester =

British Baron (born 1946)

The Right Honourable The Lord Faulkner of Worcester
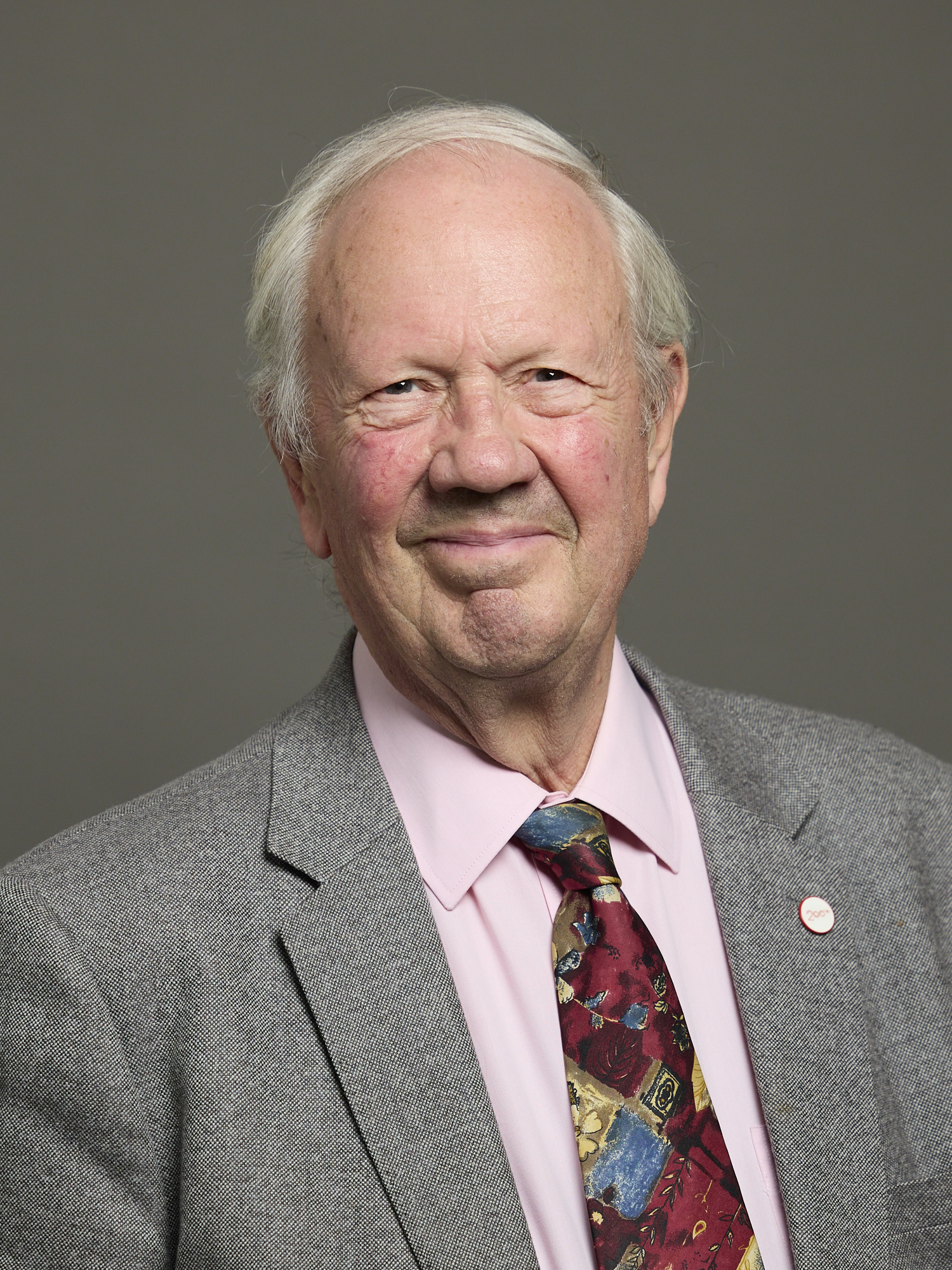
- Official portrait, 2025

Member of the House of Lords
- Lord Temporal
- Life peerage 14 July 1999

Personal details
- Born: Richard Oliver Faulkner; 22 March 1946 (age 80) Manchester, England
- Party: Labour
- Spouse: Susan Heyes (m. 1968)
- Parent(s): Harold Ewart and Mabel Faulkner
- Relatives: David Faulkner (brother)
- Education: Merchant Taylors' School, Northwood
- Alma mater: Worcester College, Oxford
- Occupation: Politician

Richard Oliver Faulkner, Baron Faulkner of Worcester (born 22 March 1946) is a Labour Party politician and life peer.

== Biography ==
Faulkner was born on 22 March 1946 in Manchester, England. He was educated at the Merchant Taylors' School, Northwood, an all-boys private school. He studied philosophy, politics and economics (PPE) at Worcester College, Oxford. He worked as a researcher and journalist for the Labour Party since when he has been active in politics. He served as a councillor in the London borough of Merton from 1971 to 1974. He was an unpaid communications advisor to the Leader of the Labour Party in the 1987, 1992 and 1997 general elections.

He contested Devizes for the Labour Party in the 1970 election and then again in February 1974 election. He contested Monmouth for the Labour Party in the October 1974 election and Huddersfield West for the Labour Party in the 1979 election.

He was raised to the peerage in 1999, as Baron Faulkner of Worcester, of Wimbledon in the London Borough of Merton. He has served on a number of parliamentary committees, and lists his political interests as transport, sport, human rights, smoking and health, and sex equality. He is Vice Chair of the All-Party Parliamentary Group on Industrial Heritage. He is the UK trade envoy to Taiwan. Lord Faulkner chairs the Alderney Gambling Control Commission.

Lord Faulkner is married to Susan (née Heyes), with whom he has two daughters. His brother was the civil servant David Faulkner.

== Books and publications ==
- Faulkner, R. and Austin, C. (2012). Holding the Line: How Britain's Railways Were Saved. Oxford Publishing Company
- Faulkner, R. and Austin, C. (2015). Disconnected! Broken Links in Britain's Rail Policy. Oxford Publishing Company
- Faulkner, R. and Austin, C. (2023). Signals Passed at Danger: Railway Power and Politics in Britain. Crecy Publishing Ltd.

== Arms ==
Coat of arms of Richard Faulkner, Baron Faulkner of Worcester

Crest
A falcon Or holding in the beak a pear Gules slipped and leaved Vert and resting the dexter foreclaws upon a wheel Gules.
Escutcheon
Or three chevronels interlaced each per chevron Vert and Gules and each ensigned by a martlet also Gules.
Supporters
On either side a bear statant erect Or that on the dexter holding in the mouth a rose Gules seeded Or barbed slipped and leaved Vert and that in the sinister holding in the mouth a fleur-de-lis Gules.
Motto
Bear And Forbear
Badge
A bear sejant erect and supporting between the forepaws a portcullis chained Or.

Orders of precedence in the United Kingdom
Preceded by The Lord Forsyth of Drumlean	Gentlemen; Baron Faulkner of Worcester	Followed by The Lord Rogan
