= David Faulkner (judoka) =

American judoka

David Faulkner is a former two-time U.S. national champion in judo. He is also a two-time silver and bronze medalist in the national championships in Judo. He was an alternate member of the US team for the 1992 Summer Olympics.
