= C. W. Faulkner =

Printer and publisher

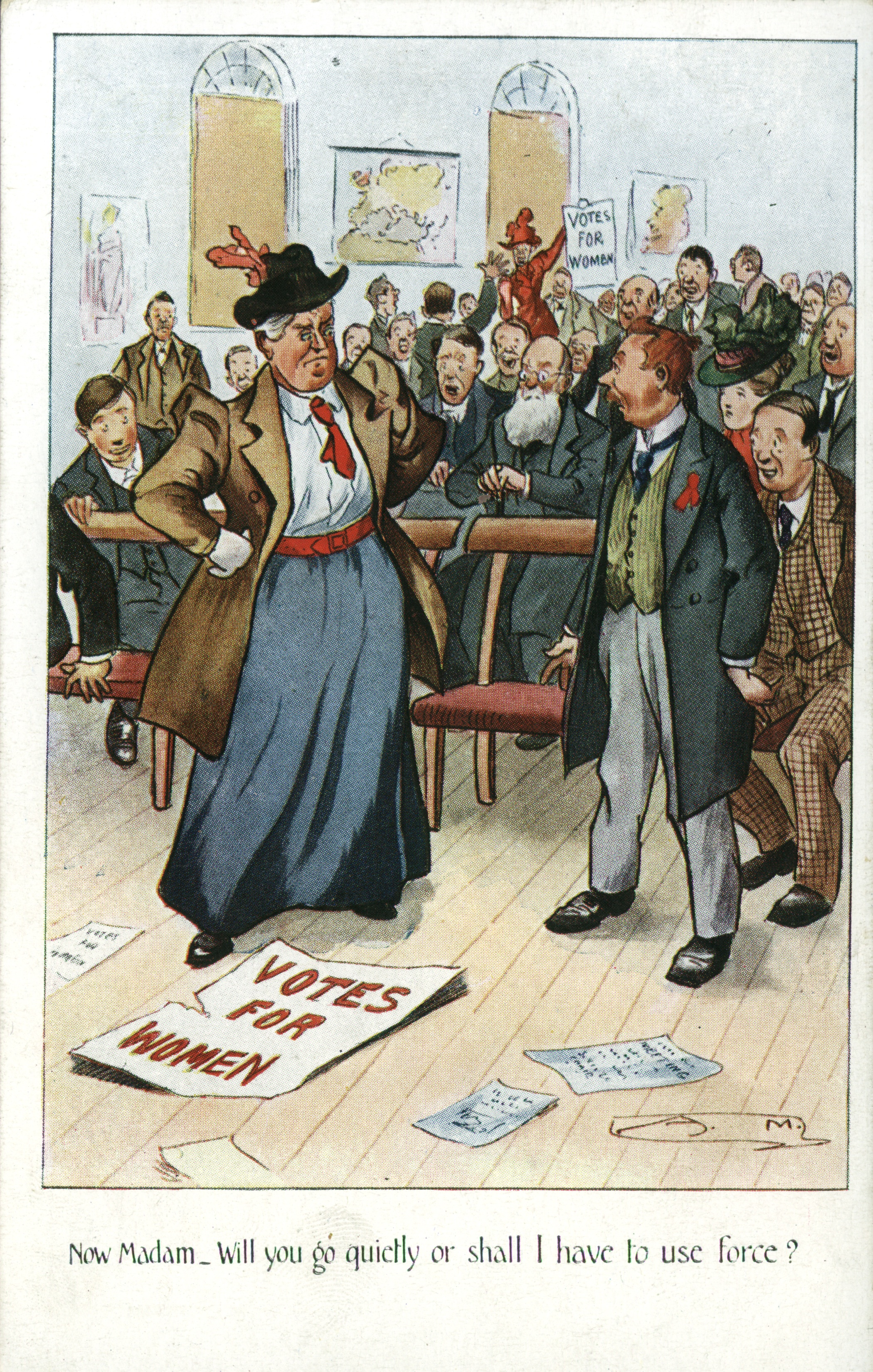
One of a series of postcards on the theme of women's suffrage

Charles William Faulkner was a printer and publisher who initially produced Christmas cards with a partner. He then became sole proprietor of the business which was incorporated as the limited company, C. W. Faulkner & Co., in 1905. The business expanded to produce a variety of printed products including calendars, diaries, games, playing cards and postcards. It was based at number 79, Golden Lane, London while much of the high-quality printing was done in Germany.

The illustrations were produced by artists including John Bacon, Albert Ernest Kennedy, George Washington Lambert and Ethel Parkinson. The games included variations of traditional games like Happy Families, Snap, Tiddlywinks and the egg-and-spoon race. One popular line was Misfitz – a trick-taking game involving assembly of characters cut into three segments – which was produced with a variety of themes including Alice in Wonderland.

Faulkner died on 18 November 1915. His will divided the shares of his company for seven different men on the grounds that they continued to work at the firm for at least two years after his death. The company continued to run until at least the 1930s.
