= Neil Faulkner (painter) =

British realist painter

Neil Faulkner (born 1952) is a British realist painter. He lives and works in the United Kingdom, and exhibits his paintings at many galleries throughout the UK and Ireland.
The majority of Faulkner's paintings are watercolours, although he also produces oil paintings. His watercolours fall into the categories of figurative and still life. He is best known for his rustic still life paintings.

Typical subjects of Neil’s paintings are flowers, fruit, furniture, pottery, crockery and diverse everyday objects. The exploration of light and shade is central to Faulkner’s art. In his paintings light flows through windows and doors and falls on objects, endowing them with vibrancy and vividness of colour.

As a young man, Faulkner got acquainted with the works of the American realist painter Andrew Wyeth at the Royal Academy of Arts in London. Since then Wyeth has been a constant inspiration to Faulkner, and he has travelled to the United States to see more paintings by Wyeth.

For many years Neil has worked for Royal Doulton, an English tableware company, producing designs and paintings for their porcelain. Faulkner was responsible for the artwork commemorating the 100th birthday of Queen Elizabeth The Queen Mother.
