= Disappearance of Louise and Charmian Faulkner =

1980 missing person case in Australia

Louise Faulkner
- Born: Louise Yvonne Faulkner; 7 April 1937; Colac, Victoria, Australia
- Disappeared: 26 April 1980 (aged 43); St Kilda, Victoria, Australia
- Status: Missing for 46 years, 6 months and 21 days

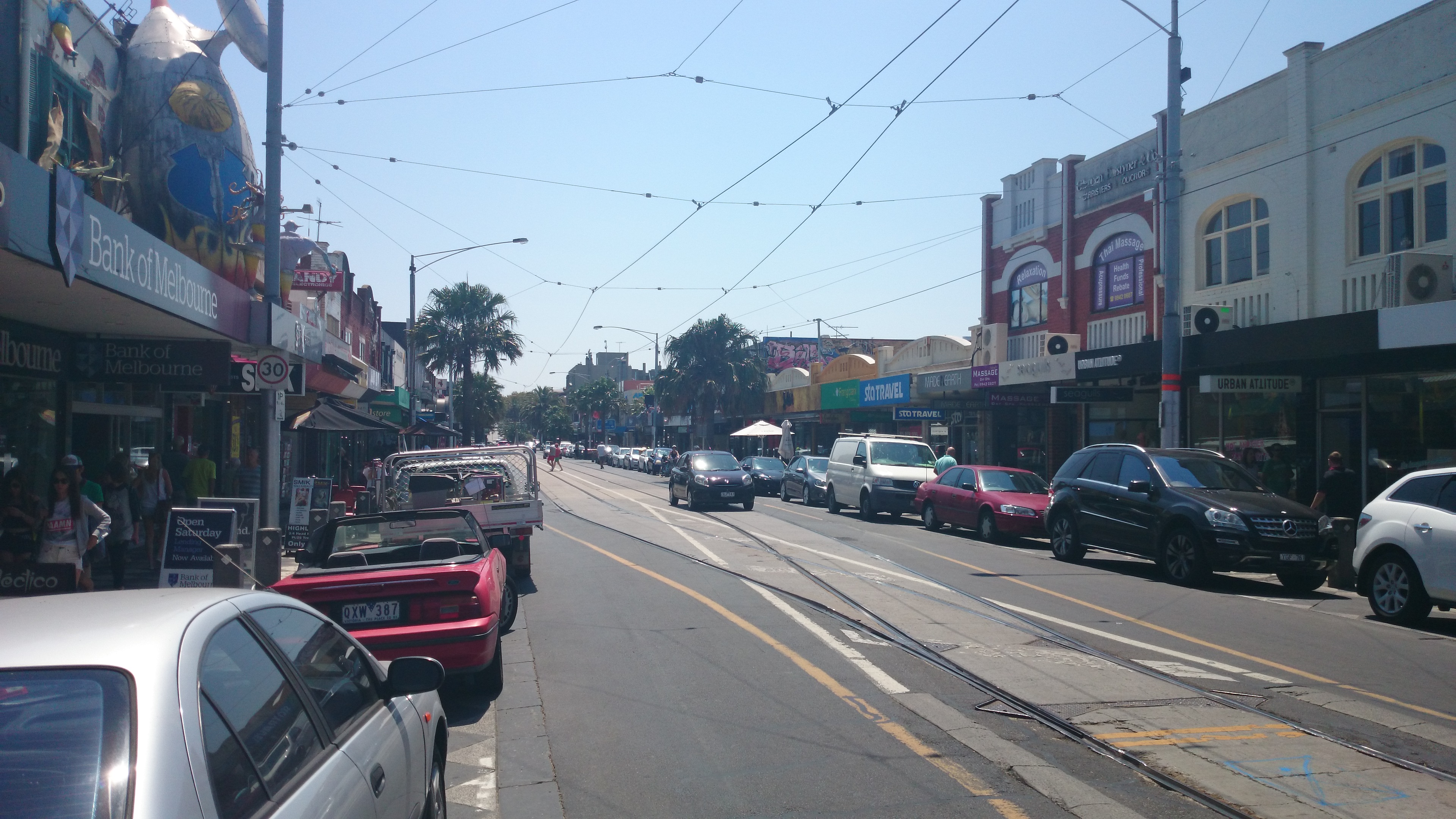
Acland Street in St Kilda

Charmian Faulkner
- Born: Charmian Christabel Alexis Faulkner; 30 October 1977
- Disappeared: 26 April 1980 (aged 2); St Kilda, Victoria, Australia
- Status: Missing for 46 years, 6 months and 21 days
- Parents: Uncertain, possibly George Sutherland (father); Louise Faulkner (mother)

Louise Yvonne Faulkner (born 7 April 1937) and Charmian Christabel Alexis Faulkner (born 30 October 1977) were a mother and daughter who went missing from St Kilda, Victoria, Australia, in 1980. As of 2025, no-one has been charged over the disappearance and no bodies have been found.

== Background ==
Louise Faulkner was born on 7 April 1937, in Colac, Victoria, and was the youngest of three children. Her daughter Charmian was born on 30 October 1977.

== Last confirmed sighting ==
Whilst residing at Acland St, St. Kilda, Louise Faulkner developed a friendship with Corrine Wylde, a neighbour in the same block of flats. On 25 April 1980, Anzac Day in Australia, Louise and Charmian attended a first birthday party for Wylde's son. Faulkner told Wylde that she was going to visit her boyfriend in Gippsland. The following day, Wylde saw the two Faulkners get into a white ute with an older man. This was the last confirmed sighting of either of them. Louise Faulkner was aged 43 and Charmian was two at the time of their disappearance. The only suspect was her lover 60 year old George Sutherland whom Louise Faulkner named as Charmian's father.

== Police investigation ==
On 9 June 1980, preliminary investigations of the disappearances began. Inquiries were conducted over the following 12 months with friends and associates of Louise.

== Coronial inquest ==
In August 2006, a coronial inquest was held into the disappearance and death of Louise and Charmian Faulkner and found that the pair were probably murdered. The inquest was re-convened in 2008. On that occasion the coroner ruled the deaths foul play, but said there was not enough evidence to link anyone to the killings.

== See also ==
- Cold case
- Crime in Melbourne
- List of people who disappeared
