= Steve Faulkner =

English footballer (born 1954)

Personal information
- Full name: Stephen Andrew Faulkner
- Date of birth: 18 December 1954 (age 71)
- Place of birth: Sheffield, England
- Position: Central defender

Youth career
- Sheffield United

Senior career*
Years	Team	Apps	(Gls)
1972–1978	Sheffield United	15	(0)
1978	→ Stockport County (loan)	4	(0)
1978–1980	York City	90	(7)
–	Frickley Athletic		
- * Club domestic league appearances and goals

Stephen Andrew Faulkner (born 18 December 1954, in Sheffield) is an English former footballer who played in the Football League as a central defender for Sheffield United, Stockport County and York City. He then moved into non-League football with Frickley Athletic.
