= Jim Macken =

Australian lawyer (1927–2019)

James Joseph Macken AM (1927–2019) was an Australian lawyer, judge and human rights activist.

== Career ==
MacKen was admitted as a barrister in July 1963, and worked in cases of employment law. on 2 June 1975 he was appointed a judge of the Industrial Commission of NSW and retired on 21 August 1989.

=== Subsequent career ===
After retiring as a judge, Macken continued to work as an academic and author, including lecturing in industrial relations at Sydney Law School.

In September 2016, Macken offered to trade places with a refugee at one of the immigration detention camps operated in Nauru or Manus under Australia's Pacific Solution policy.

== Death ==
Jim Macken died in his sleep on 19 September 2019. He is survived by his eleven children, two brothers and twenty-three grand children.

== Honours ==
In June 2003 Macken was made a Member of the Order of Australia for service to industrial relations as an advocate, judge, academic and author.

== Selected bibliography ==
- Cullen, Charles & Macken, J J (1973). An outline of industrial law, Commonwealth and New South Wales (3rd ed.). Law Book Co. ISBN 0455164606.
- Macken, J J; Moloney, Carolyn & McCarry, G J (1978). The common law of employment (1st ed.). Law Book Co. ISBN 0455195781.
- Macken, J J (1980). Commission of Inquiry into the industrial relations of the Public Transport Commission. ISBN 0724063684.
- Macken, J J (2007). Board of Inquiry Mine Safety Enforcement Policy (PDF). Independent Board of Inquiry Mine Safety Enforcement Policy. ISBN 9780734718563.
- Macken, J J (2012). What is to be done? : the struggle for the soul of the labour movement. Federation Press. ISBN 9781862878785.
