= John Alfred Faulkner =

John Alfred Faulkner (14 July 1857 – 6 September 1931) was an American church historian and Methodist minister. He was born in Grand Pré, Nova Scotia, and graduated from Acadia College where he earned three degrees, A.B. (1878). A.M. (1890), and D.D. (1902). In 1881 he earned his B.D. from Drew Theological Seminary. He also studied at Andover Theological Seminary and the University of Leipzig. He served as a minister (ordained in 1883) in the Pennsylvania Conference of the Methodist Episcopal Church. In 1897 he returned to Drew University as the Professor of Church History, a post previously held by George R. Crooks. Faulkner's earlier work, The Methodists, indicates that the title of his post was originally Professor of Historical Theology. This would be Faulkner's only academic position. Faulkner's eulogizer notes that he held an affinity for "the older theological position," and notes that some of Faulkner's writings were considered to be "controversial". Faulkner was also part of the American Society of Church History, serving as its president in 1916.

He contributed to Hurst's History of the Christian Church (1897–1900).

== Books ==
- The Methodists (1903)
- Cyprian (1906)
- Erasmus (1908)
- Crises in the Early Church (1912)
- Wesley as a Sociologist, Theologian, Churchman (1918)
- Value of Study of Church History (1920)
- Modernism and the Christian Faith (1921)
- Burning Questions in Historic Christianity (1930)
