= George Faulkner Wetherbee =

American-British painter

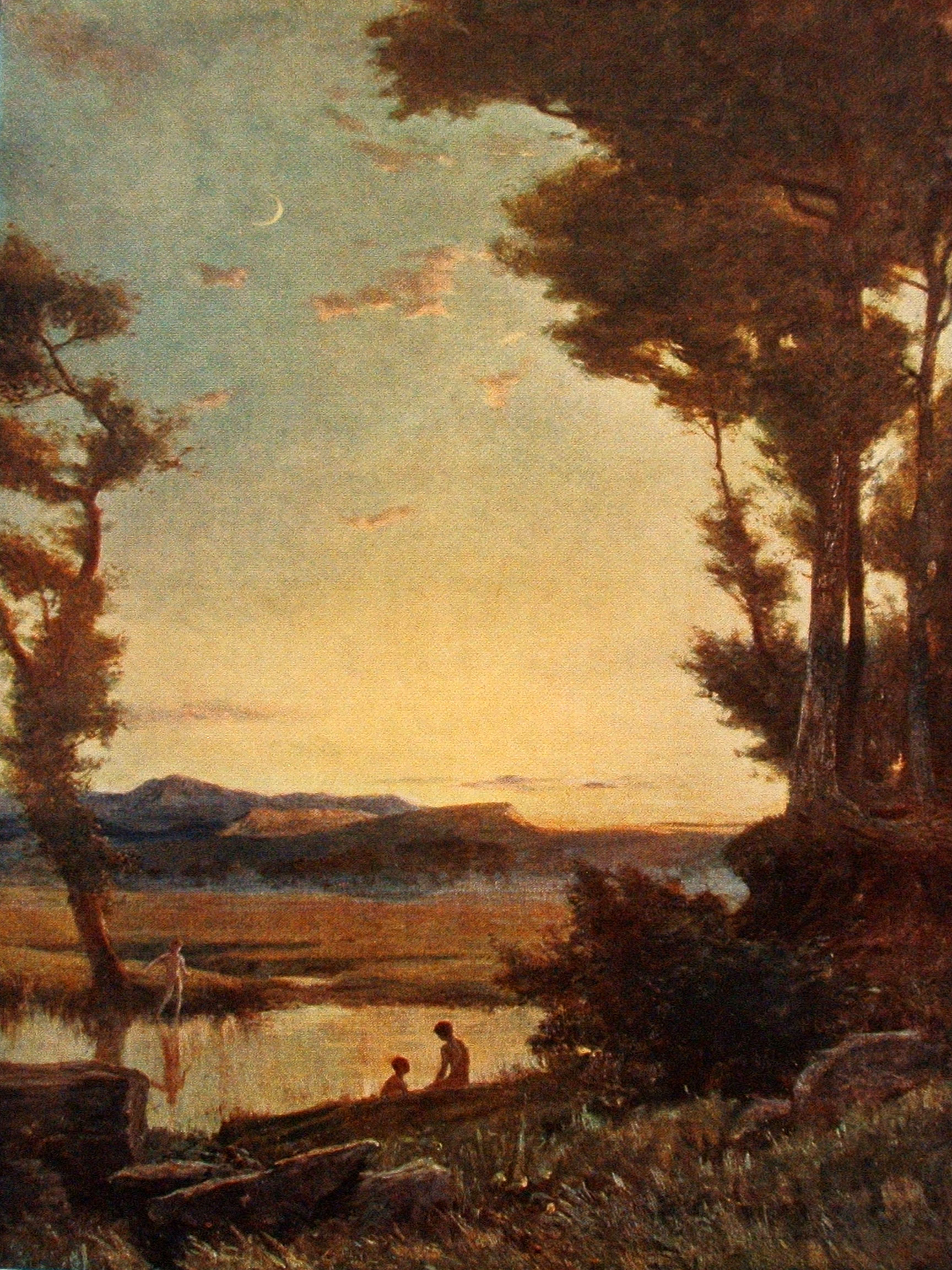
The Sylvan Stream (full version)

George Faulkner Wetherbee, R.I., R.O.I. (Cincinnati, 1851–1920) was an American painter. He lived for most of his life in England.

Born in Cincinnati, in December 1850, his early talent was evident and he was sent to Europe to study in art schools at Antwerp, then London. He then lived in various countries on the continent of Europe, and frequently visited the West Indies to paint there. He achieved success in his 40s, with recognition by the distinguished London art societies, and his mastery of colour and light were highly acclaimed. He worked in both oils and watercolor, mostly showing idyllic landscapes with small figures of young people. He also made several commercial rural scenes in the 1890s, immediately after his success.

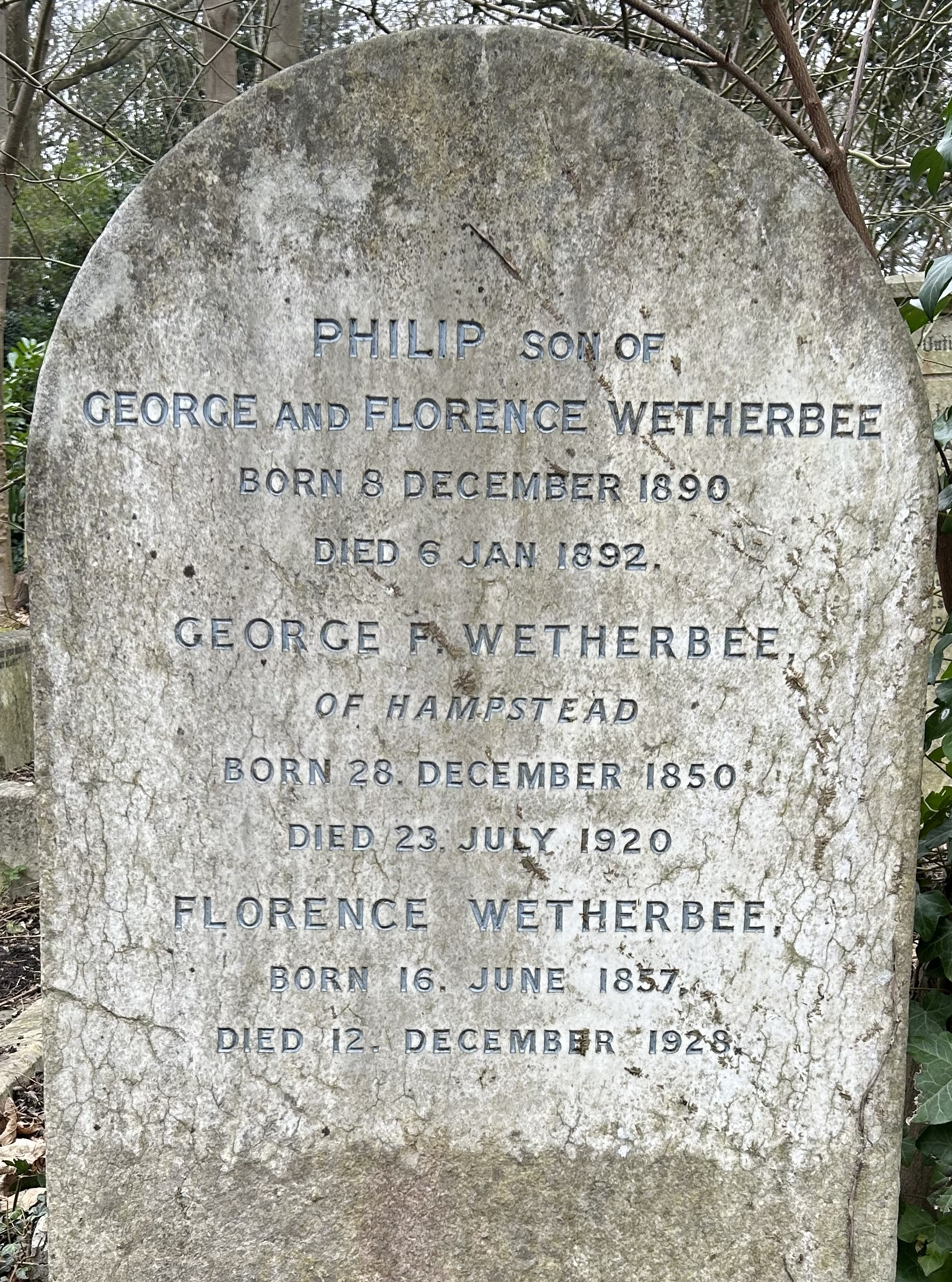
Grave of George Faulkner Wetherbee in Highgate Cemetery

From 1880 he lived in various houses in Belsize Park and Hampstead. He commissioned the architect Horace Field to design his last house, White Cottage, 18 Redington Road, which was demolished in 2013.

He died on 23rd July 1920 and was buried at Highgate Cemetery.

== Books about the artist ==
- Mona Wetherbee van der Weyd, Henry van der Weyd, David Crook (Eds) (1999). George's Letters Home. (His letters to relatives in the U.S.)
