= John Faulkner (pilot) =

Australian naval and commercial pilot

John Peter Edmund Faulkner (born 1937) is a retired naval and commercial pilot, and a Member of the Order of Australia for service to the aviation industry, particularly to air safety, and as a contributor to tertiary education programs in Australia.

== Career ==
=== Royal Navy ===
John Faulkner was born 15 November 1937 in Sale, Cheshire in the United Kingdom to Victor and Edna Faulkner. Interested in a career in the Navy, he went to Pangbourne College in 1950 and then Britannia Royal Naval College (BRNC), commonly known as Dartmouth, as a Midshipman in 1955. During his training, Faulkner had an opportunity to try gliding and this experience stimulated a lifelong passion for flying.

On promotion to Sub Lieutenant, John Faulkner first served on HMS Alamein, a Battle Class destroyer based in Malta. He commenced flying training in 1959 at RAF Linton-on-Ouse with the Royal Air Force No. 1 Flying Training School (1 FTS). 1 FTS is the oldest military pilot training school in the world and prepared Naval pilots for service in the Fleet Air Arm. At this time the school was equipped with Vampire T.11 and Provost trainers. Faulkner completed operational flying training at RAF Lossiemouth in 1960, flying Sea Hawks. After conversion to the Supermarine Scimitar, the largest, heaviest and most powerful aircraft to have entered service with the Fleet Air Arm at that point. Faulkner joined 804 squadron and completed his first aircraft carrier landing on HMS Hermes in November 1960. The Scimitar suffered from a high loss rate; 39 were lost in a number of accidents, amounting to 51% of the Scimitar's production run. Faulkner later joined 800 squadron on HMS Ark Royal in late 1961 and later saw service in Malta and Aden, flying Scimitars, Sea Devons and Sea Vixens. Faulkner resigned his Naval commission in 1967.

=== Qantas ===
Faulkner joined Qantas in 1967 and served as Second and First Officer on the Boeing 707 and 747 aircraft. He subsequently checked out as Captain on the Boeing 767. During his career with Qantas he flew Australian troops between Sydney and Saigon during the Vietnam War as part of the 'Skippy Squadron' earning the Vietnam Logistic and Support Medal, and was selected for multiple flight segments to fly the Queen and Prince Philip on their official visits to Australia.

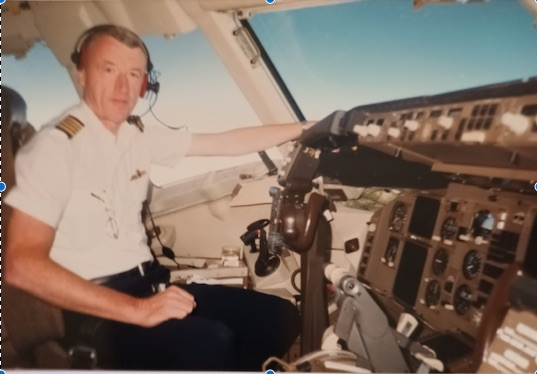
In the cockpit

With a growing interest in air safety, he was appointed Technical Safety Director for the Pilot's Union and promoted manager of Flight Safety for Qantas from 1989 – 1994. During this time he completed the Accident Investigation course at Cranfield, UK and was a member of a steering committee that successfully introduced Cockpit Resource Management to Qantas. He also managed the introduction of Fleet Performance Monitoring into the Airline and was a popular speaker at conferences such as Safeskies, and the Flight Safety Foundation. Faulkner retired as Manager Flight Safety and Deputy Head of Safety of Qantas Airways in 1994.

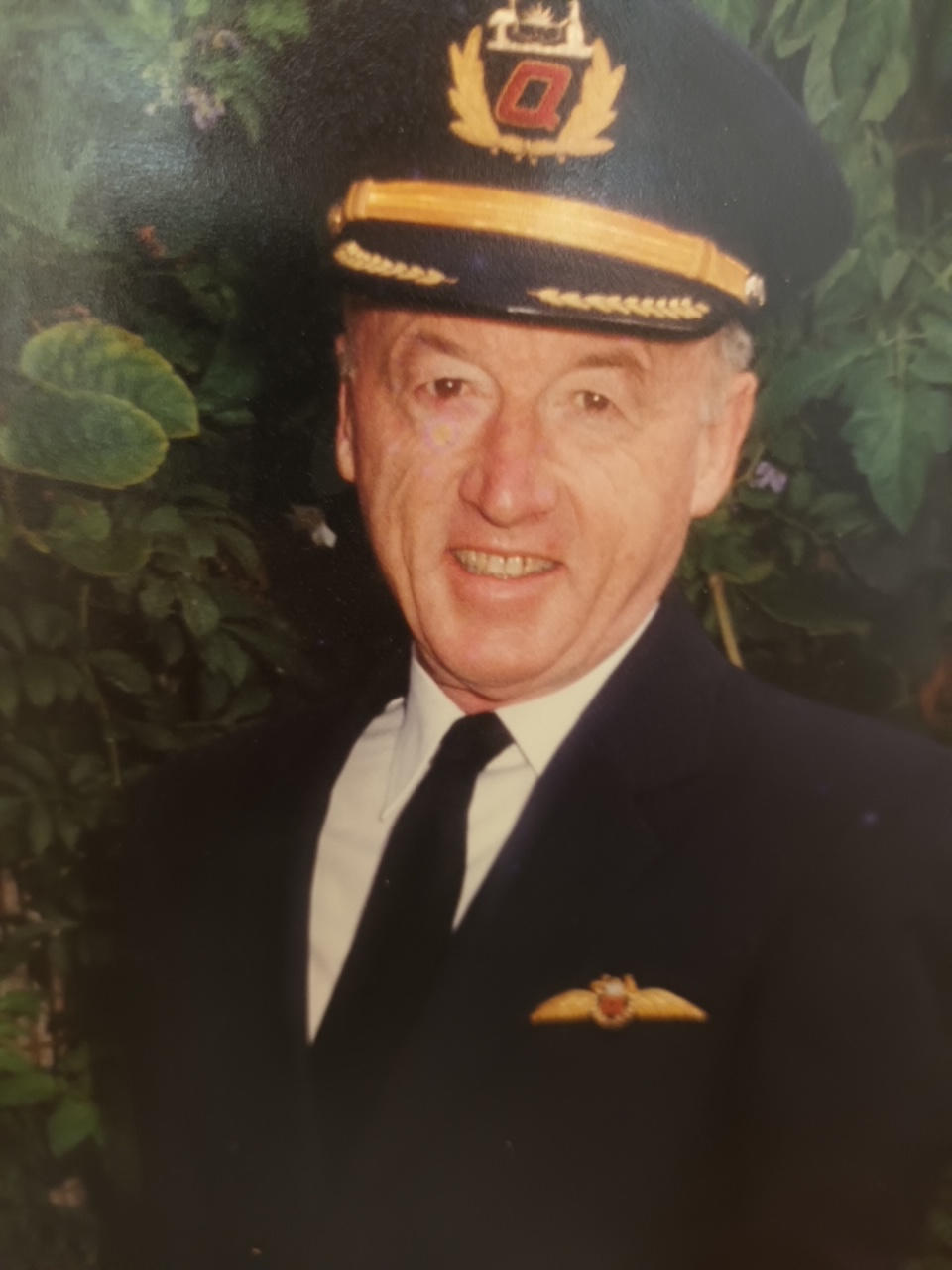

=== Aviation safety consulting and tertiary education ===
In 1995 Faulkner established the Aviation Safety Analysis consultancy. He was appointed deputy chairman of the Board of AirServices Australia at its formation in 1995. In 1998 he was a member of a committee to examine flight safety management throughout the Australian Defence Forces and was a standing civilian member for the boards of inquiry. After the maximum period of five years he left the Board of AirServices Australia in June 2000.

While still at Qantas Faulkner had contributed to the planning and then expansion of the Aviation Program at the University of New South Wales in 1993. As adjunct associate Professor at the university, he taught flight safety and aviation human factors. He was regularly called upon to provide expert opinion to the news media on topics such as black box flight data recorders

=== Honours and recognition ===
In the 2003 Queen's Birthday Honours he was made a Member of the Order of Australia for service to the aviation industry particularly to air safety and as a contributor to tertiary education programs. He is a Fellow of the Royal Aeronautical Society and Past President of its Australian Division.

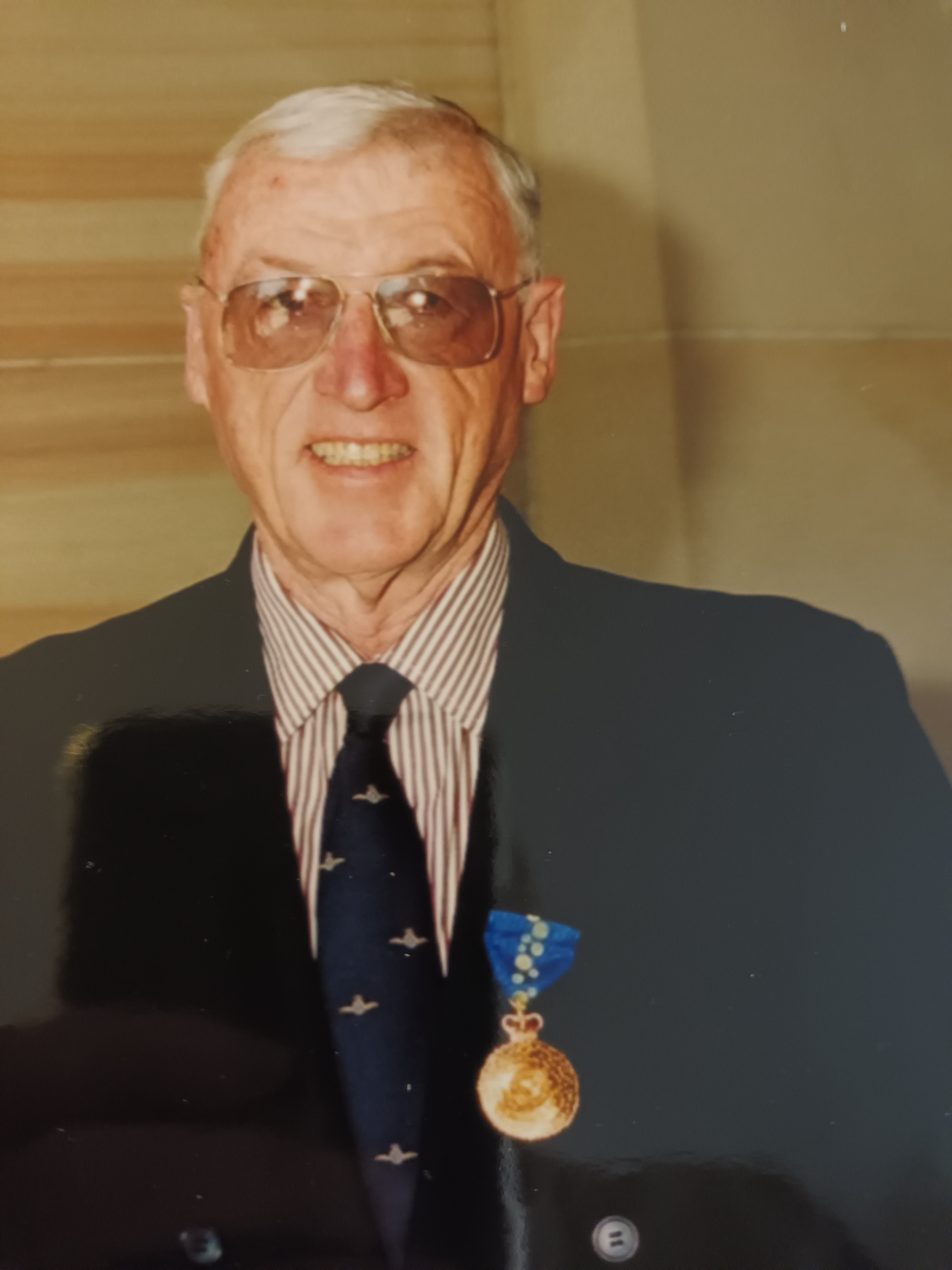
