= Charles Hugh Branston Faulkner =

Charles Hugh Branston Faulkner OBE (8 June 1916 – 6 April 1997) was the founder, and director from 1961 to 1983 of Help the Aged.

== Life ==
He was born in Lutterworth, Leicestershire, and worked from 1936 to 1946 in the educational administration of the City of Leicester and then with Church Brothers estate agents. He became the Honorary Director of Voluntary and Christian Service in 1954 and moved from there to Help the Aged. At the age of 67 he became Director of the Asthma Research Council. He boosted its income five-fold, and built up the local network to over 150 branches.

He founded the Persistent Virus Disease Research Association in 1992 to support research into myalgic encephalomyelitis (ME) with his wife, who was a sufferer. Faulkner refused to accept the initial view that ME sufferers were somehow malingerers. ME is now recognised as a legitimate medical condition.

Faulkner was appointed an Officer of the Order of the British Empire (OBE) in the 1980 Birthday Honours.
