= Falconer (surname) =

Falconer is a Scottish surname, either a sept of Clan Keith or a clan on its own, having as crest an angel in a praying posture or, within an orle of laurel proper, as motto VIVE UT VIVAS ("Live that you may have life") but without a chief, being merely an armigerous clan. It is an Anglicized version of the Old French Faulconnier, the name being derived from the occupational name for a trainer of falcons. It can also be used as a first name or as a middle name.

== People with the surname ==
- Alex Falconer, Scottish politician
- Alex Falconer, American politician from Minnesota
- Algernon Keith-Falconer, 9th Earl of Kintore (1852–1930), brother of Ion Keith Falconer, British politician and colonial governor
- Brian Falconer (1933–2020), Australian rules footballer
- Charles Falconer, Baron Falconer of Thoroton (born 1951), British lawyer and politician
- Colin Falconer (disambiguation), several people

- Colin Falconer (bishop) (1623–1686), Scottish bishop
- Colin Falconer (writer) (born 1953), English novelist

- Daniel Falconer, prop designer
- Sir David Falconer (1640–1685), Scottish judge
- Deborah Falconer (born 1965), American actress and musician
- Delia Falconer (born 1966), Australian novelist
- Doug Falconer (Canadian football) (1952–2021), Canadian professional football player
- Douglas Scott Falconer, British quantitative geneticist
- Douglas Falconer (judge) (1914–2007), British judge
- Duncan Falconer, British commando and author
- Earl Falconer (born 1959), British bass player, member of UB40
- Edmund Falconer (1814–1879), writer and actor
- Elizabeth Falconer (born 1956), American koto player
- Etta Zuber Falconer (1933–2002), American educator and mathematician
- George Falconer (footballer) (1946–2013), Scottish footballer
- Hamish Falconer (born 1985), British politician and diplomat
- Hugh Falconer (1808–1865), Scottish palaeontologist, geologist and botanist
- Ian Falconer (1959–2023), American illustrator and children's book author
- Ion Keith Falconer (1856–1887), brother of Algernon Keith-Falconer, 9th Earl of Kintore, missionary and Arabic scholar
- Jacob Falconer (1869–1928), American representative
- Jenni Falconer (born 1976), British television presenter
- John Falconer (disambiguation), multiple people

- John Falconer, character in On the Run (novel series)
- John Falconer (actor), played in The Pied Piper (1972 film)
- John Falconer (bishop) (ca. 1660–1723), Prelate of the Scottish Episcopal Church
- John Falconer (footballer) (1902–1982), Scottish footballer
- John Falconer (Jesuit) (1577–1656), English Jesuit
- John Falconer (merchant) (fl. 1547), English merchant and botanist
- John Falconer (MP), Member of Parliament for Kincardineshire
- John Falconer (poker player) (born c. 1955), British poker player
- John A. Falconer (1844–1900), soldier in the American Civil War
- John Downie Falconer (1876–1947), Scottish geologist and geographer
- John Ireland Falconer (1879–1954), Lord Provost of Edinburgh
- John Mackie Falconer (1820–1903), etcher, painter and watercolourist

- Joyce Falconer (born 1970), Scottish actress
- Kenneth Falconer (mathematician) (born 1952), British mathematician
- Kenneth Falconer, pen name of Cyril M. Kornbluth (1923–1958), American science fiction author
- Kyle Falconer (born 1987), Scottish singer
- Pablo Falconer, British reggae producer
- Peter Falconer (politician) (born 1943), Australian politician
- Reid Falconer (born 1956), American politician
- Robert Falconer (1867–1943), Canadian academic
- Thomas Falconer (disambiguation), multiple people
- William Falconer (disambiguation), multiple people

- William Falconer, 6th Lord Falconer of Halkerton (1712–1776), English aristocrat
- William Falconer (bishop) (1707–1784), Scottish clergyman
- William Falconer (poet) (1732–1769), Scottish poet
- William Falconer (translator) (1801–1885), English clergymen and academic
- William Falconer (writer) (1744–1824), English physician and Fellow of the Royal Society

- Willie Falconer (born 1966), Scottish footballer

== People with the first or middle name ==
- Angus Falconer Douglas-Hamilton (1863–1915), Scottish military officer
- David Falconer Wells (born 1939), professor of theology
- Falconer Madan (1851–1935), British librarian
- Hardy Falconer Parsons (1897–1917), British military officer
- Lyall Falconer Howard (1896–1955), Australian war veteran and businessman
- James Falconer Wilson (1828–1895), American congressman
- Keith Falconer Fletcher (1900–1987), American book dealer
- Paul Falconer Poole (1806–1879), English painter

== Fictional characters with the surname ==
- Quellcrist Falconer, a character of Richard Morgan's Takeshi Kovacs series

== See also ==
- Falconer (disambiguation)
- Falkner (disambiguation)
- Faulkner (surname)
- Faulconer (surname)
- Faulknor (disambiguation)
- Fawkner (disambiguation)
