= Falcone =

Falcone may refer to:

== People with the surname Falcone ==
- Achille Falcone (1570–1600), Italian composer
- Alê Falcone (b. 1990), Brazilian futsal player
- Alex Falcone (b. 1984), American comedian
- Aniello Falcone (1600–1665), Italian painter
- Baldomero Falcone (b. 1944), Filipino business consultant and politician
- Ben Falcone (b. 1973), American actor
- Ben Falcone (rugby league) (b. 1988), Italian rugby league player
- Don Falcone (b. 1958), American musician
- Federico Falcone (b. 1988), Argentine footballer
- Giovanni Falcone (1939–1992), Italian judge killed by the Mafia
- Giulio Falcone (b. 1974), Italian footballer
- Leonard Falcone (1899–1985), baritone horn/euphonium virtuoso
- Luigi Falcone (b. 1992), Italian footballer
- Marco Falcone (fencer) (b. 1959), Italian fencer
- Mario Falcone (b. 1988), English television personality
- Pete Falcone (b. 1953), American baseball player
- Philip Falcone, an American businessman
- Pierre Falcone (b. 1954), French businessman
- Roger Falcone, American physicist
- Sonia Falcone (b. 1965), Bolivian painter and artist
- Steven Falcone, American neurologist
- Tom Falcone, drummer of the band Cute Is What We Aim For
- Wladimiro Falcone, (b. 1995) Italian footballer

== Fictional characters ==
- Falcone crime family (the Falcones), a DC comics crime family, see Carmine Falcone
  - Alberto Falcone, a DC comics character, son of Carmine Falcone in the Batman universe
  - Carmine Falcone, a DC comics character, a fictional mob boss in the Batman universe, father of Alberto Falcone and Mario Falcone; head of the Falcone crime family in the DC Universe
  - Kitrina Falcone, a DC comics character
  - Mario Falcone (DC Comics), a DC comics character
  - Sofia Falcone Gigante, a DC comics character
- Falcone crime family (the Falcones), from the book series The Camorra Chronicles by author Cora Reilly
- Falcone crime family (the Falcones), from the 1986 action-comedy film Detective School Dropouts, of Bruno, Don, and Sonia Falcones
- Falcone crime family (the Falcones), from the video game Mafia II
  - Carlo Falcone, the don of the Falcone crime family in the video game Mafia II
- Frankie Falcone, a fictional crime boss from the novel The Godfather
- James Danger/"Jimmy" Falcone (McDougal), the main protagonist from the Canadian adult animated sitcom Fugget About It
- Mateo Falcone, the protagonist of a short story by Prosper Mérimée, later an opera of the same name
- Zeke Falcone, a fictional character from the U.S. TV sitcom Zeke and Luther

== Places ==
- Falcone, Sicily, a city in the Province of Messina, Sicily
- Falcone-Borsellino Airport, alternate name of the Palermo Airport (Italy), after Giovanni Falcone and Paolo Borsellino
- Morvillo Falcone High School, Brindisi, Italy; where the 2012 Morvillo Falcone school bombing happened
- Monte Pian Falcone, a mountain in Italy
- 60183 Falcone, the asteroid Falcone, a main belt asteroid, the 60183rd asteroid registered

== Entertainment ==
- Falcone (TV series), a short-lived 2000 TV series addressing the experiences of FBI undercover agent Joseph D. Pistone, whose story was also told in the film Donnie Brasco
- Falcone (film), a 1999 telefilm
- Leonard Falcone International Tuba and Euphonium Festival, amateur festival held at the Blue Lake Fine Arts Camp at Twin Lake, Michigan, United States
- Mateo Falcone, a 1906–1907 opera by César Cui

== See also ==
- Mario Falcone (disambiguation)
- Falconi (surname)
- Falcon (disambiguation)
- Falconer (disambiguation)
- Falcones (disambiguation)
- Falconet (disambiguation)
- Falkner (disambiguation)
- Faulkner (disambiguation)
- Faulknor (disambiguation)
- Fawkner (disambiguation)
