= John Falconer =

John Falconer may refer to:

- John Falconer (merchant) (fl. 1547), English merchant and botanist
- John Falconer (Jesuit) (1577–1656), English Jesuit
- John Falconer (bishop) (ca. 1660–1723), Prelate of the Scottish Episcopal Church
- John Mackie Falconer (1820–1903), etcher, painter and watercolourist
- John Falconer (MP) (1674–1764), Member of Parliament for Kincardineshire
- John A. Falconer (1844–1900), American soldier in the American Civil War
- John Downie Falconer (1876–1947), Scottish geologist and geographer
- John Ireland Falconer (1879–1954), Lord Provost of Edinburgh
- John Falconer (footballer) (1902–1982), Scottish footballer
- John Falconer (actor), including roles in The Pied Piper
- John Falconer (poker player) (born c. 1955), British poker player
- John Falconer, a character in On the Run

== See also ==
- Falconer (surname)
- John Falkner (disambiguation)
- John Fauconer (fl. 1421), MP for Devizes
