= Falkner =

Falkner (German for "falconer") may refer to:

== People with the surname ==
- Adam Falkner (author), American author
- Allen Falkner (born 1969), American artist
- Brian Falkner (author) (born 1962), popular New Zealand children's author
- Brian Falkner, common misspelling of the name of Brian Faulkner, Baron Faulkner of Downpatrick (1921–1977), Prime Minister of Northern Ireland
- Elizabeth Falkner, American Pastry Chef
- Ernst Falkner (1909–1950), German politician
- Frank Falkner, British-born American biologist and pediatrician
- Harold Falkner, early 20th-century British architect
- Jason Falkner (born 1968), American pop and rock musician
- J. Meade Falkner (1858–1932), English novelist and poet, best known for his 1898 novel, Moonfleet
- Keith Falkner (1900–1994), English bass-baritone singer
- Kelly Falkner (born 1960), American chemical oceanographer and educator
- Kishwer Falkner, Baroness Falkner of Margravine (born 1955), British politician
- Margreth Falkner (born 1975), Austrian politician
- Maria Smith-Falkner (1878–1968), Russian economist
- Monica Falkner, New Zealand netball player
- Nick Falkner (born 1962), English cricketer
- Peter Falkner (fl. 1470–1480), German fencing master
- Thomas Falkner (1707–1784), English missionary
- William Falkner (disambiguation), any of several people of the same name

== Fictional characters ==
- Dick Falkner, protagonist of the 1902–03 novel That Printer of Udell's by Harold Bell Wright
- Falkner (Pokémon), a character in the Pokémon universe

== Places ==
- Cima Falkner, a mountain in Italy
- Falkner, Mississippi, a town in the United States
- Falkner Island, in Long Island Sound off Connecticut, United States
- Falkner Island Light, a lighthouse on Falkner Island, Connecticut, United States
- Falkner Square, a square in Liverpool, England, United Kingdom
- Falkner Glacier, a glacier in Victoria Land, Antarctica

== Literature ==
- Falkner (novel), a 19th-century novel by Mary Shelley

== See also ==
- Falconer (disambiguation)
- Faulkner (disambiguation)
- Faulconer (surname)
- Faulknor (disambiguation)
- Fawkner (disambiguation)
