= William Falkner =

William Falkner may refer to:

- William Faulkner (born William Cuthbert Falkner, 1897–1962), American author
- William Falkner (divine) (died 1682), English cleric with the Anglican Church
- William Clark Falkner (c. 1826–1889), American soldier, businessman, author and the great-grandfather of William Faulkner
- Bill Falkner, member of the Missouri House of Representatives

== See also ==
- William Faulkner (disambiguation)
- William Falconer (disambiguation)
- Falkner (disambiguation)
