= Falconer =

Falconer may refer to:

- A person skilled in the art of falconry

== People ==
- Falconer (surname), a family name
- Falconer Larkworthy (1833–1928), New Zealand banker and financier
- Falconer Madan (1851—1935), librarian of the Bodleian Library of Oxford University
- Charlie Falconer, Baron Falconer of Thoroton, a British politician

== Places ==
- Falconer, New York, United States, a village
- Mount Falconer, Victoria Land, Antarctica

== Arts and entertainment ==
- The Falconer (Simonds), a bronze sculpture in Central Park, New York City
- The Falconer (Hansen), a bronze sculpture in Portland, Oregon
- Falconer (band), a power metal band from Sweden
- Falconer (album), an album by the band
- Falconer (novel), a novel by John Cheever
- "The Falconer", a recurring sketch on the TV program Saturday Night Live
- The Falconer (1997 film), with Iain Sinclair
- The Falconer (film), a 2021 film

== Military ==
- AN/USQ-163 Falconer, a weapon system used by the United States Air Force Air and Space Operations Center
- Operation Falconer, the Australian contribution to the 2003 invasion of Iraq
- MQM-57 Falconer, a target drone in the Radioplane BTT family

== Other uses ==
- Falconer School, a boys school in Hertfordshire, England
- Falconer, a Torrey Pines High School newspaper

== See also ==
- Lord Falconer of Halkerton, a title in the Scottish peerage
- AWM/MAA Falconer Lecturer, lectures founded in 1996 named after Etta Z. Falconer
- Grand Falconer (disambiguation), a European position or title
- Falcon (disambiguation)
- Falkner (disambiguation)
- Faulkner (disambiguation)
- Faulknor (disambiguation)
- Fawkner (disambiguation)
- Faulconer (disambiguation)
