= Paul-Loup =

Paul-Loup is a masculine given name. Notable people with the name include:

- Paul-Loup Chatin, French racing driver
- Paul-Loup Sulitzer (1946–2025), French financier and author
