= Jean-Christophe Mitterrand =

Son of François Mitterrand

- Born: 19 December 1946 (age 79); Boulogne-Billancourt, France
- Other name: Papamadit
- Occupations: Journalist, businessman
- Known for: Angolagate
- Parent(s): François Mitterrand; Danielle Gouze
- Relatives: Mazarine Pingeot (half-sister); Frédéric Mitterrand (cousin)

Jean-Christophe Mitterrand (born 19 December 1946) is the son of former French president François Mitterrand. He was an advisor to his father on African affairs from 1986 to 1992, and earned the nickname Papamadit (which translates as "Daddy-told-me") in Africa.

== Life and career ==
Mitterrand was born in Boulogne-Billancourt, Hauts-de-Seine. He was a press correspondent for the Agence France Presse in 1975 in Mauritania. In 1986, he became his father's advisor on African affairs. In this capacity, he was responsible for maintaining relations with African strongmen to maintain French influence in Africa; for instance, Jean-Christophe Mitterrand became a personal friend of Togolese dictator Gnassingbé Eyadéma.

=== Angolagate ===
In the 1990s, Jean-Christophe Mitterrand, along with Russian businessman Arcadi Gaydamak, was implicated in the Angolagate arms dealing scandal. He was indicted in 1993 by the French justice in this case, suspected of having used his influence to help Pierre Falcone sell Russian weapons to José Eduardo dos Santos's government (Angola). On 22 December 2000, he was imprisoned in the Santé prison in Paris, on orders of the magistrate Philippe Courroye, on charges of "complicity of arms traffic, trafic d'influence (influence peddling) and trafic d'influence aggravé (aggravated influence peddling)." He was suspected of having received important sums of money in 1993 and 1994 for his role as an intermediary in this contract, and has recognized having received US$1.8 million (13 million Francs) from the Brenco on a Swiss bank account—although he denied any participation to an arms deal.

Jean-Christophe Mitterrand was freed three weeks later, on 11 January 2001, after his mother, Danielle Mitterrand, managed to post a bail 5 million francs (€762,000). However, he was indicted again on July 4, 2001, on charges of "complicity of arms traffic" by the magistrates Philippe Courroye and Isabelle Prévost-Desprez, following a complaint filed in January 2001 by the Socialist Minister of Defence Alain Richard.

Jean-Christophe Mitterrand was again indicted on 17 October 2001, for corruption by investigative judge Courroye, suspected of having received US$300,000 from the Brenco in payment of councils to Falcone. On the eve of this new indictment, Jean-Christophe Mitterrand filed a complaint against Judge Courroye accusing him of having made a "false" document in July 2000 (because Courroye had put the date of 3 July for an ordinance drafted on 5 July)—but this manoeuver did not stop the procedure.

On 13 January 2006, the Court of Appeal of Paris confirmed the initial sentence. On 27 October 2006, the Court of Cassation rejected Mitterrand's appeal, and confirmed his 30-month prison sentence on probation, along with a €600,000 fine for tax evasion (fraude fiscale) because of €600,000 received from Falcone but not declared to the Fisc tax administration.
