= Faulkner (disambiguation) =

William Faulkner was an American author.

Faulkner may also refer to:

- Faulkner (surname), an English surname (and list of people with that name)
- Faulkner (band), an alternative band
- Faulkner County, Arkansas, a county in the United States
- Faulkner, Maryland, an unincorporated location in the United States
- Faulkner, West Virginia
- Faulkner University, a university in Montgomery, Alabama, United States

== See also ==
- Falcone (disambiguation)
- Falconer (disambiguation)
- Falkner (disambiguation)
- Faulkner Act (Council-Manager), a Faulkner Act form
- Faulkner Act (Mayor-Council), a Faulkner Act form
- Faulkner Act (Mayor-Council-Administrator), a Faulkner Act form
- Faulkner Act (New Jersey), a New Jersey municipal charter law, named after Bayard H. Faulkner
- Faulkner Act (Small Municipality), a Faulkner Act form
- Faulkner-Blanchard, a 1910 automobile
- Faulkner Homestead, a 1707 historic house in Acton, Massachusetts, United States
- Faulkner Hospital, a teaching hospital in Boston, Massachusetts, United States
- Faulkner ministry, sixth Government or Executive Committee of the Privy Council of Northern Ireland, ruled between March 1971 and March 1972
- Faulkner State Community College, a public college in Baldwin County, Alabama, United States
- Faulknor (disambiguation)
- Faux Faulkner contest, a parody competition in which entrants mimic William Faulkner's writing style
- Fawkner (disambiguation)
- Motte v. Faulkner, a 1735 lawsuit over the publishing rights of Jonathan Swift's works
- PEN/Faulkner Award for Fiction, an American literary award first awarded in 1981
- William Faulkner Foundation award, an American literary award first awarded in 1961
