= Falconi =

Falconi is the surname of the following people

- Armando Falconi (1871–1954), Italian stage and film actor
- Arturo Falconi (1867–1934), Italian stage and film actor
- Carlo Falconi (1915–1998), Italian journalist and writer
- Dino Falconi (1902–1990), Italian screenwriter and film director
- Enrique Falconí Mejía, Peruvian politician in the late 1970s
- Fander Falconí (born 1962), Ecuadorian economist and politician
- Francesco Falconi (born 1976), Italian fantasy writer
- Irina Falconi (born 1990), American tennis player
- Juan Falconí Puig, Ecuadorian jurist, politician, businessman and writer
- María Inés Falconi (born 1954), Argentine writer and theatre director
- Mario Falconi, Italian Roman Catholic priest
- Pedro de Oviedo Falconi (died 1649), Roman Catholic prelate
- Ricardo Falconi (born 1962), Chilean modern pentathlete
- Romina Falconi (born 1985), Italian electropop singer-songwriter

== See also ==
- Falcone (disambiguation)
