= Falcones =

Falcones may refer to:

== People ==
- Baldomero Falcones (born 1946) Spanish businessman
- Ildefonso Falcones (born 1959) Spanish lawyer and author
- Soleil (singer) (born 1983 as Soleil Falcones) Argentinian singer

== Other uses ==
- Arturo Falcones, a fictional Marvel Comics character
- The Falcones (band), a predecessor band to Los Lonely Boys
- Cayo Falcones (Falcons Key), Sabana-Camagüey Archipelago, Cuba

== See also ==
- Pompeii Falcones, an Ancient Roman family
- Sosii Falcones, an Ancient Roman family
- Falconi (surname)
- Falcon (disambiguation)
- Falcone (disambiguation)
