= John Falkner =

John Falkner may refer to:

- John Meade Falkner, English novelist and poet
- John Falconer (Jesuit), also spelled John Falkner

== See also ==
- John Falconer (disambiguation)
