= Colin Falconer =

Colin Falconer may refer to:

- Colin Falconer (bishop) (1623–1686), Scottish bishop
- Colin Falconer (writer) (born 1953), English novelist

== See also ==
- Falconer (surname)
