= Adam Faulkner =

Adam Faulkner or Falkner may refer to:

- Adam Faulkner (swimmer) (born 1981), from Australia
- Adam Faulkner (Saw), a character in the Saw movies

== See also ==
- Adam Falkner, American author
- Adam Falkner, musician in Babyshambles and One Eskimo
- Adam Faulconer, fictional character
