= Thomas Faulkner =

Thomas Faulkner may refer to:

- Thomas Faulkner (topographer) (1777–1855), English bookseller and topographer
- Thomas J. R. Faulkner (1869–1943), Liberian politician
- Tom Faulkner (c. 1719–1785), English cricketer, wrestler and boxer

== See also ==
- Thomas Falconer (disambiguation)
