= Thomas Falconer =

Thomas Falconer may refer to:

- Thomas Falconer (jurist) (1805–1882), English jurist and explorer
- Thomas Falconer (classical scholar, born 1772) (1772–1839), English clergyman and classical scholar
- Thomas Falconer (classical scholar, born 1738) (1738–1792), English classical scholar

== See also ==
- Thomas Falkner (1707–1784), English Jesuit missionary
- Thomas Faulkner (disambiguation)
