= Mario Falcone (disambiguation) =

Mario Falcone is an English television personality known for starring in The Only Way Is Essex.

Mario Falcone or Mario Falconi may also refer to:

- Mario Falcone (DC Comics), fictional character in the DC Universe
- Mario Falcone, Italian screenwriter for the films Einstein and Ferrari, and the miniseries Anita Garibaldi

== See also ==
- Mario Falconi, priest
