= Mitterrand–Pasqua affair =

1990s political scandal in France

The Mitterrand–Pasqua affair, also known informally as Angolagate, was an international political scandal over the secret sale and shipment of arms from Central Europe to the government of Angola by the Government of France in the 1990s. The scandal has been tied to several prominent figures in French politics.

The scandal blew up when Interior Minister Charles Pasqua endorsed Édouard Balladur, who was Jacques Chirac's rival in the 1995 French presidential election. Chirac supporters told the French Tax Office about weapon dealer Pierre Falcone's arms shipments and alleged income tax evasion. In December 2000, Falcone was arrested on charges of tax fraud.

In April 2007, 42 people were indicted, including Jean-Christophe Mitterrand, Jacques Attali, Charles Pasqua, Jean-Charles Marchiani, and the writer Paul-Loup Sulitzer for having received illegal payments from Falcone. Arcadi Gaydamak and Falcone were also indicted. The Union for a Popular Movement deputy Georges Fenech was charged of having received €15,200 in 1997 from Brenco. In 2009, 36 individuals were convicted of various levels of involvement, Charles Pasqua and Jean-Charles Marchiani were found guilty of taking money from Gaydamak and Falcone that they knew was proceeds of crime.

== Bicesse Accords ==
President José Eduardo dos Santos of Angola met Jonas Savimbi of UNITA in Bicesse/Portugal and signed the Bicesse Accords, a peace agreement that attempted unsuccessfully to end the Angolan Civil War, on May 31, 1991, with the mediation of the Portuguese government. The accords laid out a transition to multi-party democracy under the supervision of the United Nations' UNAVEM II mission with a presidential election in a year.

The accords attempted to demobilise the 152,000 active fighters and integrate the remaining government troops and UNITA rebels into a 50,000-strong Angolan Armed Forces (FAA). The FAA would consist of a national army with 40,000 troops, navy with 6,000, and air force with 4,000. While UNITA largely did not disarm, the FAA complied with the accord and demobilised, leaving the government disadvantaged. At the same time, the Cuban troops that had helped MPLA forces to push back the South African army and UNITA rebels during the Battle of Cuito Cuanavale, completed their withdrawal from Angola. This meant that the MPLA would have an even greater disadvantage if fighting resumed (as they were aligned with the FAA).

Angola held a presidential election in 1992. In the first round dos Santos officially received 49.57% of the vote and Savimbi won 40.6%. Savimbi said the election had neither been free nor fair and refused to participate in the second round. International observers, however, affirmed that the elections had been largely free and fair. Savimbi, along with eight opposition parties and many other election observers, said the election had been neither free nor fair. The MPLA massacred over ten thousand UNITA and FNLA voters nationwide in a few days in what was known as the Halloween Massacre. UNITA renewed its guerrilla war, capturing five of Angola's eighteen provincial capitals.

== Arms sales ==
With the MPLA on the verge of defeat, dos Santos contacted Jean-Bernard Curial, the former French Socialist Party Southern Africa expert, and asked him to come to Luanda. When he came back, Curial, supportive of dos Santos, contacted members of the government, President's advisor for African Affairs, Bruno Delahe and Jean-Christophe Mitterrand, son of then-President François Mitterrand. Jean-Christophe referred Curial to Pierre Falcone, head of Brenco International, a consortium of companies, and adviser to Sofremi a parastatal run by the right-wing Interior Minister Charles Pasqua. Pasqua believed that in the early 1990s the U.S. government's support for UNITA had diminished while tacit support for the MPLA increased because peace would increase oil output. He argued that if Mitterrand's position on Angola did not change in kind, French oil companies would miss out on a vital opportunity.

Jean-Christophe's lawyer says that Jean-Christophe Mitterrand first met Falcone after he stopped working as an expert on Africa for the Élysée. Falcone and Jean-Christophe Mitterrand first met in July 1992 in Phoenix, Arizona, after he left his charges as President's advisor for African Affairs. At that time he was with his family, on holiday, in the United States, with a relation who was an employee of Thomson-CSF, a French arms and electronics company. He introduced Jean-Christophe Mitterrand to his friend Pierre Falcone during a dinner at his home in Scottsdale in July 1992. At that time Jean-Christophe Mitterrand was free of government charges until May 1992, and had already signed a contract with a private French company (La Compagnie Générale des Eaux).

After the Angolan elections (see above), Curial met Falcone, who went to Angola for the first time and organised for the Angolan government a successful pre-paid operation in oil dealing. Later the Angolan government gave him an official mission to supervise supplying his army with arms from the East Central European country Slovakia and the population with food and medicine. The Angolan government bought USD $47 million worth of ammunition, mortar, and artillery from the Slovak company ZTS OSOS on November 7, 1993, which dos Santos received in December. In April 1994 the government bought $463 million worth of fighter aircraft and tanks. By late 1994 the Angolan government had purchased $633 million worth of weapons.

Dos Santos secretly had Elísio de Figueiredo, the former ambassador of Angola to France, act as Angola's envoy to friendly contacts in France. Falcone worked with the Angolan government through Figueiredo.

== Scandal uncovered ==
Jean-Charles Marchiani, Pasqua's subordinate, allegedly went to Luanda and signed an agreement with dos Santos on November 29, 1994, that promised to organise a better relationship with the French government in which some ministers, Leotard (defence minister), and Alain Madelin (Minister for finances) had openly supported Jonas Savimbi for many years. In exchange, they seemed to receive Angolese political and financial agreement for Pasqua's party, which was running for European elections. Then, Jacques Chirac planned to run for president in the 1995 election. When Pasqua endorsed Édouard Balladur, Chirac's rival, Chirac's supporters told the French Tax Office about Falcone's arms shipments and alleged income tax evasion. While there is agreement that no arms ever passed through France, the Tax Office investigated individuals connected with the scandal because agreements were allegedly signed in Paris. Allain Guilloux, Brenco International's fiscal lawyer in France, said that the Angolan government had agreed to Marchiani's deal in Luanda, not Paris.

In 1996, the French Financial Brigades confiscated 50,000 documents from the offices of Falcone and Arcadi Gaydamak, a Russian–Israeli businessman and associate of Falcone.

=== Arrest and trial ===
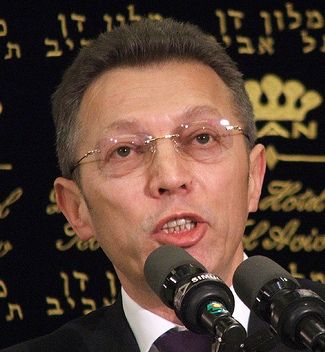
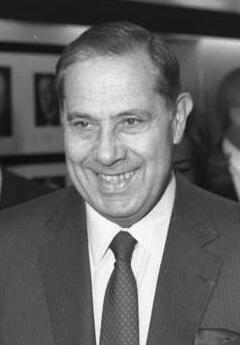
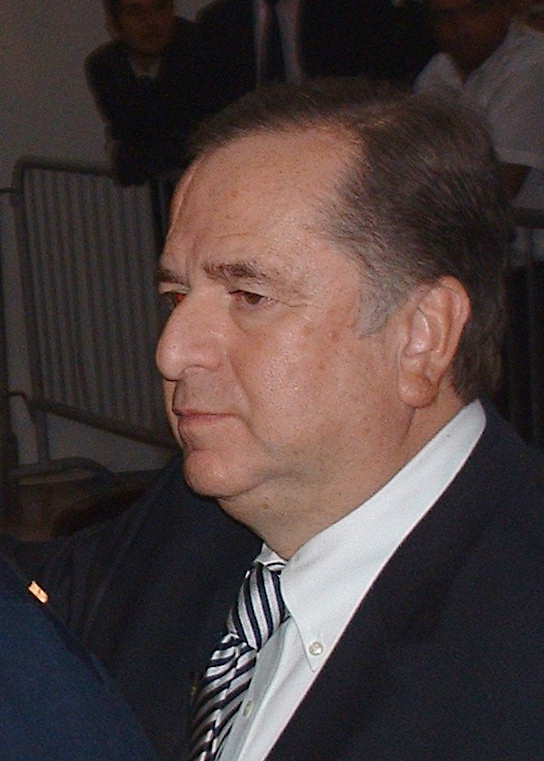
Arcadi Gaydamak (left), Charles Pasqua (centre) and Paul-Loup Sulitzer (right)

French police arrested Falcone on December 1, 2000, on charges of tax fraud. Seven days later, the French government issued a warrant for the arrest of Gaydamak. French police arrested Jean-Christophe Mitterrand on December 21 for his supposed role in the arms deal but released him on January 11 after his mother had paid his $725,000 bail. A judge found Mitterrand guilty in 2004 of tax fraud and gave him a suspended sentence of 30 months in prison.

In April 2007, the investigative magistrate Philippe Courroye indicted 42 people, including Jean-Christophe Mitterrand, Jacques Attali, Charles Pasqua and Jean-Charles Marchiani, for having received illegal payments from Pierre Falcone. Arcadi Gaydamak and Falcone were also indicted. The writer Paul-Loup Sulitzer was also indicted and charged of having received €380,000 from Falcone. The Union for a Popular Movement deputy Georges Fenech was charged of having received €15,200 in 1997 from Brenco. The trial started in 2008, in absentia of Gaydamak who left for Israel.

Sulitzer admitted taking €300,000 in return for information in December 2008 and testified against Falcone. He accused prosecutors of "trying to kill a mosquito with a nuclear bomb".

=== Sentencing ===
The sentences for the "Angolagate affair" were handed down on October 27, 2009. Charles Pasqua and Jean-Charles Marchiani were found guilty of taking money from Gaydamak and Falcone that they knew was proceeds of crime. Pasqua was sentenced to three years in prison, two of which were suspended and a €100,000 fine. Marchiani was sentenced to three months in prison. Gaydamak and Falcone were found guilty of illegal arms deals, tax fraud, money laundering, embezzlement and others, sentenced to six years in prison and multi-million-euro fines each. Gaydamak was sentenced in absentia, and it was unclear whether he would ever serve the prison term, because of Israeli extradition law changing in the interim. In November 2015, Gaydamak, through presenting himself, began a 3-year sentence in prison.

Falcone, who tried and failed to claim diplomatic immunity in the case, was taken into custody by police after the judge had finished reading out the sentences. Jean-Christophe Mitterrand was found guilty of receiving $2 million from Falcone and Gaydamak to promote their interests and was sentenced to a two-year suspended sentence and a €375,000 fine. Paul-Loup Sulitzer was found guilty of embezzlement and sentenced to 15 months in prison and a €100,000 fine. Jacques Attali and Georges Fenech were acquitted.

In total, 36 individuals were convicted of various levels of involvement in the scandal, 21 of whom appealed the decision.

=== Appeal decision ===
The Paris Court of Appeal's decision was given on April 29, 2011, and its findings were quite different. The Paris Court of Appeal overturned the convictions of former Interior Minister Charles Pasqua and of Jean-Charles Marchiani. The charges against Pierre Falcone and Arcadi Gaydamak were also dropped. The Court of Appeal particularly recognized that they had acted under the authority of a "state mandate" issued by the Angolan government, which sought to "ensure the survival" of the country and that it was "in that context and while the situation worsened" that it had asked Pierre Falcone and Arcadi Gaydamak to acquire arms, food and medicine.

== See also ==
- Françafrique
- French political scandals
- Iskandar Safa
- ZTS-OSOS
