= William Falconer =

William Falconer may refer to:

- William Falconer (poet) (1732–1769), Scottish poet
- William Falconer (writer) (1744–1824), English physician, miscellaneous writer, and Fellow of the Royal Society
- William Falconer (translator) (1801–1885), English clergymen and academic
- William Falconer, 6th Lord Falconer of Halkerton (1712–1776), English aristocrat
- William Falconer (bishop) (1707–1784), Scottish clergyman
- Willie Falconer (born 1966), Scottish footballer

== See also ==
- William Faulkner (disambiguation)
- Falconer (surname)
