= Elizabeth Best =

Australian writer (born 1977)

- Born: 1977 (age 48–49) Bendigo, Victoria, Australia
- Occupation: Author
- Years active: 2002–present
- Notable works: Eli's Wings (2002); The Year We Seized the Day (2007)
- Relatives: Ron Best

Elizabeth Best is an Australian author from Bendigo, Victoria.

The Year We Seized the Day (2007) co-authored with Colin Bowles, is a non-fiction travel book describing the two authors' shared journey along the Camino de Santiago. It is an Amazon.com bestseller and continues to sell internationally.

Eli's Wings was first published by Penguin Books Australia Ltd. 2002. It became a bestseller on release and earned several reprints and new additions, and was published internationally. Eli's Wings chronicles Best's personal struggle with and full recovery from, a life threatening case of anorexia and how she overcame it: "Eli was an alter ego I created," Best said. "I hated absolutely everything about myself. Eli was a blueprint for who I wanted to be."

Best is the daughter of Ron Best, who was an Australian politician and Australian rules footballer.
