= The Year We Seized the Day =

Book by Elizabeth Best and Colin Bowles

The Year We Seized the Day: A True Story of Friendship and Renewal on the Camino
- Author: Elizabeth Best; Colin Bowles
- Language: English
- Subject: Friendship; Camino de Santiago
- Genre: Non-fiction
- Publisher: Allen & Unwin Australia
- Publication date: 2007
- Publication place: Australia
- Media type: Print, ebook
- ISBN: 9781741750683 First edition

The Year We Seized the Day: A True Story of Friendship and Renewal on the Camino is a book by two Australian authors, Elizabeth Best and Colin Bowles about their 800 km trek on foot along the pilgrim route, the Camino de Santiago. The book was first published in 2007 by Allen & Unwin Australia and a new edition followed in 2010.

== Synopsis ==
The book, written by Best and Bowles, follows the two authors as they take a pilgrimage trip in Spain, on the Camino de Santiago. The two find the trip more difficult than they initially thought, but struggle through it together and with several other pilgrims also taking the same route.

== Release ==
The Year We Seized the Day was first published in Australia during 2007 by Allen & Unwin Australia, under the title The Year We Seized the Day: A True Story of Friendship, Fury and Sore Feet. This would later be retitled The Year We Seized the Day: A True Story of Friendship and Renewal on the Camino for the new edition released in 2010, also by Allen & Unwin Australia.

== Reception ==
The Year We Seized the Day has received reviews from The Sydney Morning Herald, Wet Ink, The Courier-Mail, The Weekend Australian, and Sun Herald.
