= Edward Evanson =

English clergyman (1731-1805)

Edward Evanson (21 April 1731 – 25 September 1805) was a controversial English clergyman.

== Life ==
He was born at Warrington, Lancashire. After graduating at Emmanuel College, Cambridge and taking holy orders, he spent several years as curate at Mitcham in Surrey. In 1768 he became vicar of South Mimms near Barnet; and in November 1769 he was presented to the rectory of Tewkesbury, with which he held also the vicarage of Longdon in Worcestershire. In the course of his studies he discovered what he thought important variance between the teaching of the Church of England and that of the Bible, and he did not conceal his convictions. In reading the service he altered or omitted phrases which seemed to him untrue, and in reading the Scriptures pointed out errors in the translation.

A crisis was brought on by his sermon on the resurrection, preached at Easter 1773; and in November 1773 a prosecution was instituted against him in the consistory court of Gloucester. He was charged with depraving the public worship of God contained in the liturgy of the Church of England, asserting the same to be superstitious and unchristian, preaching, writing and conversing against the creeds and the divinity of our Saviour, and assuming to himself the power of making arbitrary alterations in his performance of the public worship. A protest was at once signed and published by a large number of his parishioners against the prosecution. The case was dismissed on technical grounds, but appeals were made to the court of arches and the court of delegates. Meanwhile, Evanson had made his views generally known by several publications.

In his later years he ministered to a Unitarian congregation at Lympston, Devonshire. In 1802 he published Reflections upon the State of Religion in Christendom, in which he attempted to explain and illustrate the mysterious foreshadowing of the Apocalypse. This he considered the most important of his writings. Shortly before his death at Colford, near Crediton, Devon, he completed his Second Thoughts on the Trinity, in reply to a work of the bishop of Gloucester.

== Works ==
In 1772 he anonymously published his Doctrines of a Trinity and in the Incarnation of God, discussed Principles of Reason and Common Sense. This was followed in 1777 by a work addressed to Richard Hurd, A Letter to Dr. Hurd, Bishop of Worcester, wherein the Importance of the Prophecies of the old Testament and the Nature of the Grand Apostasy predicted in them are discussed. He also wrote some papers on the Sabbath, which brought him into controversy with Joseph Priestley, who published the whole discussion (1792). In the same year appeared Evanson's work entitled The Dissonance of the four generally received Evangelists, to which replies were published by Priestley and David Simpson (1793). Evanson rejected most of the books of the New Testament as forgeries, and of the four gospels he accepted only the Gospel of Luke.

His sermons (prefaced by a Life by G. Rogers) were published in two volumes in 1807, and were the occasion of Thomas Falconer's Bampton Lectures in 1810. A narrative of the circumstances which led to the prosecution of Evanson was published by N. Havard, the town-clerk of Tewkesbury, in 1778.
