= Monte Pian Falcone =

Mountain in Italy

- Location within Italy

Highest point
- Elevation: 1,854 m (6,083 ft)
- Coordinates: 42°50′53″N 13°10′05″E

Geography
- Location: Marche, Italy
- Parent range: Apennines

Monte Pian Falcone is a mountain of Marche, Italy. It is 1,854 meters tall.
