= 1931–32 Celtic F.C. season =

Celtic
1931–32 season
- Manager: Willie Maley
- Stadium: Celtic Park
- Scottish First Division: 3rd
- Scottish Cup: Third round
Home colours	Away colours

The 1931–32 Scottish football season was Celtic's 44th season of competitive football, in which they competed in the Scottish First Division and the Scottish Cup.

Celtic hoped to mount a challenge for the league title as they had ended last season only two points behind five-in-a-row winners Rangers. However, they ended up third, 18 points off champions Motherwell, who had unsuccessfully challenged Celtic for the Scottish Cup in the previous year's final. This was Motherwell's only league title as of 2025, and the first time someone other than the Old Firm won the league since 1904.

Celtic entered the Scottish Cup as title holders, but couldn't repeat the previous year's success as they lost to Motherwell 2-0 away in the third round.

== Competitions ==
=== Scottish First Division ===
==== League table ====
Pos	Team	Pld	W	D	L	GF	GA	GD	Pts
1	Motherwell	38	30	6	2	119	31	+88	66
2	Rangers	38	28	5	5	118	42	+76	61
3	Celtic	38	20	8	10	94	50	+44	48
4	Third Lanark	38	21	4	13	92	81	+11	46
5	St Mirren	38	20	4	14	77	56	+21	44

==== Matches ====
8 August 1931 First Division	Leith Athletic	0–3	Celtic	Edinburgh
				Stadium: Marine Gardens; Attendance: 21,000

15 August 1931 First Division	Celtic	3–2	Dundee United	Glasgow
				Stadium: Celtic Park; Attendance: 9,000

19 August 1931 First Division	Celtic	3–0	Hearts	Glasgow
				Stadium: Celtic Park; Attendance: 15,000

22 August 1931 First Division	Aberdeen	1–1	Celtic	Aberdeen
				Stadium: Pittodrie Park; Attendance: 28,000

26 August 1931 First Division	Celtic	7–0	Cowdenbeath	Glasgow
				Stadium: Celtic Park; Attendance: 7,000

29 August 1931 First Division	Celtic	6–1	Hamilton Academical	Glasgow
				Stadium: Celtic Park; Attendance: 10,000

2 September 1931 First Division	Third Lanark	3–3	Celtic	Glasgow
				Stadium: Cathkin Park; Attendance: 15,000

5 September 1931 First Division	Rangers	0–0	Celtic	Glasgow
				Stadium: Ibrox Park

12 September 1931 First Division	Celtic	2–2	Queen's Park	Glasgow
				Stadium: Celtic Park; Attendance: 20,000

19 September 1931 First Division	Morton	3–3	Celtic	Greenock
				Stadium: Cappielow Park; Attendance: 10,000

26 September 1931 First Division	Celtic	4–1	Falkirk	Glasgow
				Stadium: Celtic Park; Attendance: 8,000

3 October 1931 First Division	Kilmarnock	2–3	Celtic	Kilmarnock
				Stadium: Rugby Park; Attendance: 20,000

10 October 1931 First Division	Celtic	1–1	Clyde	Glasgow
				Stadium: Celtic Park; Attendance: 6,000

17 October 1931 First Division	Dundee	2–0	Celtic	Dundee
				Stadium: Dens Park; Attendance: 18,000

24 October 1931 First Division	Celtic	4–2	Ayr United	Glasgow
				Stadium: Celtic Park; Attendance: 7,000

31 October 1931 First Division	Motherwell	2–2	Celtic	Motherwell
				Stadium: Fir Park; Attendance: 25,000

14 November 1931 First Division	Celtic	1–2	Partick Thistle	Glasgow
				Stadium: Celtic Park; Attendance: 7,000

21 November 1931 First Division	Hearts	2–1	Celtic	Edinburgh
				Stadium: Tynecastle Park; Attendance: 31,244

28 November 1931 First Division	Cowdenbeath	1–2	Celtic	Glasgow
				Stadium: Central Park; Attendance: 5,000

5 December 1931 First Division	Celtic	5–0	Third Lanark	Glasgow
				Stadium: Celtic Park; Attendance: 10,000

12 December 1931 First Division	Celtic	6–1	Airdrieonians	Glasgow
				Stadium: Celtic Park; Attendance: 6,000

19 December 1931 First Division	Celtic	6–0	Leith Athletic	Glasgow
				Stadium: Celtic Park; Attendance: 8,000

26 December 1931 First Division	Dundee United	1–0	Celtic	Dundee
				Stadium: Tannadice Park; Attendance: 12,000

1 January 1932 First Division	Celtic	1–2	Rangers	Glasgow
				Stadium: Celtic Park; Attendance: 55,000

2 January 1932 First Division	Queen's Park	0–3	Celtic	Glasgow
				Stadium: Hampden Park; Attendance: 10,000

9 January 1932 First Division	Celtic	2–0	Aberdeen	Glasgow
				Stadium: Celtic Park; Attendance: 7,000

23 January 1932 First Division	Hamilton Academical	1–0	Celtic	Hamilton
				Stadium: Douglas Park; Attendance: 7,000

6 February 1932 First Division	Falkirk	2–0	Celtic	Falkirk
				Stadium: Brockville Park; Attendance: 10,000

20 February 1932 First Division	Clyde	2–1	Celtic	Glasgow
				Stadium: Shawfield Stadium; Attendance: 10,000

27 February 1932 First Division	Celtic	0–2	Dundee	Glasgow
				Stadium: Celtic Park; Attendance: 9,000

5 March 1932 First Division	Ayr United	2–3	Celtic	Ayr
				Stadium: Somerset Park; Attendance: 8,000

12 March 1932 First Division	Celtic	2–4	Motherwell	Glasgow
				Stadium: Celtic Park; Attendance: 25,000

19 March 1932 First Division	St Mirren	1–2	Celtic	Paisley
				Stadium: St Mirren Park, Love Street; Attendance: 10,000

28 March 1932 First Division	Celtic	1–0	St Mirren	Glasgow
				Stadium: Celtic Park; Attendance: 9,000

2 April 1932 First Division	Celtic	6–3	Morton	Glasgow
				Stadium: Celtic Park; Attendance: 4,000

9 April 1932 First Division	Airdrieonians	1–1	Celtic	Airdrie
				Stadium: Broomfield Park; Attendance: 4,000

23 April 1932 First Division	Celtic	4–1	Kilmarnock	Glasgow
				Stadium: Celtic Park; Attendance: 7,000

30 April 1932 First Division	Partick Thistle	0–2	Celtic	Glasgow
				Stadium: Firhill Park; Attendance: 14,000

=== Scottish Cup ===
16 January 1932 First round	Celtic	3–2	Falkirk	Glasgow
				Stadium: Celtic Park; Attendance: 14,000

30 January 1932 Second round	St Johnstone	2–4	Celtic	Perth
				Stadium: Muirton Park; Attendance: 19,158

13 February 1932 Third round	Motherwell	2–0	Celtic	Motherwell
				Stadium: Fir Park; Attendance: 36,000
