= Margreth Falkner =

Austrian politician (born 1975)

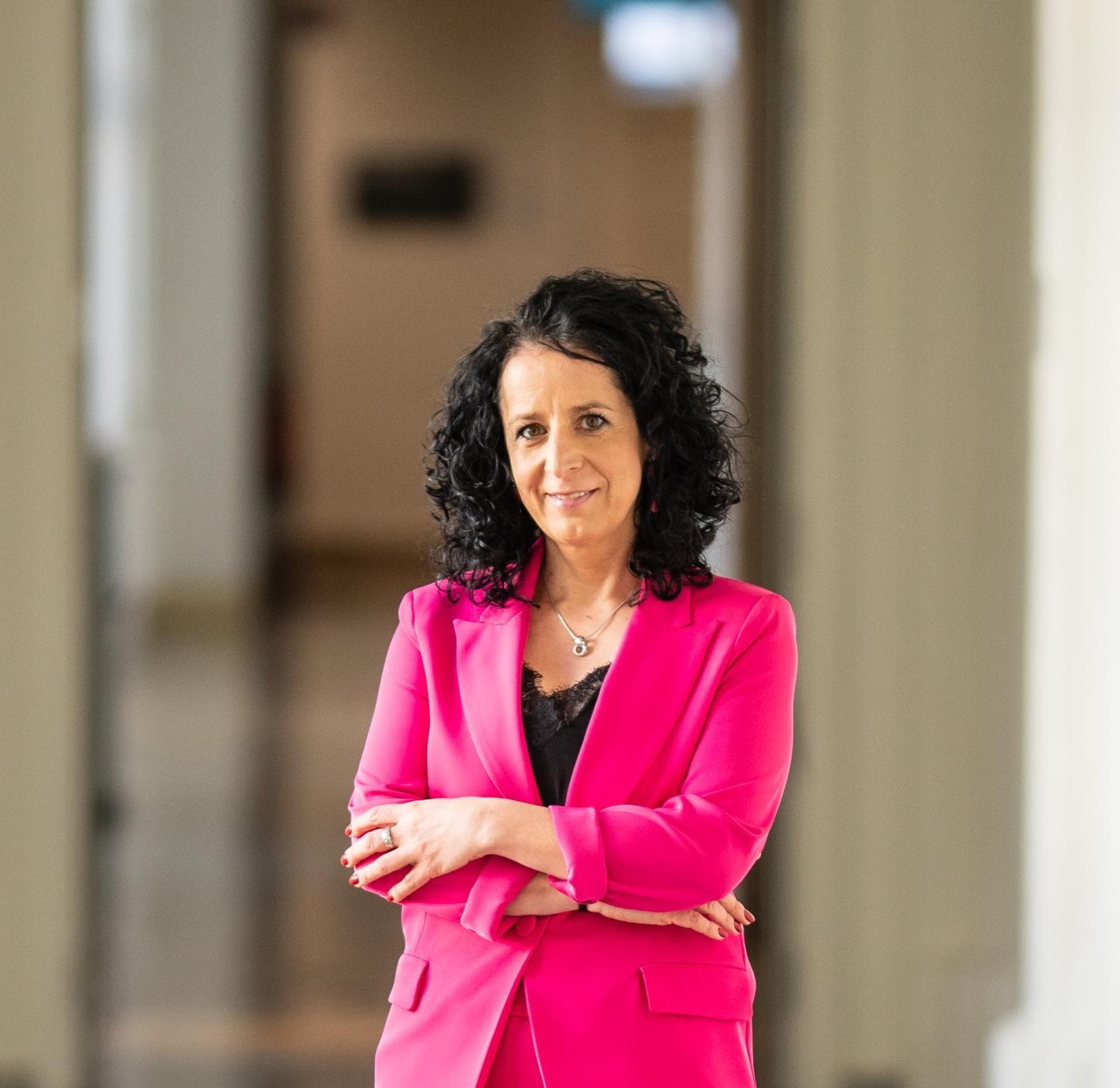

Member of the National Council
- Incumbent
- Assumed office 24 October 2024
- Constituency: Highland

Personal details
- Born: 24 July 1975 (age 50)
- Party: People's Party

Margreth Falkner (born 24 July 1975) is an Austrian politician of the People's Party serving as a member of the National Council since 2024. She is a municipal councillor of Umhausen.
