= Fawkner (disambiguation) =

Fawkner may refer to:

== People ==
- John Pascoe Fawkner (1792-1869), Australian pioneer and politician
- Steve Fawkner, Australian software programmer
- Jonathan Fawkner, British visual effects artist

== Places ==
- Division of Fawkner, Australian electoral division in Victoria, named after John Pascoe Fawkner
- Fawkner, Victoria, a suburb of Melbourne, Australia, named after John Pascoe Fawkner
  - Fawkner railway station
  - Fawkner Crematorium and Memorial Park
  - Fawkner Secondary College, a public secondary school
- Fawkner Park, Melbourne, Australian recreational area, named after John Pascoe Fawkner
- Fawkner Secondary College, a public secondary school in Fawkner, Victoria, Australia

== Sports ==
- Fawkner Blues, Australian football (soccer) club from Fawkner, Victoria
- Fawkner-Whittlesea Blues, Australian football (soccer) club from Epping, Victoria

== See also ==
- Falconer (disambiguation)
- Falkner (disambiguation)
- Faulkner (disambiguation)
- Faulknor (disambiguation)
- Faulconer (disambiguation)
