= Adam Falkner =

American writer

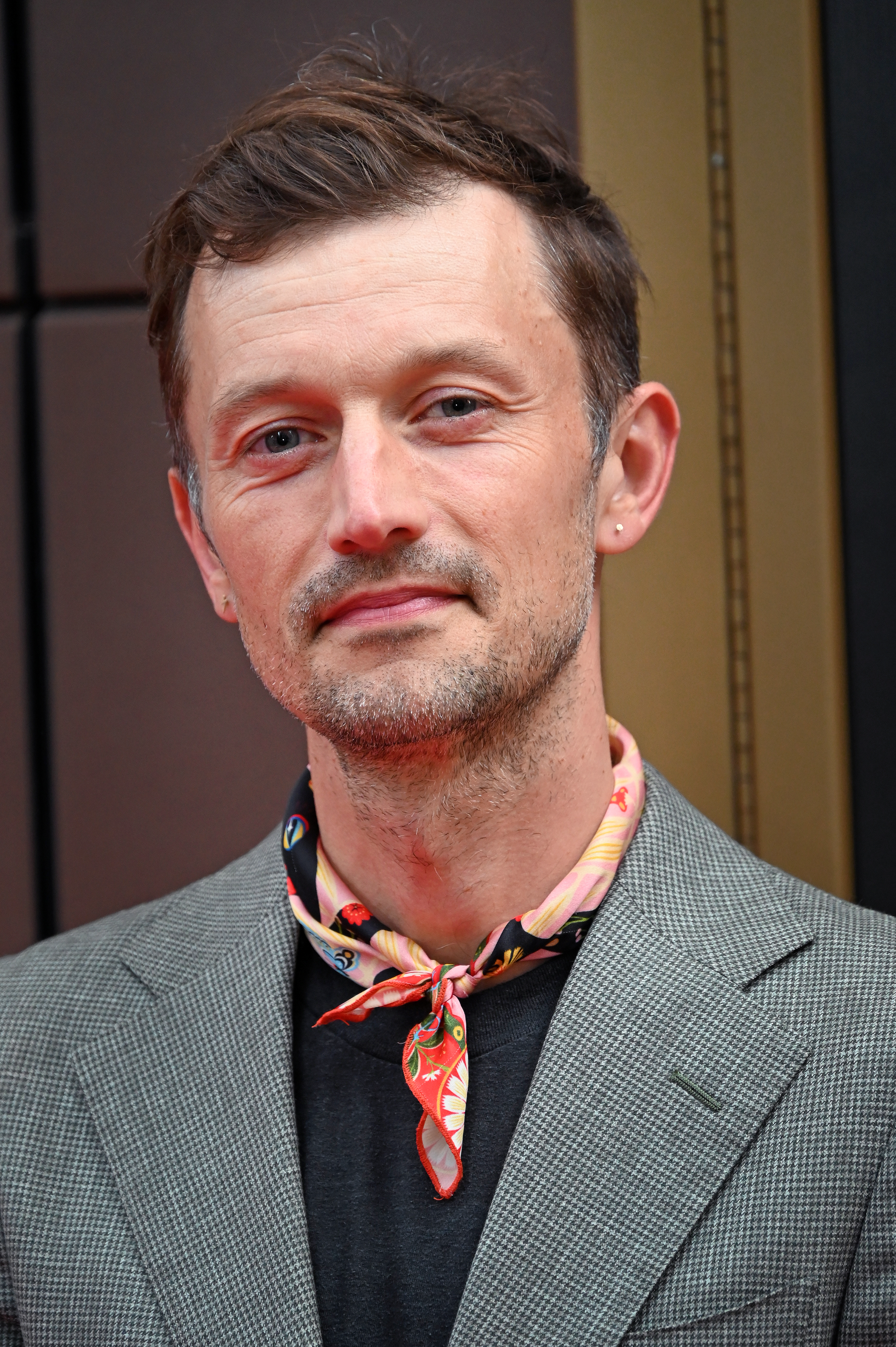
- Falkner in 2026
- Born: Ann Arbor, Michigan, U.S.
- Occupation: Writer
- Notable work: The Willies

Adam Falkner is an American writer, poet, artist, and educator.

Falkner is a Pushcart Prize nominee. His work has appeared in The New York Times, and he has been a featured performer at President Barack Obama's Grassroots Ball at the 2009 Presidential Inauguration.

== Education ==
Falkner is from Ann Arbor, Michigan, and attended the University of Michigan as an undergraduate student. He holds a MA in English from Brooklyn College, and a PhD in English & Education from Columbia University.

== Career ==
Falkner's writing and work focus on intersectional themes of race, gender, queer life and social justice education.

=== Writing ===
Falkner's book, The Willies, is a portrait of the "journey into queerhood" in America. The book has received praise from National Book Award-winning author Andrew Solomon, and from writers and critics Saeed Jones, Hanif Abdurraqib, and Patricia Smith for its “vulnerability, determination, lyricism and incisiveness.” The Willies was the winner of the Midwestern Independent Book Award and the Foreword Reviews Gold Medal prize.

Falkner has been nominated for a Pushcart Prize. His work also has appeared in The New York Times and on TED, and he was a featured performer at President Barack Obama's Grassroots Ball at the 2009 Presidential Inauguration.

=== Educational leadership ===
Prior to pursuing doctoral study at Columbia University's Teachers College, Falkner taught high school English in New York City's public schools. He founded the Dialogue Arts Project, and is a national lecturer and consultant around themes of racial equity and culturally empowering education. He has taught English Education and Sociology at Vassar College and Columbia University's Teachers College.

=== Scholarship and research ===
Falkner is a scholar of critical English education. His research, initially under the direction of Dr. Ernest Morrell, examines performance and storytelling rituals in schools and companies as tools to cultivate (and measure impact around) dialogue pertaining to identity, culture and politics.

=== Acting and others ===
Falkner is also an actor and a musician. He has played supporting roles in several films, including Lionsgate's Love, Beats & Rhymes, which starred rappers Azealia Banks and Common.

== Personal life ==
Falkner is gay. He currently lives in Brooklyn, New York.

== Bibliography ==
Books

- The Willies. Button Poetry, 2020

Chapbooks

- Adoption. Diode Editions, 2018
- Ten For Faheem, 2012

Articles

- The Power of Touch. The Guardian, 2020
- Race and Voting Rights: The All-Too Familiar Battle for the Ballet. PBS' World Channel, 2020

Poems

- Love Me A Man Who Cries. Catapult, 2020
- The Year The Wu-Tang Drops. THRUSH, 2017
- Connor Everywhere But. Painted Bride Quarterly, 2012

Anthologized

- Resisting Arrest, University of Georgia Press, 2018
- The BreakBeat Poets: New American Poetry in the Age of Hip Hop. Haymarket Books, 2016
- Uncommon Core: Contemporary Poems for Living and Learning. Red Beard Press, 2014
