= HMS Faulknor =

Three ships of the Royal Navy have borne the name HMS Faulknor after members of the Faulknor family, which included several distinguished naval officers:

- HMS Faulknor (1914) was a Faulknor-class flotilla leader commandeered from the Chilean Navy and launched in 1914. She was returned to Chile in 1920 and commissioned as the Almirante Lynch-class destroyer Almirante Riveros.
- HMS Faulknor (1925) was a river gunboat, previously the civilian Po-on, purchased in 1925 and sold in 1928.
- HMS Faulknor (H62) was an F-class destroyer launched in 1933 and scrapped in 1946.
