= María Inés Falconi =

Argentine writer and theatre director

- Born: 1954 (age 71–72) Buenos Aires, Argentina
- Occupation: Writer and theatre director

María Inés Falconi (born 1954 in Buenos Aires) is an Argentine writer and theatre director for children and young adults.

== Writing ==
Falconi works in Theatre Expression Ateliers for children and teenagers in the Escuela de Teatro de la Universidad Popular de Belgrane. She's coordinator and director of the Atelier La Mancha. She has given conferences for the Children's Theatre in the Universidad Popular de Belgrano, the Universidad Central de Caracas, the Universidad de Maracaibo and in more institutions in South America.

== Works ==
Falconi has written numerous books, including:

- Niños, las brujas no existen (Kids, Witches do not Exist)
- Pajaritos en bandadas (Little Birds in Flocks)
- Caídos del mapa (Fallen from the Map)
- Hasta el domingo (See You on Sunday)
