= Falconet =

Falconet may refer to:

== Birds of prey ==
- Typical falconets (genus Microhierax)
- Spot-winged falconet (genus Spiziapteryx)

== People ==
- Étienne Maurice Falconet (1716–1791), French sculptor
- John Falconet (fl. 1350–1400), English noble
- Peter Falconet (1741–1791), French portrait painter

== Other uses ==
- The Falconet, a 1975 Iranian film
- Falconet (cannon), a light cannon developed in the late 15th century
- Falconet (novel), an unfinished novel by Benjamin Disraeli

== See also ==
- Atlanta Falcons Cheerleaders, originally known as "The Falconettes"
- Falcon (disambiguation)
