= John Falconer (footballer) =

Scottish footballer

Personal information
- Full name: John Gunn Falconer
- Date of birth: 2 January 1902
- Place of birth: Kinning Park, Scotland
- Date of death: 1982 (aged 79–80)
- Place of death: Eastwood, Scotland
- Position: Goalkeeper

Senior career*
Years	Team	Apps	(Gls)
- Gower Thistle
–1919	Ibrox Waverley		
1919–1921	St Anthony's		
1921–1930	Cowdenbeath	204	(0)
1931–1933	Celtic	7	(0)
1933–1934	East Stirlingshire	25	(0)
1934–1935	Creetown		
1935–1936	Stranraer		

International career
1928	Scottish League XI	1	(0)
- * Club domestic league appearances and goals

John Gunn Falconer (2 January 1902 – 1982) was a Scottish professional footballer who made over 200 appearances in the Scottish League for Cowdenbeath as a goalkeeper.

== Career ==
A goalkeeper, Falconer made 204 appearances in the top two divisions of Scottish football for Cowdenbeath in two spells between 1921 and 1928. While with the Fife club, he made one appearance for the Scottish League XI against the Football League XI in March 1928, but six months later his career appeared to have been ended when he sustained a broken kneecap.

He made a return to league football with Celtic in 1931 and was soon unexpectedly back in First Division action when he had to replace John Thomson, who had been fatally injured during a match. However, Joe Kennaway soon arrived at Celtic Park and after a period as his deputy, Falconer moved to Second Division club East Stirlingshire in 1933, where he played for one season.

== Career statistics ==
Appearances and goals by club, season and competition
Club	Season	League			Scottish Cup		Other		Total	
Club	Season	Division	Apps	Goals	Apps	Goals	Apps	Goals	Apps	Goals
Cowdenbeath	1921–22	Scottish Second Division	37	0	3	0	—		40	0
Cowdenbeath	1922–23	Scottish Second Division	36	0	2	0	—		38	0
Cowdenbeath	1924–25	Scottish First Division	14	0	0	0	—		14	0
Cowdenbeath	1925–26	Scottish First Division	36	0	1	0	—		37	0
Cowdenbeath	1926–27	Scottish First Division	37	0	2	0	—		39	0
Cowdenbeath	1927–28	Scottish First Division	35	0	2	0	—		37	0
Cowdenbeath	1928–29	Scottish First Division	9	0	0	0	—		9	0
Cowdenbeath	Total		204	0	10	0	—		214	0
Celtic	1931–32	Scottish First Division	7	0	1	0	3 (Note: Appearances in Glasgow Cup)	0	11	0
East Stirlingshire	1933–34	Scottish Second Division	25	0	1	0	—		26	0
Career total			236	0	12	0	3	0	251	0

== Honours ==
- Cowdenbeath Hall of Fame
