= Sonia Falcone =

Bolivian painter

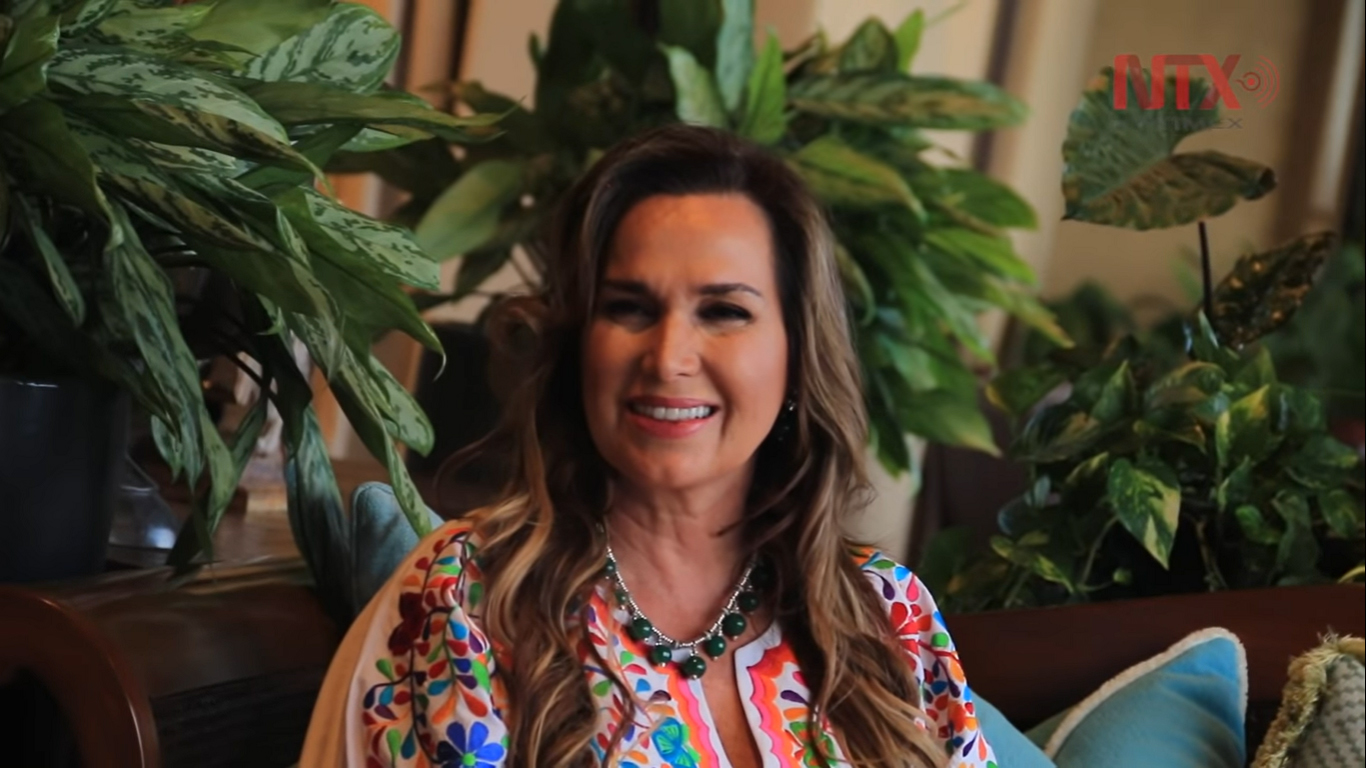
- Born: Sonia Montero; March 27, 1965; Santa Cruz de la Sierra, Bolivia
- Known for: Painting and Installation

Sonia Falcone (born March 27, 1965, in Santa Cruz de la Sierra, Bolivia) is a Bolivian artist known for her painting and installation work. She currently resides in Mexico and is a naturalized Mexican citizen.

== Early life ==
At an early age Falcone moved to the United States where she began to paint. As a child, she wanted to be a dentist; she attended nursing school but finally chose art as her career. Sonia represented her homeland in Japan with the title of Miss Bolivia International 1988. She is an activist for health and education, a supporter and promoter of children's rights, and protector of women who suffered domestic violence.

== Philanthropic work ==
Falcone was invited as a volunteer by the Scottsdale Center for the Arts Museum in Arizona and devoted her time to community projects related to and in support of the arts: improvement and maintenance of the opera, theatre, and the Museum of the city. As a member of the Board, she promoted the involvement of marginalized Latino communities to arts-related tasks. She is the founder of Essanté Corporation (1992-2004), a multinational entity which was established specifically for people seeking better health and greater opportunities in their lives. She is also the founder and president of the AMA Saving the Oceans Foundation, as well as the Sonia Falcone Foundation.

== Artistic career ==
Falcone exhibited her work in PINTA New York City (December 2010), at the Miami International Art Fair (January 2011) and from June 6, in PINTA London (June 2011).

In these exhibitions, Falcone manifests another phase of her personality with her most well-known work, "Windows of the Soul", revealing elements that reflect her life experience. Spirituality is a central element in her work. Her spiritual ideal can be found in all structures, cosmic or individual, organic or inorganic, but achieves its full expression in the human form, shown in her monumental multicolored pieces, with rainbows, snow-capped peaks of the Andes, shadows that banish sunrises, the construction of a world with llamas and fish and where, living the art of war, the sun of justice rose and the drops of blood became art and poetry.

Video Art Installation, a major piece of this artist, participated in the XVII Bienal de Arte de Santa Cruz de la Sierra, where Sonia was invited to participate.

At the beginning of the third millennium, after receiving an honorary doctorate from Trinity College of Graduate Studies in "Spirituality and Psychology", she joined her social and artistic work, viewing art as a tool that could be used not only to understand people's problems, but also to help them think.

"Passions of the Soul", one of her most recent works, achieves a rapport between art and game, trying to reach the adult and the child within by creating metaphors that express a philosophy of life.

Falcone's work has appeared in several collectives, mainly in Phoenix City Government Convention Center– Civic Plaza, invited by the National Hispanic Woman Corporation. She has had solo exhibitions at "The Gallery" in Cabo San Lucas, Mexico.

In 2013 her work was showcased alongside Damien Hirst's at the Moscow Art Fair by the London-based gallery Magdalena Gabriel Fine Arts.

Also in 2013, Falcone's colorful installation using spices and called Campo de Color was part of the Latin American Pavilion at the 2013 Venice Biennale. In 2017, that same installation work was included in the Nevada Museum of Art in Reno, NV group show titled "Unsettled", which also travelled to the Anchorage Museum in Alaska, and California's Palm Springs Art Museum.

In 2015, Falcone, together with artist José Laura Yapita, presented an Aymara language sound installation at the 2015 Venice Biennale.

In 2019 Falcone's solo exhibition - titled Ocean Scapes. Baja Series - was hosted by the Alfredo Ginocchio Gallery in San José del Cabo, Mexico.

== Personnel life ==
Falcone is married to businessman Pierre Falcone and they have three children: Perrine, Eugenie and Pierre Philippe.

== Selected works ==
- Passions of the Soul (2010)
- Creation (2010)
- Llama (2010)
- Video art Installation (2010)
- Drops of Blood Installation (2010)
- Live Soul Installation (2010)
- Blue Water (2008)
- Dawn (2008)
- Sun of Righteousness (2008)
- All eyes on you (2011) Mixed media installation – 160x60 cm
- Walking on Eggshells (2011) Mixed media installation – 200 aluminum cubes and 300 stainless steel eggs - Dimensions variable
- Self-portrait I, II, III (2011) 3D scanning printed on translucent photographic paper – 76x121 cm
- See no evil, Hear no evil, Speak no evil (2011) 3D scanning printed on translucent photographic paper – 76x121 cm
- Vertigo (2011)Oil on linen – 180x108 cm
- Vertigo (2011) 200x120 cm – Oil on linen
