= Steven Falcone =

American neurologist and radiologist

Steven F. Falcone is an American neurologist and radiologist. He is an associate professor of radiology, neurological surgery, and ophthalmology at the Miller School of Medicine at the University of Miami and executive clinical dean at their Florida Atlantic University regional campus.

== Early life and education ==
Falcone earned his Bachelor of Science, medical, and Master of Business Administration degrees from the University of Miami. Following this, he completed his residency in radiology and a fellowship in neuroradiology at Jackson Memorial Hospital in Miami.

== Career ==
Falcone subsequently joined the faculty at the University of Miami in 1992.

In 2007, as an associate professor of radiology, neurological surgery and ophthalmology at the University of Miami, Falcone was appointed Executive Clinical Dean for the Regional Campus of the Miller School of Medicine at Florida Atlantic University in Boca Raton, Florida.

In 2010, Falcone was promoted to associate vice president for medical affairs and chief operating officer for the University of Miami Medical Group and associate executive dean for practice development. In his new position, Falcone was expected to spearhead the growth of UMMG while continuing to implement ofUChart, the electronic medical record system, and the establishment of a central billing office for UHealth – University of Miami Health System.

== Personal life ==
Falcone married Janet Sue Smith in July 1983.
