= Alex Falcone =

American comedian, writer, and actor (born 1984)

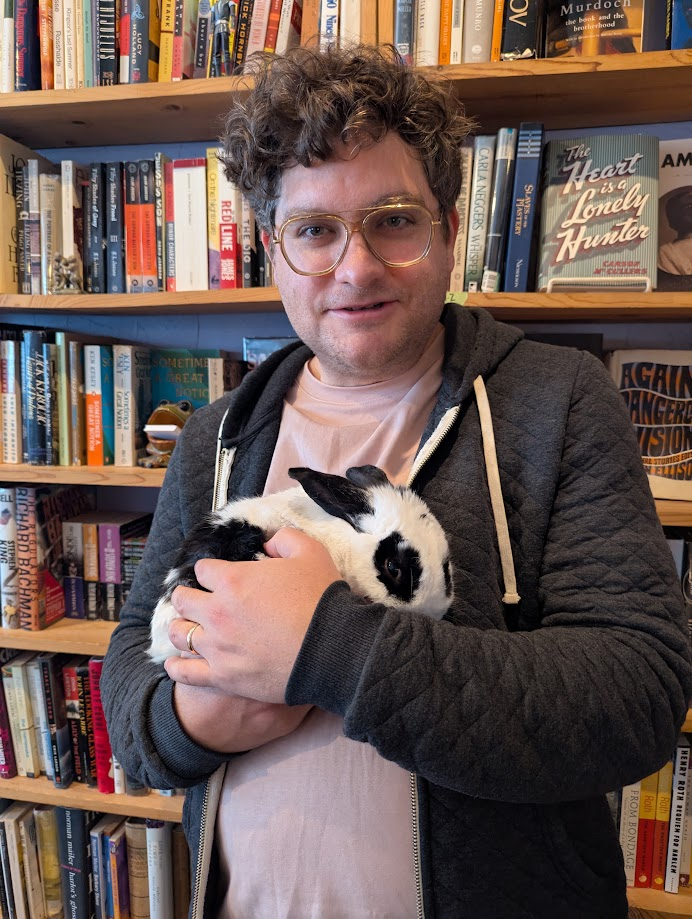
- Born: 1984 (age 41–42); Reno, Nevada, US
- Occupations: Comedian; Author; Podcaster
- Years active: 2007–present

Instagram information
- Page: Alex Falcone
- Followers: 1M

TikTok information
- Page: Alex Falcone
- Followers: 767K

Comedy career
- Medium: Stand-up; television
- Genres: Observational comedy; sarcasm; self-deprecation
- Last updated: 11 September 2026

Alex Falcone (born 1984) is an American comedian, writer, and actor. Among other ventures, he creates social media videos on scams.

== Early life and education ==
Falcone was born in 1984 grew up in Reno, Nevada, the son of journalists Kitty and Steve Falcone; he has two sisters. He went to Galena High School and graduated from TMCC High School in 2003. He was part of a sketch comedy group called TV You Can Heckle, and acted in a television commercial about teen pregnancy.

== Career ==
Falcone moved to Portland, Oregon where he performed stand-up, hosted a podcast, was a freelance writer for the Portland Mercury, and taught comedy workshops. He played bit parts in the television show Portlandia and performed in local car commercials. He was named Portland's Funniest Person in 2018 and called a "local powerhouse comic" by The Oregonian. A local ice cream shop, Salt & Straw, named a flavor after him: Chocolate and Falcognac.

Falcone was the creator of the comedy show Late Night Action, a comedy spoof of the late night talk show format. The show ended in 2016, and in 2019, he moved to Los Angeles. He appeared on The Late Show with Stephen Colbert in 2021.

Falcone's grandfather was a carnival pitchman selling "kitchen gadgets and magic tricks", which piqued Falcone's interest in schemes. His series of videos called "Is It a Scam? Yep." humorously discusses a wide variety of frauds and scams. He creates short explainer videos on topics such as how many competing brands on products (potato chips, soft drinks) are all owned by the same company. He has also written about scams for Time Magazine, discussed scams on the Yahoo Sports podcasts, and discussed how to find good coffee on the road as a guest columnist for the Washington Post. He is writing a book based on his internet videos about scams, broadening the definition of the term to include "any time you’re getting money from somebody using dishonesty."

He is the co-author, with Ezra Fox, of Unwrap My Heart, a young adult romance spoofing the paranormal romance genre.
