= Faulconer =

Faulconer is a surname. Notable people with the surname include:

- Adam Faulconer – fictional character in "The Starbuck Chronicles"
- Bruce Faulconer – American composer
- Kevin Faulconer – former mayor of San Diego

== See also ==
- Falconer (surname)
- Faulkner (surname)
- Falkner (disambiguation)
- Fawkner (disambiguation)
- Faulknor (disambiguation)
- The Starbuck Chronicles, where a fictional Faulconer County and Faulconer family are key plot elements
