= Faulknor =

Faulknor may refer to:

In people:

- Faulknor family, an English family of distinguished Royal Navy officers, including:
  - Jonathan Faulknor the elder
  - Robert Faulknor the younger (1763-1795)
- Christopher Faulknor (born 1962), Jamaican sprinter
- Kennedy Faulknor (born 1999), Canadian soccer player

In ships:

- Faulknor class leader, a class of British flotilla leaders named after the Faulknor family
- HMS Faulknor, two destroyers named after the Faulknor family

== See also ==
- Falconer (disambiguation)
- Falkner (disambiguation)
- Faulkner (disambiguation)
- Fawkner (disambiguation)
- Faulconer (surname)
