= Maria Smith-Falkner =

Soviet economist and statistician

Maria Natanovna Smith-Falkner (Russian: Мария Натановна Смит-Фалькнер; 16 February [O.S. 4 February] 1878, Taganrog – 7 March 1968, Moscow) was a Soviet economist, statistician and a corresponding member of the Academy of Sciences of the Soviet Union from 1939 onward. She was a member of the Communist Party of the Soviet Union, having joined the Mensheviks in 1918.

== Biography ==
She was born into the family of a Jewish merchant. In 1901 she went to London to study at the London School of Economics, returning to Russia in 1905. She then got involved with the 1905 revolution. She joined the Menshevik faction of the Russian Social Democratic Labour Party and was arrested four times. This included an occasion in December 1905, when she organised an illegal conference in Moscow of the trade union of textile workers. She was arrested with the entire delegation of the Saint Petersburg Soviet.

- 1918-19 – chief of the department of economic research at VSNH (All-Russian Council of National Economy). Member of the Coil Section of the VSNH.
- 1919 – served in the Red Army in the Southern Front in the course of the Russian Civil War.
- Since 1921 – taught at universities and colleges in Moscow (the Moscow State University, the Georgi Plekhanov Moscow Institute of National Economy, the Oil Institute and others).
- 1925 – earned her doctorate in economics.
- 1921-24 – professor at the faculty of social studies of Moscow State University
- 1924-30 – professor at Moscow Institute of National Economy.
- 1925-34 – full member scholar at the Communist Academy of the Central Executive Committee (Moscow).
- 1926-30 – member of Board of the Central Statistical Administration of the USSR.
- 1930-34 – professor at the International Lenin School.
- 1934-36 – professor at the Economic Research Institute attached to the Gosplan (the State Planning Committee).
- 1937 – editor of the State Socio-Economic Publishing House.
- 1938-41 – professor at Moscow Economic Planning Institute.
- 1941-44 – senior staff scientist at the Economics Institute of the Academy of Sciences of the Soviet Union.
- 1944-46 – senior staff scientist at the Institute of Foreign Trade.
- 1948-55 – team manager at the Economics Institute of the Academy of Sciences of the Soviet Union.

== Scientific interests ==
Smith-Falkner's research was focused on the issues of political economy of capitalism and socialism. Her scientific interests were: economics of capitalism and socialism, statistics theory, the status of the working class in the Western countries, etc. She conducted her research at the Institute of Economic Studies attached to the Gosplan (the State Planning Committee) and the Economic Institute of the Academy of Sciences of the Soviet Union.

Maria Smith-Falkner edited the works by David Ricardo and Sir William Petty to be published in the Soviet Union.

== Major works ==
- Prodovolstvennyi vopros v Anglii (The Food Question in England) St. Petersburg, 1917, The book was marked by Vladimir Lenin in the Book Chroncle (Knizhnaya letopis) journal
- Klassovaia borba v sovremennoi Anglii (Class Struggle in Modern England), Moscow, 1922
- Dinamika krizisov i polozhenie proletariata (The Moving Sources and Trends of Crises and the Status of Proletariat), Moscow, 1927
- Teoriia i praktika sovetskoi statistiki (The Theory and Practice of the Soviet Statistics) (Collected articles), Moscow, 1930
- Polozhenie rabochego klassa kapitalisticheskikh stran v svete teorii obnishchaniia Karla Marksa (The Status of the Working Class in the Capitalist Countries in the Light of Karl Marx's Impoverishment Theory) Moscow, 1933
- Polozhenie rabochego klassa v SShA, Anglii i Frantsii posle vtoroi mirovoi voiny (The Status of the Working Class in the USA, Great Britain and France after the WWII) Moscow, 1953
- Ocherki istorii burzhuaznoi politicheskoi ekonomii (The Studies on the History of the Bourgeois Political Economy. Mid 19th – Mid 20th century) Moscow, 1961

== Awards and honors ==
- Order of the Red Banner of Labour (10 June 1945)
- Order of the Badge of Honour (1953)
- Order of Lenin (1968)
