= Falkner Glacier =

Glacier in Antarctica

- Location within Antarctica
- Type: valley glacier
- Location: Victoria Land
- Coordinates: 73°45′S 166°01′E
- Length: 4 nautical miles (7 km; 5 mi)
- Thickness: unknown
- Terminus: Lady Newnes Bay
- Status: unknown

Falkner Glacier (73°45′S 166°01′E), is an east-flowing valley glacier, 4 nautical miles (7 km; 5 mi) long, located 2 nautical miles (4 km; 2 mi) south of Oakley Glacier in the Mountaineer Range, Victoria Land, Antarctica. The glacier descends steeply to Lady Newnes Bay where it forms a floating glacier tongue. It was named by the Advisory Committee on Antarctic Names (2008) after Kelly K. Falkner, Professor of Chemical Oceanography at Oregon State University, who served from 2006 as the first Program Director for the Antarctic Integrated System Science Program in the Division of Antarctic Sciences, Office of Antarctic Programs, National Science Foundation.

== See also ==
- List of glaciers in the Antarctic
- List of Antarctic ice streams
- Glaciology
