= Kelly Falkner =

American chemical oceanographer

- Born: March 1, 1960 (age 66)
- Education: Massachusetts Institute of Technology
- Scientific career
- Workplaces: National Science Foundation

Kelly Kenison Falkner (born March 1, 1960) is an American chemical oceanographer, educator and public servant. She served as the director of the National Science Foundation's (NSF's) Office of Polar Programs (OPP). Her work in the position led her NSF colleagues to name the Falkner Glacier, in Victoria Land, Antarctica, after her.

== Early life and education ==
Born in Lancaster, New Hampshire, Falkner received a B.A. in chemistry with a minor in Russian from Reed College in Oregon in 1983. She then earned her PhD in chemical oceanography from the Massachusetts Institute of Technology/Woods Hole Oceanographic Institution joint doctoral program in 1989.

== Career and impact ==
Prior to joining the NSF as deputy head of OPP on 3 January 2011, Falkner was a professor at Oregon State University's College of Earth, Oceanic and Atmospheric Sciences from 1992 to 2011. She taught and conducted research using state-of-the-art chemical measurements to investigate a wide array of environmental topics. Falkner's research as a sea-going oceanographer for 30 years took her all over the world from two miles below the sea surface, to Lake Baikal, the Greenland Ice Cap, the Black Sea and the world's oceans. She has 20 years of leading field research in the Arctic including over a decade of being a member of the North Pole Environmental Observatory as well as chief scientist on multiple Arctic icebreaking and aircraft-based expeditions.

During 2007–2009, Falkner was the founding program director of the Antarctic Integrated System Science in the Antarctic Science Division of the National Science Foundation Office of Polar Programs. In 2011, Falkner joined the National Science Foundation permanently, as the deputy head of Polar Programs, which manages the NSF's funding for research and support in the polar regions. She became director of NSF's Office of Polar Programs (OPP) effective 1 April 2012 subsequent to the retirement of Dr. Karl A. Erb. Dr. Falkner transitioned from her position as director to a detail as a foreign affairs officer for the Office of Science and Technology at the U.S.. Department of State in 2021 and then retired from federal service on January 1, 2023.

== Awards and honours ==
Her success in the position led her National Science Foundation colleagues to name the Falkner Glacier, in Victoria Land, Antarctica, after her. She has also been awarded the National Science Foundation Arctic Service Award (2000), and received a Presidential Rank Award for Meritorious Service (2018). In 2019, Falkner was named a fellow of the American Association for the Advancement of Science. In 2022, she was appointed professor emerita in the College of Earth, Ocean and Atmospheric Sciences at Oregon State University.
