= Ernest Morrell =

American academic (1971–2026)

Ernest Morrell (April 27, 1971 – February 4, 2026) was an American academic of both English and Africana Studies. In 2024, he was the Coyle Professor in Literacy Education at Notre Dame, the Director of the Notre Dame Center for Literacy Education and the Associate Dean for the Humanities and Equity in the College of Arts and Letters.

Morrell was also the founder and president of Desert Highway Music which produced blues and folk music with the intention of keeping American art forms alive. His scholarship focused on multicultural education and using hip-hop lyrics to teach literary texts.

== Education ==
Morrell earned a Bachelor of Arts degree in English at the University of California, Santa Barbara in 1993. He then earned his California teaching credential in Secondary English in 1994, a Master of Arts degree in education in 1997, and Ph.D. in language, Literacy and Culture in 2001, all from the University of California, Berkeley.

== Professional career ==
Morrell began his teaching career as an English teacher at Oakland High School in Oakland, California in 1994. While continuing to teach at Oakland High School, Morrell served as an instructor at the University of California Berkeley and supervised student teachers for the University of San Francisco.

Beginning 1999, he served as a research associate at Center X and an adjunct faculty member in the Graduate School of Education at the University of California, Los Angeles. Morrell was then an assistant professor in the Department of Teacher Education and an affiliated faculty member of the African-American and African Studies and Writing, Rhetoric and American Cultures departments at Michigan State University from 2001 to 2005. From 2002 to 2004, Morrell continued as a visiting assistant professor at UCLA. In 2005, Morrell became a tenure-track assistant professor. In 2007, Morrell earned tenure and became an associate professor at UCLA.

In 2011, Morrell became the Macy Professor of English Education and Director of the Institute for Urban and Minority Education (IUME) at Teachers College, Columbia University, succeeding Edmund Gordon in that role. During this time, from 2013 to 2014, Morrell served as president of the National Council of Teachers of English.

Morrell then transitioned to the University of Notre Dame in 2017, where he became the Associate Dean for the Humanities and Equity in the College of Arts and Letters. He was concurrently the Coyle Professor in Literacy Education, taught English and Africana Studies, and was director of the Notre Dame Center for Literacy Education.

He was also an elected member of the American Educational Research Association Council, elected Fellow of the American Educational Research Association, an appointed member of the International Literacy Association's Research Panel, and convener of the African Diaspora International Research Network.

== Personal life and death ==
Morrell resided in South Bend with his wife, Jodene Morrell, and three sons. He died from cancer on February 4, 2026, at the age of 54.

== Scholarship and publications ==
Morrell's scholarship focuses on multicultural education and how to provide youth the skills they need to succeed academically and function more powerfully as citizens in a multicultural democracy. A 2003 front-page story in the Los Angeles Times described how "Education professors Ernest Morrell and Jeffrey Duncan-Andrade use hip-hop lyrics to deepen students' understanding of established literary texts."

Morrell was the author of several books, including:

- Becoming Critical Researchers: Literacy and Empowerment for Urban Youth (2004)
- Linking Literacy and Popular Culture: Finding Connections for Lifelong Learning (2004)
- Critical Literacy and Urban Youth: Pedagogies of Access, Dissent, and Liberation (2008)
- The Art of Critical Pedagogies: Possibilities for Moving from Theory to Practice in Urban Schools (2008)
- Critical Pedagogy and Cultural Studies in Urban Education (2011)
- Powerful Teaching (2019)
- Freire and Children's Literature (with Jodene Morrell) (2023)

He has also contributed to several of the My Perspective education books series.

== Awards and recognitions ==
- 1999 – Certificate of Recognition for commitment to Oakland High School from the California State Senate
- 2001 – Outstanding Dissertation Award from the University of California, Berkeley
- 2001–2004 – American Educational Research Association/OERI postdoctoral fellowship
- 2005 – Academic Keys Who's Who in Education
- 2008 – Distinguished Teaching Award at University of California, Los Angeles
- 2009 – Featured in the UCLA Prime Magazine in an article titled, "7 Bruins Who Will Change the World."
- 2026 – President's Award given posthumously by University of Notre Dame President Robert A. Dowd
