= John Fawkner College =

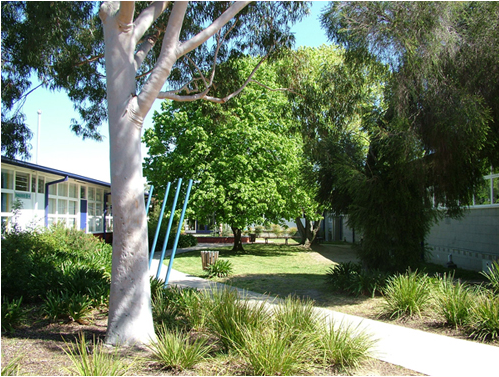
- The College's administration courtyard

Location
- Fawkner, Melbourne, Victoria; Australia; 37°42′12″S 144°58′17″E

Information
- Former name: Fawkner Secondary College
- Type: Government-funded co-educational secondary day school
- Established: 1956; 70 years ago
- Principal: Mark Natoli
- Years: 7–12
- Enrollment: c. 400
- Website: www.jfc.vic.edu.au

John Fawkner College (formerly Fawkner Secondary College) is a government-funded co-educational secondary day school, located in Fawkner, Melbourne, Victoria, Australia. As of 2009 the school had approximately 400 students from Year 7 to Year 12.

== Overview ==
Opened in 1956, John Fawkner College is recognised for its innovative approaches to teaching and learning achieving recognition in 2009 for all of the previous year's VCE graduates successfully engaged in further education, training or work. The school emphasises building character and enables students to discuss the full range of opportunities and pathways before undertaking studies in VCE, VCAL or VET leading to university, vocational education or trade based apprenticeships and training.

In 2008 the college received $1.1 million in funding from the State Government, Moreland City Council (now City of Merri-bek) and the Department of Education for upgrading its soccer facilities with a new FIFA-accredited synthetic soccer pitch. Soccer is popular in the school with all students having the opportunity to join the school Soccer Academy.

In 2009 John Fawkner College was granted $3 million alongside Box Forest College to change and better the school's image. The changes include a new name, a new logo, new uniform and a large complex that will contain six new classes with state-of-the-art technology.

== See also ==
- List of high schools in Victoria
