= Grand Falconer =

Grand Falconer may refer to:

- Grand Falconer of France
- Hereditary Grand Falconer of England, title of the Duke of St Albans

== See also ==
- Falconry
