= Falconer School =

Coordinates: 51.64700°N 0.36817°W

Location
- Falconer Road; Bushey, Hertfordshire, WD23 3AT; England

Information
- Type: Community special school
- Motto: 'Achieving the extraordinary together'
- Established: 1988
- Local authority: Hertfordshire
- Department for Education URN: 117686 Tables
- Ofsted: Reports
- Headteacher: Carmel Fox
- Gender: Boys
- Age: 11 to 16
- Enrolment: 85
- Houses: Peregrine, Merlin, Kestrel
- Colours: Black (Primary), Blue/Purple (Secondary)
- Website: http://www.falconer.herts.sch.uk/ Falconer School's website

Falconer School is a secondary school catering to students with special needs (primarily learning disabilities or those diagnosed with social, emotional and mental health - SEMH difficulties). Falconer is situated in Hertfordshire and provides day education for pupils that attend. The school was founded in 1974, in Bushey, Hertfordshire.

== Education ==
Falconer provides students with a range of qualifications up to GCSE-level, through a mix of both academic and vocational work. Each student has a personal say on the qualification subjects that they participate in. As of present, Falconer school offers a total of 25 qualifications which are available to students:

- English Literature
- English Language
- English (mixed)
- Mathematics (both foundation and higher)
- Science (only 'single' science is currently available at Falconer School, while changes are being made to ensure that they are able to provide students with further qualifications in science if the student needs require so)
- Art
- Music (Arts Award & Full GCSE)
- Design & Technology (Resistant Materials)
- ICT
- History
- Physical Education Foundation Qualification
- Religious Education
- Horticulture Qualification
- Construction Qualification

(Details needed on exact detailing of courses)

== Boarding ==
Residential facilities are no longer available.
