= Paul-Loup Sulitzer =

French financier and author (1946–2025)

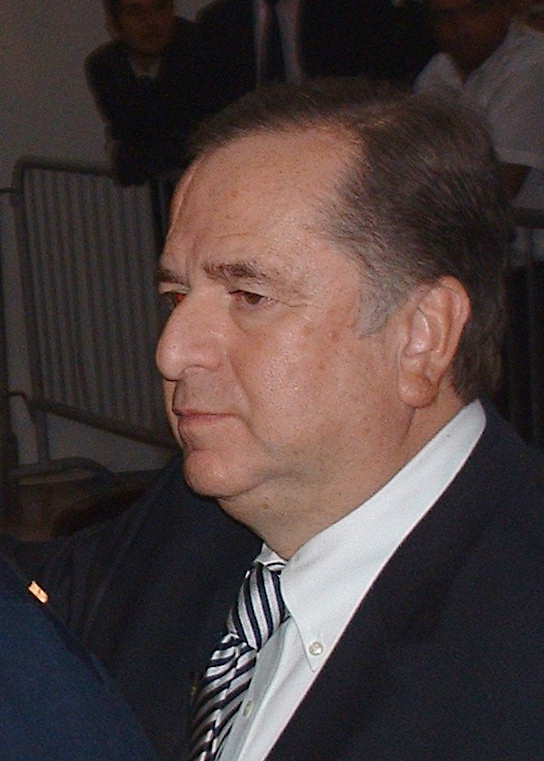
Sulitzer in 2008

Paul Loup Karl Sulitzer (22 July 1946 – 6 February 2025) was a French financier and author. Before he turned seventeen, he was already a self-made millionaire. Sulitzer used his financial experience and knowledge in his books, which often related to the business world.

Many of his books were ghost-written by Loup Durand.

== Life and career ==
Sulitzer's father was a Jewish immigrant from Romania who died when Sulitzer was 10. Six years later Sulitzer joined a trading company that operated in the Middle East. According to his editor, he became the youngest CEO in France at age 21 and made his fortune selling gadgets (notably keychains that were very popular between the years 1960 and 1970) in the UK that he imported from the Far East. In 1968 he incorporated a holding company and established a financial consultant firm.

In 1980, Sulitzer pitched a literary genre concept he called “finance Western” to Denoël Publishers that would be a series of finance-fiction adventure novels. Loup Durand, a journalist and writer, did the writing. The book Money reached a large audience. This was followed by Cash! (1981) and Fortune (1982) which depicted the exploits and financial dreams of Franz Cimballi, a vigilante businessman.

After these thrillers of a new genre, the duo published Le Roi Vert (1983). It was a romantic saga that achieved considerable public success and was translated into 30 languages.

At the end of the 1980s, he was a lecturer, with François Spoerry, Jean-Pierre Thiollet and others, to an international meeting in Geneva of Amiic (World Real Estate Investment Organization).

In 2000, he was arrested, along with the son of the former socialist president François Mitterrand, for the illegal sale of weapons to Angola.

Sulitzer died from a stroke on 6 February 2025, at the age of 78.

== Bibliography ==
=== Novels ===
- Les Riches Tome II
- La Femme d'Affaires
- Le Regime Sulitzer
- Laissez-nous Réussir
- Money (1983)
- Cash (1983)
- Le Roi Vert (English: The Green King) (1984)
- Fortune (1984)
- Le Barman du Waldorf (1986)
- Hannah (1987)
- L'Impératrice (Hannah Tome II) (1988)
- La Femme Pressée (1989)
- Kate (1990)
- Popov (1990)
- Les Routes de Pékin (1991)
- Cartel (1992)
- Tantzor (1993)
- Les riches Tome I (1993)
- Berlin (1994)
- L'Enfant des Sept Mers (1995)
- Soleils Rouges (1996)
- Tête de Diable (1997)
- Les Maîtres de la Vie (1999)
- Le Mercenaire du Diable (1999)
- Le Complot des Anges (1999)
- La Confession de Dina Winter (1999)
- Dans le Cercle Sacré (2001)
- Oriane Ou la Cinquième Couleur (2002)
- La Vengeance d'Esther (2003)
- Le Président (2004)

=== Comics ===
During the early nineties, three of his novels were adapted into comics. The adaptions, in 12 volumes, were written by Jean Annestay, drawn by multiple artists and published between 1991 and 1995 by Belgian comics publisher Dupuis.

The Green King was adapted into a comic series from 1991 to 1995. The artist on the first issue, Jacques Armand, died 17 April 1991, before it was completed. His friends, Alexandre Coutelis, Christian Rossi and Gilles Mezzomo helped complete the album.

- Le Roi Vert – Le Traque (English: The Green King – The Revenge) (by Armand and Annestay) (1991)
- Le Roi Vert – Guaharibos (English: The Green King – Guaharibos) (by Mezzomo and Annestay) (1993)
- Le Roi Vert – Les Chiens Noirs (English: The Green King – The Black Dogs) (by Mezzomo and Annestay) (1994)
- Le Roi Vert – Charmian Page (English: The Green King – Charmian Page) (by Mezzomo and Annestay) (1994)
- Le Roi Vert – Le Royaume (English: The Green King – The Kingdom) (by Mezzomo and Annestay) (1995)

Rourke was adapted into a comic series from 1991 to 1994.

- 01 – "La Mort Est Toujours Bonne" by Marvano
- 02 – "Le Bon Dieu Ne Dort Jamaims" by Marvano and Rouffa
- 03 – "Le Trois Concubine" by Marvano et Rouffa
- 04 – "Tigre d'Avril" by Marvano et Rouffa

Hannah was adapted in three volumes from 1991 to 1993, drawn by Franz Drappier.

== Honors and awards ==
- 1981: Prize for the Book of the Summer for Cash! (Denoël, 1981)
- 1987: Medal of Vermeil of the City of Paris
- 1987: Knight of the National Order of Merit (later excluded by a decree published in the official journal on 28 November 2012)
- 1996: Officier de l'Ordre national du Mérite (later excluded by a decree published in the official journal on 28 November 2012)
- Knight of Cahors
- Citizen of Honor of the Liège

== Legal affairs ==
In October 2008 the Angolagate trial commenced in Paris, in which Sulitzer was indicted. By the decision of the Correctional Tribunal he was condemned for "misuse of corporate assets" and given 15 months in prison with a fine of 100,000 euros. This conviction led to his exclusion from the National Order of Merit in November 2012. In 2009 he published Angolagate, the chronicle of a state scandal, which had been written day by day during the process, from October 2008 to March 2009.
