= Cima Falkner =

Mountain in Italy

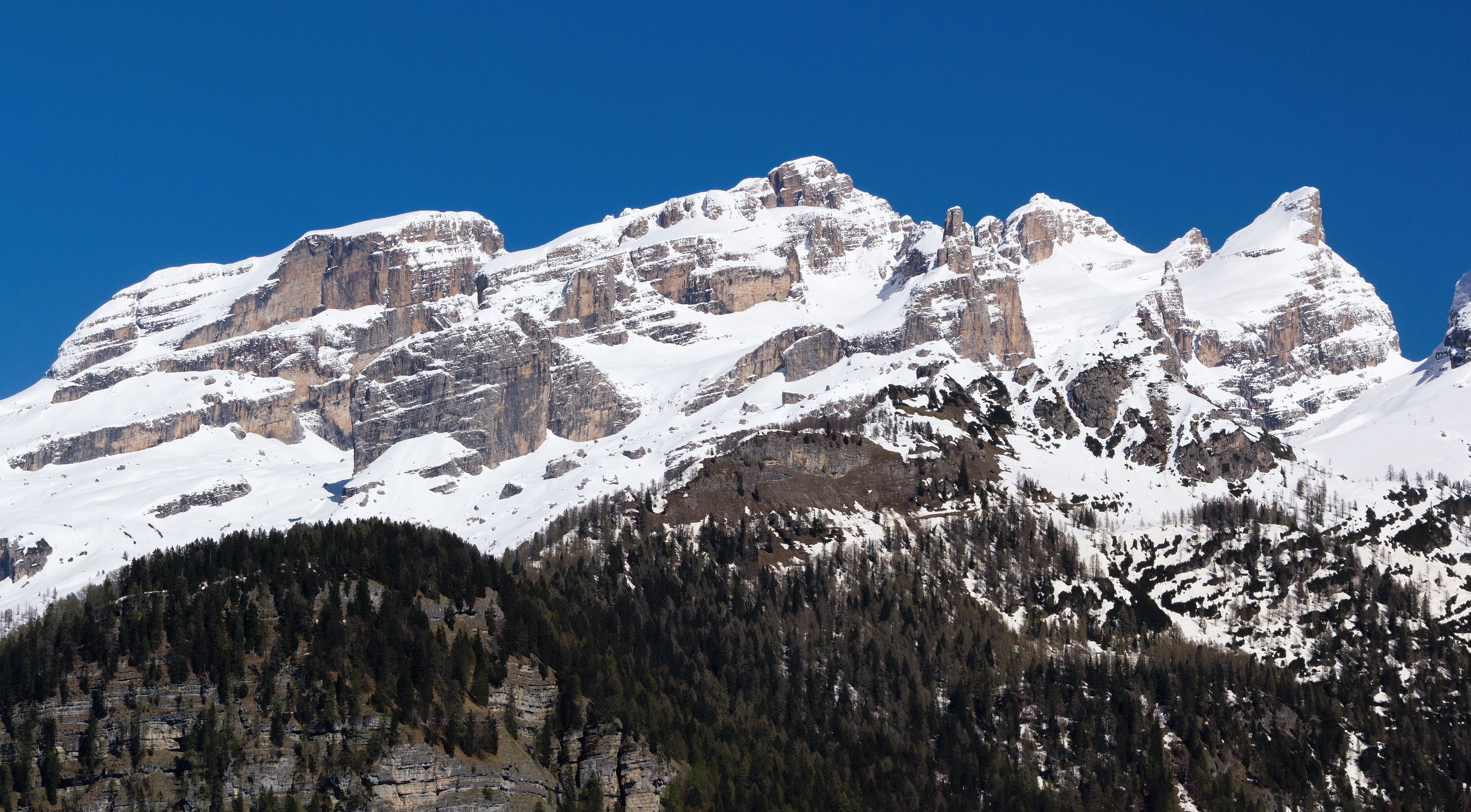
- West aspect

Highest point
- Elevation: 2,994 m (9,823 ft)
- Prominence: 348 m (1,142 ft)
- Parent peak: Cima Brenta
- Isolation: 1.584 km (0.984 mi)
- Coordinates: 46°11′36″N 10°54′18″E

Naming
- Etymology: Alberto de Falkner

Geography
- Location within Italy
- Interactive map of Cima Falkner
- Country: Italy
- Province: Trentino
- Protected area: Adamello Brenta Natural Park
- Parent range: Rhaetian Alps; Brenta group
- Topo map: Tabacco 053 Dolomiti di Brenta

Geology
- Rock age: Triassic
- Rock type: Dolomite

Climbing
- First ascent: 1882

Cima Falkner is a mountain in the province Trentino in northern Italy.

== Description ==
Cima Falkner is a 2,994-meter-elevation (9,823-foot) summit in the Brenta group of the Rhaetian Alps. It is within Adamello Brenta Natural Park and a World Heritage Site. Set in the Trentino-Alto Adige/Südtirol region, the peak is located seven kilometers (4.35 miles) southeast of the village of Madonna di Campiglio, and 20 kilometers (12.4 miles) northwest of the municipality of Trento. Precipitation runoff from the mountain's west slope drains into a tributary of the Sarca, whereas the east slope drains to Lago di Tovel which is within the Adige drainage basin. Topographic relief is significant as the summit rises 1,400 meters (4,593 feet) above the Vallesinella (valley) in three kilometers (1.86 miles). The nearest higher neighbor is Cima Brenta, 1.6 kilometers (1 mile) to the south-southwest.

== History ==
The mountain's toponym honors Alberto de Falkner who made the first ascent of the summit in 1882 with Antonio Dallagiacoma via the southeast gully and the south-southeast side. The second ascent was made on July 17, 1883, by Edward Theodore Compton, Antonio Dallagiacoma, Alberto de Falkner, and Matteo Nicolussi via the south-southwest side. The east wall was first climbed on July 19, 1894, by Carlo Garbari (solo).

On August 1, 2025, a series of rockslides collapsed from the peak, releasing 500,000 m^{3} of rock equivalent to approximately a thousand Olympic-size swimming pools causing the evacuation of hundreds of hikers, and closing several trails. Experts blame the accelerating increase of landslides in the area on thawing permafrost caused by climate change.

== Climate ==
Based on the Köppen climate classification, Cima Falkner is located in an alpine climate zone with long, cold winters, and short, mild summers. Weather systems are forced upwards by the mountains (orographic lift), causing moisture to drop in the form of rain and snow. The months of June through September offer the most favorable weather for visiting or climbing in this area.

== Gallery ==
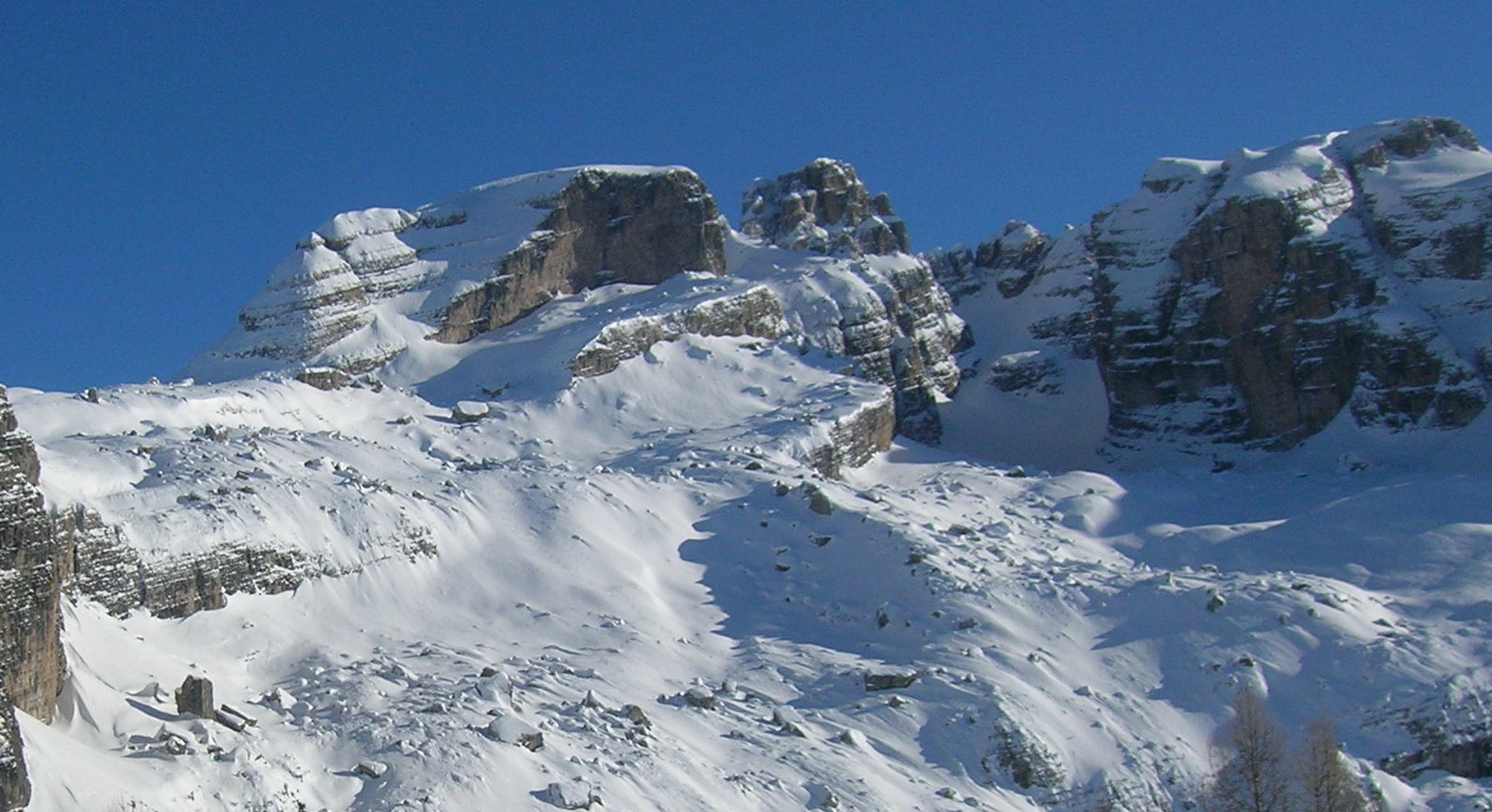
Summit of Cima Falkner centered in back with Cima Grostè to left

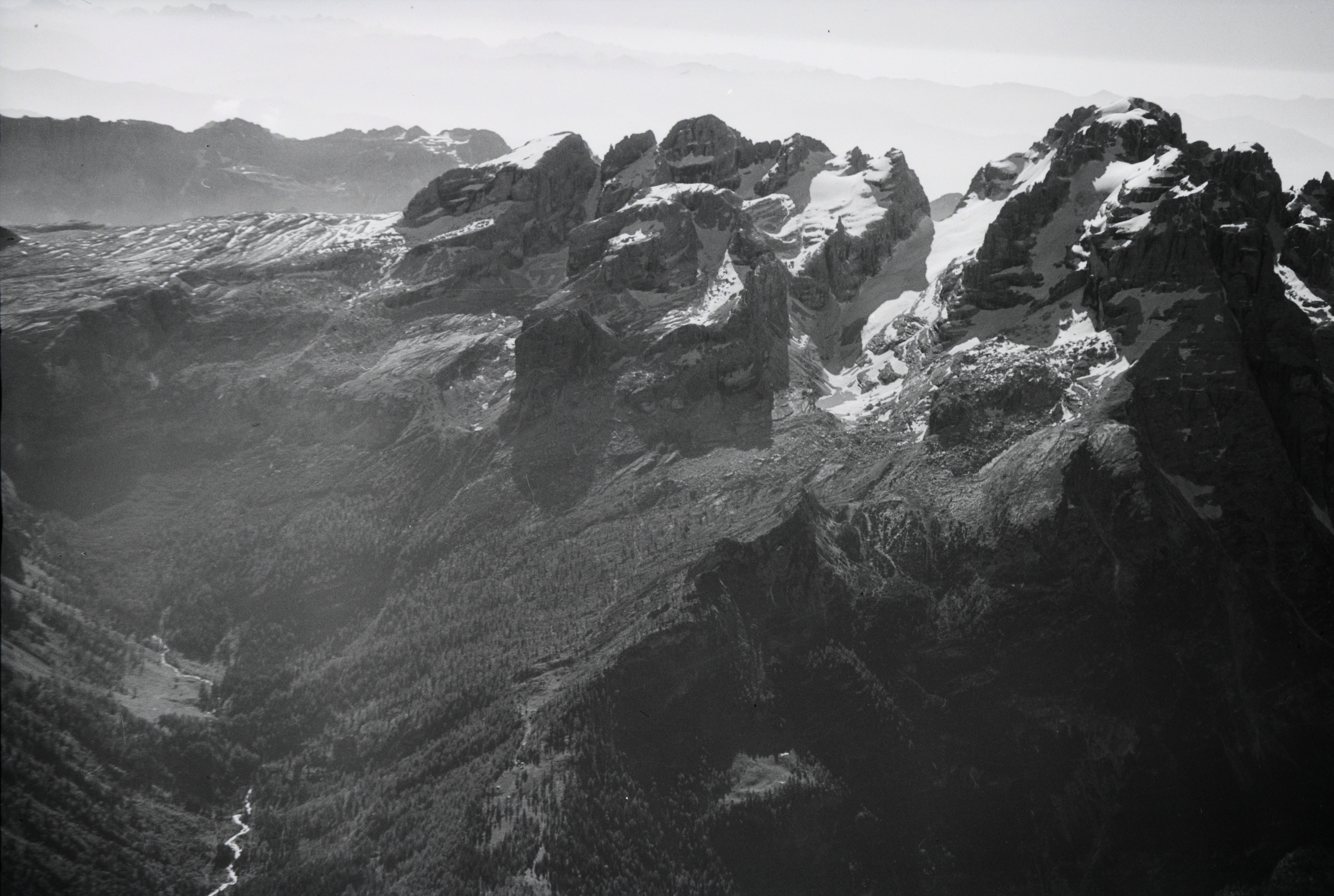
Cima Falkner centered with Cima Brenta to right

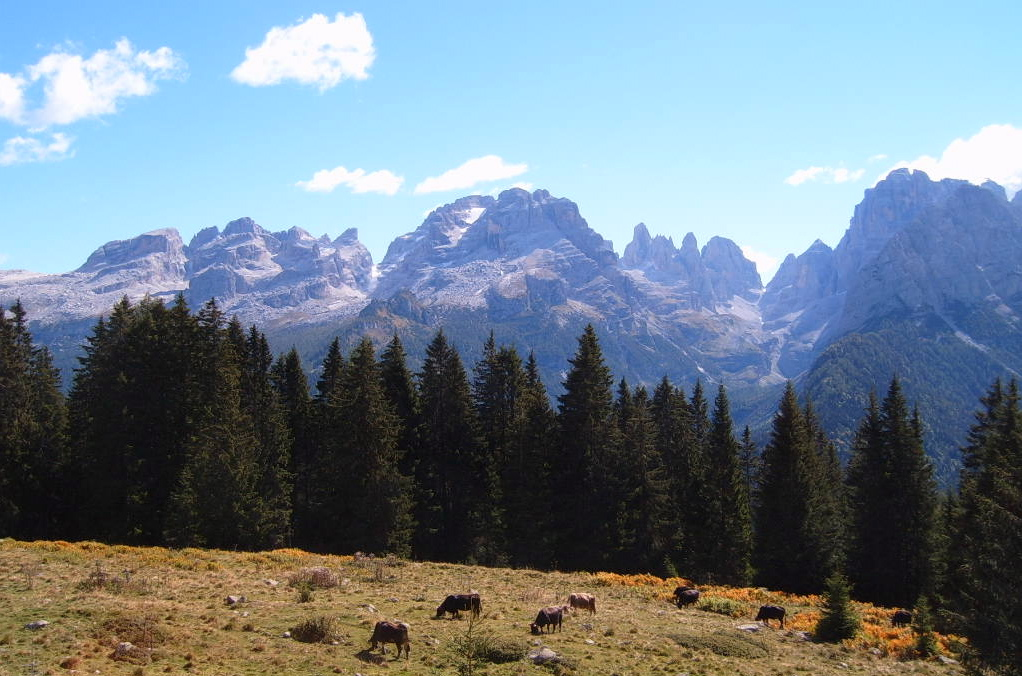
Brenta Group with Cima Falkner to left

== See also ==
- Alps
