= William Faulkner (disambiguation) =

William Faulkner was an American novelist.

William Faulkner may also refer to:

- William M. Faulkner, United States Marine Corps lieutenant general
- William Faulkner (cricketer) (born 1923), English first-class cricketer
- William Faulkner (soccer), Australian international soccer player

== See also ==
- William Falconer (disambiguation)
- Faulkner (surname)
- William Faulkner Foundation
- William Faulkner House, Oxford, Lafayette County, Mississippi
- William Faulkner – William Wisdom Creative Writing Competition
