= Thomas Falconer (classical scholar, born 1772) =

English clergyman and classical scholar (1772–1839)

Thomas Falconer (1772–1839) was an English clergyman and classical scholar.

== Life ==
The son of William Falconer, M.D., F.R.S., of Bath, Somerset by Henrietta, daughter of Thomas Edmunds of Worsborough Hall, Yorkshire, he was born on 24 December 1772, and educated at the cathedral school, Chester, the grammar school in Bath, the high school, Manchester, The King's School, Chester, and Corpus Christi College, Oxford. He was a precocious boy, and some of his verses were published in ‘Prolusiones Poeticæ,’ Chester, 1788. The same year he was elected to a scholarship at Corpus Christi, where he graduated B.A. in 1791, and took the M.A. degree and a fellowship in 1795.

After taking holy orders he spent some years at Edinburgh studying medicine. He took his M.B. and M.D. degrees at Oxford in 1822. He never practised medicine, nor, except for a short time as locum tenens, did he do any ordinary clerical duty. He was, however, select preacher before the university of Oxford on several occasions, and he was Bampton lecturer in 1810.

He died at Bath on 19 February 1839. Falconer married Frances, daughter of Lieutenant-colonel Robert Raitt, by whom he had issue, besides one son and three daughters who died in his lifetime, four sons who survived him, viz. Thomas Falconer, William Falconer, Alexander Pytts Falconer, and Randle Wilbraham Falconer.

== Works ==
Falconer published:

- The Voyage of Hanno, translated and accompanied with the Greek text and dissertations, Oxford, 1797.
- The Resurrection of our Saviour ascertained from an Examination of the Proofs of the Identity of His Character after that Event, Bath, 1798.
- The Tocsin; or an Appeal to Good Sense, by the Rev. L. Dutens, translator. London, 1798.
- Remarks on some Passages in Mr. Bryant's Publications respecting the War of Troy, London, 1799. Against Jacob Bryant.
- St. Luke's Preface to his Gospel examined with reference to Mr. Marsh's hypothesis respecting the origin of the three first Gospels, Bath, 1802.
- A Letter to the Rev. R. Warner respecting his Sermon on War, Oxford, 1804.
- Discourse on the Measure of the Olympic Stadium (joint work with his father, appended to the latter's translation of Arrian's Periplus), Oxford, 1805.
- Strabonis Rerum Geographicarum libri xvii., Græce et Latine, Oxford, 1807, fol. This work was based on materials left by his uncle, Thomas Falconer (1738–1792). The first two books had been seen through the press by John Parsons, and five more had been edited by Halliwell when, in 1802, Falconer undertook to complete it, which he did in 1807.
- Communication to Dr. Vincent on the Articles of Commerce mentioned in the Digest, inserted in the appendix to Vincent's edition of Arrian's Periplus, 1807.
- A Sermon preached before the University of Oxford, Oxford, 1810.
- Certain Principles in Evanson's "Dissonance of the four generally received Evangelists," &c. examined in eight discourses delivered before the University of Oxford at the lecture founded by the Rev. J. Bampton, Oxford, 1811. On Edward Evanson.
- Review of the French translation of Strabo (Quarterly Review May 1811).
- Two letters to the editor of the Gentleman's Magazine on the articles in the Edinburgh Review relating to the Oxford Strabo, July 1809 and April 1810 (Gent. Mag. 1809, pt. ii. 923, 1810, pt. ii. 227), published separately, Oxford, 1811.
- A Sermon upon the Folly and Criminality of attempts to Search into Futurity, Oxford, 1812.
- An Assize Sermon upon Oaths, their Nature, Obligations, and Influence, Oxford, 1813.
- Outlines of a Plan for Building twenty-five Churches and Chapels (in The Pamphleteer, vol. vi.), 1816.
- A Sermon upon the Temptation and Resurrection of our Lord, preached before the University of Oxford, Oxford, 1817.
- The Case of Eusebius examined, Oxford, 1818.
- A funeral sermon, Oxford, 1821.
- The Absurd Hypothesis that Eusebius of Cæsarea, Bishop and Historian, was an Editor or Corrupter of the Holy Scriptures; in a second part of the Case of Eusebius, Oxford, 1823.
- The Cottage Land Worker, Bath, 1830.

Falconer also contributed notes on the Psalms to Richard Warner's edition of the Book of Common Prayer. He left in manuscript a translation of Strabo (see William Falconer).
