= John Downie Falconer =

Scottish geologist and geographer

John Downie Falconer FRSE FGS FRGS (1876 – 1947) was a Scottish geologist and geographer linked to colonial Africa.

== Life ==
He was born in the village of Midlothian, on 1 November 1876, the son of John Falconer and Sophia Downie. He attended Glasgow University graduating MA in 1897 and receiving a doctorate (DSc) in 1906.

He then went to Edinburgh to act as Prof James Geikie's assistant, before accepting a role overseeing the official mineral survey of Nigeria in 1904. In 1911 he returned to his alma mater to lecture in Geography. In 1907 he was elected a Fellow of the Royal Society of Edinburgh. His proposers were James Geikie, John Horne, Ben Peach and Ramsay Heatley Traquair.

During the First World War he was requested by the Colonial Office to act as Assistant District Commissioner for Nigeria, a relatively high-level responsibility. In 1918 he stayed in Nigeria as Director of the Geological Survey of Nigeria, leaving in 1927 on completion of this large task. He subsequently became official Geologist to the Republic of Uruguay, 1928–1934.

His address in later life was 43 Fordhook Avenue in Ealing, in west London. He died in Hounslow in west London on 16 April 1947.

== Family ==
He married twice: in 1908 to Edith Burman (d.1934); and in 1941 to Catherine Elizabeth Hughes (d.1947), a Canadian. He had one son, John Geikie Falconer, and two daughters by his first wife. His daughter Dora Janet Burman Falconer (1911–2010) became a surgeon and served as a rare female doctor in the Royal Army Medical Corps during the Second World War in East Africa rising to Lt Colonel. She married Dr Richard Savage and worked with him in Nigeria.

== Publications ==
- The Igneous Geology of Bathgate and the Linlithgow Hills (1906)
- The Geology of Ardrossan (1907)
- The Geology and Geography of Northern Nigeria (1911)
- On Horseback Through Nigeria (1911)
- The Geology of the Plateau Tinfields of Nigeria (1921)
- The Gondwana System of North-Eastern Uruguay (1937)
- Darwin in Uruguay (1937)
