= John Ireland Falconer =

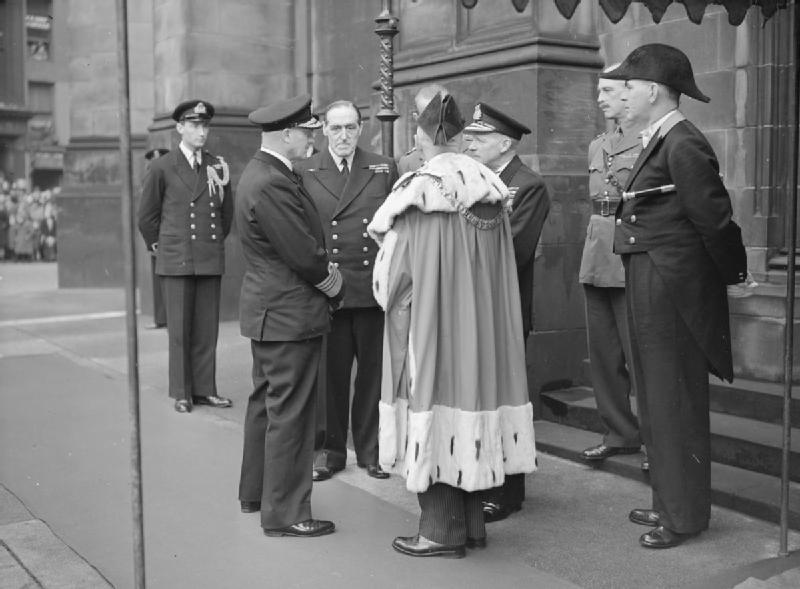
Lord Provost Falconer (back to camera, in robes) with dignitaries at St Giles's Cathedral, September 1945

Sir John Ireland Falconer, WS (30 November 1879 – 6 April 1954) was the Lord Provost of Edinburgh, Scotland from 1944 to 1947.

== Early life ==
John Ireland Falconer was born in 1879, in Fortrose, Ross-shire, in the Black Isle area of Scotland. His parents were the Rev. Charles Falconer, Church of Scotland, and his wife, Jane Ireland. His mother was the great-granddaughter of Charles Spalding, improver of the diving bell. The Falconers were close relatives of the Scottish lairds Smalls of Dirnanean, Perthshire, Scotland.

Falconer received his early education at the Fortrose Academy in his home town, later attending George Watson's College in Edinburgh. He received an M.A. and LL.B from the University of Edinburgh. After initially practising law in Glasgow, Falconer joined the Edinburgh firm of Fyfe, Ireland & Co., W.S., in 1911.

In Edinburgh on 16 October 1913, Falconer married Catherine Louise Mary Robinson, the daughter of John Norman Robinson of Bunkers Hill, Carlisle and Croftheads, Moffat.

On the outbreak of World War I, Falconer received a commission as lieutenant in 9th Royal Scots on 1 October 1914. He was promoted to captain and adjutant on 4 March 1915, and to major on 5 July 1916. He later joined the 13th Royal Scots. During his military career, Falconer served in England and Ireland (1914–18) and France (1918–19). In early 1919, after his discharge from military service, Falconer resumed the practise of law in Edinburgh.

== Civic career ==
Falconer began his civic career in 1932 with his election to the Town Council in Edinburgh. In 1935 he was elected Magistrate of the body, becoming its Treasurer in 1940. In 1938 he lost by one vote in an election to become the Progressive Party's candidate for Lord Provost of Edinburgh. During World War II he served as the Chief Air Raid Warden for Edinburgh, with the responsibility for raising the city's Civil Defence plans to war time efficiency. In 1944 Falconer was again put forward as the Progressive Party's candidate for Lord Provost, this time winning the position. On 10 November 1944 Falconer was sworn in as Lord Provost of Edinburgh.

In 1937 Falconer joined the University Court of the University of Edinburgh.

Between 1945 and 1947, Falconer played a major role in establishing the Edinburgh International Festival, putting in train the necessary administrative machinery that ensured that the Festival could take place. The first Festival occurred during his last year as Lord Provost.

For his civic service, Falconer was bestowed the honour of Knight Bachelor (Kt) in 1946. Falconer was knighted by King George VI during a royal visit to Edinburgh. The honour noted his "dignity, capacity, assiduity, and courtesy of manner has added not only to the lustre of the office he holds but to his own considerable record of achievement in the public service." Later in 1946 Falconer was conferred an honorary Doctorate of Law degree from the University of Edinburgh.

In 1952 Falconer was appointed chairman of the Scottish Advisory Council of the BBC.

== Personal life ==
Falconer and his wife were the parents of three children, two sons and a daughter. The couple were also the grandparents of Charles Falconer, Baron Falconer of Thoroton.

Catherine Robinson Falconer died on 12 August 1935. Sir John Ireland Falconer died on 6 April 1954.

Honorary titles
Preceded by Sir William Young Darling	Lord Provost of Edinburgh; 1944–1947	Succeeded by Sir Andrew Hunter Arbuthnot Murray
