= William Falconer (translator) =

English cleric and academic

William Falconer (1801–1885) was an English cleric and academic who was known as a translator of Strabo.

== Life ==
Falconer was the eldest son of the Reverend Thomas Falconer, by Frances, only child of Lieutenant-colonel Robert Raitt. He was born in Corston, Somersetshire, on 27 December 1801, and was baptised there on 21 July 1802. On 10 December 1819, he matriculated at Oriel College, Oxford, and having taken a third class in classics and a first class in mathematics graduated B.A. in 1823 and proceeded M.A. in 1827. He was elected a Petrean fellow of Exeter College, Oxford, on 30 June that year and was mathematical examiner in the university from 1832 to 1833 and again from 1836 to 1838. In 1839, he opened the Petrean fellowships at Exeter College to natives of Cheshire by conveying a small incorporeal hereditament to Lord Petre for that purpose.

His college presented him, on 26 January 1839, to the rectory of Bushey, Hertfordshire. He married in 1840 Isabella, daughter of J. Robinson, and widow of W. S. Douglas; she died at St. Alessi, near Pistoja in Tuscany, 7 February 1869. He died at Bushey rectory on 9 February 1885.

== Works ==
Falconer is known as one of the translators of The Geography of Strabo. It was literally translated, with notes. The first six books by Hans Claude Hamilton, and the remainder by Falconer, with a complete index, appeared in Bohn's Classical Library in 1854–57 in three volumes. The text of Strabo had been edited in 1807 by his father, Thomas Falconer, who had also prepared a translation, the manuscript of which was used by his son.
