= John Falconer (merchant) =

John Falconer (fl. 1547) was an English merchant and botanist.

== Biography ==
Falconer appears to have been the first Englishman who possessed a series of dried plants, a method of study first practised by Luca Ghini of Bologna, the originator of botanical gardens. Falconer travelled, and from 1540 or 1541 lived at Ferrara, which he left in 1547. He was a fellow-pupil of William Turner, the father of English botany, at Bologna, and is mentioned in Turner's Herbal several times. "Maister Falkonner's Boke" is an early mention of a herbarium.
