= John A. Falconer =

- Born: c. 1844; Washtenaw County, Michigan, US
- Died: April 1, 1900; Missouri, US
- Burial place: Sunset Hill Cemetery
- Military career
- Allegiance: United States of America
- Branch: United States Army
- Rank: Corporal
- Units: Company A, 17th Michigan Volunteer Infantry Regiment
- Conflicts: Siege of Knoxville
- Awards: Medal of Honor

Corporal John A. Falconer (c. 1844 – April 1, 1900) was an American soldier who fought in the American Civil War. Falconer received the United States' highest award for bravery during combat, the Medal of Honor, for his action during the siege of Knoxville at Fort Sanders in Tennessee on November 20, 1863. He was honored with the award on July 27, 1896.

== Biography ==
Falconer was born in Washtenaw County, Michigan, in about 1844. He enlisted into the 17th Michigan Infantry. He died on April 1, 1900, and his remains are interred at Sunset Hill Cemetery in Warrensburg, Missouri.

== Medal of Honor citation ==
Conducted the "burning party" of his regiment at the time a charge was made on the enemy's picket line, and burned the house which had sheltered the enemy's sharpshooters, thus insuring success to a hazardous enterprise.

== See also ==
- List of American Civil War Medal of Honor recipients: A–F
