= Colin Falconer (writer) =

Australian writer (born 1953)

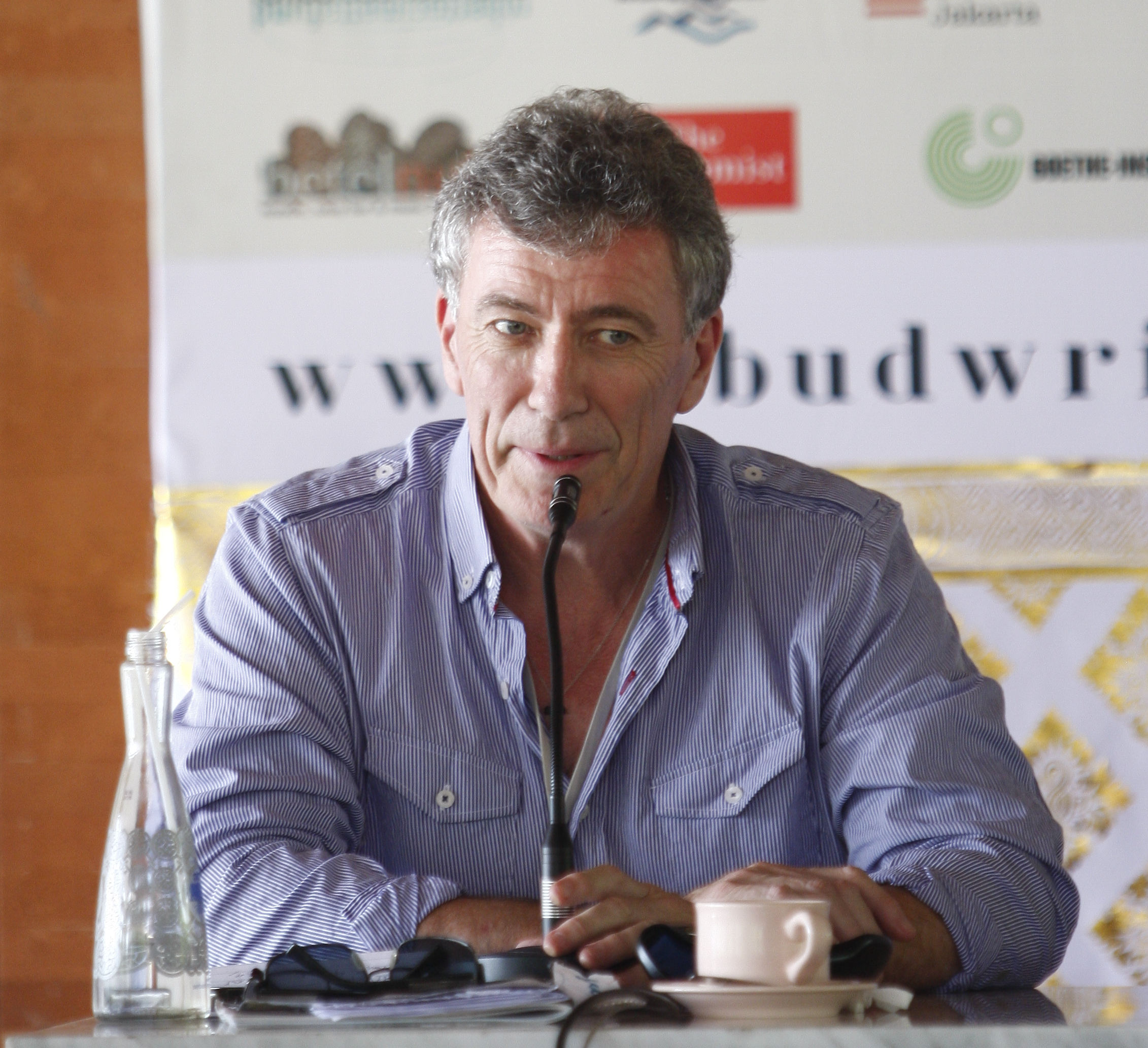
- Colin Falconer at Ubud Writers & Readers Festival 2012
- Born: Colin Bowles; 1953 (age 72–73); London, England
- Occupation: Writer
- Website: www.colinfalconerbooks.com

Colin Falconer (born 1953) is a pen name of Colin Bowles, who also uses the pen name Mark D'Abranville, an English-born Australian writer. Works published under the pen name include contemporary and historical thrillers, and children's books. Under his original name he has also published books of satirical fiction; non-fiction books about language; television and radio scripts; and many magazine articles and columns.

== Biography ==
Born in North London, Bowles moved to Australia in his twenties and worked as a taxi driver and guitarist before joining an advertising agency. In 1984 he moved to Sydney to pursue a career as a writer.

He worked as a freelance journalist for various major magazines and wrote scripts for radio and television before becoming a full-time novelist in 1990. His books have been translated into 17 languages. He lives in Australia with his wife.

== Awards ==
Awards for Falconer's writing
Year	Title	Award	Result	Ref.
2000	Rough Justice	Barry Award for Best British Crime Novel	Finalist	
2001	The Certainty of Doing Evil	Barry Award for Best British Crime Novel	Finalist	

== Novels by Colin Falconer ==
- Harem (1993)
- Aztec (1999)
- Feathered Serpent (2002)
- The Sultan's Harem (2004)
- Silk Road (2011)
- Anastasia (2012)
- Isabella: Braveheart of France (2013)
- East India (2014)
- Nights in the Sun
- Venom
- Deathwatch (1991)
- Fury Book 1: Live For Me (1993)
- Opium
- Triad
- Dangerous
- Disappeared
- Rough Justice
- The Certainty of Doing Evil
- When We Were Gods
- My Beautiful Spy
- Pearls
- Stairway to the Moon (sequel to Pearls)
- Surfing Mr. Petrovic
- Colossus
- Stigmata
- The Unkillable Kitty O'Kane (2017)
- Lord of the Atlas (2022)
- Fury Book 2: Sleeping with the Enemy (2022)
- Ends of the Earth (2023)

== Works by Colin Bowles ==
These include:

- Wit's Dictionary
- G'day, Teach Yourself Australian
- The Year We Seized the Day (2007, with Elizabeth Best)
- "Flying Blind"
- "Flying Hazzard"
