= John Mackie Falconer =

American painter

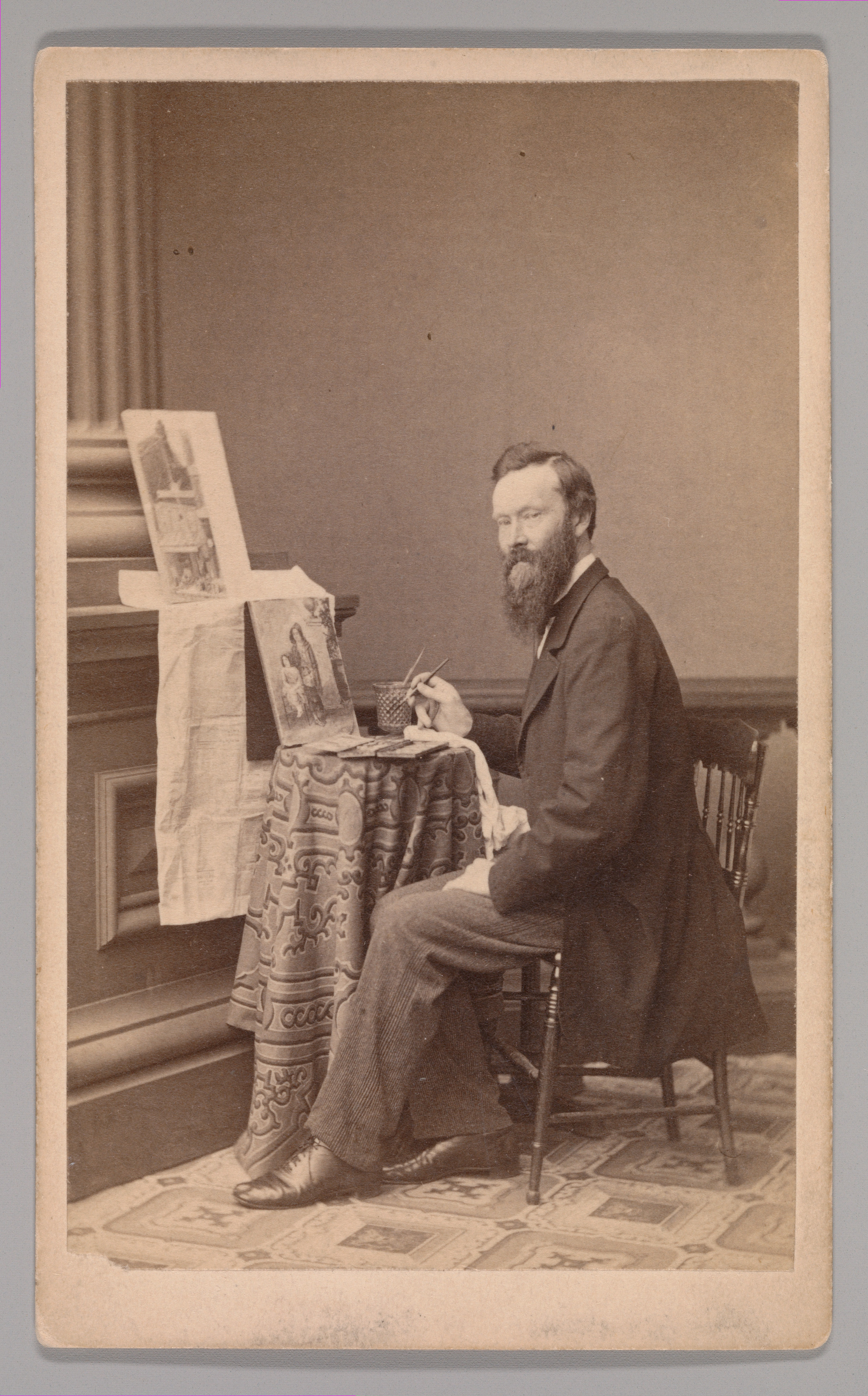
- Born: May 22, 1820; Edinburgh, Scotland
- Died: March 12, 1903 (aged 82); Brooklyn, New York
- Occupation: Artist

John Mackie Falconer (1820–1903) was a Scottish-born American etcher, painter, and watercolorist. Born in Edinburgh, he came to the United States in 1836.

== Biography ==
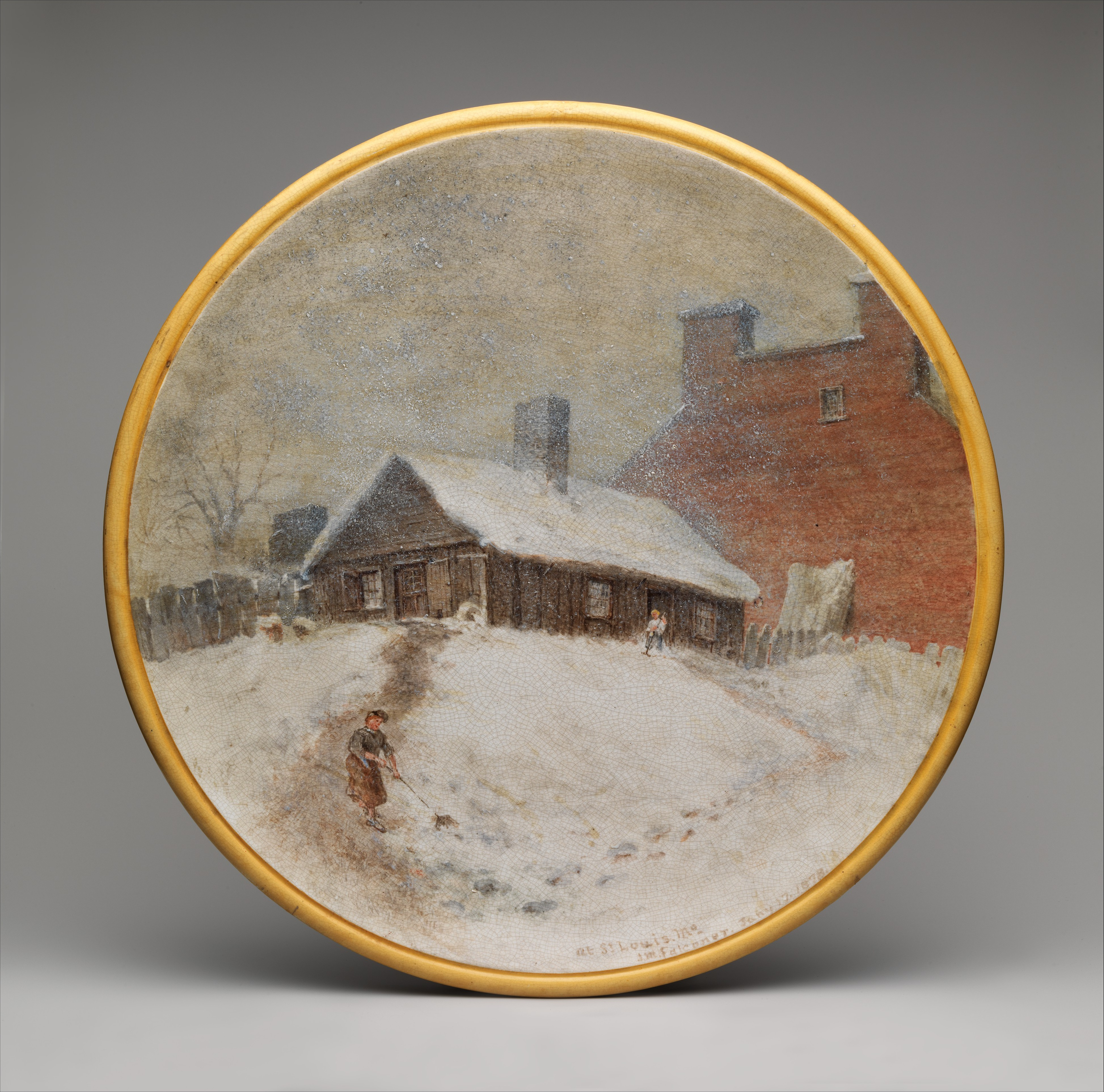

John Mackie Falconer was born in Edinburgh on May 22, 1820.

A full member of the New York Etching Club, he was made an honorary member of the National Academy of Design in 1856. He is known for studies of older buildings and ruins. Falconer was a friend of Thomas Cole, Asher Durand, Jasper Francis Cropsey and other artists of the Hudson River School.

He died at his home in Brooklyn on March 12, 1903.

His works are in the collections of the Metropolitan Museum of Art, New York; the Museum of Fine Arts, Boston; the New-York Historical Society; the Brooklyn Museum of Art; and the Columbus (Georgia) Museum.
