= Mario Falconi =

Italian priest

Father Mario Falconi was honoured for his humanitarian acts in defence of Tutsis during the genocide in eastern Rwanda (Muhura). He refused to leave Rwanda during the genocide and saved 3,000 people from being massacred.
