= Pierre Falcone =

French businessman (born 19 March 1954)

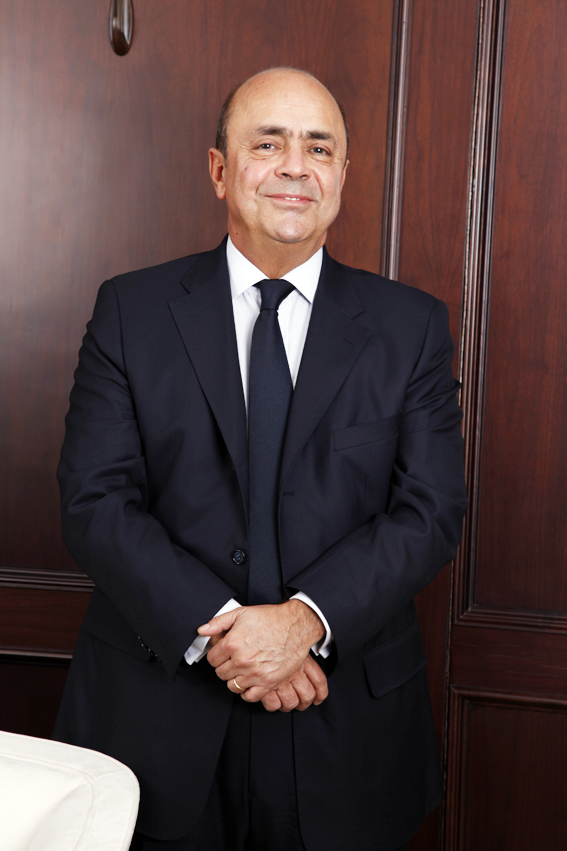
- Born: March 19, 1954 (age 72); Algiers
- Spouse: Sonia Falcone
- Children: 3

Pier‍re Falcone (born 19 March 1954 in Algiers) is a French serial entrepreneur and businessman. He is the Chairman of Pierson Capital Group.

== Early life ==
Falcone was born the son of Pierre Falcone senior in Algeria, who created Papa Falcone, a "fully integrated operation" in the fish industry in Algeria. Falcone and his parents moved to France when he was eight years old along with other French citizens when the country became independent in 1962.

Falcone studied law and economics at the University of Aix-en-Provence from 1973 to 1975.

== ‍Career‍ ==
Falcone moved to Brazil in 1977 at the age of 24; he soon started a business in trading agricultural products. He developed a wide portfolio of clients and partners throughout South America in the following years, which led him to represent several French and Chinese companies in countries such as Brazil and Mexico.

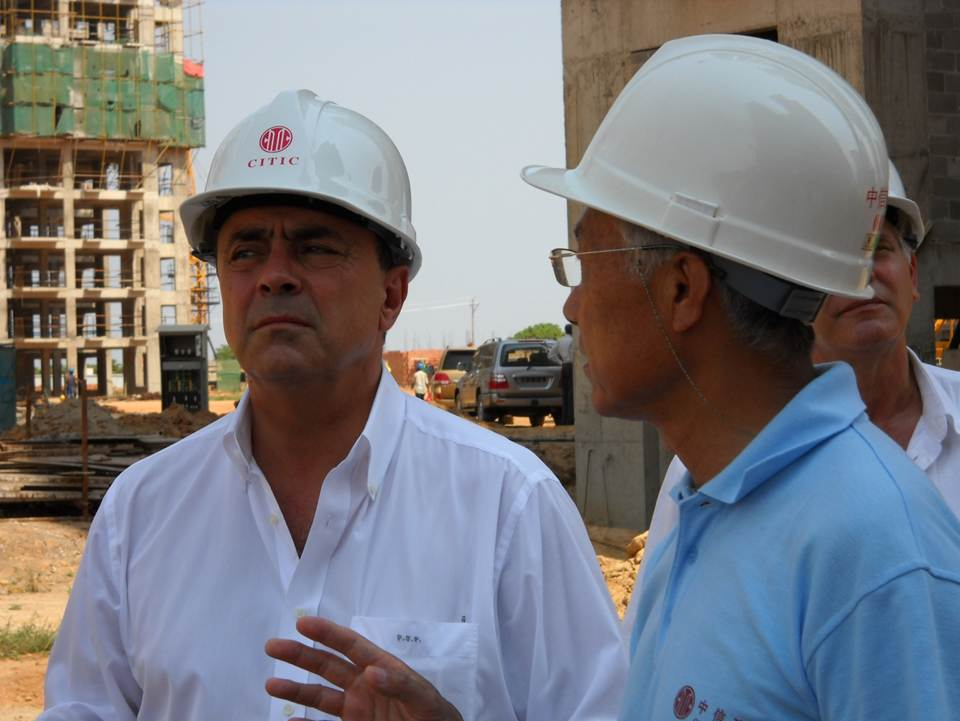
Pierre Falcone on site in Kilamba

Falcone moved in 1988 to China, where he later founded and headquartered his company Pierson Capital Asia.

He started his Chinese operations with consulting services for leading European companies looking to establish themselves in China. He negotiated the first insurance authorization granted by China to a Western company for French giant AXA as well as the involvement of Aerospatiale in the making of the first Chinese communication satellite.

In 1993, Falcone negotiated financing for the MPLA government of Angola during its civil war against UNITA. This financing was achieved in exchange for the future oil production of Angola for French interests. The subsequent delivery of weapons to support José Eduardo dos Santos's Angolan government led to a trial known as Angolagate in France.

In 2011, the charges against Falcone were dropped by an appeals court after he had served time in a French prison. The appeals court acknowledged that Falcone had been officially mandated by the Angolan government to acquire arms as well as food and medicine.

The company he heads, Pierson Capital Group, invests in hotels, real estate developments, agriculture and agroindustrial projects, oil, gas, and personal authentication systems. Pierson Capital Group has over 2600 employees and three main operations in Beijing, Luanda, and Mexico City.

== Private life ==
Pierre Falcone is married to former Miss Bolivia and artist Sonia Falcone. They have three children: Perrine, Eugenie and Pierre Philippe.

== H‍onours ==
On 17 June 2013, the Hebrew University of Jerusalem conferred him an honorary degree for supporting brain sciences.
