= John Falconer (Jesuit) =

English Jesuit

John Falconer or Falkner (1577–1656), was an English Jesuit.

== Early life ==
Falconer was the son of Henry Falconer by Martha Pike, his wife, was born at Lytton, Dorsetshire, on 25 March 1577. His mother belonged to a respectable Cheshire family, and his maternal uncle was Sir Richard Morton. His parents were Catholics, and both died while he was an infant. He was brought up by his uncle, John Brook, a merchant, until he was eleven years old, when he was sent to Sherborne School. Dorsetshire, for five years.

His brother then sent him to Oxford, where he studied for nearly a year in St. Mary's Hall, and for another year in Gloucester Hall. Subsequently, he joined the expedition of the Earl of Essex to Spain, and 'after being tossed about by many storms' he returned to London, where he spent two years and a half in the service of Lord Henry Windsor. In 1598 he was reconciled to the Catholic Church. Going to Rome he was admitted into the English College on 19 May 1600, under the assumed name of Dingley.

== Career ==
He was ordained priest 20 December 1603, entered the Society of Jesus 18 November 1604, and three years later was sent upon the English mission. His name occurs in a list of twelve Jesuits banished in 1618. He was professed of the four vows 22 July 1619. In 1621 he had returned from exile, and was exercising his spiritual functions in London. After serving as a missioner in the Oxford district, he was appointed socius to the master of novices at Watten in 1633, and subsequently confessor at Liège and Ghent. At one period he was penitentiary at St. Peter's, Rome. He was chaplain at Wardour Castle during its siege by Sir Edward Hungerford in 1643, took an active part in its gallant defence by Lady Blanche Arundel, and was employed in treating with the enemy for terms of honourable capitulation. He died on 7 July 1656.

== Works ==
His works are: 1. 'The Refutation of the Errors of John Thrusk,’ St. Omer, 1618, 4to, under the initials B. D. 2. 'Life of the Blessed Virgin Mary,’ St. Omer, 1632, 12mo, also under the initials B. D. 3. 'The Looking-glass of Conscience,’ St. Omer, 1632, 18mo, a translation under the initials I. F. 4. An English translation of ‘Fasciculus Myrrhæ de Passione Domini,’ St. Omer, 1632, under the initials I. F. 5. 'The admirable Life of St. Wenefride’ (St. Omer), 1635, 12mo, translated, under the initials I. F., from the Latin of Robert, prior of Shrewsbury. A reprint, for the use of pilgrims to the holy spring, appeared in 1712, 12mo, sine loco, under the title of 'The Life and Miracles of St. Wenefride, Virgin, Martyr, and Abbess, Patroness of Wales.' It is said in the preface to this edition that the translation was really made by John Flood, alias Alford, alias Griffith (cf. Oliver, Jesuit Collections, p. 43). 6. 'Life of St. Catharine of Sweden,’ St. Omer, 1635, 18mo, a translation under the initials I. F. 7. 'Life of St. Anne,’ manuscript.
