= Falcon (disambiguation) =

A falcon is a small to medium-sized bird of prey.

Falcon may also refer to:

== Arts and entertainment ==
=== Film and television ===
- Millennium Falcon, a fictional spaceship from the Star Wars films
- The Falcon (film), or Banović Strahinja, a 1981 Yugoslavian-German adventure film
- Falcón (TV series), a 2012 television series produced by Sky Atlantic and based on the Robert Wilson novels
- "Falcon" (Marvel Studios: Legends), an episode of Marvel Studios: Legends

=== Fictional characters ===
- Falcon (comics), a comic book superhero in the Marvel Universe
- Falcon (Marvel Cinematic Universe), the Marvel Cinematic Universe version
- The Falcon (fictional detective), the name of two detective characters created independently by Drexel Drake in 1936 and Michael Arlen in 1940, the second of which inspired a film series
- The Falcon (radio series), a radio drama featuring the detective created by Drexel Drake in 1936
- Falcon (G.I. Joe), a fictional character in the G.I. Joe universe
- Falcon, a locomotive character, later renamed Sir Handel, in The Railway Series by Rev. W. Awdry
- Falcon from Stuart Little 2
- Blue Falcon, a superhero in the American animated television series Dynomutt, Dog Wonder
- Captain Falcon, a racer in the F-Zero video game series
- Edward Falcon, in the Power Stone series of video games

=== Literature ===
- The Falcon, a literary magazine published by Commonwealth University-Mansfield (then Mansfield State College) from 1970 to 1980

=== Music ===
- DJ Falcon (born 1973), stage name of French house music DJ Stéphane Quême
- An operatic voice type first exemplified by Cornélie Falcon
- Falcon Records (disambiguation)
- The Falcon (band), a Chicago punk rock band
- Falcon (album), by British alternative rock band The Courteeners
- Falcon (singer) (born 1984), stage name of Amanda Lindsey Cook

=== Video games ===
- Falcon (series), a series of combat flight simulator computer games
  - Falcon (video game), the first game of the series
- Novint Falcon, a USB haptic controller designed to replace the mouse in video games and other applications
- Falcon, a motherboard formerly included in all Xbox 360 console models

== Businesses ==
- Bryggeri AB Falken, a Swedish brewery which sold beer under the name Falcon
- Falcon, Battersea, a public house (pub) in Battersea, London, England
- Falcon Entertainment, the parent corporation of a group of gay pornographic film studios
  - Falcon Studios, a large company producing gay pornography, based in San Francisco
- Falcon Pictures, an Indonesian house film production
- The Falcon, Camden, a public house in Camden, London, England
- The Falcon, Chester, a public house in Chester, England
- The Falcon, York, a public house in York, England

== Computing ==
- Atari Falcon, Atari's last released general-use computer
- Falcon (storage engine), a MySQL storage engine
- Falcon (video game), a flight simulator video game
- Falcon Northwest, a high-end computer manufacturer in the US, specialising in gaming PCs
- A PDP-11 model, the SBC 11/21 (boardname KXT11), nicknamed "Falcon"
- Falcon, a hardware revision of Microsoft's Xbox 360 video game console
- Falcon (signature scheme), "Fast Fourier lattice-based compact signatures over NTRU", a digital signature scheme

== Military ==
- AIM-4 Falcon, first operational guided air-to-air missile of the US Air Force
- AIM-26 Falcon, a U.S. nuclear capable air-to-air missile
- AIM-47 Falcon, a U.S. long-range air-to-air missile
- AGM-76 Falcon, an experimental US high speed nuclear strike air-to-surface missile
- Curtiss Falcon, a post-World War I observation biplane
- General Dynamics F-16 Fighting Falcon, a fighter aircraft
- HMS Falcon, the name of 22 ships of the Royal Navy
  - RAF Hal Far, an airfield on Malta called HMS Falcon while it was a Royal Navy base
- USS Falcon, the name of four ships of the US Navy
- DARPA Falcon Project, a two-part joint project between the Defense Advanced Research Projects Agency and the US Air Force
- Falcon Air Force Base, former name of Schriever Space Force Base, near Colorado Springs, Colorado, US
- Joint Security Station Falcon, a former US military forward operating base in Iraq
- Falcon Turret, a Jordanian main battle tank turret
- ZVI Falcon, a sniper rifle

== People ==
- Falcon (surname)
- Falcon Heene, the young boy involved in the balloon boy hoax of 2009
- Falcon Stuart (1941–2002), British photographer, retailer, filmmaker, manager and music producer

== Places ==
=== United States ===
- Falcon, Colorado, an unincorporated community
- Falcon, Kentucky
- Falcon, Mississippi
- Falcon, North Carolina
- Falcon, Tennessee
- Falcon Dam, Texas
- Falcon Village, Texas

=== Elsewhere ===
- Falcon, Western Australia, a suburb of Mandurah
- Falcon Lake (disambiguation), various bodies of water in Canada, the U.S. and Mexico
- Falkenfelsen, or Falcon Rock, a granite formation in Germany

== Schools ==
- Falcon College, an all-boys independent boarding school in Esigodini, Zimbabwe
- Falcon High School, Falcon, Colorado, US

== School mascots ==
- American Cooperative School of Tunis
- United States Air Force Academy
- Aplington–Parkersburg High School
- Clear Lake High School (Houston, Texas)
- Flowery Branch High School
- Henry Ford II High School
- Frontier Central High School

== Sports ==
- Falcon Field (Corinth, Texas), a baseball field
- Falcon Baseball Field, in Colorado Springs, Colorado

== Transport ==
=== Aviation ===
- Buckeye Falcon, an American powered parachute design
- Dassault Falcon, a family of business jets manufactured by Dassault Aviation
- Dassault Falcon 900, a French-built corporate trijet aircraft made by Dassault Aviation
- Falcon Air, a defunct Swedish airline
- Falcon Air Express, a defunct airline based in Miami, Florida
- Falcon Express Cargo Airlines, an airline based in the United Arab Emirates
- Hansjörg Streifeneder Falcon, a German sailplane
- Miles Falcon, a 1930s British three/four-seat cabin monoplane
- Rolls-Royce Falcon, a World War I-era aircraft engine
- Wills Wing Falcon, an American hang glider design
- Falcon Field (Arizona), an airport
- Atlanta Regional Airport, also known as Falcon Field, a public use airport in Fayette County, Georgia, US

=== Maritime ===
- Falcon, a ship of the Third Supply fleet to Virginia colony in 1609
- Falcon, a small sailing vessel used by Edward Frederick Knight to explore the Baltic
- SS Falcon, a steamship built in 1945 as Sasbeck, and named Falcon 1968–69

=== Rail ===
- British Rail Class 53 Falcon, a class of lightweight electric-diesel locomotives made in 1961
- Falcon, a South Devon Railway Comet class 4-4-0ST steam locomotive involved in a crash

=== Road ===
- Dennis Falcon, a bus model manufactured by Dennis Specialist Vehicles
- Falcon Cycles, a British bicycle manufacturer
- Falcon Shells, a British automobile manufacturer
- Falcon Motorsports, an American manufacturer of high performance automobiles
- Chrysler Falcon, a concept sports car made by Chrysler
- Various cars produced by Ford
  - Ford Falcon (Argentina), a compact car built by the Ford Motor Company of Argentina
  - Ford Falcon (Australia), a full-size car manufactured by the Ford Motor Company of Australia
  - Ford Falcon (North America), a compact car produced by Ford Motor Company
  - Ford Falcon van, a passenger van produced by the Ford Motor Company in the 1960s
- Jonway Falcon, a crossover SUV by Jonway Automobile

=== Rocketry and space ===
- Falcon 1, a SpaceX launch vehicle
- Falcon 5, a proposed partially reusable launch vehicle designed by SpaceX
- Falcon 9, a partially reusable launch vehicle produced by SpaceX
- Falcon Heavy, a partially reusable launch vehicle produced by SpaceX
- Apollo 15 Lunar Module (callsign "Falcon")
- Viper Falcon, a U.S. sounding rocket
- The Falcon Project, a UK and U.S. rocket company by Daniel Jubb

== Other uses ==
- Operation FALCON, several dragnets for fugitives organized by the US Marshals Service
- Typhoon Falcon (disambiguation)
- FALCON (cable system), a submarine communications cable connecting several countries in the Persian Gulf and India
- Falcon (Duinrell), a Gerstlauer Eurofighter model roller coaster at Duinrell amusement park
- Corpus Christi Carol, a medieval song sometimes called the "Falcon Carol"

== See also ==
- Falcons (disambiguation)
- Falcón (disambiguation)
- Falkon, a web browser
- Falcon Heights (disambiguation)
- Falcone (disambiguation)
- Falcones (disambiguation)
- Flacon
- Falken Tires, a subsidiary of Sumitomo
