= Falcón (disambiguation) =

Falcón is a state in Venezuela

Falcón may also refer to:

== Places ==
- Falcón Zulia, a historical Venezuelan state (1881–1890), often simply called Falcón State
- Falcón Municipality, Cojedes, Venezuela
- Falcón Municipality, Falcón, Venezuela
- Falcón Reservoir / Falcón Lake, Mexico-Texas border
- Falcon Dam, Mexico-Texas border
- Sierra de Falcón, Venezuela

== People ==
- Ada Falcón (1905–2002), Argentine tango dancer, singer and film actress
- Angelo Falcón (1951–2018), Puerto Rican political scientist
- Blas María de la Garza Falcón (1712–1767), Spanish settler in North America
- Henri Falcón (born 1961), Venezuelan politician
- Iris Falcón (born 1973), Peruvian volleyball player
- Ismael Falcón (born 1984), Spanish footballer
- José Falcón (1944–1974), Portuguese bullfighter
- José Miguel Falcón, governor of Coahuila y Tejas in 1835
- Juan Carlos Falcón (born 1979), Argentine footballer
- Juan Crisóstomo Falcón (1820–1870), President of Venezuela from 1863 to 1868
- Juan Falcón (actor) (born 1965), Cuban-Chilean actor
- Lidia Falcón (born 1935), Spanish writer and feminist
- Miguel Falcón García-Ramos (born 1979), Spanish footballer and manager
- Ramón Lorenzo Falcón (1855–1909), Argentine politician
- Rodolfo Falcón (born 1972), Cuban Olympic swimmer
- Rubén Falcón (born 1977), Spanish footballer
- Yael Falcón (born 1988), Argentine FIFA football referee

== Other uses ==
- Falcón (TV series), based on the books by Robert Wilson

== See also ==
- Falcon (disambiguation)
- Falcon (surname)
