= HMS Falcon =

Twenty-two ships of the Royal Navy have borne the name HMS Falcon. They are named after an exceptionally fast bird of prey.

- HMS Falcon (1334) was a "ballinger" (a moderate-size oared vessel) dating from 1334. She was sold in 1352.
- HMS Falcon (1461) was a ship in service from 1461 to 1485.
- HMS Falcon (1544) was a pinnace in service from 1544 to 1578.
- HMS Falcon (1603) was a ship of 180 bm in service in 1603.
- HMS Falcon (1646) was a 24-gun ship purchased in 1646. She was gone by 1659.
- HMS Falcon (1647) was a 6-gun vessel captured from the Royalists in 1646. She was last listed in 1653.
- HMS Falcon (1652) was a 10-gun ship captured from the Dutch in 1652. She was used as a fireship in 1653 and sold in 1658. She was also known as Golden Falcon.
- HMS Falcon (1666) was a 36-gun fifth rate launched in 1666. She was upgraded to a 42-gun fourth rate in 1668, but reverted to a 36-gun fifth rate in 1691. In 1694 she was captured by the French in the Mediterranean.
- HMS Falcon (1694) was a 24-gun sixth rate launched in 1694. In 1695 she was captured by three French ships off Dodman. She was recaptured in 1703 and broken up.
- HMS Falcon (1694) was converted from a merchant ship in 1694 to a 38-gun fifth rate. She was captured by the French in 1695.
- HMS Falcon (1704) was a 32-gun fourth rate launched in 1704. In 1709 she was captured by the French 58-gun Sérieux in the Mediterranean.
- HMS Falcon (1744) was a 14-gun sloop launched in 1744. In 1745 she was captured by the French off Saint Malo. She was recaptured in 1746 and renamed Fortune. Sold in 1770.
- HMS Falcon (1745) was a 14-gun sloop launched in 1745. She was converted to an 8-gun bombardment ship in 1758. She was wrecked in the West Indies in 1759.
- HMS Falcon (1771) was a 14-gun sloop launched in 1771. She was involved in the Battle off Fairhaven, said to be the first naval engagement of the American Revolution. She was sunk in 1778 as a blockship in Narragansett Bay, was salvaged, and then sank in 1779.
- HMS Falcon (1782) was a 14-gun brig-sloop launched in 1782. She was used as a fireship and expended in 1800 at Dunkirk Roads.
- HMS Falcon (1801) was a 14-gun sloop. She was launched as Diadem in 1799; the Admiralty purchased her in 1801 and renamed her Falcon. It sold her in 1816.
- HMS Falcon (1808) was a Danish 16-gun sloop that was found abandoned in 1807 near Danzig. She was in service in 1808.
- HMS Falcon (1820) was a 10-gun Cherokee-class brig-sloop launched in 1820. An engine was fitted in 1833 and then removed the following year. She was sold in 1838.
- HMS Falcon (1854) was a 17-gun Cruizer-class sloop launched in 1854. She was sold in 1869.
- HMS Falcon (1877) was a 14-gun Condor-class gunvessel launched in 1877. She was put into harbour service in 1890 and sold in 1920.
- HMS Falcon (1899) was a small C-class destroyer launched in 1899. In 1918 she was sunk in a collision with the trawler John Fitzgerald in the North Sea.
- HMS Falcon (1931) was a river gunboat launched in 1931. She was handed over to the Chinese Navy in 1942, and renamed Lung Huang. Became Ying Teh in 1948 and Nan Chiang in 1950. Served until 1974.
- HMS Falcon (Hal Far, Malta) was a Royal Navy Air Station at Hal Far, Malta.
