= Falcon Express =

Falcon Express may refer to:

- Falcon Express Cargo Airlines, a former Dubai cargo airline
- Falcon Express (film), a 2025 French animated action comedy film

== See also ==
- Falcon Air Express, an American charter airline
