= Falcons (disambiguation) =

Falcons are a genus of raptor (bird of prey).

Falcons may also refer to:

== School sports teams ==
- Adamson Soaring Falcons, a collegiate basketball (UAAP) team in the Philippines
- Air Force Falcons, the sports teams of the United States Air Force Academy
- Bentley Falcons, the sports teams of Bentley University in Waltham, Massachusetts
- Bowling Green Falcons, the sports teams of Bowling Green State University in Bowling Green, Ohio
- Falcon College, an independent, boarding school for boys aged 12–18 in Matebeleland South, Zimbabwe
- Friends Falcons, the sports teams of Friends University in Wichita, Kansas
- NIST International School Falcons, the sports teams of NIST International School in Bangkok, Thailand
- Notre Dame Falcons, the sports team of Notre Dame College in South Euclid, Ohio
- Seattle Pacific Falcons, the sports teams of Seattle Pacific University in Seattle, Washington
- St. Augustine's Falcons, the sports teams of St. Augustine's University in Raleigh, North Carolina
- UT Permian Basin Falcons, the sports teams of the University of Texas of the Permian Basin in Odessa, Texas

== Other sports teams ==
- Atlanta Falcons, an NFL (American) football team
- Bata Falcons, an association football club based in Montserrat
- Detroit Falcons (disambiguation), several teams
- Geelong Falcons, a youth Australian Rules Football club
- Gippsland Falcons SC, an Australian association football club active 1963–2001
- Kandy Falcons, a cricket team in the Lanka Premier League
- Kelowna Falcons, a baseball team in the West Coast League
- Mumbai Falcons, an Indian motorsports team
- Newcastle Falcons, a rugby team based in Newcastle, England
- Nürnberg Falcons BC, a basketball club based in Nuremberg, Germany
- RAF Falcons, a British military parachute display team
- Springfield Falcons, an American Hockey League team
- St. Catharines Falcons (1943–1947), a junior ice hockey team in St. Catharines, Ontario, active 1943–1947
- St. Catharines Falcons (1968–), a junior ice hockey team in St. Catharines, Ontario
- Team Falcons, a Saudi esports organization
- Ukrainian Falcons, the aerobatic demonstration team of the Ukrainian Air Force
- USA Falcons, a national rugby union team
- West Perth Football Club, an Australian rules football club
- Winnipeg Falcons, a Canadian ice hockey team
- Valke (rugby union), a South African rugby team who play in the Currie Cup, who are sometimes known by their English name the Falcons

== Entertainment ==
- The Falcons, an American rhythm and blues vocal group
- Falcons (film), a 2002 Icelandic film
- The Falcons (film), a 1970 Hungarian film

== Other uses ==
- Socialist Youth of Germany – Falcons, a voluntary organisation
- Iraqi Falcons Intelligence Cell, an anti-terrorism unit

== See also ==
- Falcon (disambiguation)
