= SS Sea Falcon =

SS Sea Falcon may refer to:

- SS Sea Falcon (1944), a Type C3-S-A2 ship built by Ingalls Shipbuilding for the United States Maritime Commission (MC hull no. 880); sold in 1947; scrapped in 1978
- SS Sea Falcon (1945), a later name for the German-built SS Indus; known as Sea Falcon from 1968–1971; scrapped in 1971
