= Jadacaquiva =

Jadacaquiva, Falcón
- Town
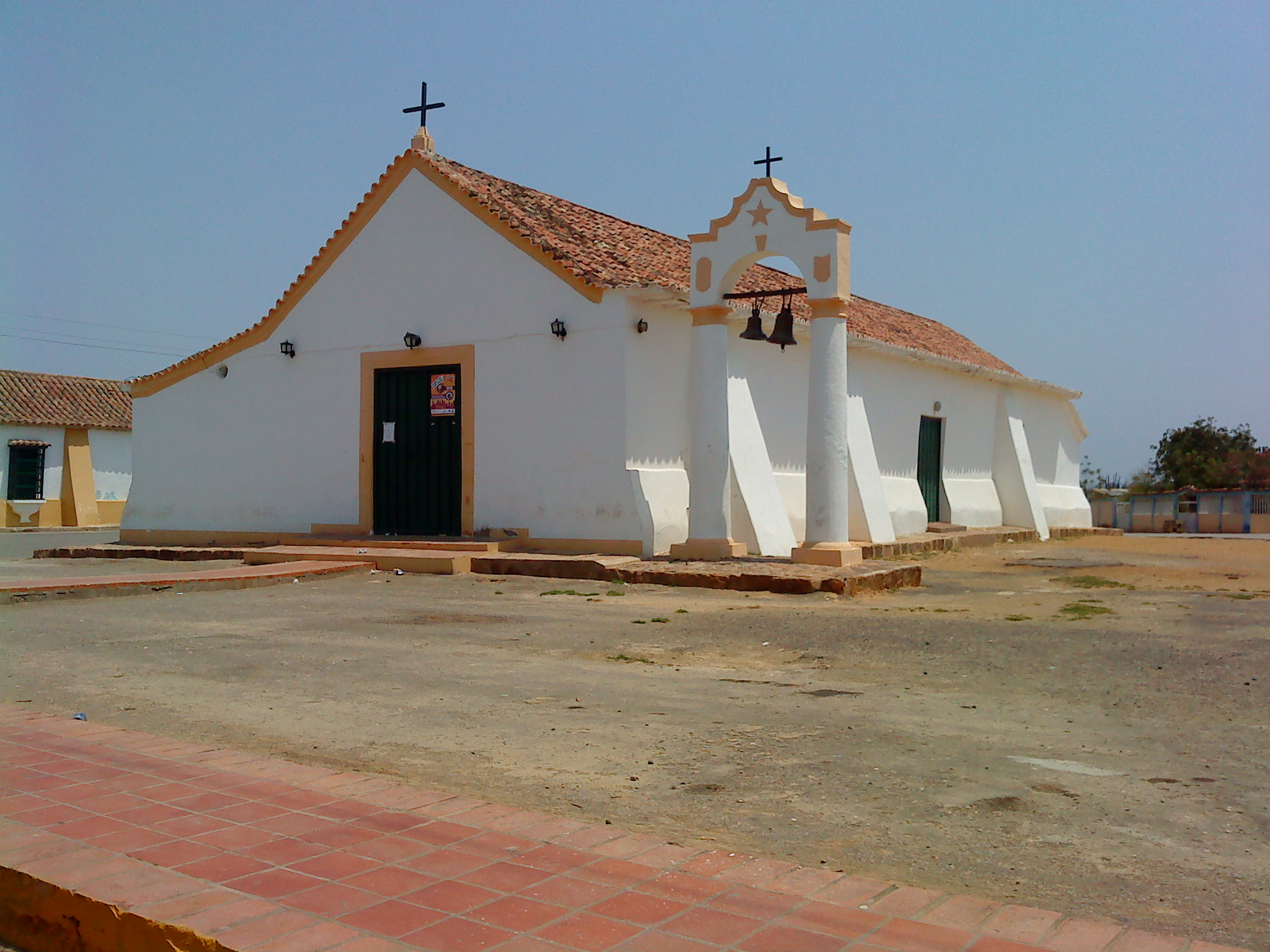
- Jadacaquiva church.

- Location within Venezuela
- Coordinates: 11°54′24″N 70°5′43″W
- Country: Venezuela
- State: Falcón
- Established: c. [1700]

Population (2000)
  - Total: 2,967
- Time zone: UTC– 4:30 (Venezuela)
- Area code: 269

Jadacaquiva is a town in Falcón Municipality, Falcón State, Venezuela. The population was 2,967 at the 2000 census.

== Demographics ==
As of the census of 2000, there were 2,967 people, 811 households, and 586 families residing in the town. The gender makeup of the town was 1,523 males (51.33%) and 1,444 females (48.67%).

== History ==
Jadacaquiva was founded on land bought at the end of the 18th century by Alonso Arias. In 1773, Bishop Mariano Martí visited Jadacaquiva and counted 48 houses and 395 inhabitants. It became a parish in 1819, under the sponsorship of Mérida's Bishop Rafael Lasso de la Vega.

Venezuelan Marshal and President Juan Crisóstomo Falcón was born in a nearby farm in 1820.

== Main sights ==
Jadacaquiva's church was built by Alejandro de Quevedo Villegas and his wife, Rosa, in 1749. The construction was a last will mandate by local landowner Diego Laguna.

The church has architectural elements of the Jewish religion. The structure of the campanile, separate from the church, is styled Caribbean Dutch (common to Curaçao architecture). It is believed that masons from the nearby island of Curaçao were brought to help during its construction.
