= Challenger 1 =

UK main battle tank

FV 4030 Challenger
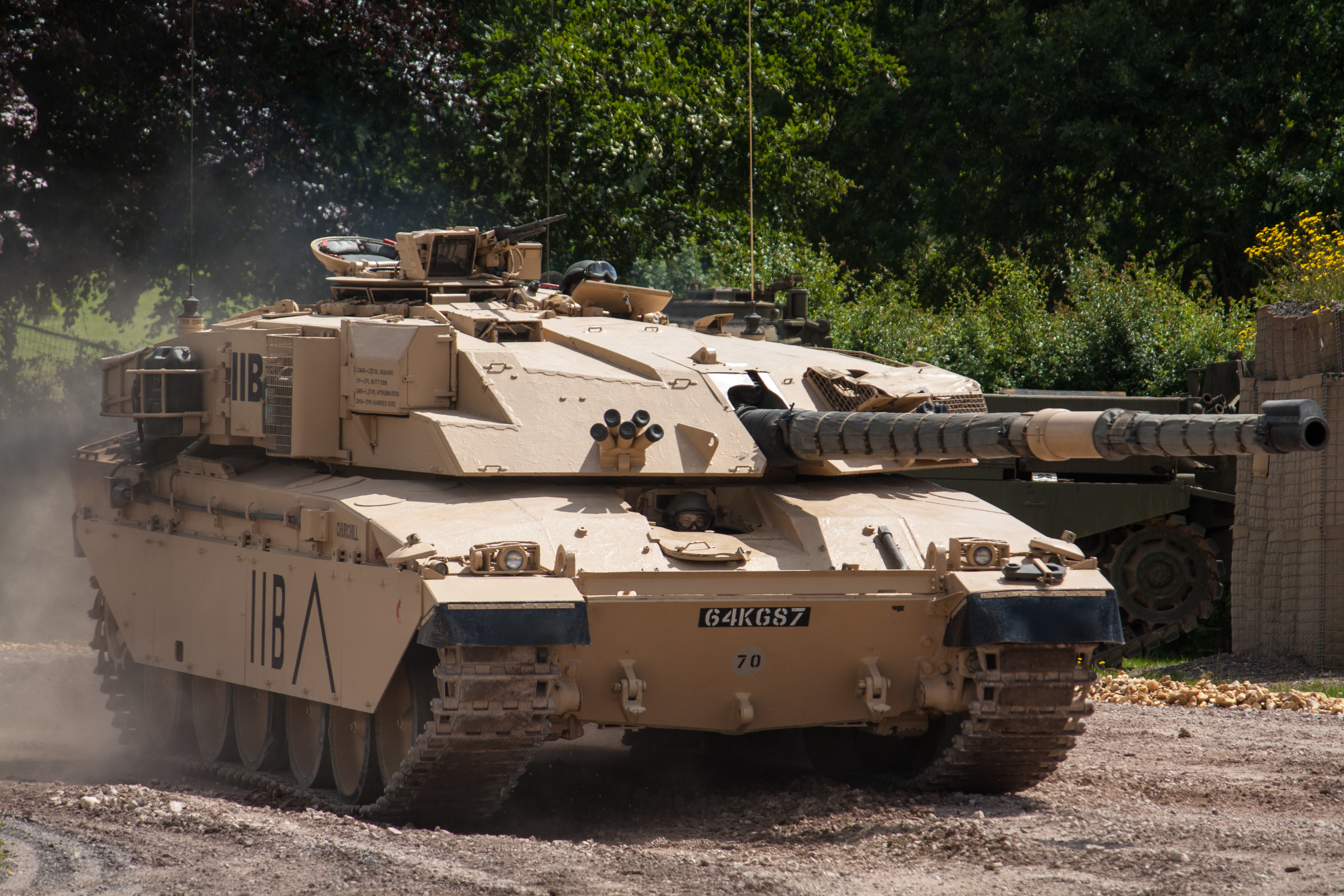
- Challenger 1 at Tankfest 2009 at The Tank Museum
- Type: Main battle tank
- Place of origin: United Kingdom

Service history
- In service: UK: 1983–2001 (repair and recovery derivative remains in service.); Jordan: 1999–2022 (now stored)
- Used by: British Army; Royal Jordanian Army
- Wars: Persian Gulf War

Production history
- Manufacturer: Royal Ordnance Factory
- Unit cost: £1.5 million (1987)
- Produced: 1983–1990
- No. built: 420

Specifications
- Mass: 62 t (61 long tons; 68 short tons); 70 t (69 long tons; 77 short tons) with additional armour modules
- Length: 11.56 m (37 ft 11 in) (gun forward)
- Width: 3.51 m (11 ft 6 in)
- Height: 2.95 m (9 ft 8 in) (top of commander sight)
- Crew: 4 (commander, gunner, loader, driver)
- Armour: Chobham composite ceramic vehicle armour
- Main armament: Royal Ordnance L11A5 120 mm rifled gun 64 rounds
- Secondary armament: 7.62 mm L8A2, 7.62 mm L37A2 machine guns 4,000 rounds
- Engine: Perkins CV12 26 litre diesel 1,200 hp (895 kW)
- Power/weight: 14.4 kW/tonne
- Transmission: David Brown TN37 transmission (4 fwd, 3 rev.)
- Suspension: Hydropneumatic (hydrogas)
- Operational range: 280 mi (450 km) on road
- Maximum speed: 35 mph (56 km/h)

The FV4030/4 Challenger 1 is a British main battle tank (MBT) used by the British Army from 1983 to 2001, when it was superseded by the Challenger 2. The majority of the Challenger 1 fleet was subsequently sold to Jordan where it remained in service with the Royal Jordanian Army until withdrawals were announced in 2018.

Known locally as Al-Hussein, these vehicles received various Jordanian modifications before being replaced by French-made Leclerc tanks from the UAE and ex-Italian Centauro 8x8 wheeled tank destroyers. The Jordanian Challenger 1 fleet had been retired by January 2023.

== History ==
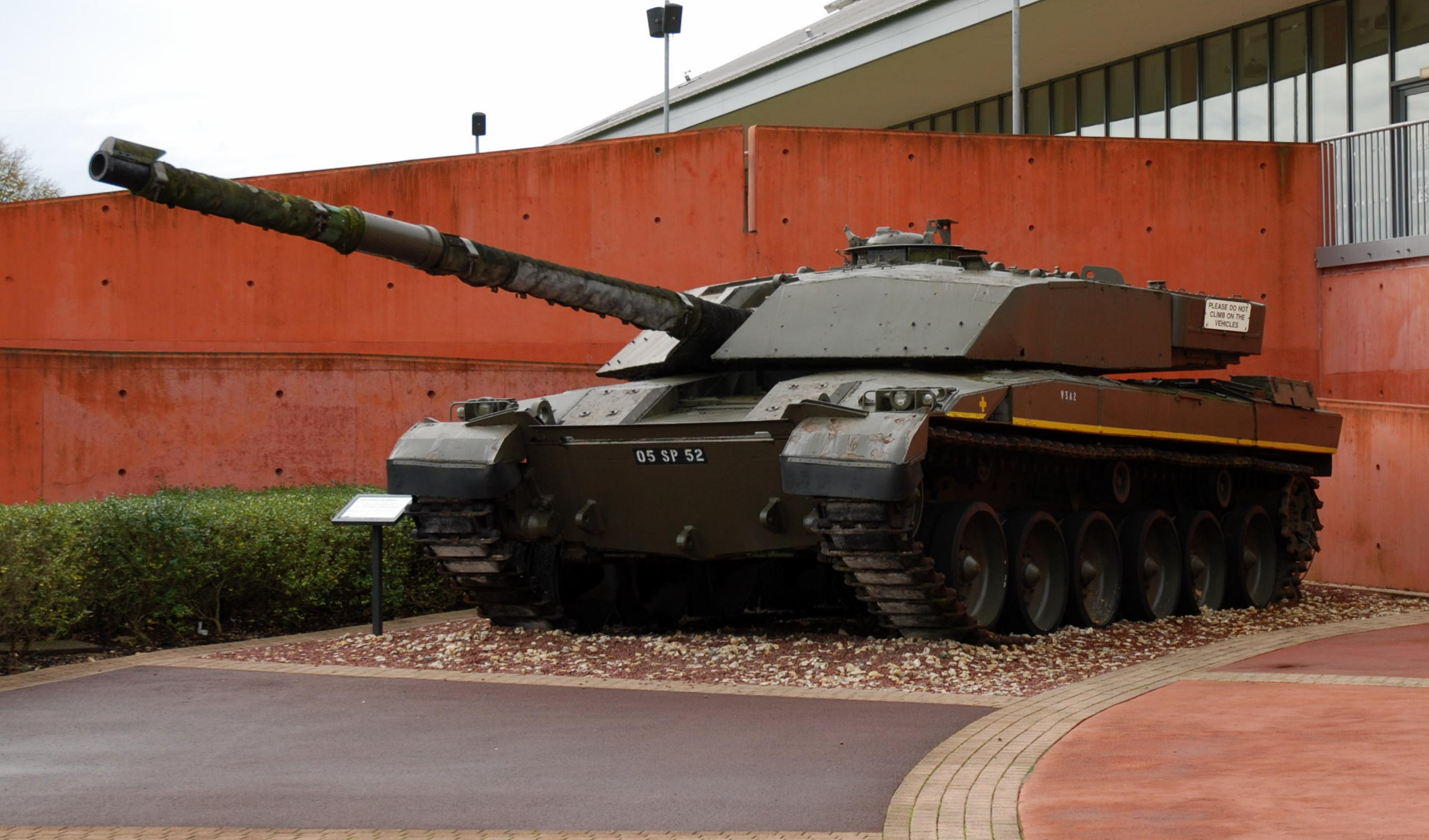
Challenger 1 on display at The Tank Museum, Bovington. This vehicle was used for suspension testing.

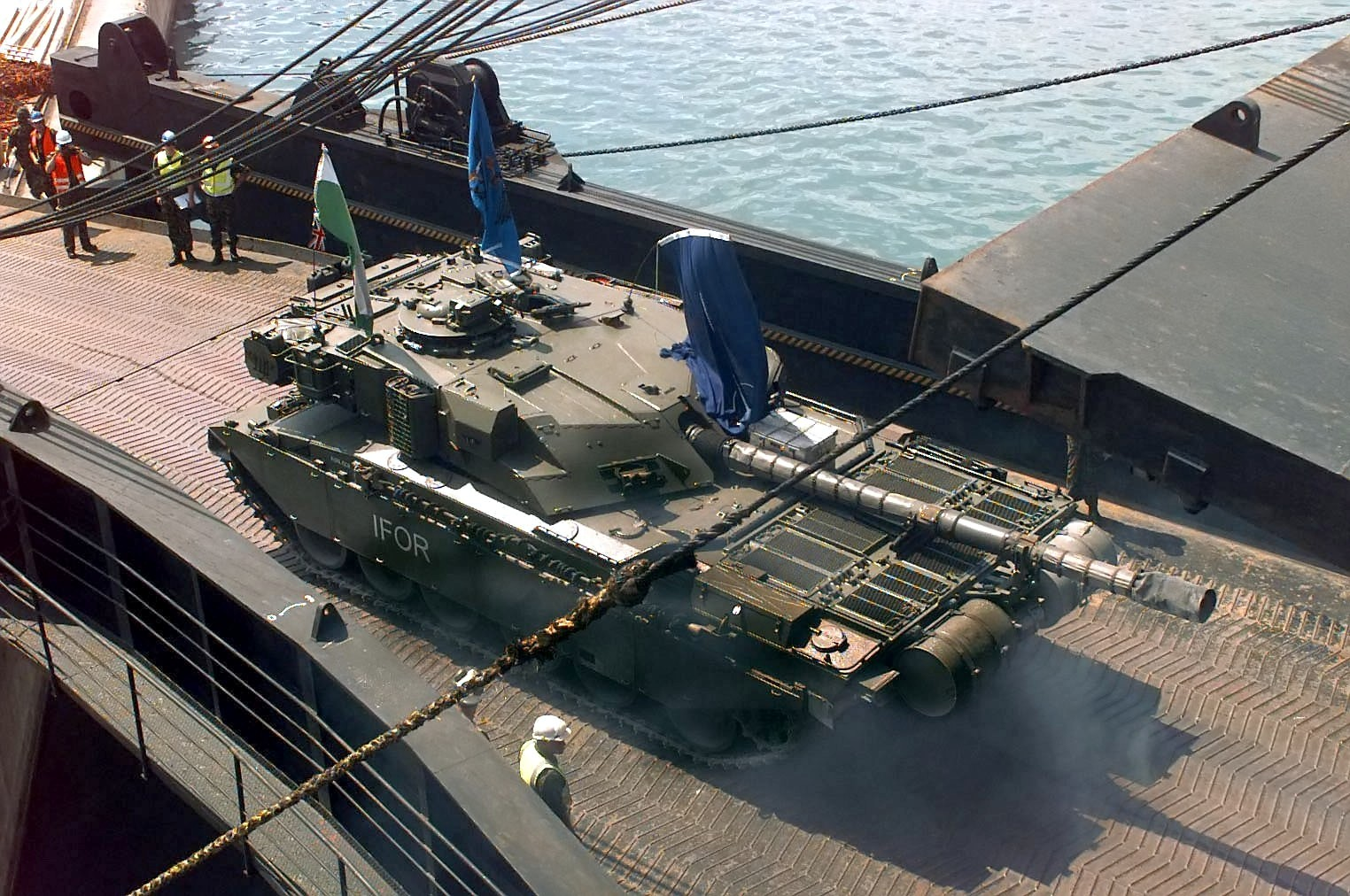
Challenger 1 of the 1st The Queen's Dragoon Guards with IFOR markings

The Challenger design by the former Military Vehicles and Engineering Establishment (MVEE) near Chobham in Surrey originated in an Iranian order for an improved version of the Chieftain line of tanks in service around the world. These were the Chieftain Mk5(P)- FV4030/1, FV4030/2 Shir (Lion) 1 and 4030/3 Shir 2. With the fall of the Shah of Iran and the collapse of the UK's MBT-80 project, the British Army became the customer and the tank was further developed by MVEE to meet Western European requirements. For a short time the tank was named "Cheviot" (the name of a hill range) before becoming "Challenger", a name reused from the Cruiser Mk VIII Challenger tank of World War II.

The most advanced aspect of the Challenger 1 design was its Chobham armour, which gave protection far superior to any monolithic Rolled Homogeneous Armour (RHA), then standard of western tank armour material. This armour was later adopted by other designs, including the American M1 Abrams. Additionally, the hydropneumatic suspension provided outstanding cross-country performance through the long suspension arm travel and controlled bump and rebound behaviour offered.

The Challenger was built by the Royal Ordnance Factories (ROF). The Challenger 1 entered service with the British Army in 1983 and production ceased in 1990 at a cost of around £2 million each. In 1986, ROF Leeds (and the Challenger production line) was acquired by Vickers Defence Systems (later Alvis Vickers).

The Ministry of Defence was keen to show off the capabilities of the Challenger 1 in the Canadian Army Trophy Competition (CAT '87), held at Grafenwöhr, West Germany, in June 1987. The best performing team in preparatory competitions had been the 2nd Royal Tank Regiment, although its Challengers had not been fitted with Thermal Observation and Gunnery Sight (TOGS), which would put them at a disadvantage. The Royal Hussars had a squadron fitted with TOGS; however, they had been training at BATUS in Canada with Chieftains, instead of training with Challenger and TOGS for CAT '87. Twenty-two new Challengers with TOGS were specially diverted from the production line for the competition, resulting in teething problems. At the competition itself, the Hussars were placed last in the league table. In a statement to the House of Commons on 14 July, Ian Stewart, the Minister of State for the Armed Forces, said; "I do not believe that the performance of tanks in the artificial circumstances of a competition, such as the recent Canadian Army Trophy, is a proper indication of their capability in war." Following poor results in 1985 with the Chieftain, and in 1987 with the Challenger, the British Army decided in December 1987 to withdraw indefinitely from the competition. Its performance in the 1987 Canadian Army Trophy competition, which Polish-British tank historian Richard Ogorkiewicz characterized as "dismal", prompted the MoD to initiate the Challenger 2 program.

A requirement for a new MBT was later issued. Proposals put forward for the new specification included an improved Challenger from Vickers, the American M1 Abrams, the French Leclerc, and the German Leopard 2. The Vickers Defence Systems design, designated Challenger 2, was eventually selected. This tank is significantly more capable than its predecessor: based on the same basic MVEE-designed hull, it features a new turret based on the Vickers Private Venture Mk7 design and improved Chobham armour.

Withdrawals of the Challenger 1 from the British Army began in 1998 and it had been completely replaced by the Challenger 2 by 2001. The bulk of these vehicles were exported to Jordan with around 20 vehicles retained for testing, development, and museum display. There was also a Challenger Marksman SPAAG version, equipped with the Marksman turret.

=== Use by Jordan ===
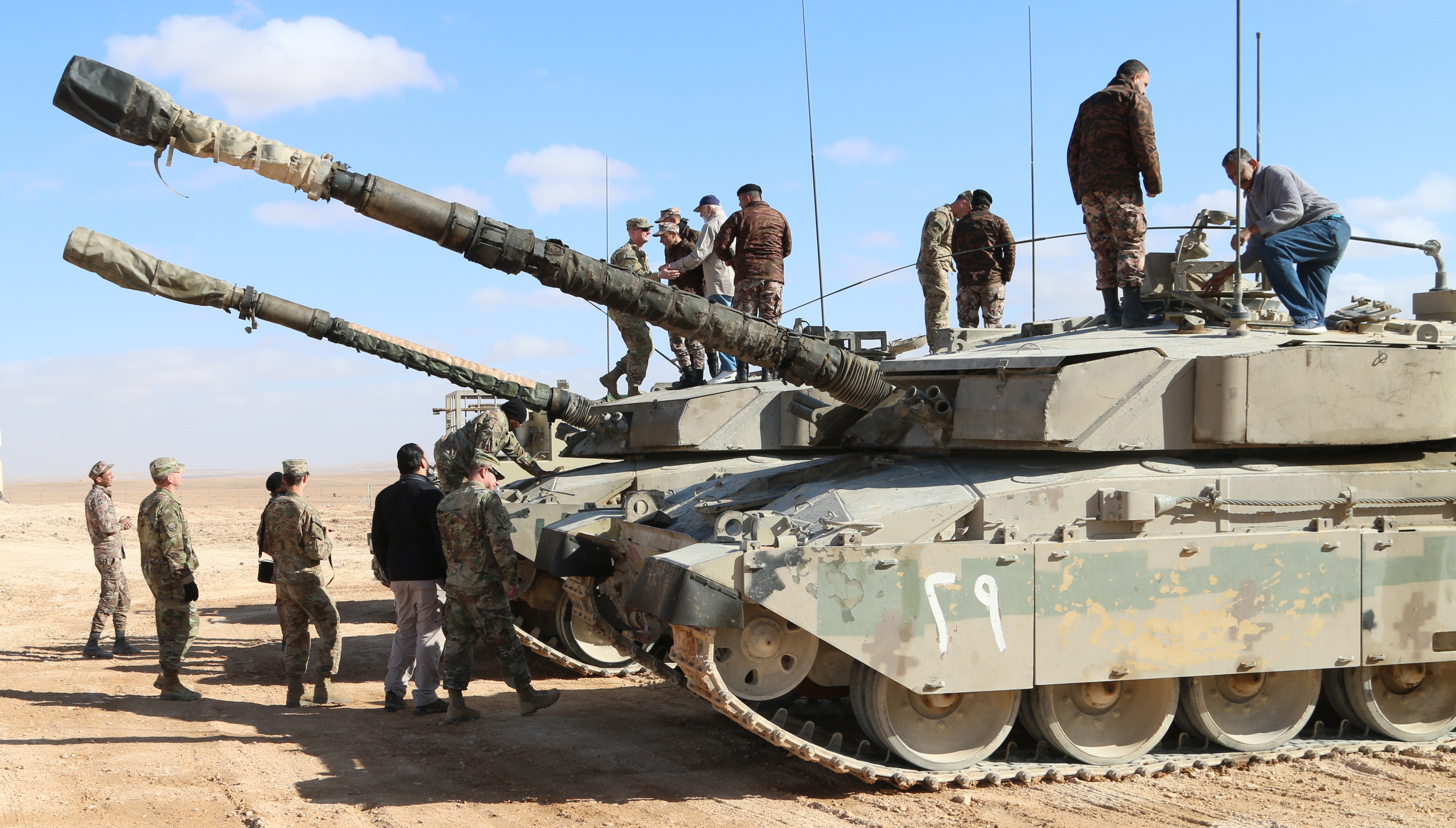
Jordanian Challenger 1 Al-Hussein tanks in 2017

In the 1980s, Jordan had been interested in purchasing the original Shir 1 design, and subsequently ordered 274 Khalid tanks. The success of Khalid maintained the Jordanian interest in British made tanks.

The replacement of Challenger 1 tanks in British service by the Challenger 2 coincided with the accession of Abdullah II as King of Jordan. The new king had strong links with Britain, having begun his military career, while a prince, as an officer cadet at Royal Military Academy Sandhurst, serving for a year as a troop commander in the 13th/18th Royal Hussars, a British armoured cavalry regiment, before returning to Jordan. As a member of the Royal Jordanian Army, he became a tank company commander. Abdullah had thought he would spend his life in the military, but on 24 January 1999, weeks before his father's death, he replaced his uncle Hassan as heir apparent.

In March 1999, after Abdullah II had ascended to the throne, the British Government, in a show of support of Abdullah's foreign policy, and in response to a request from the new king, announced an agreement to supply Jordan with up to 288 Challenger 1 tanks as they came out of British service. These tanks had an average in-service book value of £750,000 per unit, that would reduce to zero upon withdrawal. The tanks were therefore supplied to Jordan at no cost, with the Jordanian Government agreeing to cover any transfer costs arising. The deal also included 112 support vehicles. This first tranche of vehicles were supplied to Jordan over a three-year period from 1999 to 2002 and enabled the replacement of the Jordanian Centurion fleet (known locally as Tariq). In late 2002 a further 114 Challenger 1 MBTs and 19 training tanks were 'gifted' to Jordan. These vehicles had an in-service book value of £385,000 per unit but were also supplied to Jordan for the cost of the logistics of transfer.

The 402 Jordanian Challenger 1 tanks received substantial local modifications and were known in Jordanian service as Al-Hussein. Plans to upgrade Jordanian Challengers with a locally designed unmanned turret called Falcon were unveiled in 2003 and prototypes were produced. However, the design never reached full production and by 2016 had been shelved. The Jordanian Challenger 1 fleet was retired by January 2023. being replaced by French-made Leclerc tanks from the UAE and ex-Italian Centauro 8x8 wheeled tank destroyers.

The withdrawn Jordanian vehicles are now in storage. In light of the 2022 Russian invasion of Ukraine, there is speculation that these vehicles could be acquired from Jordan and refurbished for Ukrainian use.

== Operational service ==
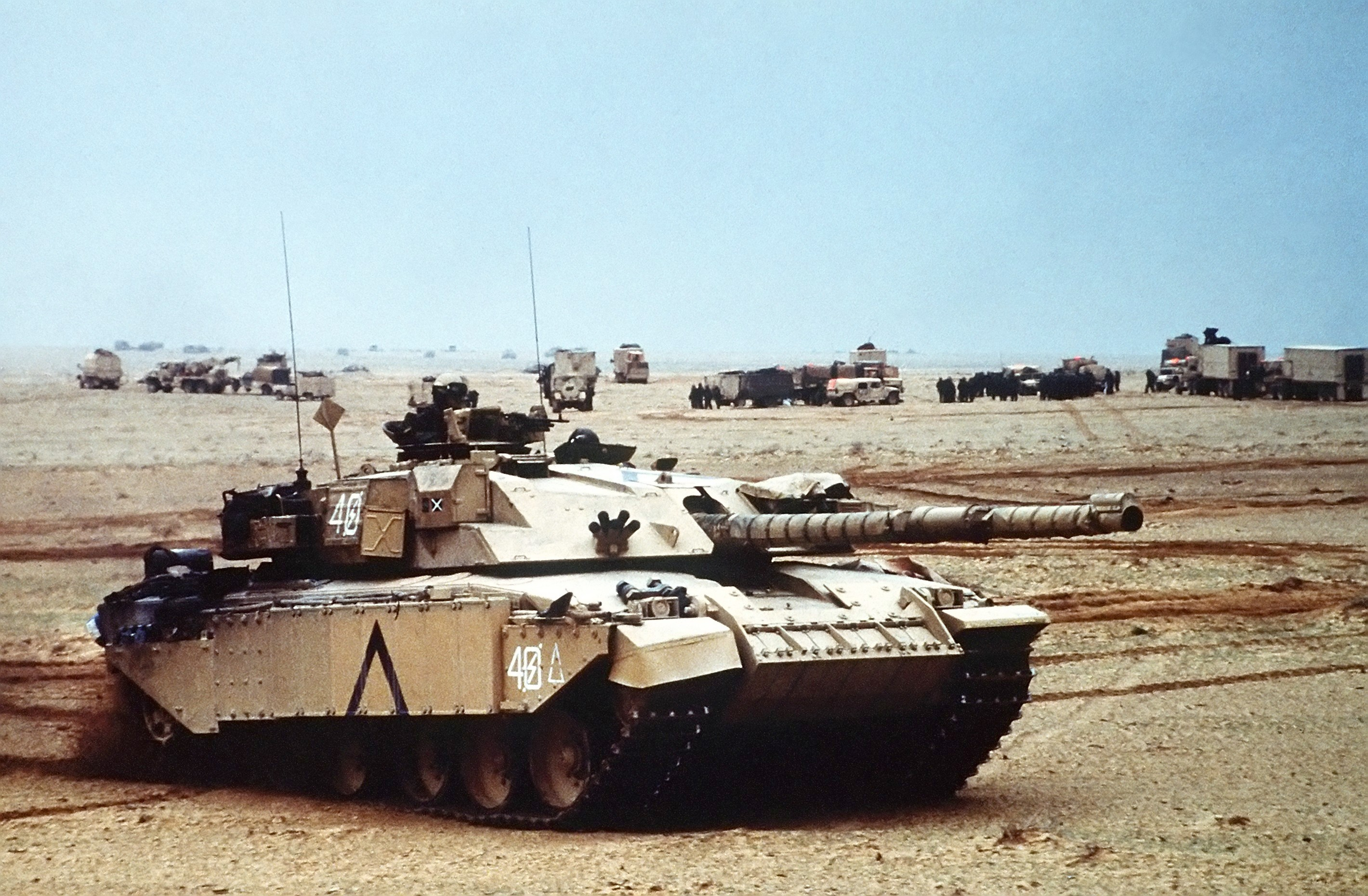
Challenger 1 of the Royal Scots Dragoon Guards near Kuwait City during the Gulf War

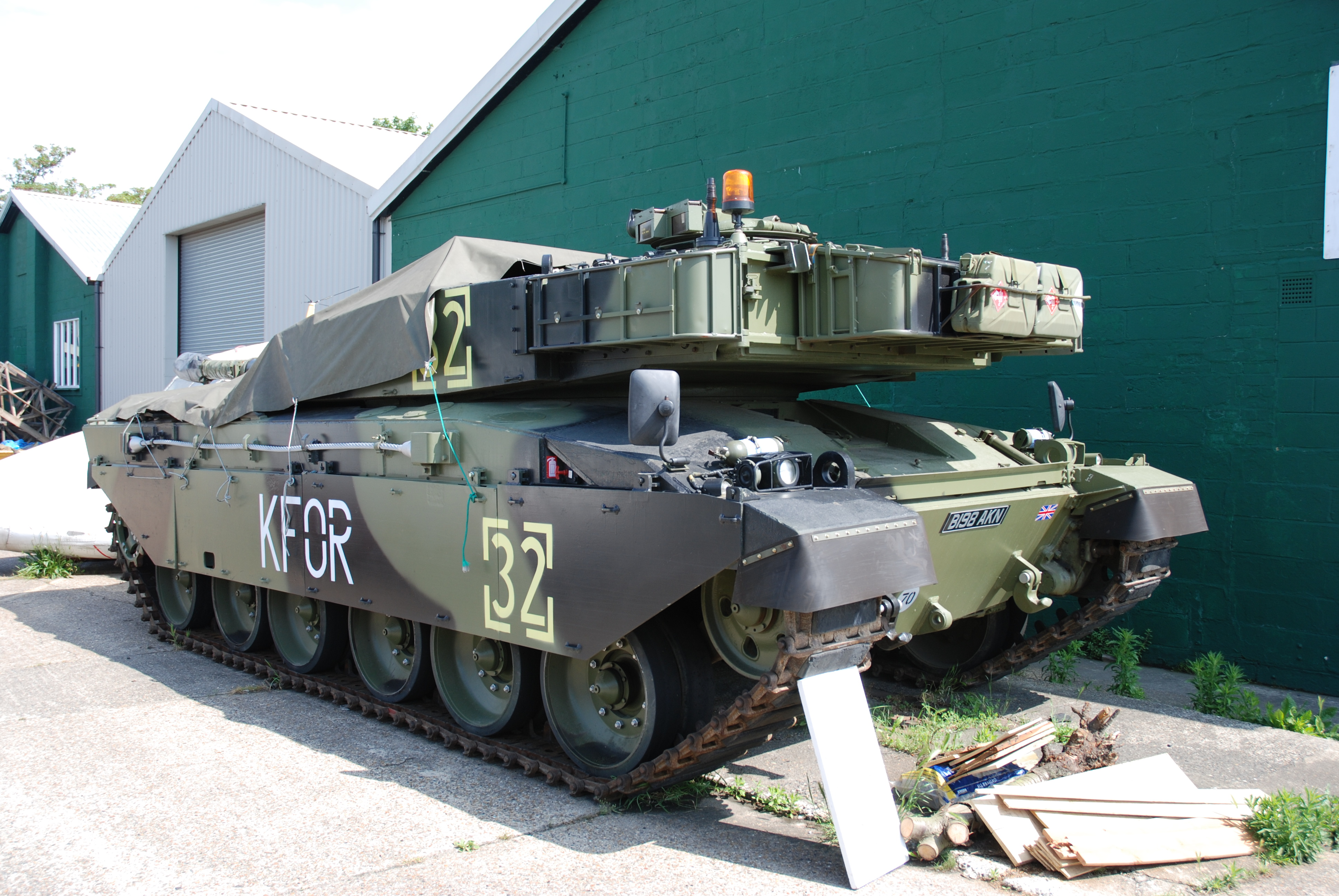
A preserved Challenger 1 displayed at RAF Manston in 2007 wearing KFOR markings

In 1990, in preparation for Operation Granby, the UK operation in the First Gulf War, 221 Challenger 1 tanks were deployed to Saudi Arabia.

This deployment originally consisted of the 7th Armoured Brigade, consisting of two armoured regiments, the Queen's Royal Irish Hussars and the Royal Scots Dragoon Guards, both equipped with 57 of the latest Mark 3 version of the Challenger 1. They were modified for desert operations by a REME team and civilian contractors at the quayside in Al Jubayl, Saudi Arabia. This fit included additional Chobham Armour along the hull sides and explosive reactive armour (ERA) on the nose and front glacis plate. Modifications also included the provision of extra external fuel drums and a smoke generator.

There were major concerns about the reliability of the vehicle. Before the commencement of the Gulf War deployment only 22% of Challenger 1s were operational because of faults and lack of spares. In addition there were serious worries about how a tank designed to perform in temperate climates would stand the rigours of desert warfare.

On 22 November 1990, it was decided to add the 4th Armoured Brigade to the force, under the umbrella of 1st (UK) Armoured Division. The new brigade had a single Challenger regiment, 14th/20th King's Hussars, equipped with 43 Challenger 1 tanks and reinforced by a squadron of the Life Guards. They were equipped with the Mark 2 version of the tank, which was upgraded by armouring the storage bins for the 120 mm charges as well as the additional armour fitted to the Mark 3.

During Operation Desert Shield it was decided that the 1st (UK) Armoured Division would be placed under the command of the US VII Corps. This corps would form the armoured fist of the Coalition forces, tasked with destroying the bulk of the Iraqi forces. The forces of VII Corps crossed the Saudi border into Iraq, and then crossed into Kuwait. The 1st (UK) Armoured Division was the easternmost unit in VII Corps' sector, its Challenger tanks forming the spearhead of the advance. The division advanced nearly 350 km within 97 hours, destroying the Iraqi 46th Mechanised Brigade, 52nd Armoured Brigade and elements of at least three infantry divisions belonging to the Iraqi 7th Corps in a series of battles and engagements. They captured or destroyed about 300 Iraqi tanks and a large number of armoured personnel carriers, trucks, reconnaissance vehicles, etc. Patrick Cordingley, the British commander of 7th Armoured Brigade, said later that the "Challenger is a tank built for combat and not competitions.".

The main threat to the Challenger was deemed to be the Iraqi Republican Guard's T-72M tanks; each British tank was provided with twelve L26A1 "Jericho" depleted uranium (DU) shells specifically for use against T-72Ms, but during the course of the Coalition's ground campaign none were encountered as the division was withdrawn beforehand.

After the Gulf War, Challenger 1 tanks were also used by the British Army in Bosnia and Herzegovina and Operation Joint Guardian, the NATO-led drive into Kosovo.

=== Challenger 1 gunnery ===
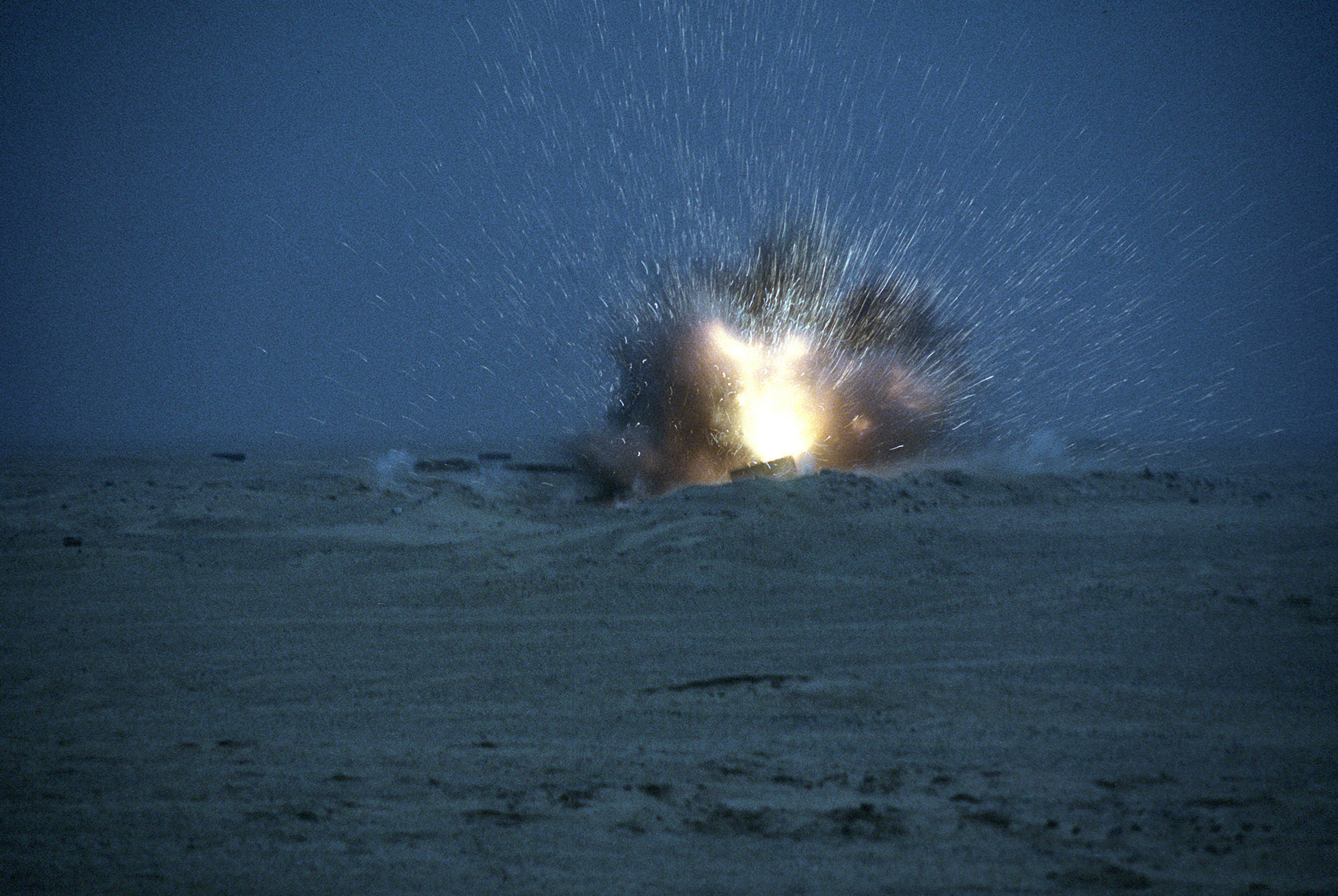
An Iraqi tank exploding after an attack by a Challenger 1 of the 1st (UK) Armoured Division during Operation Desert Storm, 28 February 1991

In action the Global Positioning System (GPS) and Thermal Observation and Gunnery System (TOGS) fitted to Challenger 1 proved to be decisive when engaging the enemy, allowing attacks to be made at night, in poor visibility and through smoke screens. During the First Gulf War, British Challengers destroyed roughly 300 Iraqi tanks without suffering a single loss in combat.

On 26 February 1991, a Challenger 1 under the command of Captain Tim Purbrick of the 17th/21st Lancers attached to the Queen's Royal Irish Hussars, destroyed an Iraqi T-55 tank at a range of 3600 metres, followed soon after by a petrol tanker at a range of 4700 metres using L23A1 APFSDS 'fin' rounds with tungsten–nickel–copper penetrators.

That same day, a tank of the Royal Scots Dragoon Guards engaged and destroyed an Iraqi tank at a range of 5100 metres using a L26A1 APFSDS with a depleted uranium penetrator. This is believed to be the distance record for a successful tank-on-tank, direct fire, kinetic round engagement.

== Versions and variants ==
- Challenger 1 Mk. 1: initial production version, the majority were produced with empty TOGS barbettes for the conversion programme to retrofit the system. 109 tanks built between February 1983 and January 1985.
- Challenger 1 Mk. 2: fitted with the Barr & Stroud/Pilkington Optronics TOGS (Thermal Observation and Gunnery System) thermal sight. 155 tanks built between January 1985 and November 1986.
- Challenger 1 Mk. 2 ACB: Challenger Mk. 2 whose glass-reinforced plastic "wet" charge bins have been replaced by steel Armoured Charge Bins (ACB) as part of the Operation Granby.
- Challenger 1 Mk. 3: equipped with armoured charge bins and a number of hull modifications. 156 tanks built between December 1986 and June 1990.
- CTT : Challenger Training Tank (CTT), 17 purpose-built driver training tanks. The CTT was based on the Challenger 1 Mk. 3 chassis. The turret was replaced by an observation and control cabin made of cast steel.

=== Challenger Armoured Repair and Recovery Vehicle (CRARRV) ===
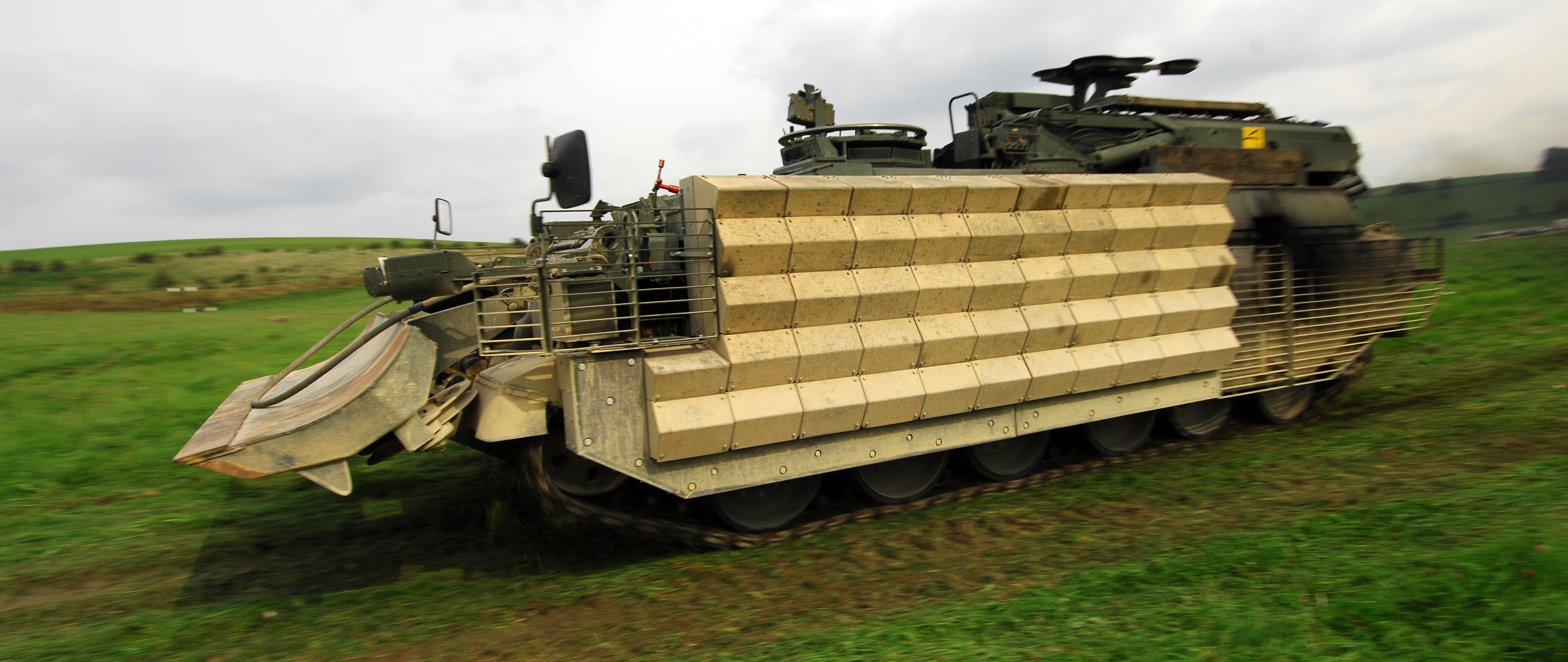
A CRARRV on exercise on Salisbury Plain in 2008

In 1985, the UK MoD ordered a derivative armoured recovery vehicle from Vickers Defence on the Challenger 1 hull. Eighty vehicles were delivered to the British between 1988 and 1993, with four more later delivered to Oman.

CRARRVs have subsequently been upgraded to use the updated Challenger 2 powertrain consisting of a CV12-5C/6C engine with TN54E transmission.

CRARRVs were first deployed in action to support Challenger 1 tanks in the lead up to the First Gulf War, Operation Granby in 1991. They were subsequently deployed during the 2003 invasion of Iraq, Operation Telic in 2003.

An unspecified number of CRARRVs are to be donated to Ukraine alongside a squadron of Challenger 2 tanks in 2023.

== Operators ==
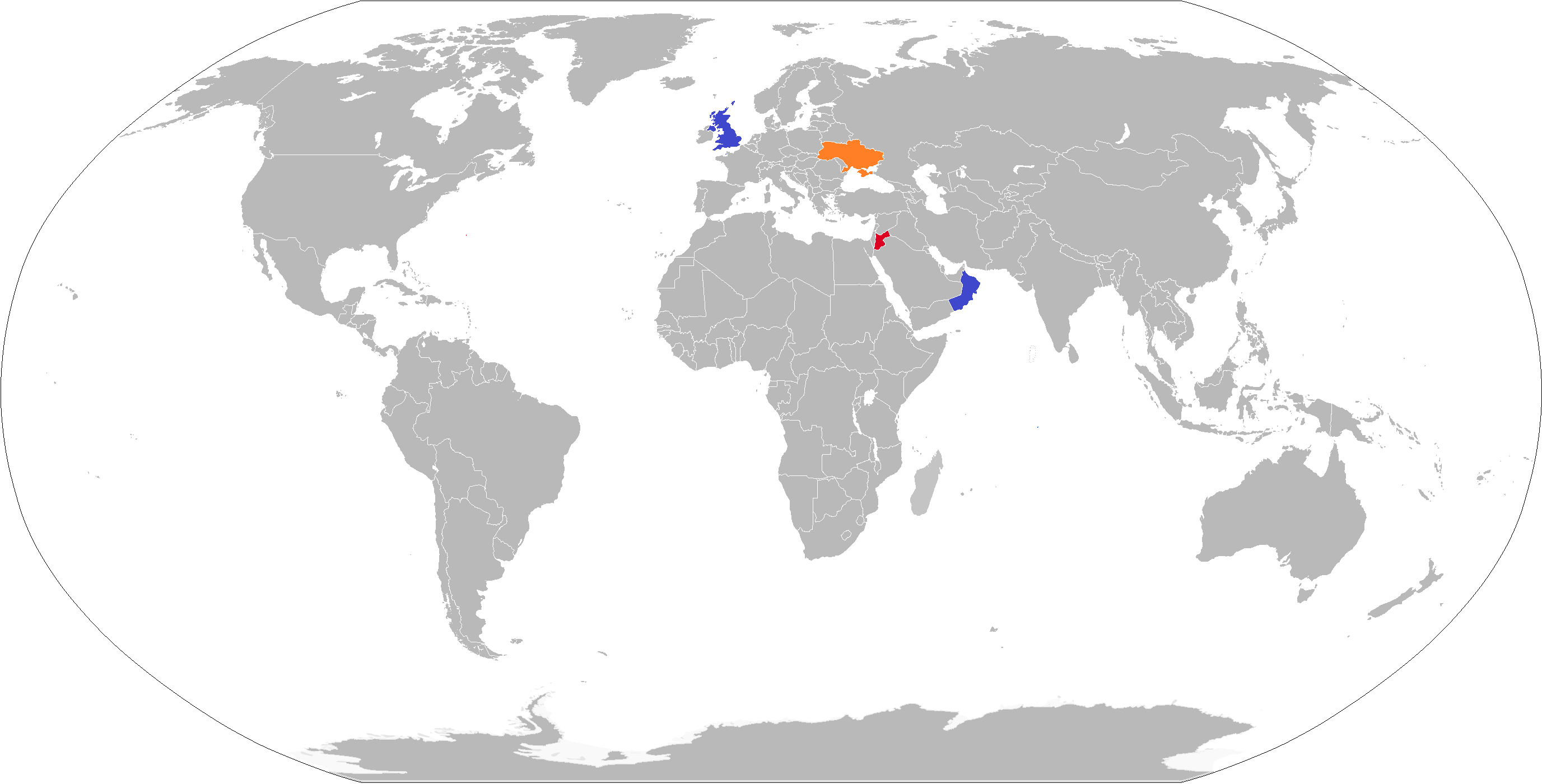
Map of Challenger 1 operators Current operators of CRARRV Future operators of CRARRV Former operators of Challenger 1

=== Current operators ===
==== CRARRV ====
- United Kingdom - 80 in service, subsequently received Challenger 2 powertrain upgrades.
- Oman - 4 in service.

=== Future operators ===
==== CRARRV ====
- (Ukraine) Ukrainian Army - two were donated alongside a squadron of 14 Challenger 2 tanks.

=== Former operators ===
- United Kingdom - 420 in service until replaced by Challenger 2 by 2001.
- Jordan - 402 tanks delivered, King Abdullah II Design and Development Bureau upgraded Jordanian Challengers and have become known as Al-Hussein. Multiple local variants. Now phased out of service and replaced by 141 ex-Italian Army Centauro 8x8 wheeled tank destroyers, ex-German Marder 1A3 Infantry Fighting Vehicles, and ex-Emirati Leclerc tanks.

== See also ==
- List of main battle tanks by generation
