= Falcon Heights =

Falcon Heights is the name of some places in the United States:

- Falcon Heights, Minnesota
- Falcon Heights, Oregon
- Falcon Heights, Texas
