= Falcon Turret =

Jordanian low-profile main battle tank turret

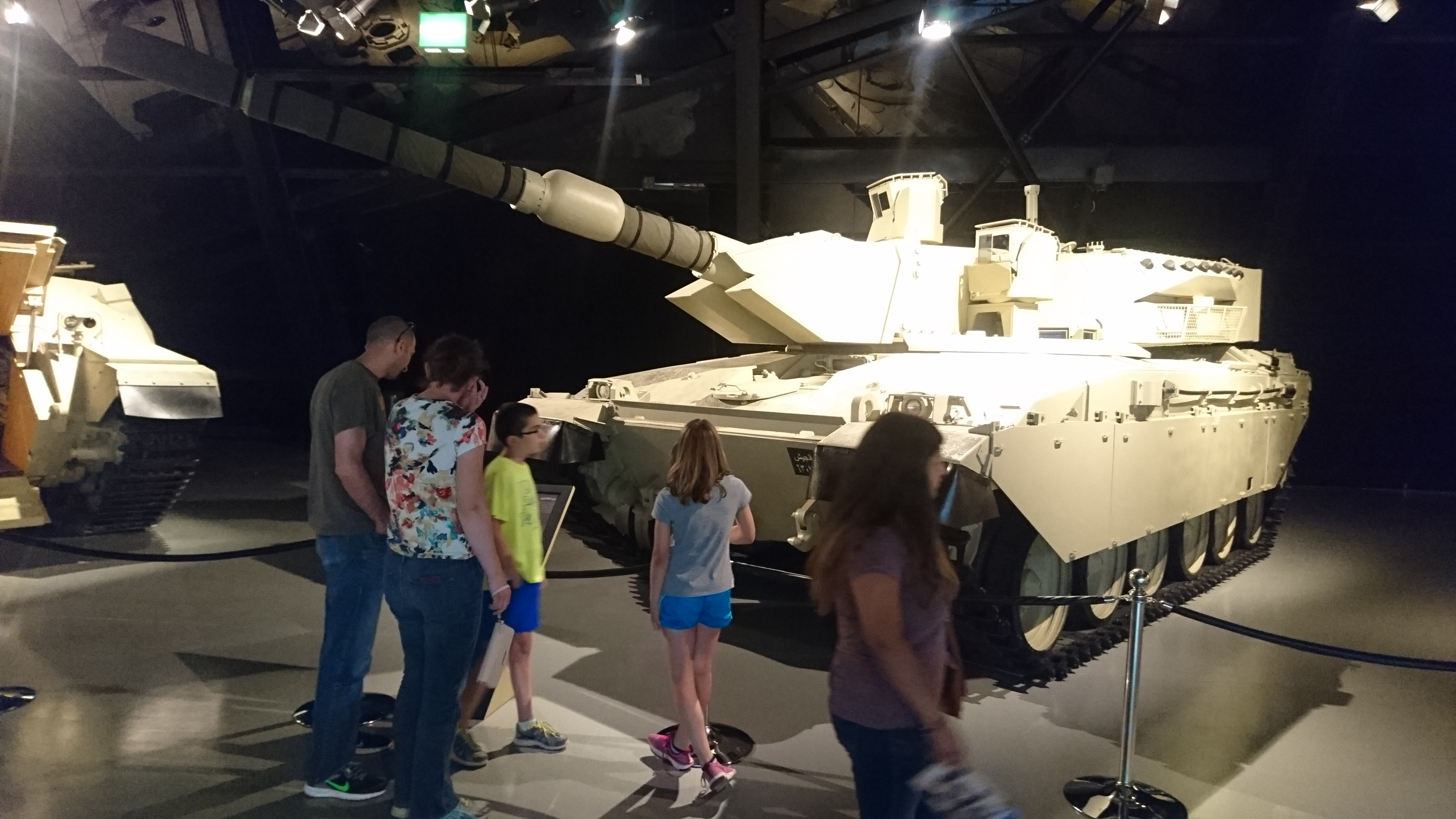
- Type: Main battle tank

Service history
- In service: 2003-present (Jordan)
- Wars: None

Production history
- Designer: King Abdullah Design and Development Bureau (KADDB)
- Designed: 2003?
- No. built: Undisclosed

Specifications
- Crew: 2 (Commander, Gunner)
- Armor: Chobham, classified
- Main armament: RUAG Defense Systems 120-mm / L50 smoothbore gun
- Secondary armament: coaxial 7.62-mm machine gun

The Falcon Turret is a low-profile main battle tank turret under development by King Abdullah II Design and Development Bureau in Jordan, with technical assistance from South Africa.

Featuring an autoloader and capable of mounting the current RUAG Defense Systems GTC 120mm smoothbore gun, the turret was supposed to be fitted to Jordan's Challenger 1 (though it was decided to phase out the Challengers altogether) and other main battle tanks, and to be available for export. Operating similarly to a remote weapon station, it enables all crew to be located inside the tank hull rather than the turret, giving the vehicle a lower profile and the crew added protection.
