= Falcón Municipality, Falcón =

Falcón Municipality Municipio Falcón
- Municipality
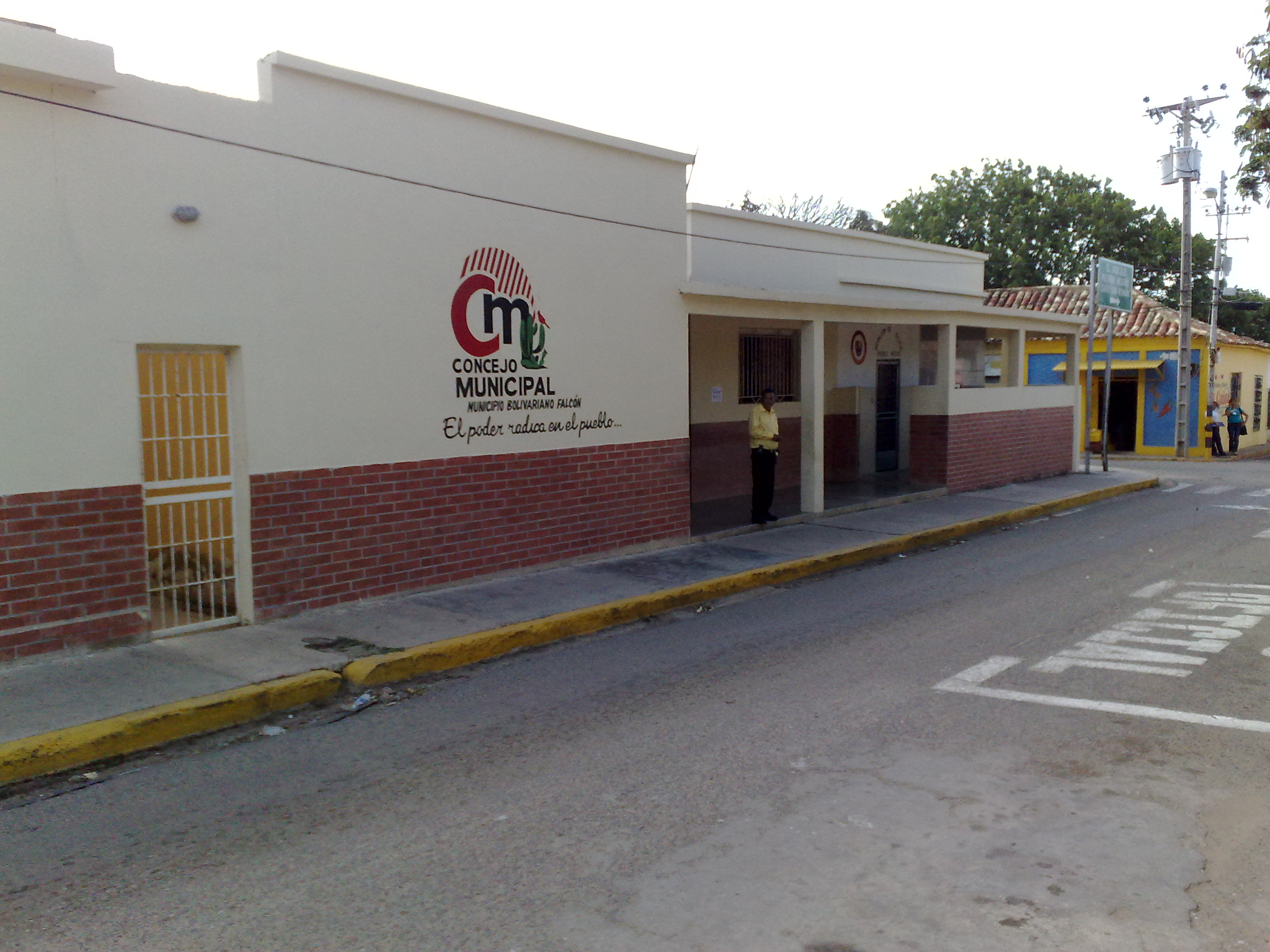
- City council of the municipality of Falcón

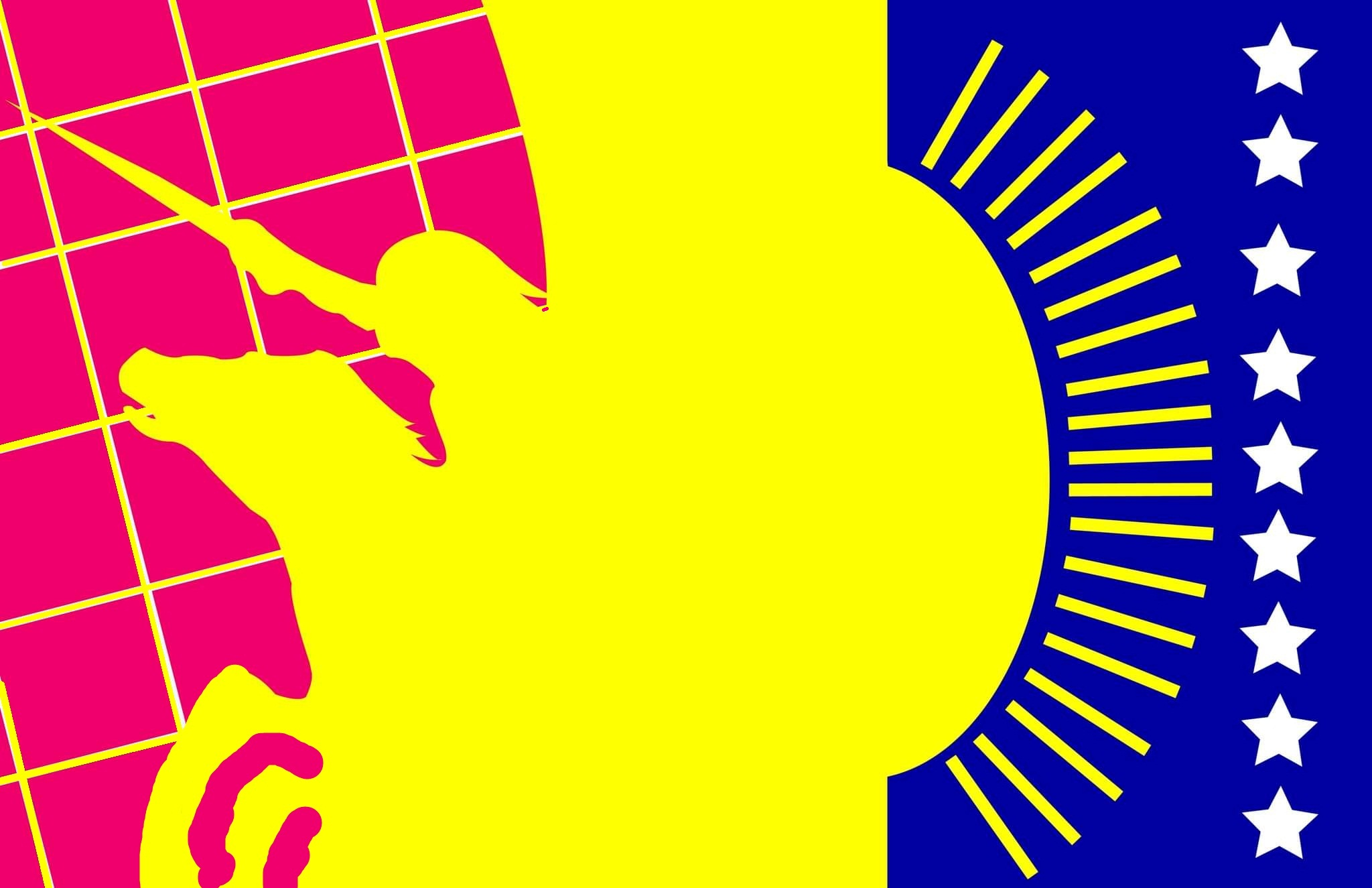
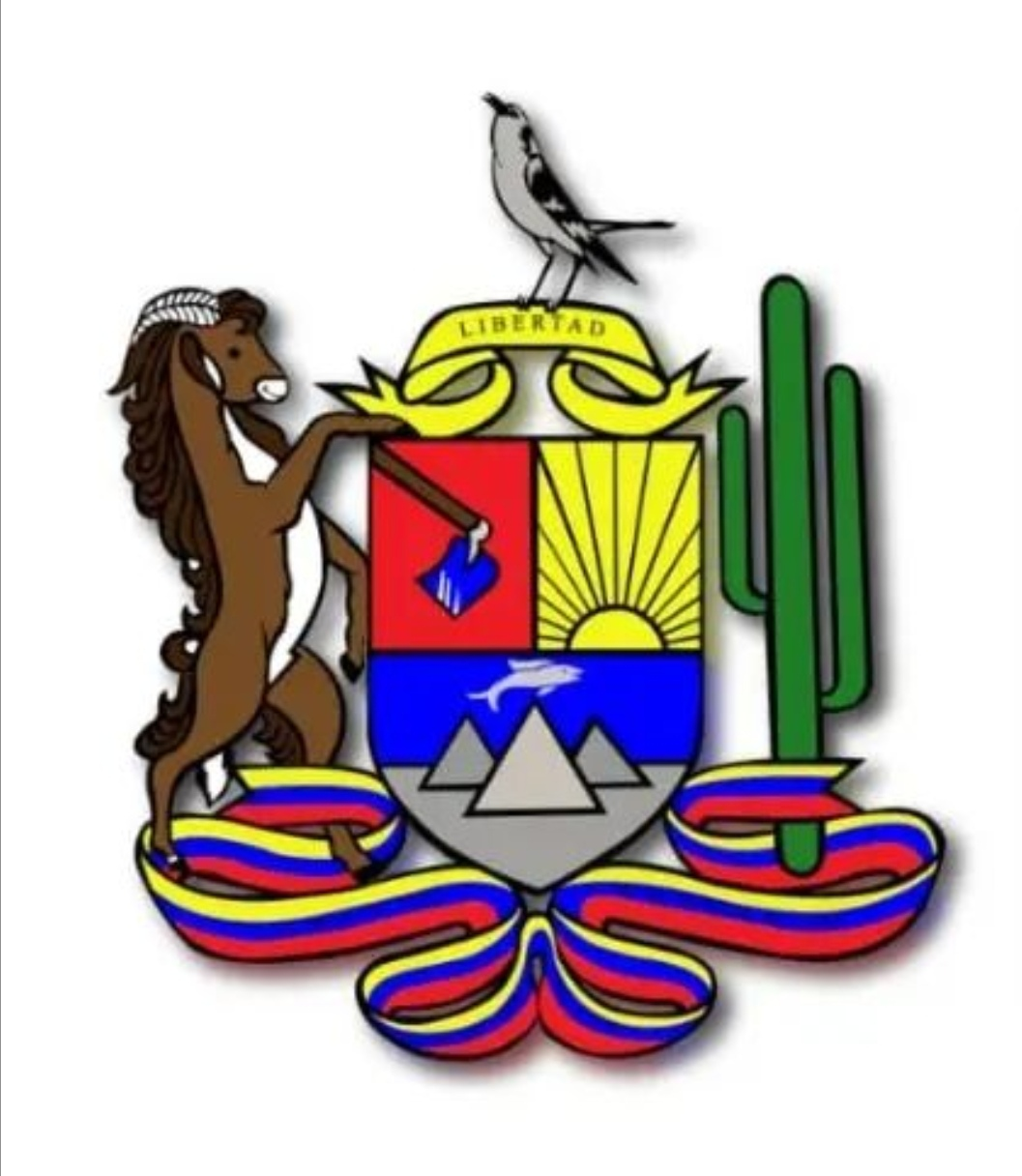
- Flag Coat of arms

- Location in Falcón

- Location in Venezuela
- Coordinates: 11°55′23″N 69°56′52″W
- Country: Venezuela
- State: Falcón
- Municipal seat: Pueblo Nuevo[*]

Area
  - Total: 1,829.8 km^{2} (706.5 sq mi)
- Time zone: UTC−4 (VET)
- Website: Official website

Falcón Municipality is a municipality in Falcón State, Venezuela.

== Administrative divisions ==
- El Hato
- Adaure
- Jadacaquiva
- El Vínculo
- Adícora
- Baraived
- Moruy
- Buena Vista
- Pueblo Nuevo, Falcón, municipal seat of Falcón Municipality
