= Detroit Falcons =

Detroit Falcons can refer to:

- Detroit Falcons (NHL), former name (used from 1930 to 1932) for the Detroit Red Wings of the National Hockey League
- Detroit Falcons (basketball), defunct team in the Basketball Association of America (1946–1947)
- Detroit Falcons (NAHL), defunct junior team in the North American Junior Hockey League (1986–1987)
- Detroit Falcons (CoHL), defunct team in the Colonial Hockey League (1991–1996)
