= Falcon Lake =

Falcon Lake may refer to:

- Falcon Lake (Manitoba), Canada
- Falcon International Reservoir, at Falcon Dam on the Rio Grande between Texas and Tamaulipas
- Falcon Lake (Colorado)
- Falcon Lake (Alaska)
- Falcon Lake (Washington)
- Falcon Lake (film), a 2022 coming-of-age drama film

== See also ==
- Falcon Lake Estates, Texas
- Piracy on Falcon Lake
