= Richard Ogorkiewicz =

Polish British engineer and historian

- Ryszard Marian Ogórkiewicz
- Born: May 2, 1926; Bydgoszcz, Poznań Voivodeship, Second Polish Republic
- Died: November 24, 2019 (aged 93); London, England, United Kingdom

Academic background
- Education: Imperial College London

Academic work
- Discipline: History
- Institutions: Imperial College London

Richard Marian Ogorkiewicz (2 May 1926 – 24 November 2019) was a Polish British engineer and armoured fighting vehicle historian.

== Life ==
Richard Ogorkiewicz, born Ryszard Marian Ogórkiewicz, was born in Bydgoszcz. He was a son of Polish Colonel Oberst Marian Ogórkiewicz (1898–1962). Following the invasion of Poland by Germany in 1939 his family fled first to Romania, then to France in February 1940. In May they moved to Scotland, where Richard attended school. Richard studied mechanical engineering at Imperial College London. After completing his studies, he continued to teach at Imperial. He then worked at Humber and Ford on gas turbine engines. From 1957 through 1985 he was back at Imperial and concentrated on armoured fighting vehicles. From 1972 to 2006, he was an independent member of various committees of the British Defence Scientific Advisory Council. In 1979 he became a lecturer, and from 1988 a visiting professor at the Royal Military College of Science in Shrivenham. In 1993 he became curator of the Tank Museum in Bovington.

== Works ==
Richard Ogorkiewicz has published numerous articles in journals, most notably in Jane's International Defence Review.

- Design and Development of Fighting Vehicles, 1968, ISBN 978-0356014616
- Thermoplastics: Effects of Processing, 1969, ISBN 978-0592054544
- Armoured Forces: A history of Armoured Forces and Their Vehicles, Arms and Armour Press 1970, ISBN 978-0668023344
- Engineering Properties of Plastics (Engineering Design Guides), Oxford University Press 1977, ISBN 978-0198591528
- Technology of Tanks, Jane's Information Group 1991, ISBN 978-0710605955
- Tanks: 100 years of evolution, Osprey Publishing 2015, ISBN 978-1472806703
