= USS Falcon =

USS Falcon may refer to the following ships of the United States Navy:

- USS Falcon (1846), the Mexican gunboat Isabel, captured in 1846 and taken into the Navy; decommissioned and sold, 1848;
- Falcon, a motor boat, served in a noncommissioned status in the 13th Naval District during World War I;
- USS Falcon (AM-28), a Lapwing-class minesweeper; later redesignated ASR-2;
- USS Falcon (AM-190), a Bluebird-class minesweeper; later redesignated MSC-190;
- USS Falcon (MHC-59), a Osprey-class minehunter was launched 3 June 1995 and decommissioned 30 June 2006.

== See also ==
- Falcon was the name of the Lunar Module on Apollo 15
