= Viper Falcon =

Viper Falcon is an American two-stage sounding rocket. The first stage is Viper I and the second stage is Falcon. The Viper Falcon program was started in 1960. The Viper Falcon has a ceiling of 120 kilometers (75 mi) and a length of 3.50 meters.
