= HMS Falcon (1694) =

British warship

History

England
- Name: HMS Falcon
- Ordered: 28 March 1694
- Builder: Nicholas Barret (of Wapping), Shoreham
- Launched: 28 September 1694
- Commissioned: 13 October 1694
- Captured: 10 June 1695
- Fate: Taken by French, then retaken 1703 and broken

General characteristics
- Type: 20-gun Sixth Rate
- Tons burthen: 248 27/94 bm
- Length: 91 ft 6 in (27.9 m) gundeck; 77 ft 6 in (23.6 m) keel for tonnage
- Beam: 24 ft 6.5 in (7.5 m) for tonnage
- Depth of hold: 10 ft 8 in (3.3 m)
- Armament: initially as ordered; 20 × sakers on wooden trucks (UD); 4 × 3-pdr on wooden trucks (QD); 1703 Establishment; 20 × 6-pdrs on wooden trucks (UD); 4 × 4-pdr on wooden trucks (QD)

HMS Falcon was a member of the standardized 20-gun sixth rates built at the end of the 17th century. She had a very brief career in the Royal Navy as she was captured shortly after commissioning by two French ships. She was recaptured in 1703 then broken.

Falcon was the twelfth named vessel since it was used for a ballinger dating from 1343 and sold in 1352.

== Construction ==
She was ordered in the Second Batch of eight ships to be built under contract by Nicholas Barret of Shoreham. She was launched on 28 September 1694.

== Commissioned service ==
She was commissioned on 13 October 1694 under the command of Captain Henry Middleton, RN.

== Disposition ==
HMS Falcon was taken on 10 June 1695 by the French 40-gun Le Sainte-Antoine and the 24-gun Le Tigre off Dodman Point. She was retaken by the British in 1703 and broken.
