= Falcon Records =

Falcon Records may refer to:

- Falcon Records (Texas), a record label from to 1940s to the 1980s
- Falcon Records (Canadian label), a record label in existence from 1979 to 1985
- Falcon Records (Massachusetts), a record label from Bentley University
- Falcon Records, a subsidiary of Vee-Jay records renamed Abner Records
