= Falcon Heights, Oregon =

Unincorporated community in the state of Oregon, United States

- Unincorporated community
- Location within Oregon Location within the United States
- Coordinates: 42°07′46″N 121°45′12″W
- Country: United States
- State: Oregon
- County: Klamath

Area
  - Total: 0.42 sq mi (1.08 km^{2})
  - Land: 0.42 sq mi (1.08 km^{2})
  - Water: 0 sq mi (0.00 km^{2})
- Elevation: 4,118 ft (1,255 m)

Population (2020)
  - Total: 680
  - Density: 1,628/sq mi (628.4/km^{2})
- Time zone: UTC-8 (Pacific (PST))
  - Summer (DST): UTC-7 (PDT)
- ZIP code: 97603
- Area codes: 458 and 541
- FIPS code: 41-24350
- GNIS feature ID: 2812880

Falcon Heights is an unincorporated community in Klamath County in the U.S. state of Oregon. It lies south of Klamath Falls and east of Midland along Old Midland Road. As of the 2020 census, Falcon Heights had a population of 680.

Falcon Heights is a gated community originally created by the federal government as housing for United States Air Force personnel stationed at nearby Kingsley Field. It consists of 290 housing units built in 1958, acquired by a Klamath Falls development company in 1997, and sold to individual buyers. The Falcon Heights Homeowners Association, overseen by an elected board of directors, manages the 118-acre (48 ha) community.

== Demographics ==
Historical population
Census	Pop.	Note	%±
2020	680		—
U.S. Decennial Census

== Education ==
It is within the Klamath County School District.

It is in the territory of Klamath Community College.
