= Xbox 360 technical specifications =

The Xbox 360 video game console features a port on the top when vertical (left side when horizontal) to which a custom-housed hard disk drive unit can be attached in sizes of either 20, 60, 120, 250, 320, 500 GB; (Note: GB = one billion bytes (10^{9} B)) the user can use the format option from system settings to initialize the new HDD. Inside, the Xbox 360 uses the triple-core IBM designed Xenon as its CPU, with each core capable of simultaneously processing two threads, and can therefore operate on up to six threads at once. Graphics processing is handled by the ATI Xenos, which has 10 MB of eDRAM. Its main memory pool is 512 MB (Note: MB = 1024^{2} B) in size. All games are required to support at least Dolby Digital 5.1 surround sound, and all versions of the console include a wired Ethernet network adapter.

== Central processing unit (CPU) ==
Xbox 360 took a different approach to hardware compared to its predecessor. The XCPU, named Waternoose (later Loki), is a custom triple-core 64-bit PowerPC-based design by IBM. The CPU emphasized high floating point performance through multiple FPU and SIMD vector processors in each core. The SIMD vector processor (VMX128) was modified for the Xbox to include a dot-product instruction. The dot-product instruction took far less latency than discrete instructions. The VMX128 was also modified by the addition of Direct3D (D3D) compressed data format. This led to an approximate 50 percent savings in required band-width and memory footprint making the CPU having a theoretical peak performance of 115.2 GFLOPS, being capable of 9.6 billion dot products per second. Each core of the CPU was capable of simultaneous multithreading and was clocked at 3.2 GHz. However, to reduce CPU die size, complexity, cost, and power demands, the processor used in-order execution in contrast to the Intel Coppermine 128-based Pentium III used in the original Xbox, which used more complex out-of-order execution. The original chip used a 90 nm process, although a newer 65 nm process SOI revision was implemented on later models, which was in-turn superseded by a 45 nm, then 32 nm combined CPU and GPU chip. A 21.6 GB/s front side bus, aggregated 10.8 GB/s upstream and downstream, connected Xenon with the graphics processor/northbridge. Xenon was equipped with an 8th way set associative 1 MB Level 2 cache on-die running at half CPU clock speed. This cache was shared amongst the three CPU cores. Each core had separate L1 caches, each containing a two-way set associative 32-Kbyte L1 instruction cache and a four-way set associative 32-Kbyte L1 data cache. The write-through data cache did not allocate cache lines on writes. The CPU also contained ROM storing Microsoft private encrypted keys, used to decrypt game data. The heat sink implemented to cool the Xenon CPU was composed of aluminum fins with a copper base, and a heat pipe. Newer revisions, which had a smaller core, do not feature the heat pipe or copper base. The heat sink was cooled by two 70 mm fans at the rear of the console on original-style consoles, while a single fan mounted on the side of the consoles was used in Xbox 360 S consoles. There were several types of fans used in Xbox 360s, which were produced by Nidec, Sunon, and Delta Electronics.

=== CPU data streaming ===
During read streaming into the CPU, a custom prefetch instruction, extended data cache block touch (xDCBT) prefetches data directly to the L1 data cache of the intended core, which skips putting the data in the L2 cache to avoid thrashing the L2 cache. Writes streaming from each core skip the L1 cache, due to its no-write allocation (avoids thrashing of high-bandwidth, transient, write-only data streams on the L1 cache), and goes directly to the L2 cache. The system allows for the GPU to directly read data produced by the CPU without going to main memory. In this specific case of data streaming, called Xbox procedural synthesis (XPS), the CPU is effectively a data decompressor, generating geometry on-the-fly for consumption by the GPU 3D core.

== Graphics processing unit (GPU) ==
While the first Xbox's graphics processing unit was produced by Nvidia, the Xbox 360 had a chip designed by ATI called Xenos (later Gunga). The chip was developed under the name "C1" and "R500" was often used to refer to it. The GPU package contains two separate silicon dies, each built on a 90 nm process with a clock speed of 500 MHz; the GPU proper, manufactured by TSMC and a 10 MB eDRAM daughter-die, manufactured by NEC. Thanks to the daughter die, the Xenos can do 4× MSAA, z-buffering, and alpha blending with no appreciable performance penalty on the GPU. The GPU also houses additional capabilities typically separated into a motherboard chipset in PC systems, effectively replacing the northbridge chip. It has a theoretical peak of 240 GFLOPS. Early models of the GPU had reliability issues. This was fixed around mid 2008.

== Memory and system bandwidth ==
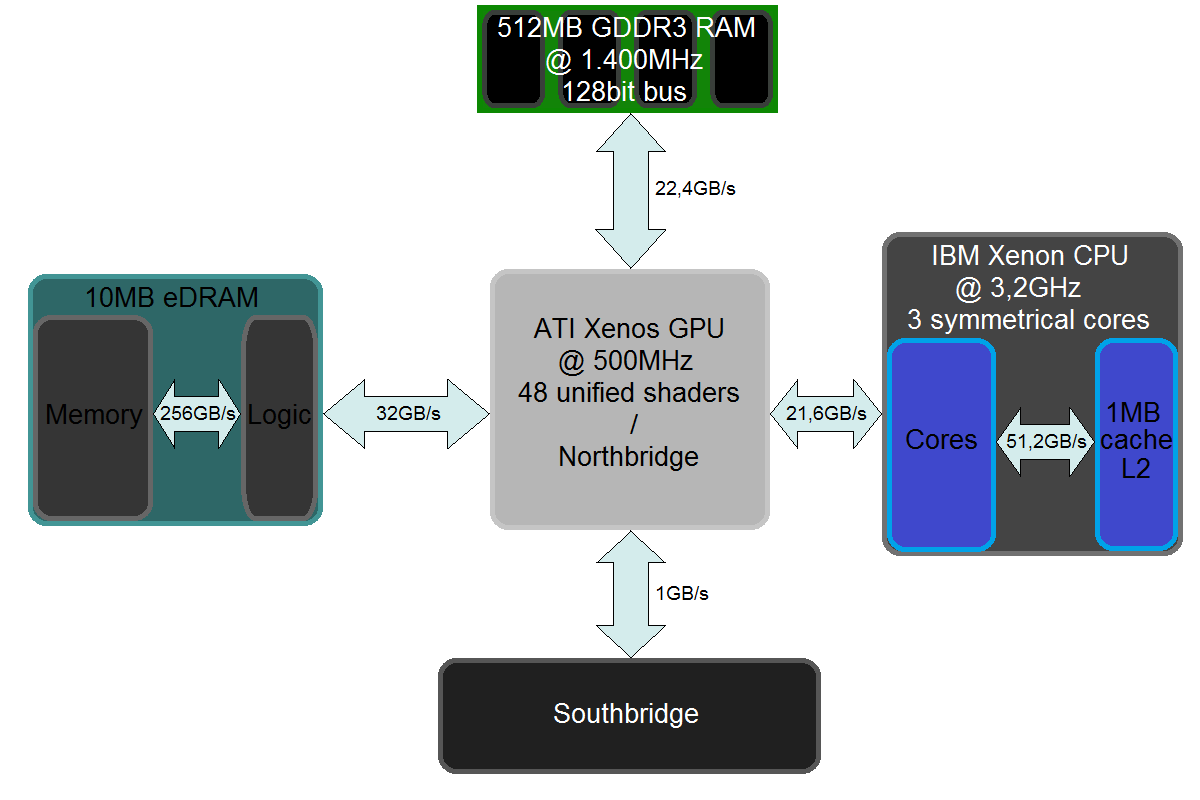
Xbox 360 bandwidth and hardware scheme

The console features 512 MB of GDDR3 RAM clocked at 700 MHz with an effective transmission rate of 1.4 GHz on a 128-bit bus. The memory is shared by the CPU and the GPU via the unified memory architecture. This memory is produced by either Samsung or Qimonda.

According to Mark Rein of Epic Games, Microsoft had originally planned on using only 256 MB of RAM, but the decision to increase it was based on Epic's upcoming Gears of War title. Epic had been arguing for Microsoft to increase the memory for some time, and Tim Sweeney had sent Microsoft screenshots of what Gears would look like at 256 MB, and then at their proposed 512 MB. Mark Rein further claimed that Epic Games was the first studio to be told of the new 512 MB memory specification in a phone call with the chief financial officer of Microsoft Game Studios, with the CFO claiming the change would cost a billion dollars, Rein replied that the new specification was better for gamers.

The Xbox 360 has an extensive amount of bandwidth in comparison to its competition; however, this statistic includes the eDRAM logic to memory bandwidth, and not internal CPU bandwidths. The eDRAM internal logic to its internal memory bandwidth is 256 GB/s. The high bandwidth is used primarily for z-buffering, alpha blending, and antialiasing; it saves time and space on the GPU die. Between the eDRAM die and the GPU, data is transferred at 32 GB/s. The memory interface bus has a bandwidth of 22.40 GB/s and the Southbridge a bandwidth of 0.5 GB/s.

== Audio and video ==
All games made for the Xbox 360 are required to support at least Dolby Digital 5.1 surround sound. Sound files for games are encoded using Microsoft's XMA audio format. An MPEG-2 decoder is included for DVD video playback. VC-1 or WMV is used for streaming video and other video is compressed using VC-1 at non-HD NTSC and PAL resolutions or WMV HD. The Xbox 360 also supports H.263 and H.264 MPEG-4 videos. Unlike the original Xbox, voice communication is handled by the console, not by the game code, allowing for cross-game communication. There is no voice echo to game players on the same console; voice only goes to remote consoles.

Initially there were no digital video outputs such as DVI or HDMI on the Xbox 360; instead, HD-quality output could only be produced over YP_{B}P_{R} component video (used by both the 3 RCA component cable and the Japanese D-terminal cable) and later VGA (via a software update). An HDMI port was introduced to the Xbox 360 by July 2007 with the introduction of the Elite model. A wide array of SDTV and HDTV resolutions are supported by the console hardware; up to 1080p after the October 2006 software upgrade. While most games are rendered natively at 720p, the video from all games can be scaled by the hardware to whatever resolution the user has set in the console's settings; from 480i NTSC and 576i PAL all the way to 1080p HDTV.

== DVD storage ==
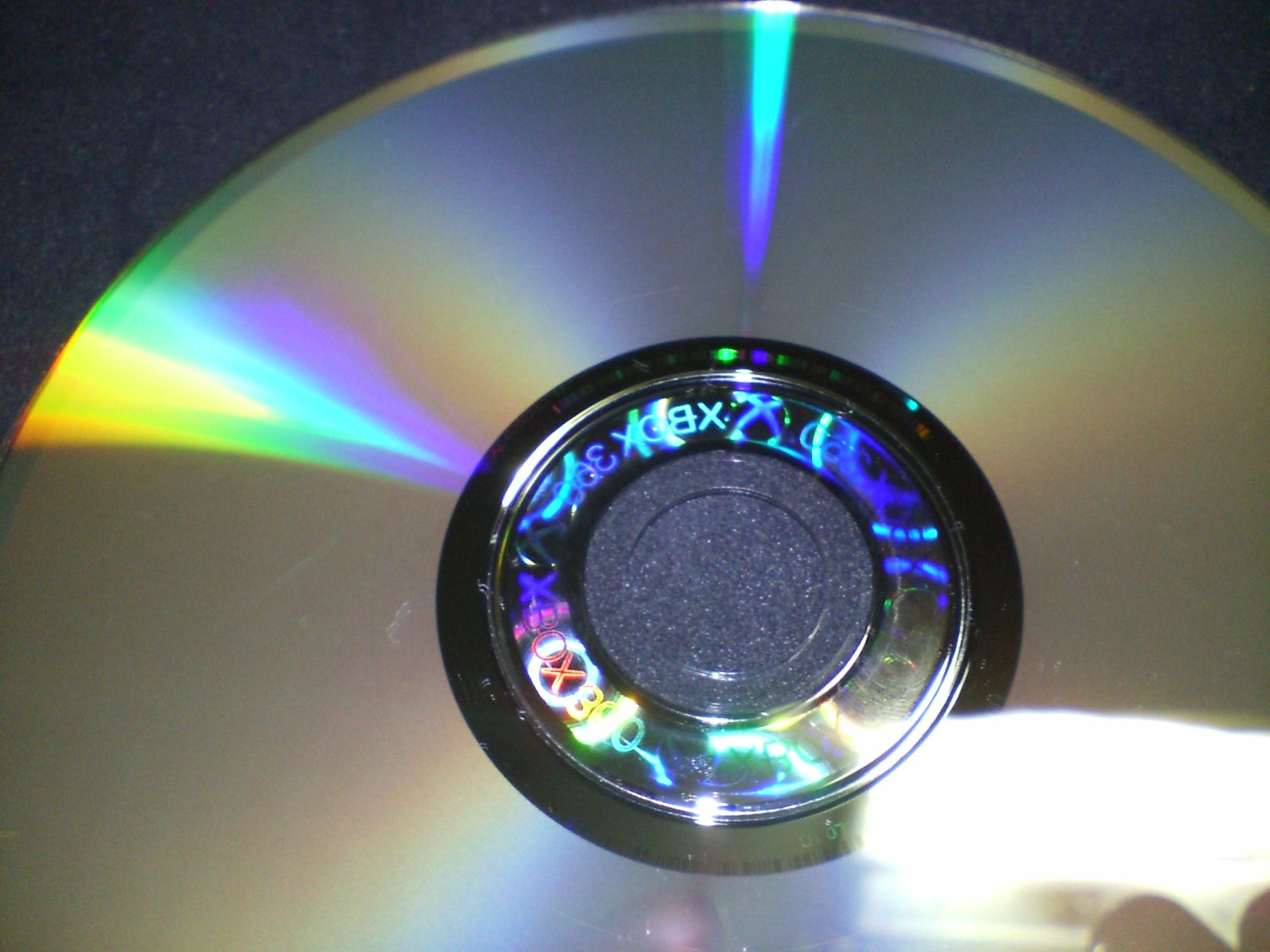
DVD-ROM for Xbox 360

Xbox 360 is equipped with a 12× DVD drive, with a data transfer rate of 16.5 MB/s. The original production DVD drives were manufactured by LG, Samsung, and Sony. Beginning in November 2006, a new model the BenQ VAD6038 was introduced, which is said to run faster than the previous models and, in addition, is much quieter. There is a new drive by LiteOn.

Games are stored on standard 8.5 GB dual-layer DVD-ROMs; however initially only 7.3 GB (6.8 GiB) were allocated to be used for games on the "Xbox Game Disc 2" (XGD2) early format. With the XGD3 later format introduced in 2011, the usable space was brought up to 8.3 GB (7.8 GiB). This marked an increase in available space for games from 85% to nearly 98%. In both formats, the unallocated space for games is used for anti-piracy security software.

The option to apply a regional lockout to games is available to publishers, although DVD region codes are always enforced for movies. Microsoft has implemented methods to prevent hacking through the drive. Later drive models have the external debug triggering removed and black hard glue added to cover all the chip and controller pins. The drive is able to read both DVD±R and DVD±RW in addition to being able to play DVD-Video out of the box, unlike its predecessor, which required the purchase of an add-on remote. The system is also capable of playing standard CDs along with CD-R/RW, CD-DA, CD-ROM XA, CD-Extra, WMA-CD, MP3-CD, and JPEG Photo CD. Some users reported problems with the disc drive, as when a user changes the console's orientation, the inserted disc may brush against the drive's pickup assembly and incur scratches to it. The users manual advises against changing the console's position while there is a disc in the drive. Other users report experiencing disc scratching during normal horizontal usage.

Announced at CES 2006 and first publicly shown at E3 2006, an external HD DVD drive was released in North America on November 7, 2006 (for US$199.99) and in Japan on November 17, 2006 (for ¥19,800). In the UK, France and Germany, the HD DVD drive was released for €199.99/£129.99. The HD DVD drive was bundled for a limited time with an Xbox 360 Universal Media Remote, as well as an HD DVD copy of Peter Jackson's King Kong. The drive plays HD DVD movies, although all Xbox 360 games will remain on the DVD format. Microsoft had no plans to include an internal HD DVD player in future Xbox 360 designs. The drive connects to the Xbox 360 via USB and contains two integrated USB ports on the rear. Games can not be played on the HD DVD drive. Microsoft has since discontinued the HD DVD add-on since the format was officially dropped by Toshiba.

=== List of DVD drives ===
Manufacturer(s)	Model	Firmware version(s)	Notes
Toshiba-Samsung	TS-H943	MS25; MS28	
Hitachi-LG	GDR-3120L	0032; 0036; 0040; 0046; 0047; 0058; 0059; 0078; 0079FL/FK	
Hitachi-LG	DL10N (Xbox 360 S)	0500AA	
Philips & BenQ (PBDS)	VAD6038	62430C; 64930C; 04421C	New FW after System Update 2.0.13146.0 version. (04421C)
Philips & Lite-On (PLDS)	DG-16D2S	74850C; 83850C v1 83850C v2 93450C; 02510C	New FW after System Update 2.0.13146.0 version. (02510C)
Philips & Lite-On (PLDS)	DG-16D4S (Xbox 360 S)	9504; 0225; 0401; 0272; 1071; 1214	New FW after System Update 2.0.13146.0 version. (9504 → 0272)
Philips & Lite-On (PLDS)	DG-16D5S (Xbox 360 S)	A445; 1175; 1532	

== Hard drive storage ==
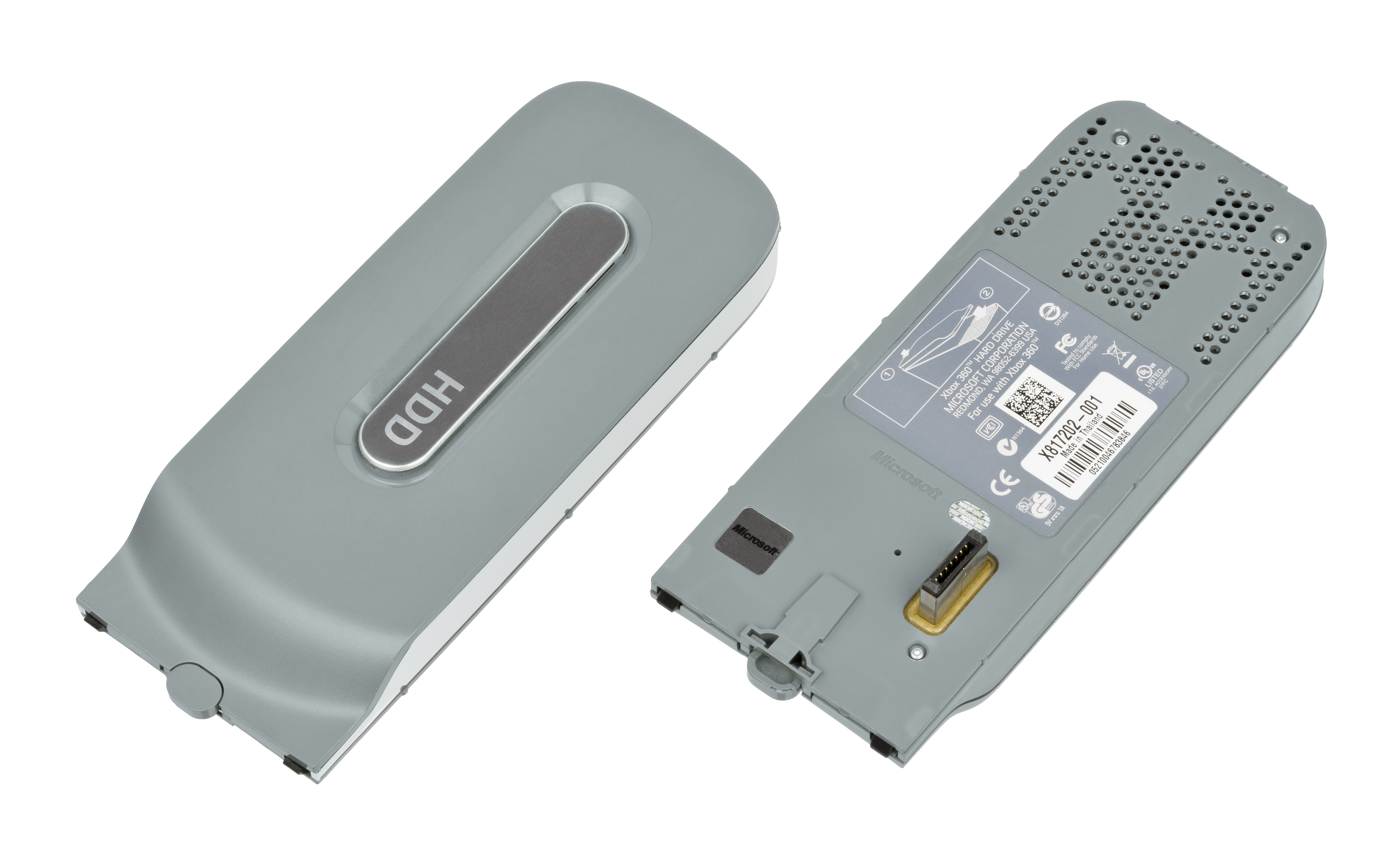
Original style Xbox 360 hard drives

The Xbox 360 uses standard 2.5" SATA hard disk drives (HDDs) held within custom enclosures. These units have a custom connector to facilitate connection to the Xbox 360 and the drives themselves feature custom firmware (making stand-alone drives incompatible). The drives are detachable, making it possible to move data from one console to another, and to upgrade the size of drive on a console. The hard drives themselves are manufactured by various companies, including Fujitsu, Seagate, Samsung, Hitachi and Western Digital. Certain Western Digital hard disk drives can be modified with a program called HDDHackr to be used with the Xbox 360.

Approximately 7 GB are reserved for system use (4 GB of that portion are reserved for game title caching and other hard drive specific elements in games that support the hard drive, and an additional 2 GB are reserved for use by the Xbox 360 backwards-compatibility software). The original Pro configuration of the system came with a 20 GB hard drive, which was also available to purchase separately (for the Core model, and later the Arcade model, which did not include a HDD). This was upgraded to 60 GB in September 2008, and the 60 GB HDD was also made available at retail. In April 2007, Microsoft released the Elite console, which included a black 120 GB HDD; a grey 120 GB drive was also later made available at retail. In November 2009, Microsoft released the "Super Elite" console, as a bundle with the highly anticipated game Call of Duty: Modern Warfare 2. This console was like the typical black Elite, but with Call of Duty graphics added and for the first time included a 250 GB hard drive (which holds up to 228 GB of data after system information is stored). This was followed by various other 250 GB special/limited edition bundles. No standard (non-special edition) configuration of the original console ever included a 250 GB drive, but they were later made available at retail.

In June 2010, Microsoft announced a new version of the console, the Xbox 360 S, which used a new form factor for its 250 GB hard drives. As such, original style hard drives cannot be used in Xbox 360 S consoles, and vice versa, without modification. In June 2011, Microsoft announced a specially branded Gears of War 3 Limited Collector's Edition Xbox 360 S console to coincide with the launch of Gears of War 3. At 320 GB, the included hard drive is the largest available for/with the original Xbox 360 model.

In August 2014, Microsoft announced and released a new 500 GB hard drive for the Xbox 360 S console model, currently the largest hard drive available for or with any Xbox 360 model.

== Networking ==
All versions of the Xbox 360 come with a built-in 10 to 100 Mbit/s wired Ethernet network adapter. The "Xbox 360 Wireless Adapter" (identifiable as white with one antenna) connects via a USB port and adds support for 802.11a and 802.11b/g Wi-Fi. This was replaced by the "Wireless N Adapter" (black with two antennas), which added support for 802.11n on both the 2.4 GHz and 5 GHz bands. The original Xbox 360 model features a pair of notches on the rear of the console, above the USB socket, to which the adapter can be attached. Alternatively, a pair of fold-out feet on the adapter can be used to stand it up separately.

The Xbox 360 S and Xbox 360 E consoles feature built-in support for 802.11b/g/n but on the 2.4 GHz band only. The Wireless and Wireless N Adapters can be used on these models to add support for the 5 GHz band (albeit the former losing support for 802.11n over 2.4 GHz) and will, in some cases, offer "... better range and bandwidth compared with the internal wireless feature ..." If this adapter is connected, the internal wireless adapter is disabled. The S and E models lack the notches for the adapter.

== Motherboards ==
Microsoft avoids outright announcements of new motherboard production runs and their subsequent appearance in the market in part due to uneven distribution causing buyer's remorse and to prevent purchaser delay. However, several major (and many minor) motherboard revisions are introduced to reduce costs and to allow them to run cooler while consuming less power. Note that there is no clear divide between the appearance of motherboard revisions in retail. Due to individual stock production, distribution and rotation, it may become difficult to find specific versions.

The power connectors on the back of these systems incorporate a "keying" system that will prevent plugging a (newer) lower-rated power supply into an older system (which needs more power). The keying system does, however, allow older power supplies to be connected to newer systems, as this poses no problem. The initial motherboard version was known as "Xenon" and used a 203 watt power supply, and lacked an HDMI video port. Later models had an improved GPU heatsink. The "Zephyr" revision was a redesigned motherboard adding the HANA (Note: Video output and system control chip.) and HDMI, and uses a newer version of the 90 nm CPU used on "Xenon". Originally "Zephyr_A" used the same 90 nm GPU as Xenon, but later "Zephyr_B" and "Zephyr_C" revisions introduced updated 90 nm GPUs. The "Falcon" incorporated a newer 65 nm CPU, and required less power so it came packaged with a 175 watt power supply. "Jasper" (released late November 2008) used both a 65 nm CPU and GPU, as well as 16, 256 or 512 MB of on-board flash memory. (This was to help run a then-recent Dashboard update. Without the addition of this internal memory, a hard disk drive or memory card is required.) The "Elpis" revision was made by repairing "Xenon" motherboards by installing a modified version of the "Rhea" GPU, (also codenamed "Elpis") from later reliable "Falcon" boards, in order to fix the RROD permanently. The "Jasper" revision required even less power due to a new 65 nm GPU (but still with a 90 nm eDRAM), and so the power supply was also reduced to 150 watts. The "Tonasket" revision is a minor upgrade of the "Jasper", moving to a new "Kronos" GPU with a 65 nm eDRAM, and adding a new Ring of Light/RF board called "XFreedom". The GPU heatsink returned to the original one used on the "Xenon". Xbox 360 S introduced a new motherboard version called "Trinity" with a 45 nm integrated CPU, GPU, and eDRAM, codename "Vejle" (incorrectly reported as Valhalla). It consisted of 2 dies, one for the XCGPU, and one for the eDRAM. In 2011 a second model of the Xbox 360 S motherboard has been released known as "Corona" which integrates the HANA chip into the southbridge chip, and used either the traditional 16 MB NAND, or a 4 GB "Phison" eMMC. "Corona" was used in both the Xbox 360 S and Xbox 360 E. Later "Waitsburg" and "Stingray" (E model) revisions were minor changes to "Corona". In August 2014, the "Winchester" model was released, with a new XCGPU. This chip removes the heatspreader and integrated the eDRAM into the main die on the XCGPU. This version also patches the "Reset Glitch Hack".

=== List of revisions ===
Codename	CPU	GPU	eDRAM	HDMI	Power Supply	Date Released	Notes
Xenon	90 nm	90 nm	90 nm	No	203 W	November 2005	Original release. Later models had an improved GPU heatsink.
Zephyr	90 nm	90 nm	90 nm	1.2	203 W	April 2007	Redesigned motherboard. Introduced HDMI port and HANA chip. Improved GPU heatsink starting with "Zephyr_B" model.
Falcon	65 nm	90 nm	90 nm	1.2	175 W	September 2007	Introduced 65 nm CPU. Different CPU heatsink.
Opus	65 nm	90 nm	90 nm	No	175 W	July 2008	Briefly used as a replacement for Xenon motherboards which were sent to Microsoft for RROD repair. Same as Falcon, but has HDMI port removed and a custom A/V port.
Jasper	65 nm	65 nm	90 nm	1.2	150 W	November 2008	Introduced 65 nm GPU. Introduced updated PSB Southbridge. Introduced 256 MB and later 512 MB NANDs in Arcade models.
Elpis	90 nm	90 nm	90 nm	No	203 W	Mid 2009	Used as a replacement for Xenon motherboards which were sent to Microsoft for RROD repair. Same as Xenon, but with an updated GPU.
Tonasket	65 nm	65 nm	65 nm	1.2	150 W	September 2009	Introduced 65 nm eDRAM with new Kronos GPU revision. Introduced new "XFreedom" RF-module. Returned to original GPU heatsink.
Trinity	45 nm (combined chip)		65 nm	1.2	135 W	June 2010	Motherboard redesign used in the Xbox 360 S. Combined CPU/GPU into XCGPU. Some versions had a 4 GB daughterboard.
Corona	45 nm (combined chip)		65 nm	1.2	120 W	August 2011	Removes the HANA chip and merges its functionality with the updated KSB Southbridge. Used in the Xbox 360 S. Two versions: one with 4 GB Phison MMC solution, one with standard 16 MB NAND.
Waitsburg	45 nm (combined chip)		65 nm	1.2	120 W	Early 2012	Removed POST_OUT traces from the CPU. Used in the Xbox 360 S. Two versions: one with 4 GB eMMC, one with standard 16 MB NAND.
Stingray	45 nm (combined chip)		65 nm	1.2	120 W	June 2013	Waitsburg slightly modified for use in the Xbox 360 E. Used in the Xbox 360 E. Two versions: one with 4 GB eMMC, one with standard 16 MB NAND.
Winchester	32 nm (combined chip)			1.2	120 W	August 2014	New XCGPU combining eDRAM into main die. Significant board simplifcation. It patches "Reset Glitch Hack". Released with 500 GB console bundles.

== Connectivity to accessories ==
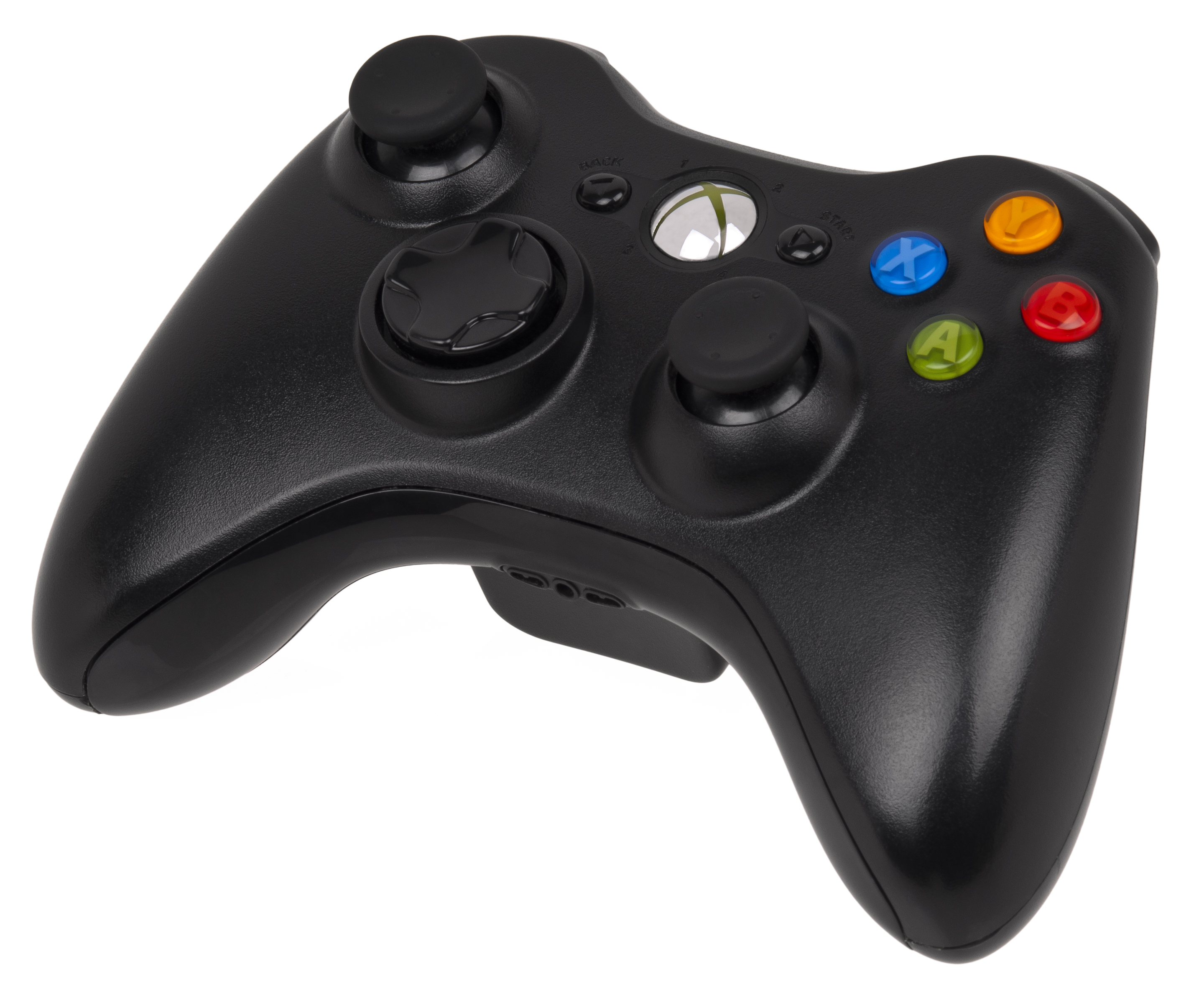
An Xbox 360 Wireless Controller

The Xbox 360 features three USB 2.0 ports (two on the front, one on the back). The Xbox 360 S, however, has five USB 2.0 ports (two on the front, three in the back) along with a dedicated Kinect port. The Xbox 360 E has four ports (two on the front, two on the back) and a dedicated Kinect port. These are used for connection of accessories such as wired controllers, the wireless networking adapter, the Xbox Live Vision camera and USB storage devices. Although the number of wired controllers is limited by the number of ports, up to four may be used through the use of a USB hub.

The Xbox 360 also features wireless connectivity of accessories via a proprietary 2.4 GHz radio system. This is mainly used to connect the official wireless controllers, but is also used for other devices such as the wireless racing wheel and wireless headsets. With the exception of some rhythm game controllers, and the Fanatec CSR wheel, this wireless connectivity is limited to first-party Microsoft accessories. The console can connect to Xbox Live over the Internet through a variety of networking interfaces.

Original style consoles also have two front-mounted memory card slots for the system's proprietary Memory Unit. These can be used to transfer profile and game data from one Xbox 360 to another. Memory Units up to 512 MB are available from Microsoft. The "Arcade" model formerly came with a 256 MB Memory Unit, but with the Jasper motherboard revision of September 2008, the "Arcade" model began to include 256 MB of built-in flash memory. This was later increased to 512 MB. The memory card slots were replaced with USB ports on the newer Xbox 360 S models.

The Universal Media Remote can be used to control several functions of the console, including the Windows Media Center functions if connected to the network. It communicates with the console via infrared through a receiver port on the front of the console. All standard controllers for the system feature a 2.5 mm headset jack to allow the use of wired headsets for voice chatting. The 2.5mm jack can also accept the chatpad accessory. Various other accessories for the console exist, such as decorative faceplates to change the physical appearance of the console.

== Physical appearance ==
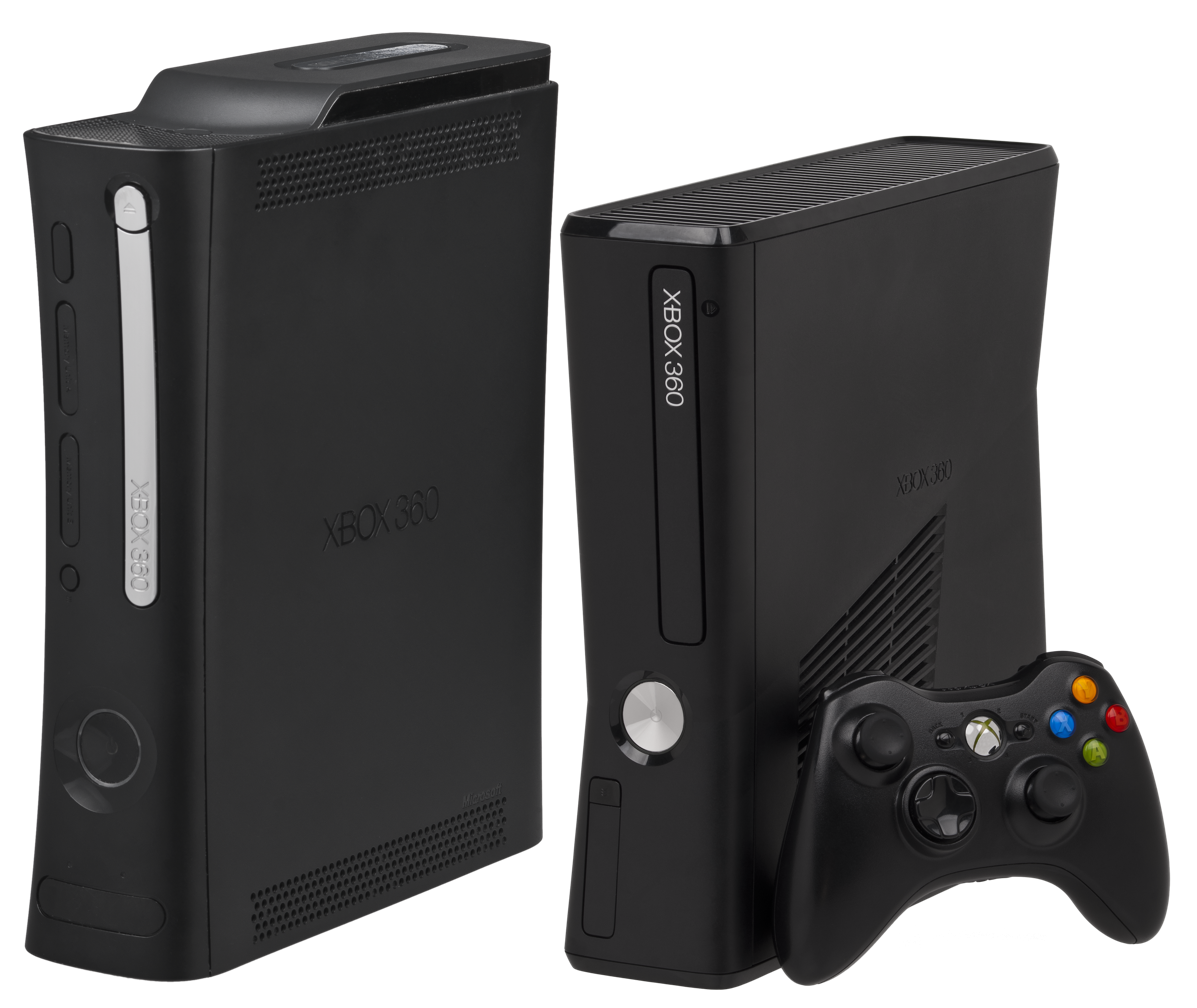
Xbox 360 Elite (left) and Xbox 360 S with new-style controller (right)

The physical outline of the original style Xbox 360 is 31 by 8 by 26.8 centimetres (12.2 in × 3.1 in × 10.6 in) and is similar in form factor to its predecessor. It is slightly slimmer in every dimension and is slightly concave, while the original Xbox was noticeably convex.

It comes as standard in either black or white, with other colors available as special editions. It was designed by Astro Studios in cooperation with Hers Experimental Design Laboratory. The original case has a concaveness to it; Astro Studios' president Brett Lovelady said that part of this was to keep an "X" shape to the console when looked at from the front, while it also served to help with cooling the system components, as the narrower section helped the console to "inhale" more air, particularly when placed in the vertical orientation.

In June 2010 a redesign of the console, known as the Xbox 360 S, was announced. This version of the console retains the same basic shape but is noticeably smaller and more angular than the original version. It comes as standard in either matte or glossy black; like its predecessor, other colors are available as special editions.

The front of the console features a "ring of light" that displays four illuminated quadrants in either red or green (Some special editions replaced the green for blue). When the lights turn red, the console has encountered an error, with the number of sectors illuminated informing the user what category the error falls into. Since the redesign of the console removed the red LEDs, this error reporting system is no longer used.

The original Xbox 360 weighs approximately 3.5 kilograms (7.7 lb), about 350 grams heavier than the new Xbox. The new version weighs in at 2.9 kilograms (6.4 lb).

=== Power supply ===
The console uses an external power supply with a 10 A/100–120 V or 5 A/220-230 V (AC) input and DC output rated at 203/175/150/130/115 W (depending on revision). An estimated 2 W of power are used while the older versions of console are in standby mode giving a yearly usage of approximately 17.5 kWh. The new version uses around 0.5W while in standby. Saving the console size and weight, the power supply displaces 1,300 cubic centimetres (79 cu in). Xbox 360 power supplies are designed with keys in the plug to be forwards, but not backwards compatible. For example, a 203 watt supply would fit and work on a 175 watt console, but not the other way around.

== See also ==
- Xbox 360 technical problems
