= Rafael Lasso de la Vega =

Spanish poet (1890-1959)

Rafael Lasso de la Vega Iglesias, alias marqués de Villanova (February 1890 Seville - 1959 Spain) was a Spanish modernist poet. He collaborated with the creationist movement, the ultraist movement and the review Ultra. He lived for a long time in Florence where he was a friend of the Italian hermetic poets.

== Works ==
- Rimas de silencio y soledad (1910)
- "Las coronas de mirto" (1914)
- "Breviario sentimental" (1914)
- Prestigios (1916)
- "Las natividades" (1917)
- Presencias (1918)
- El corazón iluminado y otros poemas (1919)
- Galería de espejos (1919)
- "Creacionismo" (1920)
- "Estampa de Navidad" (1923)
- Pasaje de la poesía (1936)
- "Sagitario en la torre" (1936)
- "Arte menor" (1936)
- "El poeta desaparecido" (1940)
- Oaristes (1940)
- Constancias (1941)
