= HMS Falcon (1931) =

Gunboat of the Royal Navy

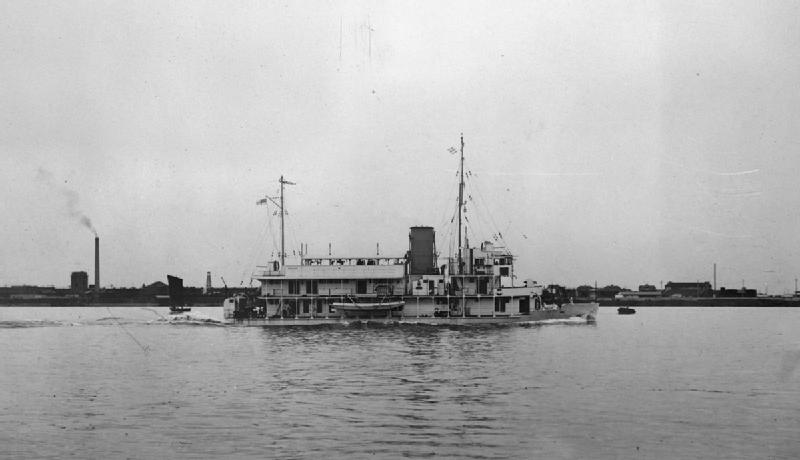
- Falcon underway on the Yangtse River.

History

United Kingdom
- Name: Falcon
- Builder: Yarrow Shipbuilders
- Launched: 8 May 1931
- Commissioned: 1931
- Decommissioned: March 1942
- Fate: Given to the Nationalist Chinese Navy in March 1942

Nationalist China
- Name: Yīng dé (英德)
- Acquired: March 1942
- Commissioned: March 1942
- Decommissioned: 30 November 1949
- Captured: 30 November 1949
- Fate: Defected to Communist China

Communist China
- Name: Nan Chiang
- Acquired: 30 November 1949
- Commissioned: 30 November 1949
- Decommissioned: 1974
- Fate: Retired in 1974

General characteristics
- Displacement: 372 tons
- Length: 150 ft (46 m)
- Beam: 28.7 ft (8.7 m)
- Draught: 5 ft (1.5 m)
- Propulsion: Four Parsons Marine Steam Turbine Company geared steam turbines; Two Admiralty 3-drum boilers; 2,250 shp (1,680 kW)
- Speed: 15 knots (28 km/h; 17 mph)
- Complement: 55
- Armament: 1 × 3.7-inch howitzer; 1 × QF 6 pounder Nordenfelt; 10 × machine guns

HMS Falcon was a river gunboat of the Royal Navy built by Yarrow Shipbuilders in 1931 for the Yangtze Patrol. The main armament of the gunboat was a 3.7-inch howitzer, and the secondary armament was a QF 6 pounder Nordenfelt. For air defense, the gunboat is armed with ten machine guns that could also be used against surface targets.

During World War II, HMS Falcon had to withdraw to the Chinese war time capital Chongqing, along with the retreating Chinese force to avoid being captured by the advancing Japanese invaders. In March 1941, the gunboat was paid off and her crew travelled overland to Yangon via the Burma Road and her guns were sent by elephants. The British decided to give the boat to Chinese as a gift, and Chinese in turn, began to train its own crew in preparation of the handover. Falcon was officially handed over to Chinese in February 1942, and in the following month, Falcon officially joined the Republic of China Navy (ROCN) and renamed as Yīng dé (Chinese: 英德). The gunboat served with ROCN until 30 November 1949, when the ROCN Riverine Flotilla commander defected to advancing communist force that blocked the Yangtze River, taking seven boats to the communist side, including Yīng dé. After joining the People's Liberation Army Navy (PLAN), the gunboat was once again renamed, this time changed to Nan Chiang, and served until 1974 to its final retirement.

== Publications ==
- Colledge, J. J.; Warlow, Ben (2006) [1969]. Ships of the Royal Navy: The Complete Record of All Fighting Ships of the Royal Navy from the 15th Century to the Present (3rd Rev ed.). London: Chatham Publishing. ISBN 978-1-86176-281-8. OCLC 67375475.
