= SS Indus (1945) =

History
- Name: Sasbeck (1945-46); Empire Ardle (1946-47); Lewis Hamilton (1947-50); Indus (1950-68); Falcon (1968); Sea Falcon (1968-71)
- Owner: Ministry of Transport (1946-47); Rodney Steamship Co Ltd, London (1947-50); C H Abramsen, Stockholm (1950-68); C Hultstrom, Stockholm (1968); Seabird Navigation Incorporated, Liberia (1968-69); Lilly Navigation Corporation, Panama (1969-70); Seabird Navigation Incorporated, Liberia (1970-71)
- Port of registry: (United Kingdom) London (1946-50); (Sweden) Stockholm (1950-68); Liberia (1968-69); Panama (1969-70); Liberia (1970-71)
- Builder: Flensburger Schiffbau-Gesellschaft, Flensburg
- Yard number: 506
- Launched: 27 March 1945
- Completed: November 1946
- Out of service: 1971
- Identification: UK Official Number 181527 (1946-50); Swedish Official Number 9218 (1950-68)
- Fate: Scrapped 1971

General characteristics
- Tonnage: 2,834 GRT
- Propulsion: 1 x compound steam engine
- Speed: 11 knots (20 km/h)

Indus was a 2,834 ton cargo ship which was built in Germany in 1945 and launched as Sasbeck. She was seized uncompleted at Lübeck in 1946 and renamed Empire Ardle. In 1947 she was renamed Lewis Hamilton and then in 1950 she was renamed Indus. In 1968 she was renamed Falcon and then Sea Falcon, serving until 1971 when she was scrapped.

== History ==
Indus was built by Flensburger Schiffbau-Gesellschaft, Flensburg, Germany and launched as Sasbeck on 27 March 1945. In May 1945, Sasbeck was one of 502 ships seized by the Allies after Germany was overrun at the end of the Second World War. Sasbeck was one of the eleven uncompleted ships that was allocated to the United Kingdom. She was found at Lübeck in an uncompleted state and passed to the Ministry of Transport. She was renamed Empire Ardle and completed in November 1946. In 1947, she was sold to the Rodney Steamship Co, London and renamed Lewis Hamilton, serving until 1950 when she was sold to C H Abrahamsen, Stockholm and renamed Indus. After eighteen years service with Abrahamsen's, Indus was sold in 1968 to the Seabird Navigation Corporation, Liberia, being resold to the Lilly Navigation Corporation, Panama in 1969 and renamed Sea Falcon. In 1970, Sea Falcon was sold back to Seabird, and served with them until 1971 when she was scrapped in Avilés, Spain. She arrived for scrapping on 15 July 1971.

== Official Number and code letters ==
Official Numbers were a forerunner to IMO Numbers.

Empire Ardle and Lewis Hamilton had the UK Official Number 181527. Indus had the Swedish Official Number 9218.
