= Falcon (surname) =

- Language: Spanish, Italian

Origin
- Meaning: one who raises falcons (possible)

Other names
- Variant form: Falcó

Falcon is a surname. Some possible places of origin are:

- Pompeyo Falcó, a Roman consul
- a Scandinavian prince, who arrived in Spain about 1080
- a prince of Sulcia, called Falcón, who ruled the island of Candia, near Venice, Italy and who married a daughter of King Camirto of Dacia

A possible beginning of the patronymic derivation of Falcon is Saint Falcón, who died in 1147, and is attributed with the popularization of the given name. Another is the Italian surname Falcó and Falcóne, which could easily have become Falcón in Spain.

In the coastal area of Languedoc, Girona and Ibiza there are areas known as Falcó, which may account for the surname in Catalonia, Balears and Valencia. By 1500, several Languedoc families using the name Faucon came from a Falconi family from Florence, Italy. Among the oldest of Valencia's historical Falcons is Micer Rodrigo Falcon recorded in 1441 as the Chancellery of Aragon. He obtained ownership of the plaza of vice-chancellor in 1460. His nephew was the famous doctor of law, Micer Damian Andres Falcon, noted to be "of much eloquent in speech".

In British records, the name was brought into England during the Norman Invasion of 1066. The name Faukonarii is mentioned who worked at Carnarvon Castle in 1282, earning 6d per day in the summer, and 5d in the winter. In 1273, Richard le Faulconer was recorded in Huntingdonshire and William Falconer was documented during the reign of Edward III. In the Yorkshire Poll Tax of 1379, a Geoffrey Faulconer was listed. In some cases this name may have also been an occupational name for a man who worked the 16th-century piece of artillery named after the bird of prey.

== List of persons with the surname ==
- Angelo Falcón (1951–2018), Puerto Rican political scientist
- Anna Marie Falcon (born 1982), Filipino actress, fashion model, and radio DJ known professionally as Francine Prieto
- Blas María de la Garza Falcón (1712–1767), Spanish settler in Tamaulipas and Texas
- Cornélie Falcon (1812–1897), French operatic soprano
- Ejay Falcon (born 1989), Filipino actor and politician
- Ismael Falcón (born 1984), Spanish footballer
- Joe Falcon (1900–1965), Cajun-American musician
- Joe Falcon (athlete) (born 1966), American runner
- Jonah Falcon (born 1970), American actor and television presenter
- Juan Crisóstomo Falcón, (1820–1870), Venezuelan politician, 11th President of Venezuela
- Kevin Falcon (born 1963), Canadian financier and politician
- Lidia Falcón (born 1935), Spanish politician and writer
- Miguel Falcón (born 1979), Spanish footballer and manager
- Nick Falcon (born 1968), American singer-songwriter and musician
- Norman Leslie Falcon (1904–1996), British petroleum geologist
- Rodolfo Falcón (born 1972), Cuban swimmer
