= Falcon Express Cargo Airlines =

IATA	ICAO	Call sign
FC	FCX	Falcon Cargo
- Founded: 1995
- Ceased operations: 2012
- Fleet size: 7
- Destinations: 6
- Parent company: Falcon Aviation Group
- Headquarters: Dubai, United Arab Emirates
- Website: http://www.falcongroup.bz/#/1_home/

Falcon Express Cargo Airlines was a cargo airline based in Dubai, United Arab Emirates. It was established in 1995 and operates express parcel services throughout the Persian Gulf, mainly for FedEx, UPS, TNT and Aramex. It also operated scheduled chartered cargo operations for DHL between Bahrain and Jeddah. Its main base was Dubai International Airport.

== Destinations ==
Falcon Express Cargo Airlines operated freight services to the following international scheduled destinations (February 2010): Dubai, Bahrain, Doha, Jeddah, Riyadh, Kuwait, Salalah. Falcon Express Cargo Airlines ceased operations in September 2012.

== Fleet ==
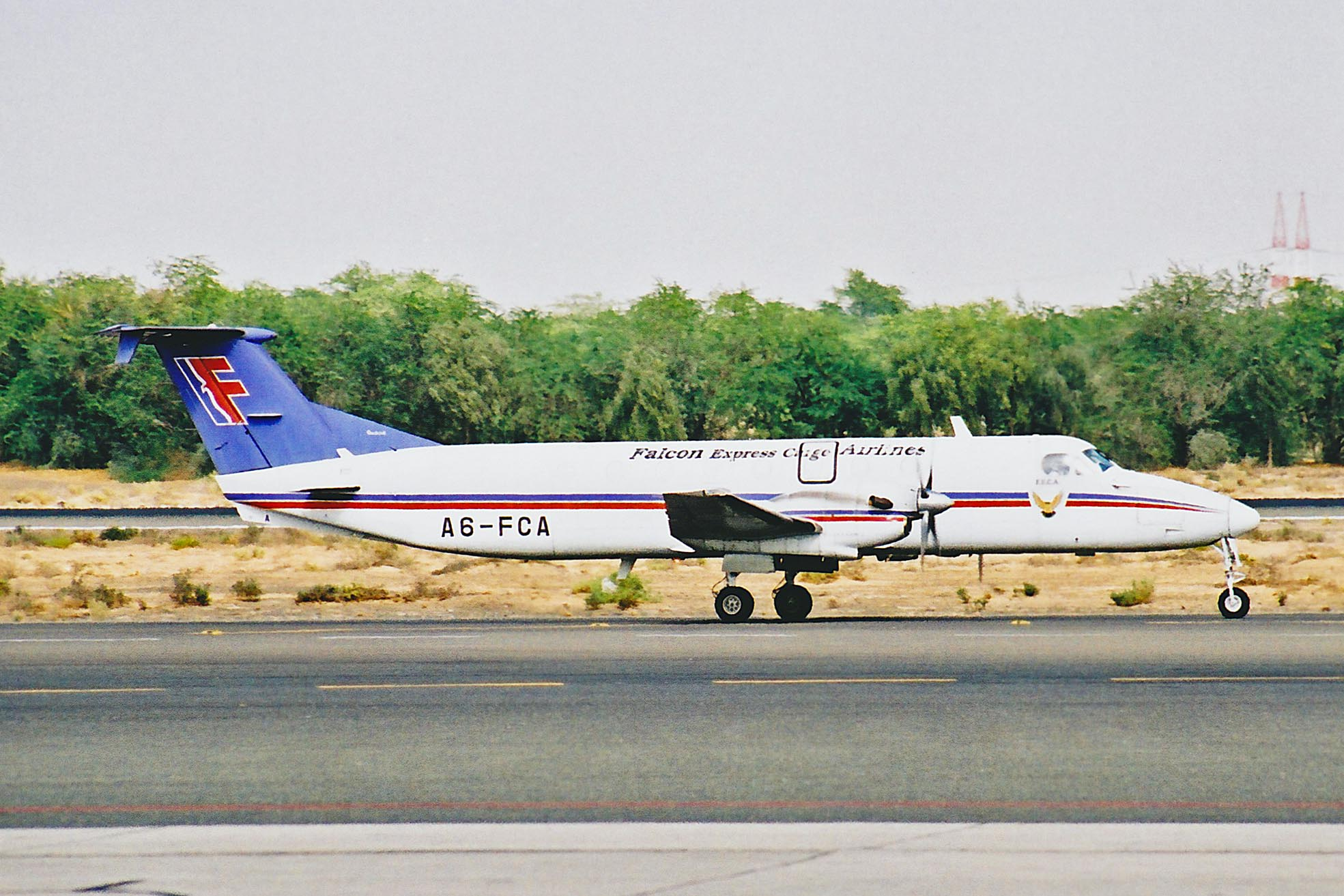
A Beechcraft 1900 of Falcon Express Cargo Airlines at Sharjah International Airport (November 2000)

The Falcon Express Cargo Airlines fleet includes the following aircraft (February 2010):

- 2 Fokker F27 Mk500,
- 5 Raytheon Beech 1900C Airliners
